= List of political families in Sri Lanka =

This is a partial listing of prominent political families in Sri Lanka.

== Abdul Majeed ==
- A. L. Abdul Majeed (15 November 1933 – 13 November 1987) also known as Mutur Majeed, former Deputy Minister of Information and Broadcasting and Member Parliament from 1960–1977.
  - M. N. Abdul Majeed (1 January 1957 – ) Chief Minister of the Eastern Province, former Government Minister and Member of Parliament

== Abeyratne ==
- Herath Banda Abeyratne – Member of Parliament for Yapahuwa (1977–1989), former Deputy Minister of Transport, former District Minister and former Provincial Council Member and Licensed Surveyor
- Abeyratne Pilapitiya (25 May 1925 – 2025) 3rd Governor of Uva Province, 2nd Chief Minister of Sabaragamuwa Province, Member of Parliament for Kalawana 1960, 1965, 1977–82, Deputy Minister of Posts and Telecommunications.
- Abeyratne Ratnayaka – First Cabinet Minister of Food, Co-operatives and Home Affairs in independent Ceylon (now Sri Lanka) and the last President of the Senate of Ceylon, former Member of Parliament and State Council.
- Pathirage Don Abeyratne (26 November 1952 – ) Member of 5th Provincial Council of Kalutara, Member of Parliament for Kalutara 1989 and 2000, Chief Organiser for Horana.
- Lloyd Oscar Abeyratne – appointed member of Parliament (1960–64)
- Rohana Abeyratne – Postmaster General of Sri Lanka (2012–2018)

== Abeywickrama ==
- Don Pedris Ferdinandus Abeywickrama
  - Padikara Muhandiram Don Pedris Francis Abeywickrama (28 May 1886 – 20 February 1966) writer, poet, critic and pioneer freedom fighter
    - Keerthisena Abeywickrama (20 December 1933 – 18 August 1987) District Minister for Matara and Member of Parliament for Deniyaya in 1977 (UNP). Killed in the 1987 grenade attack in the Sri Lankan Parliament.
    - Keerthilatha Abeywickrama Member of Parliament for Deniyaya in 1987 (UNP).
  - Don Hendrick Abeywickrama Vidane Arachchi in Morawaka
    - Sumanadasa Abeywickrama (5 February 1928 – 27 February 2006) Deputy Minister of Agriculture Development & Research and Member of Parliament for Akmeemana in 1977 (UNP).

== Abeywickrema ==
- Simon Abeywickrema (26 April 1899 – 2 May 1948) Parliamentary Secretary to the Minister of Transport. Member of State Council and Parliament, founding member of the United National Party (UNP)
- Henry Abeywickrema (24 December 1903 – 29 August 1982) Parliamentary Secretary to the Minister of Transport and Works, Minister of Works, Member of Parliament, founding member of the Sri Lanka Freedom Party (SLFP)
  - Ananda Abeywickrema (24 June 1960 – ) former member of Parliament for Galle District

== Aluthgamage ==
- S.M Aluthgamage - Nawalapitiya Electorate - Member of Parliament 1970-1977
- Mahindananda Aluthgamage - Member of parliament - 2000–present
- Ananda Aluthgamage - Member of Parliament - 2015-2019

== Aluwihare ==
- Sir Richard Aluwihare, Inspector General of Police and Ceylon's High Commissioner to India
- Bernard Aluwihare (6 April 1902 – 22 January 1961) State Counsellor (1936–47), Member of Parliament (1952, 1960–61), Cabinet Minister
  - Alick Aluwihare, (20 December 1926 – 17 May 2009) Cabinet Minister, Member of Parliament
    - Wasantha Aluwihare (16 July 1962 – ) Member of Parliament, former chief minister of Central Province, Deputy Minister.
    - Ranjith Aluwihare (5 May 1958 – ) Member of Parliament for Matale District, former Opposition Leader, Matale Municipal Council
    - Prasanna Kumara Aluwihare, Member of Pradeshiya saba Matale, former National javelin record holder / National Kabadi player / First class cricketer, Government Sports officer
- Loku Banda Aluvihare Mayor of Kandy (2006-2010)

== Amarasuriya ==
Ref:

- Mahendrapala Thomas de Silva Amarasuriya, Muhandiram
  - Henry Mahendrapala Amarasuriya Independence activist
    - Henry Woodward Amarasuriya, Cabinet Minister, Deputy Speaker of the Parliament and State Councillor, founding Secretary and Vice President of the United National Party, President of Ceylon National Congress and Lanka Mahajana Sabha, educationist, Buddhist activist and philanthropist
    - Thomas Amarasuriya, OBE, Member of the State Council of Ceylon and President of the Senate of Ceylon.
      - G. L. Peiris,(1946– ) Member of Parliament, Minister of External Affairs, Minister of Justice and Constitutional Affairs and Deputy Minister of Finance, Minister of External Trade, Ethnic Affairs and National Integration. [Son in law of Thomas Amarasuriya]
    - Montague Jayawickrama,(1911–2001) Member of Parliament, Minister of Public Administration and Home Affairs and Governor of the North Western Province married Amara Amarasuriya [Brother in law of H.W. and Thomas Amarasuriya].

== Amunugama ==
- Sarath Amunugama, Government Minister, Member of Parliament
  - Dilum Amunugama, (nephew of Sarath Amunugama) Member of Parliament

== Ashraff ==
- M. H. M. Ashraff, Government Minister, Member of Parliament
- Ferial Ashraff, Government Minister, Member of Parliament and diplomat

== Atapattu ==
Ref:

- Don Johannes Atapattu + Kadawedduwage Dona Carolina Wijekoon
  - D. P. Atapattu (1899–1976), Government Minister, Member of Parliament + Daya Dahanayake
    - Ranjit Atapattu Government Minister, Member of Parliament.
      - Druvindra Atapattu contestant in 2009 General Election

(also related to Dr Karunasena Kodituwakku)

== Atukorale ==
- Gamini Atukorale,(1951–2002) Government Minister, Member of Parliament
- Thalatha Atukorale, Government Minister, Member of Parliament

== Athulathmudali ==
Ref:

- Don William Athulathmudali
  - Don Daniel Athulathmudali (1901–1958), Member of State Council
    - Lalith Athulathmudali (1936–1993), Government Minister, Member of Parliament + Srimani Athulathmudali (1946-2004), Government Minister, Member of Parliament

== Attanayake ==
- Attanayake Mudiyanselage Jayawardena Attanayake (Member of Parliament, Moneragala District 1970 and 1994) and Basnayake Nilame of the Ruhunu Kataragama Maha Devalaya
  - Senarath Attanayake Former Provincial Minister of Uva Province and current Member of Uva Provincial Council

== Attygalle ==
Ref:

- Don Charles Gemoris Attygalle, Mudaliyar
  - Alice Elizabeth Attygalle + John Kotelawala
    - Sir John Kotelawala (4 April 1895 – 2 October 1980) Prime Minister of Ceylon, Cabinet Minister, member of Parliament (1947–60), Member of State Council (1931–47), Member of Legislative Council
    - Justin Kotelawala (1905–1973), Senator + Millicent de Silva
      - Lalith Kotelawala
  - Lena Attygalle + Colonel Theodore Godfrey Wijesinghe Jayewardene (1872–1945), Member of State Council
  - Ellen Attygalle + Fredrick Richard Senanayake (1882–1926), Member of Legislative Council
    - Richard Gotabhaya Senanayake (4 November 1911 – 22 December 1970), Member of State Council, Cabinet Minister, Member of Parliament (1947–70)

- Sir Nicholas Attygalle - President of the Senate of Ceylon
- C. E. Attygalle - Parliamentary secretary to the Minister of Health and member of parliament

== Balasuriya ==
- Punchi Banda Balasuriya (1907–1978), UC Chairman (1948–1967), Member of Parliament (1960–1965, 1970–1977) + Hema Balasuriya
  - Dr. Jagath Balasuriya, Provincial Council Member (1988–1989), Member of Parliament (1989–1994), Deputy Minister of Cooperative (1994–2000), Deputy Minister of Urban Development (2001–2002), Governor North Central (2004–2008), Deputy Minister of Labor (2010–2011), Cabinet Minister for National Heritage (2011–2015) + Kumari Balasuriya, Governor Southern Province (2008–2015)
    - Tharaka Balasuriya, Member of Parliament, Provincial council member + Malintha Bolonghe Balasuriya

== Bandara ==
- Chandra Bandara Government Minister, Member of Parliament
  - Chandani Bandara, Government Minister, Member of Parliament

== Bandaranaike ==
Ref:

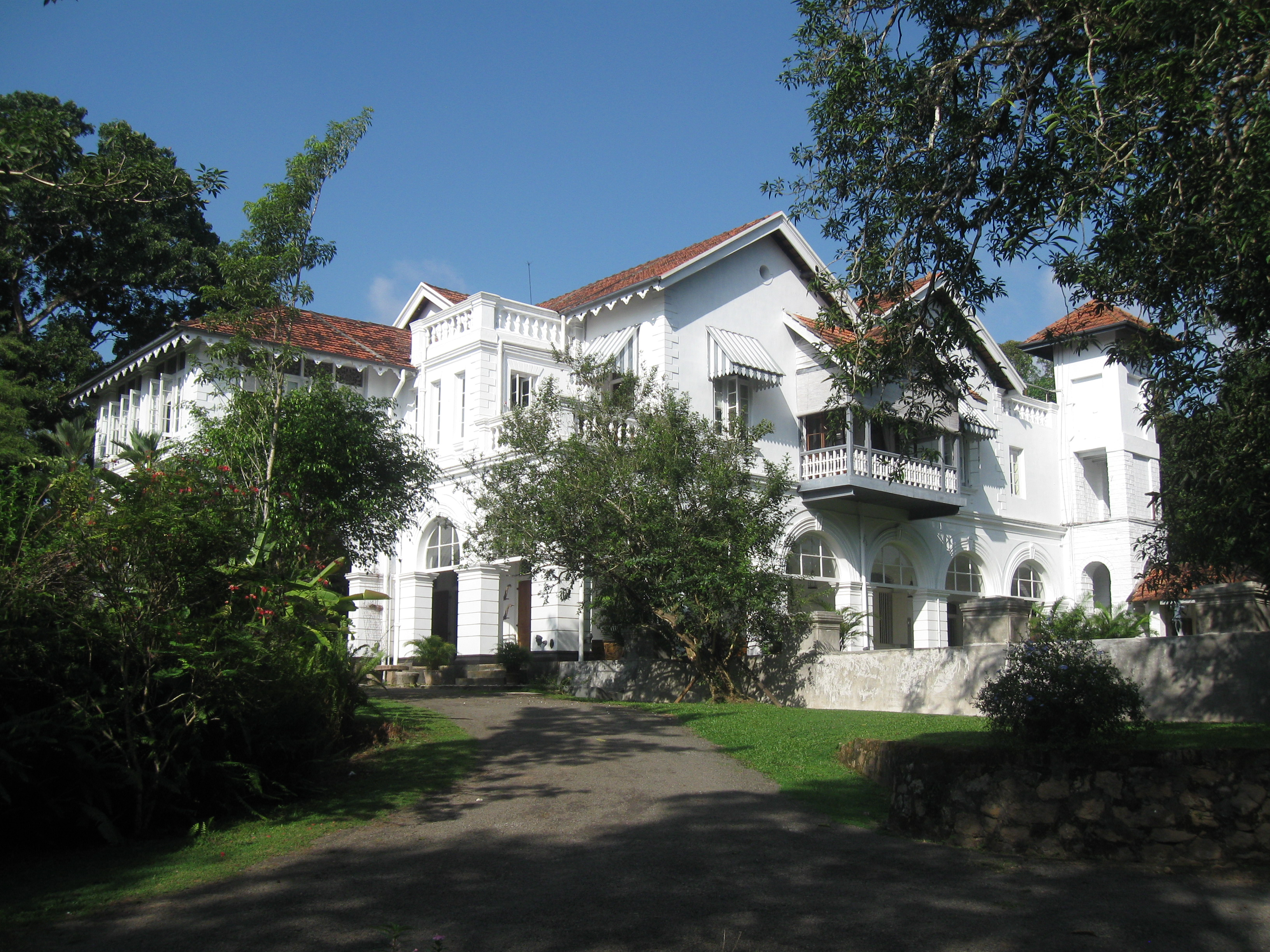
Horagolla Walauwa, Atthanagalla. family seat of the Bandaranaike family

- Don Francisco Dias Wijetunga Bandaranaike (1720 – ), Mudaliyar Hewagam Korale + Dona Maria Perera
  - Conrad Pieter Dias Wijewardena Bandaranaike, Maha Mudliyar
    - Jacabus Dias Wijewardena Bandaranaike (1780 – ), Mudaliyar of Governor Gate, Translator of Supreme Court + Liyanage Catherine Philipsz Panditharatne
      - Rev Canon Samuel William Dias Bandaranaike + Cornelia Susanna Elizabeth Dias Bandaranaike
        - Felix Reginold Dias Bandaranaike (1861–1947) + Annie Lucy (Florence) de Alwis (1864–1920)
          - Reginald Felix Dias Bandaranaike (1891–1951), Judge of the Supreme Court + Freda Dias Abeysinghe
            - Felix Dias Bandaranaike (1930–1985), Government Minister, Member of Parliament
  - Don Daniel Dias Banaranaike + Dona Clara Amarasekere
    - Don Solomon Dias Bandaranaike (−1859), Mudaliyar of Siyane Korale, 1st Udagaha Mudaliyar + Cornelia Philipsz Panditharatne de Saram
      - Don Christoffel Henricus Dias Abeywickrema Jayatilake Seneviratne Bandaranaike (1826– ), Mudaliyar Governors Gate and 2nd Udagaha Mudaliyar + Anna Florentina Philipsz Panditharatne
        - Sir Solomon Dias Bandaranaike JP (1862–1946), Maha Mudaliyar + Daisy Ezline Obeyesekere
          - S. W. R. D. Bandaranaike (1899–1959), Prime Minister of Ceylon, Government Minister, Member of Parliament, Member of State Council. + Sirimavo Bandaranaike (1916–2000), Prime Minister of Ceylon, Member of Parliament, Senator
            - Sunethra Bandaranaike (c. 1943– ), philanthropist and socialite
            - Chandrika Kumaratunga (1945– ), President of Sri Lanka, Prime Minister of Sri Lanka, Member of Parliament, Chief Minister of Western Province, Provincial Councillor + Vijaya Kumaratunga (1945–1988), actor and politician
            - Anura Bandaranaike (1949–2008); Speaker of the Parliament of Sri Lanka, Government Minister, Member of Parliament

(also related to Ratwatte family, Ellawala family, William Gopallawa, S. D. Bandaranayake, A.R. Udugama, Panini Ilangakoon, Hector Kobbekaduwa, Jeewan Kumaranatunga, Ranjan Ramanayake)

== Bakeer Markar ==
- Mohammed Abdul Bakeer Markar (12 May 1917 – 10 September 1997) 10th Speaker of the Parliament of Sri Lanka, Minister without Portfolio, Member of Parliament, Governor of Southern Province
  - Imthiaz Bakeer Markar, (8 August 1953 ) Government Minister, Member of Parliament

== Bulankulame ==
- Punchi Banda Bulankulame Dissawe,(12 December 1890 – 17 December 1958) Member of the State Council (1936), Member, House of Representatives, Parliamentary Secretary (Agriculture and Lands), Minister of Lands and Land Development

(Maternal Uncle of Edwin Loku Bandara Hurulle and Granduncle of Themiya Loku Bandara Hurulle)

  - Deshamanya Edwin Loku Bandara Hurulle, (19 January 1919 – 6 April 2009), Member, House of Representatives, Member of Parliament, Government Minister, Governor, Central Province, High Commissioner in Australia, Governor, North Central Province (Nephew of P.B. Bulankulame Dissawe)
    - Themiya Loku Bandara Hurulle, (16 March 1952– ), Member of Parliament, Project Minister (Science and Technology), Member, North Central Provincial Council, Director-General of Telecommunications, Telecommunications Regulatory Commission of Sri Lanka (T.R.C.S.L.), Engineer (A.C.&R.) (Son of Edwin Loku Bandara Hurulle)

== Cooray ==
- Mervyn J. Cooray (16 July 1938 – 15 January 2011) former State Minister of Power and Energy, member of Parliament
  - Devapriya Cooray
  - Sujith Cooray former Provincial Councilor of the Western Provincial Council, member of parliament

== Coomaraswamy ==
Ref:

- Arumugampillai Coomaraswamy (1783–1836), Gate Mudaliyar, Member of Legislative Council
  - Sir Muthu Coomaraswamy CCS FRGS (1833–1879), Member of Legislative Council + Elizabeth Clay Beeby
    - Ananda Coomaraswamy (1877–1947)
  - Sellachchi Coomaraswamy + A. Ponnambalam (1814–1887), Mudaliyar of the Governor's Gate
    - P. Coomaraswamy (1849–1906), Member of Legislative Council
    - Sir Ponnambalam Ramanathan KCMG QC (1851–1930), Solicitor General of British Ceylon, Member of Legislative Council + Leelawathy Ramanathan (1870–1953)
      - Sivagamasundari + S. Natesan, Member of Parliament, Member of State Council, Senator
    - Sir Ponnambalam Arunachalam KCMG CCS (1853–1924), Member of Executive Council, Member of Legislative Council + Swarnambal Namasivayam
      - Sir Arunachalam Mahadeva KCMG (1888–1969), Government Minister, Member of Legislative Council, Member of State Council, High Commissioner to India
        - Balakumar (Baku) Mahadeva, (1921–2013)
      - Pathmavathy Arunachalam + Sir S. Pararajasingam, Senator
        - D. M. Swaminathan (1945– ), Member of Parliament, Governor of Western Province, grandson of above (also related to D. M. Swaminathan and Ulaganathar Mudaliyar of Manipay)

== Corea ==
- Victor Corea – founder Member of the Ceylon National Congress, elected to the Legislative Council, founder Chilaw Association, President Ceylon Labour Union
  - Dr. C.V.S. Corea – Medical Doctor
    - Dr. Gamani Corea – (1974 to 1984) Under-Secretary-General of the United Nations, Ceylon's Ambassador to the EEC, Belgium, Luxembourg and the Netherlands, the Permanent Secretary of the Ministry of Planning and Economic Affairs of Ceylon and the Senior Deputy Governor of the Central Bank of Ceylon
- Charles Edgar Corea – elected to the Legislative Council, President of the Ceylon National Congress (1924), Chair/founder Chilaw Association.
  - Shirley Corea, (1906–1974) Speaker of the Parliament of Ceylon, Member of Parliament for Chilaw, Minister of Commerce, Trade and Fisheries.

(Also related to)

- Sir Claude Corea – Minister of Labour 1946, High Commissioner of Sri Lanka in the UK, Ceylon's Ambassador in the US, President of the United Nations Security Council, Ceylon's Ambassador at the United Nations
  - Harindra Corea, Deputy Foreign Minister of Sri Lanka, Member of Parliament for Chilaw

(Also related to) Dr. Gamani Corea, Ambassador, Secretary-General of UNCTAD, Assistant Secretary-General of the United Nations Ernest Corea, Sri Lanka's High Commissioner to Canada, Sri Lanka's Ambassador to the United States of America Kumari Corea, Provincial Councillor, NWP.

== Dahanayake ==
- Sumanapala Dahanayake, Member of Parliament
  - Wijaya Dahanayake, Deputy Minister and Member of Parliament

== Dissanayake ==
- Andrew Dissanayake, (1910–?) Parliamentary Secretary, Member of Parliament
  - Gamini Dissanayake (1942–1994), Presidential candidate (1994), Leader of the Opposition, Government Minister, Member of Parliament + Srima Dissanayake, Presidential candidate (1994)
    - Navin Dissanayake (1969 – ), Government Minister, Member of Parliament
    - Mayantha Dissanayake, Provincial Councillor, Member of Parliament

Karu Jayasuriya, Speaker of the Parliament, Government Minister, Member of Parliament – Father in law of Navin Dissanayake

== Dissanayake ==
- Berty Premalal Dissanayake, Government Minister, Member of Parliament, Chief Minister of North Central Province + Jayani Tissera Dissanayake
  - Duminda Dissanayake (1979 – ), Government Minister, Member of Parliament + Senani Lanka Jayaratne

== De Mel ==
- Sir Henry De Mel, Member of the Legislative Council
  - R. S. F. de Mel, Senator, Mayor of Colombo

(cousins)

  - R. A. de Mel, Deputy Speaker of the Parliament
  - Ronnie de Mel (1925–2024) Government Minister, Member of Parliament + Mallika de Mel, Member of Parliament

(Also related to Sir Leo Fernando, Member of Parliament (father in law of Ronnie de Mel))

== De Silva ==
- C. P. de Silva, Government Minister, Member of Parliament
- Merril de Silva, Member of Parliament
- A. H. de Silva, Member of Parliament

(cousins)

- Dr Colvin R. de Silva, Government Minister, Member of Parliament
  - Manouri Muttetuwegama, Commissioner of the Human Rights Commission of Sri Lanka + Sarath Muttetuwegama, Member of Parliament (son in law of Colvin R. de Silva)

== Dunuwille ==
- B. H. Dunuwille (1896 – ), Deputy President of the Senate, Proctor, Notary Public
- Harindra Dunuwille (1946 – ) member of Parliament, State Minister of State and Constitutional Affairs, member of Kandy Municipal Council, Mayor of Kandy and Attorney- at Law
- D. S. Senanayake (1883–1952) 1st Prime Minister of Sri Lanka was married to Molly Dunuwille
- Dudley Senanayake (1911–1973) 2nd Prime Minister of Sri Lanka, son of Molly Dunuwille and D. S. Senanayake

== Ekanayake ==
- T. B. Ekanayake (1954 – ), Member of Parliament -Kurunegala (1994–2000, 2001–present)"T.B. EKANAYAKE". Directory of Members. Parliament of Sri Lanka. Archived from the original on 13 October 2010., Deputy Minister Education (2010–2015)
- Sarath Ekanayake – 7th and current Chief Minister of the Central Province of Sri Lanka
- Nandimithra Ekanayake – Member of Parliament (1989–2015); Chief Minister of Central Province (1999–2000); Minister of Environmental and Forest Resources (1996–1999)
- Niluka Ekanayake – Governor of Central Province (2016–present)
- E. M. R. B. Ekanayake (?-1962), Member of Parliament – Mawatagama (1960)
- S. B. Ekanayake (1906–1977), Member of Parliament – Soranatota (1960–1965)
- Herath Ekanayake (1927–1971), Member of Parliament – Mawatagama (1965–1970)

== Ellawala ==
- William Ellawala, Member, Ceylon Legislative Council
  - William Ellawala Jnr
    - Richard Stephen Ellawala, Basnayake Nilame, Saparagamuwa Maha Saman Devalaya
  - Francis Theodore Ellawala + Eslin Mahawalatenne
    - Harriet Ellawala + Cyril Dangamuwa
    - William Theodore Ellawala, RM Nawadun Korale, Ratnapura + Millicent Dimbulana
      - Rohini Sita Ellawala + Seevali Ratwatte
        - Lakmini Ratwatte + Upali Wijewardene
        - Eranthika Ratwatte Kelegama + Saman Kelegama
    - Robert Sydney Ellawala + Mallika Kobbekaduwa
      - Nanda Ellawala, Member of Parliament for Ratnapura (1970–1977) + Surangani Tennekoon, Governor of the Central Province (2015—2016)
        - Nalanda Ellawala, Member of Parliament for Ratnapura district (1994–1997)
      - Mohan Ellawala, Governor of the Sabaragamuwa Province
        - Akila Ellawala, Provincial Council Member
      - Mallika Ratwatte, Member of Parliament + Clifford Ratwatte, Member of Parliament

(also related to Ratwatte family, Bandaranaike family)

== Gamage (Kekirawa) ==
- Gamage Don Mahindasoma, former Member of Parliament for Kekirawa, former chief minister of the North Central Province
  - Lal Dharmapriya Gamage. (nephew of G. D. Mahindasoma) former Member of Parliament for Anuradhapura district, former Minister Assisting Foreign Affairs
  - Chandima Gamage, Member of Parliament for Anuradhapura district

== Gamage ==
- Daya Gamage, Member of Parliament, Government Minister
- Anoma Gamage, Member of Parliament, Government Minister

== Ganesan ==
- V. P. Ganeshan, trade unionist, politician, film producer and actor
  - Mano Ganesan (1959 – ), Member of Parliament, Provincial Councillor
  - Praba Ganesan (1964 – ), Member of Parliament, Provincial Councillor

== Gopallawa ==
Ref:

- William Gopallawa (1897–1981), Governor-General of Ceylon, President of Sri Lanka
  - Monty Gopallawa (1941–2005), Government Minister, Member of Parliament + Nimal Kobbekaduwa
  - Chandrika Iranganie Gopallawa + Dr Mackie Ratwatte
  - Chintha Gopallawa
    - Devika Mediwake + Neranjan Wijeyeratne (1956– )

(also related to Ratwatte)

== Gunasekara (Heiyantuduwa, Biyagama) ==
- Tudor Gunasekara – former Member of Parliament for Mahara, former District Minister for Gampaha, former Sri Lanka ambassador to Poland, Bulgaria, Romania, and Hungary
  - Anuradha Dullewe Wijeyeratne – former Councillor of Sabaragamuwa Provincial Council, Ex-Acting Diyawadana Nilame of Sri Dalada Maligawa, Kandy (son-in-law of Tudor Gunasekara)

== Gunasekera (Udugampola, Minuwangoda) ==
- Bennet Gunasekera – Member of Parliament for Minuwangoda from 1977 to 1988
  - Mahen Gunasekera – Minister for Legal Reforms and Prison Affairs – Member of Parliament for Gampaha District (1989–1994)

== Gunasekera (Ratnayake Mudiyanselage) ==
- R. M. Gunasekera - Member of Parliament for Bibile
  - Ranjith Madduma Bandara - Minister and Member of Parliament
- Dharmadasa Banda - Member of Parliament for Bibile

== Gunawardena (Boralugoda Ralahamy) ==
Ref:

- Don Jacolis Rupasinghe Gunawardena (1879–1947) + Leonora
  - Philip Gunawardena (1901–1972), Government Minister, Member of Parliament, Member of State Council The 'Father of Socialism in Sri Lanka', first person to call for Independence in Sri Lanka + Kusumasiri Amarasinghe (1912–1985) Member of Parliament
    - Indika Gunawardena, Government Minister, Member of Parliament
    - Prasanna Gunawardena, Mayor of Colombo, Presidential adviser
    - Dinesh Gunawardena (1949 – ), Prime Minister of Sri Lanka, Cabinet Minister and Member of Parliament
      - Yadamini Gunawardena, Member of Parliament + Samanmali Sakalasooriya, Provincial Councillor
    - Gitanjana Gunawardena (1952 – ), Government Minister, Member of Parliament
  - Robert Gunawardena (1904–1971), Member of Parliament, Ambassador to Beijing, 1965–1970
  - Caroline Gunawardena + S. C. C. Anthonypillai (Tony), Trade Unionist, Member of the Lok Sabha
  - Emily Angeline Gunawardena + Dr Don Allenson Goonetilleke
    - Vivienne Goonewardena (1916–1996), Member of Parliament, Minister of Health + Leslie Goonewardena, Member of Parliament and Minister of Transport, founding father of the LSSP

== Gunewardane ==
- Lionel Gunewardena, Deputy Minister
  - Sarana Gunewardane, Deputy Minister, Member of Parliament, Provincial Councillor
  - Chandrika Gunewardane, Provincial Councillor + Sardhatissa Sakalasuriya, Member of Parliament, Provincial Council Chairman
  - Lakshman Gunewardane, Urban Councillor

== Hewavitarne-Moonesinghe ==
Ref:

- Andiris Perera Dharmagunawardhana (1809–1890), President of the Buddhist Theosophical Society, founder President of the Buddhism Protection Committee, founder of the Vidyodaya Pirivena and a leader of the Buddhist revival in Sri Lanka
  - Mallika Dharmagunawardhana (1846–1936), President Women's Education Society + Don Carolis Hewavitarne (1833–1906) founder member of Buddhist Theosophical Society, founder member of the Buddhist Defence Committee and a leader of the Buddhist revival in Sri Lanka
    - Anagarika Dharmapala (Don David Hewavitarne) (1864–1933), Leader of the Buddhist revival movement
    - Dona Engeltina Hewavitarne (1865–1902) + Jacob Moonesinghe, a leader of the Buddhist revival movement
      - Sanath Moonesinghe
        - Mangala Moonesinghe, Member of Parliament, High Commissioner to India and UK
      - Piyadas Moonesinghe (1896–1969) + Beatrice Wijegoonewardena de Silva Senanayaka (1900–1989)
        - Anil Moonesinghe (1927–2002), Deputy Speaker, Minister of Communications, Member of Parliament, trade unionist, Ambassador in Vienna
        - Susil Moonesinghe (1930–2012), first Chief Minister of the Western Province, Member of Parliament, Ambassador in Tehran
    - Edmund Hewavitarne (1870–1915), convicted of treason, died in British custody + Sujatha Peiris
      - Raja Hewavitarne, OBE (1898–1958), Member of State Council Matara, Minister of Labour, Industry and Commerce
      - Neil Kamal Hewavitarne (1904–1939), Member of State Council Udugama
      - Sumanadevi Hewavitarne + Jayasuriya
        - Gamini Jayasuriya (1924–1998)Cabinet Minister and Member of Parliament Homagama
    - Dr Charles Alwis Hewavitarne (1876–1929), leader in the Buddhist revival movement

== Hurulle ==
- Edwin Loku Bandara Hurulle, (1919–2009), Member, House of Representatives, Member of Parliament, Government Minister, Governor (Central Province), High Commissioner in Australia, Governor (North Central Province).
- Themiya Loku Bandara Hurulle (1952 – ), Member of Parliament, Project Minister (Science and Technology), Member,(North Central Provincial Council)
- Punchi Banda Bulankulame Dissawe, Member of the State Council (1936), Member, House of Representatives, Parliamentary Secretary (Agriculture), Minister of Lands and Land Development, Proctor, Notary Public and Captain (Cricket ),1919–1920, St.Thomas’ College, Mt.Lavinia(Maternal Uncle of Edwin Loku Bandara Hurulle and Granduncle of Themiya Loku Bandara Hurulle)
- Harindra Dunuwille (1946 – ), Member of Parliament, State Minister of State and Constitutional Affairs, Member, Kandy Municipal Council, Mayor of Kandy, Attorney at Law (son-in-law of E. L. B. Hurulle)

== Ilangaratne ==
- T. B. Ilangaratne (1913–1992), Government Minister, Member of Parliament + Tamara Kumari Ilangaratne, Member of Parliament (Kandy)

== Jayewardene ==
Ref:

- Tombi Mudaliyar Don Adrian Wijesinghe Jayewardene (1768–1830) A descendant of a Colombo Chetty originally from Coromandel Coast of India who married into a Sinhalese family called Jayewardene; conspired with the British to overthrow the last King of Kandy
  - Mudaliyar Don Abraham Wijesinghe Jayewardene (1801–1866)
    - James Alfred Jayewardene (c. 1845 – 1888), Deputy Coroner of Colombo + Cornelia Matilda Wijekoon
      - Hector Alfred Jayewardene, (1870–1913), member of the Colombo Municipal Council
      - Colonel T. G. Jayewardene (1872–1945), Member of State Council + Lena Attygalle
        - Major T. F. Jayewardene, Member of Parliament
        - Margie Jayewardene + A. F. Wijemanne, Minister of Justice and Member of the Senate
      - Justice Eugene Wilfred Jayewardene, KC (1874–1932), Chief Justice + Agnes Helen Don Philip Wijewardene
        - J. R. Jayewardene (1906–1996), President of Sri Lanka, Prime Minister of Sri Lanka, Government Minister, Member of Parliament, Member of State Council
          - Captain Ravi Jayewardene (1936 - 2017), National Security Adviser
            - Pradeep Jayewardene, Member of Colombo Municiple Council
        - Hector Wilfred Jayewardene, QC (1916–1990), Member at the United Nations Commission on Human Rights
      - John Adrian St. Valentine Jayewardene (1877–1927), Judge of the Supreme Court of Ceylon
        - Clodagh Jayasuriya, Member of Parliament + Bernard Jayasuriya, Member of State Council

== Jayaratne ==
- S. D. R. Jayaratne, Government Deputy Minister (1931 - 2008) (Former Deputy Minister of Fisheries and Minister of Fisheries) and Member of Parliament for Chilaw(1960 to 2000)
  - Piyankara Jayaratne (1964- ), Foreign Employment Development Minister, Civil Aviation Minister (former Deputy Speaker/ former State Minister law and Order, former State Minister Local Government, former State Minister Indigenous Medicine), former Deputy Minister Youth Affairs and Member of Parliament

== Jayaratne (Doluwa, Gampola) ==
- D. M. Jayaratne, former prime minister of Sri Lanka
  - Anuradha Jayaratne, Deputy Minister, Member of Parliament, Provincial Councillor

Hon. Jayarathne's daughter had married to Duminda Dissanayake, government minister. After the broken of the marriage the daughter has married Mahindananda Aluthgamage, government minister.

== Jayatilaka ==
- Robert Edward Jayatilaka, Former Government Minister, Member of Parliament, Member of State Council. + Effie Jayatilaka, Former Chairman – Nawalapitiya Urban Council (sister of Edmund Samarakkody and first wife of Panini Ilangakoon)
  - (Grand daughter) Anarkali Akarsha, Former Provincial Councillor, Southern Province

== Kariapper ==
Ref:

- Marikkar Vedarala
  - Haji Marikkar Muhandiram – Dissawa of Wellassa, d:1817
    - Neina Marikkar
      - Ahamedu Lebbe Kariapper
        - Abdul Kareem Kariapper – Notary JP (Vanniah of Eravur Pattu and Koralai Pattu- circa 1912)
          - Hanoon Kariapper d:1952 + M. I. Abdul Rasool Mudali of Trincomalee
          - 2nd spouse of Hanoon Kariapper (the widow of M.I. Abdul Rasool) + M. A. M. Hussain, District Judge, d:2000
        - Dr. Mohamed Ibrahim Kariapper – LAILATHUL KATHIRIYA KARIAPPER
          - M. S. Kariapper (1899–1989), Gate Mudaliyar, Member of Parliament
            - Subeitha Zohara MS Kariapper + A. R. Mansoor, Member of Parliament, Former Government Minister and Former Sri Lankan ambassador to the State of Kuwait and the Kingdom of Bahrain
            - Shahida MS Kariapper + M. M. Musthafa, Government Minister, Member of Parliament
            - MADANIYA Dr. Mohamed Ibrahim Kariapper + Mohamed Cassim Kariapper
              - M.C. Ahamed, Member of Parliament Kalmunai 1960–1977), d: 3 July 2008
        - Zainabu Natchiar Kariapper + Mohamed Meera Lebbe
          - Mohammed Meera Lebbe Hussain + Matheena Ummah
            - M. H. M. Ashraff (1948–2000), founder and leader of the Sri Lanka Muslim Congress, Government Minister, Member of Parliament + Ferial Ismail Ashraff (1953 – ), Government Minister, Member of Parliament
        - Khatheeja Kos Mohamed Notaris bin Ibra Lebbe Kariapper + [200] Abdul Latheef Kariapper (had 13 children of which 1 died in infancy, 1 died in early youth)
          - Abdul Kareem Kariapper + MAriyam Nachi Selapullai Udayar(from Ninthavur)
            - Zohara (Nona) AK Kariapper + Advocate Samsudeen Member of Parliament, former Sri Lankan Ambassador to UAE
              - Ariff Samsudeen Attorney-at-Law (1972) – Member of Eastern Provincial Council

== Karunathilake ==
- Rupa Karunathilake, Government Minister, Member of ParliamentWijesekera, Richmond. "Rupa did yeoman service to district, electorate, and Motherland – PM". Daily News. Archived from the original on 23 April 2003.
  - Gayantha Karunathilaka, (nephew of Rupa Karunathilake) Government Minister, Member of Parliament
  - Sanjeev Karunathilaka, Provincial Councillor, Southern Province

== Keerthiratne-Karunaratne ==
- N. H. Keerthiratne, (1902–1992), Government Minister, Member of Parliament
- Asoka Karunaratne (1916–1988), Government Minister, Member of Parliament
  - Samantha Karunaratne, Government Minister, Member of Parliament

== Kotelawala ==
- Don Manuel Kotelawala from Undugoda, Bandaragama
  - Don A Kotelawala
    - John Kotelawala Sr, Inspector of Ceylon Police Force + Alice Elisabeth Kotelawala
      - Sir John Kotelawala, Third Prime Minister of Ceylon and Privy Councilor
      - Justin Kotelawala, Senator
        - Lalith Kotelawala
      - Freda Corea, Sister of Sir John and Justin Kotelawala
        - Dr. Gamani Corea – (1974 to 1984) Under-Secretary-General of the United Nations, Ceylon's Ambassador to the EEC, Belgium, Luxembourg and the Netherlands, the Permanent Secretary of the Ministry of Planning and Economic Affairs of Ceylon and the Senior Deputy Governor of the Central Bank of Ceylon
  - D.C. Kotelawala, Muhandiram
    - Sir Henry Kotelawala, Member of the Legislative Council and State Council (Uva)
      - Jack Kotelawala, Member of the State Council and Parliament
      - Gladwin Kotelawala, Member of Parliament (Uva)

(Cousins)

    - George L. Kotelawala, (1922–1971) Member of Parliament (Bandaragama)

== Kumaratunga ==
- Sydney Kumaratunga
  - Jeewan Kumaranatunga, Cabinet Minister, Member of Parliament
    - Malsha Kumaratunga, Western Province Council Member
- Vijaya Kumaratunga + Chandrika Kumaratunga, President of Sri Lanka, Prime Minister of Sri Lanka

== Lokubandara ==
- W. J. M. Lokubandara (1941 – 2021), Speaker of the Parliament of Sri Lanka, Government Minister, Member of Parliament, Governor of Sabaragamuwa Province
  - Udith Lokubandara (1984 – ), Member of Parliament

== Macan Markar ==
- Sir Mohamed Macan Markar (1885–1969), Minister of Home Affaires of the State Council, Member of the Legislative Council and Senator.
  - Ahmed Hussain Macan Markar (1893–1984), Member of parliament and Deputy Mayor of Colombo.

== Mallimaratchi ==
- Weerasinghe Mallimarachchi (1929 – ), Minister of Food, Co-operatives and Janasaviya (Poverty Alleviation) Minister of Petroleum Services, State Minister of Industry, District Minister of Colombo Member Of Parliament 1977 – 1994
  - Jayantha Mallimaratchi (1955–1989), Member of Colombo Municipal Council 1978–1989
  - Janaka Mallimaratchi, Member of Western Provincial Council 1993 – 2009

== Mathew ==
- Edley Winston Mathew (27 January 1907 – ) MBE, Member of the House of Representatives for Balangoda
- Cyril Mathew (1912–1989), Government Minister, Member of Parliament
  - Nanda Mathew, Government Minister, Member of Parliament, Governor of Uva Province
- S.S Kulatileke, Government Minister, Member of Parliament (father in law of Nanda Mathew)

== Mendis ==
- Mudaliyar Thenahandi David Mendis, MBE (1904–1977) – Mayor of Negombo (1965–70)
- Thenahandi Wijayapala Mendis (1928–2012) – Government Minister, Member of Parliament, Mayor of Negombo, Minister of Textile Industries (1977–89), Minister of Transport and Highways (1989–94), Leader of the House (1993–4), Chief Opposition Whip (1994–98)
- Thenahandi Nandana Mendis – Chief Minister Western Province
- Thenahandi Davindra Sethwijaya Mendis – Provincial Councillor, Western Province [son of T Wijayapala Mendis]
- Nevil de Silva - Deputy Mayor of Negombo [brother-in-law of T. Wijayapala Mendis]
- Prof. Kamal Karunanayake (1937-2006) Member of Parliament [brother-in-law of T. Wijayapala Mendis]

== Molamure ==
- Sir Francis Molamure, first Speaker of Parliament + Lady Adeline Meedeniya, Member of State Council of Ceylon and Senate (Daughter of J. H. Meedeniya Adigar, Member of the Legislative Council)
  - Seetha Molamure, Member of the Senate of Ceylon
  - A. F. Molamure (nephew of Sir Francis Molamure), Member of Parliament

== Moulana ==
- Seyed Alavi Moulana, Government Minister, Member of Parliament, Governor of Western Province.
- Seyed Ali Zahir Moulana (1956 – ), Government Minister, Member of Parliament (1994–2004, 2015– ), Diplomat, Senior Adviser to the Prime Minister. Played a pivotal role that brought about the end of the Sri Lankan Civil War.

== Muhammedh ==
Ref:

- Mathicham Saleem Lebbe Muhammedh Thamby Vidane alias Muhammedh Vidane (1819–1879) + Amina (1827–1899) of Negombo – He succeeded his father as the Vidane (Village Headman) for part of Negombo (assumed to be for Udayar Toppu area) somewhere around mid 1800AD
  - Meena Muhammedh Thamby + Name not known
    - Yoosoof Lebbe Vidane of Negombo
      - Yoosoof Lebbe Mubarak Vidane of Negombo – He succeeded his father as the Vidane
    - Omardeen Police Vidane(d 1921)of Negombo
      - Omardeen Abdul Wahab Vidane
  - Muhammedh Thamby Samsudheen Vidane Arachchi alias Dheen Arachchi (1860–1915) + Hafsa Marikar (1870–1950) of Negombo – He was appointed as the "Vidane Arachchi " for Negombo in Eighteen Ninety Six (1896)
    - Fathima Zuhara Dheen (1893–1967) + Abdulla Court Mudliyar (d 1944)
      - Safa Abdulla (1914–2007) + Hussain Sheik Ismail Proctor (1901–1974) of Putlam – He entered the field of politics in 1928 when he became a member of the Puttalam Local Board. He was elected as a member of the Puttalam Urban Development Council In 1933. He became its chairman in 1938 and served in that post without a break until 1947. At the first Parliamentary elections which was held in 1947, he was elected uncontested and thus holding the distinction of being referred to as the First Member of the First Independent Parliament of Ceylon. He was appointed as Parliamentary Secretary to the Minister of Food and Co-operatives under the Govt. of Rt. Hon D.S. Senanayake. As a Deputy Minister of food and Co-operatives (1947–1948) he managed to open a large number of Co-operative Societies all over the country. Later on he was elected as the Deputy Chairman of Committees and subsequently, had the distinction of being elected as Deputy Speaker of the House of Representatives. The culmination of Proctor Ismail's political career came when he was unanimously elected as the speaker in 1956, thus creating another first in the annals of Sri Lankan political history; the first Muslim speaker of the parliament of Ceylon (1956–1959)
      - M. Abdulla Thaha (1915–1969) + Kadheeja (1934–1989) – Member of Negombo Urban Council (1944–1949)
      - Abdulla Abdul Rahman Proctor (1921–1998)+ Hamzathul Inaya Abdul Raheeman (1927)
        - Fahima Abdul Rahman (1951) + Sheriff Sabry (1940–2008) of Ratmalana – He was the first Muslim to be appointed as the Auditor General (1993–2000) of Sri Lanka
      - Ummu Aimun Abdulla (1923–2000) + Anis Sheriff JP – He was the first Muslim to be the Deputy Mayor of Negombo Municipal Council and was also a member of the Western Provincial Council.
    - Ismail Dheen Proctor JP (1894–1968) + Hameeda Habeeblebbe (d 1970) – He was the first Muslim to qualify as a Lawyer in Negombo and was also the Quazi for Negombo
    - Samsudheen Abdul Raheeman Proctor JPUM (1896–1965) + Rahma Abdul Azeez (1910–2002) – He was the only Muslim to be the Chairman (1941–1944) of the then Negombo Urban Council.
    - Shareefa Dheen (1897–1986) + Haneefa
      - Haneefa Cafoor (1916–1970) + Jezima Muhammed (d 2001)
        - Aleema Cafoor (1947) + Farook (1937–1996) of Mawanella – He was a Member of the Sabaragamuwa Provincial Council at the time of his death
      - Haneefa Mahroof Proctor JPUM (1919–1990) + Hamzackiya Abdul Raheeman (1931) – He was a member of the Negombo Municipal Council
    - Faleela Dheen (1901–1982) + Thamby Lebbe Abdul Hameed (1894–1959)
      - Sithy Rahma Abdul Hameed (1929–2006) + Abdul Raheem Rafeek JP (1927–1989)
        - Fariha Rafeek (1955) + Caesar Reyan Hassan (1947–2015) of Katugastota – He obtained the highest number of preferential votes for the Pathadumbara Electorate during the local government elections held in Nineteen ninety-one (1991) and thereby became the first Muslim to be the Vice Chairman of the Pathadumbara Pradeshiya Sabava
    - Shums Ruquiya Dheen (1905–1958) + Ali Abul Hassen JP (1903–1997)
      - Hafeela Hassen (1931) + Cassim Proctor JPUM (1923–1985)
        - Ajward Cassim (1955–1995) + Lilyana (1955) – (Migrated to Yugoslavia in 1980s) He was appointed as the Honorary Counsel General of Sri Lanka for Yugoslavia and held this post until his death.
  - Muhammedh Thamby Sinna Lebbe Marikar + Name not known
    - Marikar Abdul Razak Vidane of Negombo

== Nanayakkara ==
- D. Francis Nanayakkara + Irene Nanayakkara (1917–2010)
  - Vasudeva Nanayakkara (1939– ), Government Minister, Member of Parliament + Wasanthi Nanayakkara (Lawyer)
  - Yasapalitha Nanayakkara (1940–1996), Provincial Councillor, Film Director + Manoshri Perera Nanayakkara
    - Harshana Nanayakkara, Minister of Justice(2025-Present)
  - Hemakumara Nanayakkara, Government Minister, Member of Parliament

== Nugawela ==
- Punchi Banda Nugawela, Member of State Council
  - Major E. A. Nugawela, Government Minister, Member of Parliament, Member of State Council

== Obeyesekere ==
- Don Bastian Ferdinandus Wijesiri Guneratne Obeyesekere, Mudaliyar of Talpepattu
  - Sir Solomon Christoffel Obeyesekere, Unofficial Member of the Legislative Council of Ceylon
    - Sir Forester Obeysekera, Speaker of the State Council of Ceylon and a member of the Legislative Council of Ceylon
  - James Peter Obeyesekere I - Maha Mudaliyar
    - Sir James Peter Obeyesekere II - Maha Mudaliyar
      - James Peter Obeyesekere III – Politician, Senator, Government Minister + Sivagami Obeyesekere – Politician, Government Minister, Member of Parliament

(also related to Bandaranaike)

== Pathirana ==
Ref:

- Richard Pathirana – Cabinet minister for Education and Higher Education (1994 to 2000) and State Administration and Home Affairs (2000–01)
  - Ramesh Pathirana – Member of the Parliament of Sri Lanka for Galle district

== Panabokke ==
- Tikiri Bandara Panabokke I – Member of the Legislative Council of Ceylon
  - Sir Tikiri Bandara Panabokke II – Minister of Health in the State Council of Ceylon
    - Theodore Braybrooke Panabokke – Deputy Minister of Justice and Agriculture

== Perera ==
- Festus Perera, Government Minister, Member of Parliament + Larine Perera Member of Parliament, Provincial Minister, Provincial Councillor
  - Niroshan Perera, Member of Parliament and State Minister of Youth Affairs

== Premachandra ==
- Bharatha Lakshman Premachandra, Provincial Councillor, Member of Parliament
  - Hirunika Premachandra, Provincial Councillor, Member of Parliament

== Ponnambalam ==
- G. G. Ponnambalam KC (1901–1977), founder and leader of the All Ceylon Tamil Congress, Government Minister, Member of Parliament, Member of State Council
  - Kumar Ponnambalam (1940–2000), leader of the All Ceylon Tamil Congress, presidential candidate (1982)
    - Gajendrakumar Ponnambalam (1974– ), leader of the All Ceylon Tamil Congress, Member of Parliament

== Premadasa ==
- Ranasinghe Premadasa (1924–1993), President of Sri Lanka, Prime Minister of Sri Lanka, Government Minister, Member of Parliament + Hema Wickrematunge
  - Sajith Premadasa (1967 – ), Leader of the Opposition, Government Minister, Member of Parliament

== Rajakaruna ==
- Sarathchandra Rajakaruna, Government Minister, Member of Parliament, Businessmen
  - Harshana Rajakaruna, Member of Parliament, Businessmen

== Rajapaksa ==
Ref:

- Don David Rajapaksa, Vidane Arachchi
  - D. M. Rajapaksa, Member of State Council, Senator
    - Lakshman Rajapaksa, Member of Parliament
    - George Rajapaksa, Government Minister, Member of Parliament
      - Shyamlal Rajapaksa, Provincial Councilor
      - Nirupama Rajapaksa (1962– ), Government Minister, Member of Parliament
  - D. A. Rajapaksa (1905–1967), Government Minister, Member of Parliament + Dandina Samarasinghe Dissanayake
    - Chamal Rajapaksa (1942– ), Speaker of the Parliament of Sri Lanka, Government Minister, Member of Parliament + Malini Rajapaksa
      - Shasheendra Rajapaksa (1976– ), Chief Minister of Uva Province, Provincial Councillor, Basnayake Nilame of the Ruhunu Kataragama Maha Devalaya
    - Mahinda Rajapaksa (1945–), 6th President of Sri Lanka, Prime Minister of Sri Lanka, Government Minister, Member of Parliament + Shiranthi Rajapaksa
      - Namal Rajapaksa (1986– ), Minister of Sports and Member of Parliament
      - Yoshitha Rajapaksa (1988– ), Prime Minister's Chief of Staff
    - Gotabhaya Rajapaksa (1949– ), 8th President of Sri Lanka, Secretary to the Ministry of Defence and Urban Development + Ioma Rajapaksa
    - Basil Rajapaksa (1951– ), Minister of Finance, Member of Parliament

== Ranatunga ==
- Reggie Ranatunga, Government Minister, Member of Parliament, Governor of Sabaragamuwa Province
  - Arjuna Ranatunga (1963– ), Government Minister, Member of Parliament
  - Prasanna Ranatunga (1967– ), Chief Minister of Western Province, Member of Parliament
  - Ruwan Ranatunga (1971– ), Member of Parliament

== Ratnayaka ==
- S. W. D. Ratnayake – Member of Parliament
  - Sarath Sepala Ratnayake – Assassinated Parliamentary Candidate (22 January 1989)
- Victor Garvin Weerawardana Ratnayake, Member of Parliament
    - Sagala Ratnayaka, Government Minister, Member of Parliament

== Ratwatte ==
Ref:

- Wijayawardena Senevirat Panditha Wahala Mudiyanse
  - Panditha Wahala Mudiyanse Ralahamy Ratwatte + Loku Kumarihamy Ratwatte
    - Loku Nilame Adikaram Ratwatte, 2nd Adigar and Dissawa of Matale+ Meegastenne Amunugama Medduma Kumarihamy
      - Seneviratne Nilame Ratwatte (1827–?) + Amunugama Meegastenne Medduma Kumarihamy
        - Punchi Menika Ratwatte Kumarihamy + Paranagama Loku Mudiyanse
          - Abeyratne Banda Ratwatte Basnayake + Thalgahagoda Lewke Punchi Kumarihamy
            - Sir Cuda Ratwatte Adigar, First Mayor of Kandy.
              - A. C. L. Ratwatte, Mayor of Kandy
              - J. C. Ratwatte Adigar, Member of State Council + Phyllis Sita Aluvihare
                - Charitha Ratwatte, Chairmen of the United National Party
            - Barnes Ratwatte Dissawe (1883–1957), Rate Mahattaya and Dissava of Sabaragamuwa, Senator + Rosalind Mahawelatenne Kumarihamy
              - Sirimavo Bandaranaike (1916–2000), Prime Minister of Ceylon, Member of Parliament, Senator + S. W. R. D. Bandaranaike (1899–1959), Prime Minister of Ceylon, Government Minister, Member of Parliament, Member of State Council
                - Sunethra Bandaranaike (c. 1943– ), politician and socialite
                - Chandrika Kumaratunga (1945– ), President of Sri Lanka, Prime Minister of Sri Lanka, Member of Parliament, Chief Minister of Western Province, Provincial Councillor + Vijaya Kumaratunga (1945–1988), actor and politician
                - Anura Bandaranaike (1949–2008), Speaker of the Parliament of Sri Lanka, Government Minister, Member of Parliament
              - Dr Mackie Ratwatte, Prime Minister's Private Secretary + Chandrika Iranganie Gopallawa
              - Clifford Ratwatte (1927–2009), Member of Parliament
                - Kamal Ratwatte
                - Heshani Ratwatte
            - Harris Leuke Ratwatte (1900–1964), Diyawadana Nilame of the Sri Dalada Maligawa, Member of Parliament, Senator
              - General Anuruddha Ratwatte, Acting Diyawadana Nilame of the Sri Dalada Maligawa, Government Minister, Member of Parliament
                - Lohan Ratwatte (1968– ), Member of Parliament, Provincial Councillor
                - Mahendra Ratwatte, Basnayake Nilame of the Sri Maha Vishnu Devalaya of Kandy, Dedi Munda Devalaya of Aluthnuwara, Mayor of Kandy.

(also related to the Bandaranaike family, William Gopallawa, A.R. Udugama, Hector Kobbekaduwa)

== Sakalasuriya ==
- Sardhatissa Sakalasuriya, member of parliament, chairman of Provincial Council + Chandrika Sakalasuriya, Provincial Councillor
  - Samanmalee Sakalasuriya, Provincial Councillor

== Samarakkody ==
- Edmund Samarakkody, Member of Parliament
- Stephen Samarakkody, Member of Parliament
- Siripala Samarakkody, Member of Parliament
- Panini Ilangakoon, Member of Parliament (brother-in-law)
- Robert Edward Jayatilaka, Member of Parliament (brother-in-law)

== Samaraweera ==
- Mahanama Samaraweera, Government Minister, Member of Parliament+ Khema Samaraweera, member of the Matara Urban Council
  - Mangala Samaraweera (1956– 2021), Government Minister, Member of Parliament

== Samaraweera ==
- Percy Samaraweera, Chief Minister of Uva
  - Upali Samaraweera, Minister of Uva
    - Ravindra Samaraweera, Government Minister, Member of Parliament

== Sangarapillai ==
Ref:

- A. V. Sangarapillai, Founder of Manipay Hindu College
  - Sir S. Pararajasingam, Senator + Pathmavathy Arunachalam
    - Lalithambikai (−2005) + M. Swaminathan
      - D. M. Swaminathan (1945– ), Member of Parliament, Governor of Western Province

(also related to Coomaraswamy, Ulaganathar Mudaliyar of Manipay)

== Saravanamuttu ==
- Sir Ratnasothy Saravanamuttu, first elected Ceylonese Mayor of Colombo, Member of the State Council + Naysum Saravanamuttu, Member of the State Council
- Lieutenant Colonel S. Saravanamuttu, Member of the Colombo Municipal Council

== Sinne Lebbe ==
- Mudaliar Ahamed Lebbe Sinne Lebbe (b.1902), Member of Parliament
  - Abdul Lathiff Sinnalebbe, Member of Parliament
    - Ahamed Rizvi Sinnalebbe (1959–2001), Member of Parliament

== Senadheera ==
- Bandulahewa Senadheera, Member of Parliament + Daya Sepali Senadheera, Member of Parliament.

== Senanayake ==
Ref:

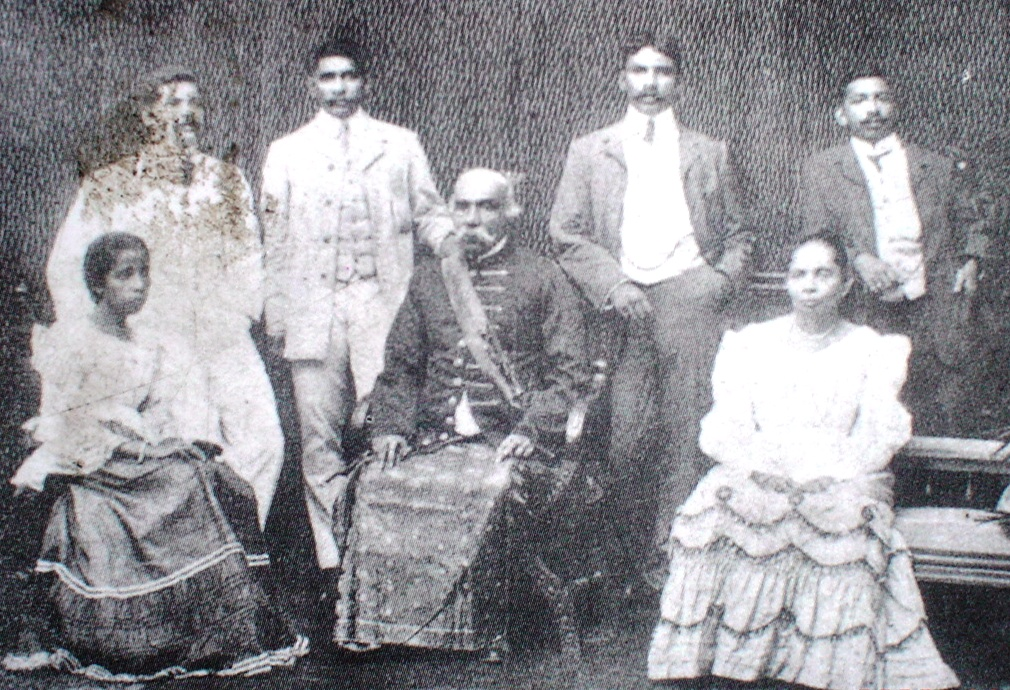
Mudaliyar Don Spater Senanayake with son-in-law F H Dias-Bandaranaike, sons Don Stephen Senanayake, Don Charles Senanayake and Fredrick Richard Senanayake, daughter Maria Francesca and wife Dona Catherina Elizabeth Perera Gunasekara

- Don Bartholomew Senanayake
  - Don Spater Senanayake (1848–1907), Mudaliyar + Dona Catherina Elizabeth Perera Gunasekera Senanayake (1848–?)
    - Don Charles Senanayake (1878–1931) + Euphemia Grace Millicent
      - Ivy Senanayake (1911–1984) + Dr Edmond Asoka Bulankulame (1900–1978)
        - Visakha Bulankulame (1935–1999) + Tissa Wijeyeratne (1923–2002)
    - Fredrick Richard Senanayake (1882–1926), Member of Legislative Council and independence activist + Ellen Attygalle
      - Richard Gotabhaya Senanayake (1911–1970) Government Minister, Member of Parliament
    - Don Stephen Senanayake (1884–1952), Prime Minister of Ceylon, Member of Parliament, Member of State Council, Member of Legislative Council
      - Dudley Senanayake (1911–1973), Prime Minister of Ceylon, Government Minister, Member of Parliament
      - Robert Parakrama Senanayake (1913–1986)
        - Ranjani Senanayake + Ranjith Wijewardene
          - Ruwan Wijewardene (1975– ), Cabinet Minister and Member of Parliament
        - Rukman Senanayake (1948– 2024), Assistant Leader of United National Party, Government Minister, Member of Parliament
        - Ranjit Senanayake + Suwanitha
          - Vasantha Senanayake (1973– ), Member of Parliament

(also related to Sir John Lionel Kotelawala, Junius Richard Jayewardene, Ranjan Wijeratne and Ranil Wickremesinghe)

== Senewiratne ==
- Captain C. P. J. Senewiratne, Government Minister, Member of Parliament
  - Lakshman Senewiratne (1957– ), Government Minister, Member of Parliament

Buddhika P. Senevirathne

== Senaratne ==
- Rajitha Senaratne, Government Minister, Member of Parliament
  - Chathura Senarathne, Member of the Parliament

== Tissera ==
- Protus Tissera, member of parliament (Nattandiya 1970-1977), provincial council member (north western province) 1988-1993
  - Dayasritha Tissera, member of parliament (Puttalam 2001-2004), Deputy minister 2004-2007, non-cabinet minister skills development 2007-2010, cabinet minister state development 2010-2015, provincial council member (north western province) 1999-2000
- Sumal Tissera, nattandiya pradesiya sabha opposition leader 2002-2004, provincial Council member (north western province) 2004-2008, provincial Council Minister (north western province) 2008-2020

== Tennakoon ==
- T. B. Tennakoon, Government Minister, Member of Parliament
  - Yasaratne Tennakoon, Member of Parliament, Adviser to the Prime Minister
    - Tilina Tennakoon, Member of Parliament
  - Janaka Bandara Tennakoon (1953– ), Government Minister, Member of Parliament"JANAKA BANDARA TENNAKOON". Directory of Members. Parliament of Sri Lanka. Archived from the original on 6 October 2010.
    - Pramitha Bandara Tennakoon, Provincial Council Minister – Central Province

== Tennakoon ==
- Mudiyanse Tennakoon, Member of Parliament
  - Soma Kumari Tennakoon, Member of Parliament

== Tambimuttu ==
- E. R. Tambimuttu
    - Sam Tambimuttu, Member of Parliament
      - Arun Tambimuttu

== Thondaman ==
- V. E. K. R. Karuppaiah (Kumaravel) + Sithammai
  - Savumiamoorthy Thondaman (1913–1999), founder and leader of the Ceylon Workers' Congress, Government Minister, Member of Parliament + Kothai
    - Ramanathan Thondaman
      - Arumugam Thondaman (1964 - 2020), leader of the Ceylon Workers' Congress, Government Minister, Member of Parliament + Rajalakshmi
        - Jeewan Thondaman (1994-) Government Minister, Member of Parliament
        - (Cousins)
        - Senthil Thondaman, Former Uva Provincial Council Minister

== Ulaganathar of Manipay ==
Ref:

Madava Mudaliyar (Birth between 1580 – 1600)

Kathirkama Mudali

- Ulaganathar Mudaliyar of Manipay 1664
  - Ulaganathar Mathar Mudaliyar
    - Mathar Kathirgamakanakkar
      - Kathirgamakanakkar Thillaiampalam
        - Thillaiampalam Arunachalam, Mudaliyar
          - A. Ponnambalam (1814–1887), Mudaliyar of the Governor's Gate + Sellachchi Coomaraswamy
            - P. Coomaraswamy (1849–1906), Member of Legislative Council
            - Sir Ponnambalam Ramanathan KCMG QC (1851–1930), Solicitor General of British Ceylon, Member of Legislative Council + Sellachchi Ammal + Leelawathy Ramanathan (1870–1953)
              - Rajendra
                - Srimani + Sangarapillai Pathmanathan
                  - Deshamanya Justice P. Ramanathan (1932–2006) – Supreme Court judge, Governor of Western Province
              - Sivagamasundari + S. Natesan, Member of Parliament, Member of State Council, Senator
            - Sir Ponnambalam Arunachalam KCMG CCS (1853–1924), Member of Executive Council, Member of Legislative Council + Swarnambal Namasivayam
              - Arunachalam Padmanabha
              - Sir Arunachalam Mahadeva KCMG (1888–1969), Government Minister, Member of Legislative Council, Member of State Council, High Commissioner to India
                - Balakumar (Baku) Mahadeva (1921–2013)
              - Arunachalam Ramanathan
              - Pathmavathy Arunachalam + Sir S. Pararajasingam, Senator
                - Pararajasingham Nadesan
                - Lalithambikai (−2005) + M. Swaminathan
                  - D. M. Swaminathan (1945– ), Member of Parliament, Governor of Western Province

(also related to Coomaraswamy)

== Viswanather-Arumugam-Cathiravelu ==
- Vinayakar Viswanather
  - Viswanather Arumugam
    - Arumugam Canagaratnam, Member of Legislative Council
    - Arumugam Cathiravelu, Magistrate and District Judge
      - Cathiravelu Sittampalam CCS (1898–1964), Government Minister, Member of Parliament
      - Cathiravelu Ponnambalam, first mayor of Jaffna
  - Viswanather Casipillai, Crown Proctor

== Wadigamangawa ==
- Abhayarathne Wadigamangawa, Lawyer, Sri Lanka Freedom Party Organiser for Panduwasnuwara (D 1977)
- Saddhatissa Wadigamangawa, Member of Parliament - Anamaduwa, Sri Lanka Freedom Party (1977)
- Ashoka Wadigamangawa, Member of Parliament - Puttalam District, United National Party (1989)

== Wanniarachchi ==
- Dharmadasa Wanniarachchi, Government Minister, Member of Parliament, Governor of North Western Province
  - Pavithra Devi Wanniarachchi (1964– ), Government Minister, Member of Parliament + Kanchana Jayaratne, Chairman, Sabaragamuwa Provincial Council
- W A Karunasena, Member of Parliament (1960–67)

== Wickremesinghe ==
- C. L. Wickremesinghe CMG, First Sinhalese Government Agent of Sri Lanka + Esme Moonemalle Goonewardene of Moonemalle Walauwa Kurunegala whose aunt was married to Sir Richard Aluwihare.
  - Esmond Wickremesinghe + Nalini Wijewardena, daughter of D. R. Wijewardena, granddaughter of J. H. Meedeniya Adigar Member of the Legislative Council of Ceylon, niece of Lady Adeline Molamure née Meedeniya, the first female public representative of Ceylon.
    - Ranil Wickremesinghe, 8th Executive President of Sri Lanka.
  - Mukta Wickremesinghe + Sam Wijesinha from the Wijesinha family of Getamanna Wattehena Walauwa.
    - Prof. Rajiva Wijesinha
  - Bishop Lakshman Wickremasinghe, the Youngest Bishop of Kurunegala and social activist.

== Wickremasinghe ==
- D. P. Wickremasinghe, Government Minister, Member of Parliament
  - Neranjan Wickremasinghe, Deputy Minister, Member of Parliament

== Abeywardena Wickremasinghe ==
1. Dr. S.A. Wickremasinghe is the first leftist member to elect to the State council in 1931 in Sri Lanka. Dr. S.A. Wickremasinghe represent the state council and Parliament since 1931–1977.
2. W.P.A. Wickremasinghe member of parliament in Sri Lanka's first ever Parliament in 1947.
3. Doreen Wickremasinghe member of parliament 1951–1956.
4. Dayananda. A. Wickremasinghe member of parliament and Minister of United National Party Government in 1977–1994.
5. Percy Wickremasinghe member of parliament 1970–1977

== Welagedara ==
- Dingiri Bandara (D.B) Welagedara (1915–1989), Government Minister, Member of Parliament, Governor of North Central Province
  - Sarath Welagedara, (1946– ) State Minister, Member of Parliament

== Wickremanayake ==
- Ratnasiri Wickremanayake (1933–2016), Prime Minister of Sri Lanka, Government Minister, Member of Parliament
  - Vidura Wickremanayake, Member of Parliament, Provincial Councillor

== Wijewardene ==
Ref:

- Tudugalage Muhandiram Don Phillip Wijeywardene – Muhandiram + Dona Helena Dep Weerasinghe
  - Don Richard Wijewardena (1886–1950) + Alice Meedeniya
    - Ranjith Wijewardene + Ranjani Senanayake
      - Ruwan Wijewardene (1975– ), Member of Parliament, Cabinet Minister
    - Nalini Wijewardene + Esmond Wickremesinghe
      - Ranil Wickremasinghe (1949– ), 9th President of Sri Lanka, Prime Minister of Sri Lanka, Government Minister, Member of Parliament
    - Rani Wijewardene + George Gomes
      - Shalini Gomes + Themiya Loku Bandara Hurulle, Member of Parliament, Project Minister (Science and Technology), Member,(North Central Provincial Council), Director-General, Telecommunications Regulatory Commission of Sri Lanka (T.R.C.S.L.), Engineer (AC&R)
  - Don Charles Wijewardene (1893-19??) + Vimala Wijewardene, Member of Parliament, Minister of Health
    - Padmini Wijewardene
    - Rukmani Wijewardene + C Beligammana
    - Ananda Wijewardene
  - Don Walter T Wijewardene (1894–1939) + Anula Kalyanawathi Wijesinghe
    - Upali Wijewardene (1938–1983) + Lakmini Ratwatte
    - Anoja Devi Wijewardene (1933–2014) + Prof Stanley Wijesundera (1923 -1989)
      - Shalitha Wijesundera, Member of the Western Provincial Council
  - Don Phillip Alexander Wijewardene + Neeva Hulugalle
    - Iranganie Wijewardene + Donald Joseph Wijewardene
      - Nelun Kumari Wijewardene + William Tissa "Tommy" Ellawala
      - Amari Wijewardene, Ambassador to the United Kingdom
  - Don Edmund Wijewardene + Corin Amanda Jennings
    - Dr Phillip Revatha "Ray" Wijewardene – Chancellor University of Moratuwa + Seela de Mel
      - Anoma Wijewardene
      - Roshini Wijewardene
      - Mandy Wijewardene
  - Agnes Helen Wijewardene + Eugene Wilfred Jayewardene (1874–1932), Chief Justice
    - Junius Richard Jayewardene (1906–1996), President of Sri Lanka, Prime Minister of Sri Lanka, Government Minister, Member of Parliament, Member of State Council
    - Hector Wilfred Jayewardene (1916–1990)
  - Don Luis Wijewardene + Muriel Godamunne
    - Donald Joseph Wijewardene + Iranganie Wijewardene
      - Nelun Kumari Wijewardene + William Tissa "Tommy" Ellawala
      - Amari Wijewardene – Ambassador to the United Kingdom
    - Semitha Wijewardene + Victor Tennekoon, Chief Justice
      - Dayanthi Tennekoon + Dayantha Athulathmudali

Other members of the family include;

- Sir Henry De Mel
- J. H. Meedeniya Adigar

== Wijeratne (Mirigama) ==
- Mahendra Surasinghe Wijeratne, Government Minister, Member of Parliament
  - Udena Wijerathna, Provincial Councillor

== Wijeyeratne ==
Ref:

- Gabrial Perera Wijeyeratne + Dona Catherina Wickremasinghe Jayasekera
  - Sir Edwin Wijeyeratne (1889–1968), Cabinet Minister of Home Affairs and Rural Development, Senator, High Commissioner to Britain and India, one of Founding Members of the United National Party + Leela Pethiyagoda Kumarihamy
    - Tissa Wijeyeratne (1923–2002), politician, diplomat, Barrister-at-Law and businessman He was also Additional Secretary to the Ministry of External Affairs and Defence, Senior Advisor (Foreign Affairs) to the Prime Minister + Visakha Bulankulame
    - Dr Nissanka Wijeyeratne (1924–2007), Diyawadana Nilame of the Sri Dalada Maligawa, Cabinet Minister of Education, Higher Education & Justice, Member of Parliament (1977–1989), Ambassador to the Soviet Union + Nita Dullewe
      - Neranjan Wijeyeratne (1956– ), Diyawadana Nilame of the Sri Dalada Maligawa, Leader of the Opposition in the Kandy Municipal Council + Devika Mediwake
      - Mano Wijeyeratne (1957–2011), Government Minister of Plantation, Government Minister of Enterprise Development, Member of Parliament + Dushyanthi Wegodapola (first marriage) & Barathi Wijeratne (2nd marriage)
      - Anuradha Dullewe Wijeyeratne,(1962– ), Ex Acting Diyawadana Nilame of the Sri Dalada Maligawa, Provincial Councillor+ Dayanganie Gunasekara

(also related to Senanayake, Ratwatte and Gopallawa)

== Yapa Abeywardena ==
- Mahinda Yapa Abeywardena (1945– ), Government Minister of Agriculture, Chief Minister, Member of Parliament
  - Sarath Yapa Abeywardena, Provincial Councillor
- Lakshman Yapa Abeywardena (1955– ), Government Minister, Member of Parliament
  - Pasanda Yapa Abeywardena, Politician, Provincial Councillor
