= M. P. Jothipala =

Ceylonese businessman and politician

Hon. M. P. Jothipala

Member of the Ceylonese Parliament for Balangoda
- In office 19 April 1956 – 5 December 1959
- Preceded by: E. W. Mathew
- Succeeded by: M. L. M. Aboosally

Personal details
- Party: Lanka Sama Samaja Party
- Other political affiliations: Mahajana Eksath Peramuna
- Spouse: Hettitantrige née Dayawathi
- Children: 3
- Occupation: politician

Madduma Patabendige Jothipala was a Ceylonese businessman and politician.

Madduma Patabendige Jothipala was the second of nine children born to Madduma Patabendige Davith Silva, a general merchant in Kahawatta, and Guardiaya Kankanamge Misiliya Nona, of Guru Gedera, Denuwala. He married Hettitantrige Dayawathi of Kathaluwa and they had three children: Kapila (b.1952); Gnanakeerthi Kumara (b.1956); and Kumudu Sriyakanthi (b.1961).

In April 1951 he contested the parliamentary by-election for the seat of Balangoda, representing the Lanka Sama Samaja Party, following the death of the sitting member, Sir Francis Molamure. He received 13,440 votes (36% of the total vote), losing to the United National party candidate, Jayaweera Kuruppu, by 8,722 votes. He ran again for Balangoda at the 2nd parliamentary election, held between 24 May 1952 and 30 May 1952, finishing third behind the two United National Party candidates.

He was ultimately successful in getting elected as the second member of the Parliament of Ceylon for Balangoda at the 3rd parliamentary election, where he polled 20,032 votes (15% of the total vote).

At the 4th parliamentary elections, held in March 1960, Jothipala ran in the newly created electorate of Pelmadulla, as the Mahajana Eksath Peramuna nominee. He was unsuccessful finishing third, receiving 3,685 votes (25% of the total vote) 850 votes behind the Sri Lanka Freedom Party candidate, W. A. Karunasena. At the subsequent parliamentary elections in July 1960 he ran again, finishing third, receiving 1,254 votes (8% of the total vote). He also contested the 1965 general elections, finishing third again, polling 522 votes (2.5% of the total vote).
