= William Ellawala =

Sri Lankan politician

Ancestors of the Mahawalatenne family. 1 to 8 William Ellawala, William Ellawala Jn., Mahawalatenne Rate Mahattaya, Cyril Ellawala, Francis Theodore Ellawala, Sylvia Ellawala, Harry Ellawala, Agnes Mahawalatenne (Nee Ellawala)

William Ellawala (5 September 1835 - ?) was a Ceylonese legislator. He was the Kandyan Sinhalese member of the Legislative Council of Ceylon. He was appointed to the post of Rate Mahatmaya by the British Government of Ceylon.

William Ellawala was born on 5 September 1835, the son of Banda from Sabaragamuwa. He was educated at the Ratnapura School and S. Thomas' College, Mutwal. He joined the government service in the Native Department and in 1856 was appointed as Rate Mahatmaya of Kolonne Korale in the Sabaragamuwa Province.

In 1892 he was appointed as the nominated unofficial member representing the Kandyan Sinhalese community in the Legislative Council of Ceylon. He served in that position until 1897.

He married Jane Petronella Senanayake, daughter of Mudaliyar Don Bartholomew Senanayake. Their daughter Agnes Ellawala married S.D. Mahawalatenne Rate Mahattaya of Balangoda, son of Mahawelatenne Wickremasinghe Chandrasekere Seneviratne Pandita Mudiyanse Ralahamillage Harold David Mahawelatenne and Florence Alexandra De Saa Bandaranayake. Their daughters were Jane Mahawalatenne and Rosalind Mahawalatenne. Jane married Abraham Obeyesekere Jayawardena, a grandson of Maha Mudaliyar Lambertus Obeyesekere of Kataluwa Walawwa and Rosalind married Barnes Ratwatte Dissawe. Thereby his great-granddaughter Sirimavo Bandaranaike became the first female prime minister in the world while his great great granddaughter Chandrika Bandaranaike became the first female Executive President of Sri Lanka. His niece Viollet Ellawala married John Hercules Meedeniya whose nephew Ranil Wickremesinghe became the President of Sri Lanka.

== See also ==
- List of political families in Sri Lanka
