= Clifford Ratwatte =

Sri Lankan politician

Hon. Clifford Ratwatte

Parliamentary Secretary to the Minister of Agriculture, Food, Co-operatives and Fisheries
- In office 1964–1965

Member of Parliament for Balangoda electorate
- In office 1960–1965

Personal details
- Born: 19 March 1927
- Died: 10 February 2009 (aged 81)
- Party: Sri Lanka Freedom Party
- Spouse: Mallika Ratwatte
- Relations: Sirimavo Bandaranaike (sister)
- Education: S. Thomas' College, Mount Lavinia
- Occupation: Politics
- Profession: Planter

Clifford Senaka Ratwatte (19 March 1927 – 10 February 2009) was a Sri Lankan politician. He was a former Parliamentary Secretary to the Minister of Agriculture, Food, Co-operatives and Fisheries in 1964 Member of Parliament for Balangoda, Chairman of the State Plantations Corporation and the Sri Lanka Tea Board.

== Early life ==
Ratwatte was born to a prominent Radala family, who were descended from Ratwatte Dissawa, Dissawa of Matale, a signatory on behalf of the Sinhalese to the Kandyan Convention of 1815. Ratwatte was born on 19 March 1927 in Balangoda, one of six children to Barnes Ratwatte Dissawa (later a member of the State Council of Ceylon and the Senate of Ceylon) and Rosalind Mahawelatenne Kumarihamy, daughter of Mahawalatenne Rate Mahatmaya of Balangoda. His eldest sister was Sirimavo Bandaranaike, who was the 7th Prime Minister of Ceylon and the modern world's first female head of government.

Ratwatte had his primary school education at St. Agnus’ Convent in Balangoda and his secondary school education at S. Thomas' College, Mount Lavinia. He married a distant cosine, Mallika Ellawala and began his career as a tea planter in Balangoda.

== Political career ==
In 1954 he was elected as a Councillor to the Balangoda Town Council. In 1957 he became the president of the Balangoda Urban Council until he resigned in 1968.

Ratwatte was elected to Parliament in March 1960, from the Balangoda electorate. He was subsequently re-elected at the general election in July. He was appointed Parliamentary Secretary to the Minister of Agriculture and Irrigation. However, he was unseated in 1965 in an election petition. His wife Mallika Ellawala Ratwatte contested his seat in the by-election in 1966 and won and was re-elected in 1970. But was defeated in 1977.

== Later work ==
He produced the 1974 film, The God King and the 1975 film Kaludiya Dahara. He also served as the Chairman of the State Plantations Corporation and the Sri Lanka Tea Board.

== Family ==
Ratwatte had two children, Kamal and Heshani. His son Kamal Ratwatte, served as the Chairman, Sri Lanka Bureau of Foreign Employment; Deputy Chairman, Airport & Aviation Services and Basnayake Nilame (Lay Custodian) of the Sabaragamuwa Maha Saman Devalaya in Ratnapura.

== See also ==
- List of political families in Sri Lanka
