= A. F. Molamure =

A. F. Molamure may refer to:

- Alexander Francis Molamure, Speaker of parliament
- Alexander Francis Molamure Jr, Ceylonese politician
