= Maduwanwela Maha Dissava =

Wickramasinghe Wijesundara Ekanayake Abeykoon Mudiyanse Ralahamilage Sir James Williams Maduwanwela (known as Maduwanwela Maha Disawe ) (1844–1930) was a Ceylonese colonial-era headmen. He was appointed to the post of Dissâva by the British Government of Ceylon.

== Government service ==
He was educated at Royal College Colombo. He entered public service under the British administration as a clerk and was promoted as Korale Mahaththaya there after holding the position of Rate Mahatmaya and finally appointed as Dissâva.

== Wealth ==
Maduwanwala claimed to have inherited an 83,000-acre "nindagama" or land grant in the Kolonne area from his father, which he claimed to have been gifted to the family by King Wimaladharmasooriya II. He built a large fortune from this land through timber trading, gem mining and elephant kraals (paddocks), most notably the Elephant Kraal in Panamure which had been started by the Maduwanwela Maha Disawe in the late 1800s while he was a Rate Mahatmaya along with J.T. Ellawela. Through these proceeds Maduwanwela Disawe expanded his family seat Maduwanwela Walawwa.

== Family ==
Maduwanwela Disawe married twice. His first wife Ekneligoda Kumarihami died giving birth to their only child, a daughter named Dingiri Appey who was a cripple. He married again, Kalawana Kumarihami, a close relative; they had no children, and she predeceased him. Before his death, he placed his wealth in trust for his daughter, placing his nephew, Francis Molamure, and Kalawana Kumarihami's nephew, Cyril Dangamuwa, as trustees. He died on 6 September 1930 from heart disease.

== See also ==
- List of political families in Sri Lanka

== External links & References ==
- The Meedeniya Ancestry
