= Mallika Ratwatte =

Ceylonese politician (1932–2017)

Hon. Mallika Ellawala Ratwatte

Member of Parliament for Balangoda electorate
- In office 1966–1977

Personal details
- Born: 12 April 1932
- Died: 18 May 2017 (aged 85)
- Party: Sri Lanka Freedom Party
- Spouse: Clifford Ratwatte
- Occupation: Politics

Mallika Eslin Ratwatte (née Ellawala) (13 April 1932 – 18 May 2017) was a Ceylonese politician. She was a Member of Parliament from the Balangoda electorate.

== Early life and family ==
Born Mallika Eslin Ellawala, to the Radala Ellawala family in Ratnapura. She married Clifford Ratwatte, a planter who was the son of Barnes Ratwatte Dissawa, a member of the State Council of Ceylon and sister of Sirimavo Bandaranaike who would become Prime Minister of Ceylon.

== Political career ==
Clifford Ratwatte entered politics in 1954 as member of Sri Lanka Freedom Party which was formed by his brother-in-law S.W.R.D. Bandaranaike; he was elected to parliament from the Balangoda electorate in March 1960 and was re-elected in July 1960 and 1965, but was unseated in 1966 in an election petition.

Mallika Ratwatte, then contested in her husband's seat of Balangoda in the by-election in 1966 from the Sri Lanka Freedom Party and won, entering parliament. She again contested in the Balangoda electorate and won in the 1970 parliamentary elections, defeating a distant cousin Seetha Seneviratne, 18,808 votes to 11,616 votes. She was defeated in the 1977 parliamentary elections by the United National Party candidate M.L.M. Aboosally by 19,502 votes to 15,829 votes.

== See also ==
- List of political families in Sri Lanka
