= Adeline Molamure =

Sri Lankan legislator (1890–1977)

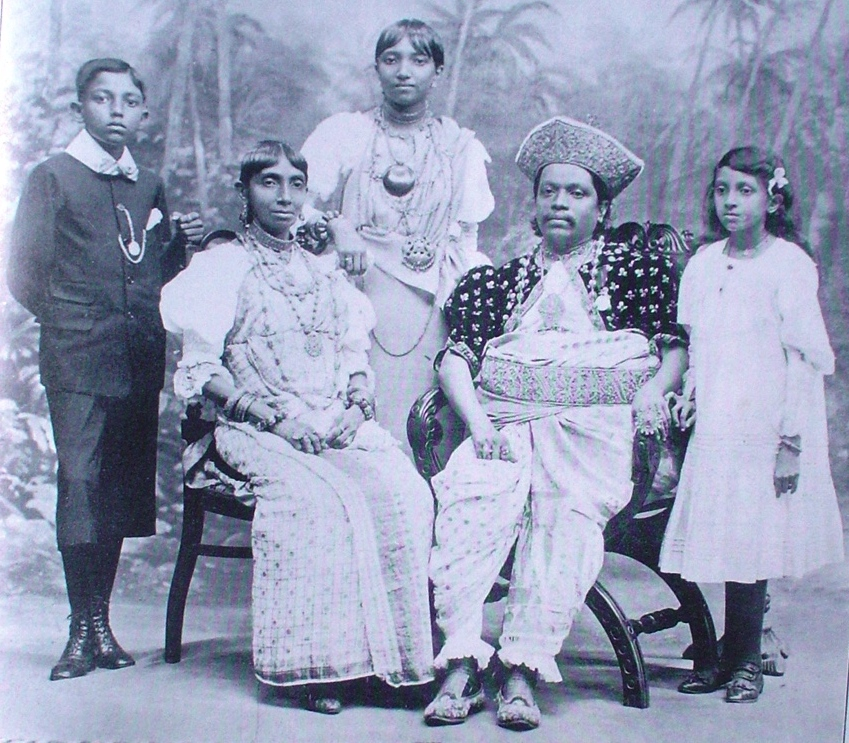
Mr Kuruppu alias William Henry Meediniya with his family in 1905 including daughters Adeline and Alice.

Adeline, Lady Molamure, CBE (née Meedeniya; 1890 – 1977) was the first female member of State Council of Ceylon, and therefore, the first elected female legislator in Sri Lanka. She was the Deputy President of the Senate of Ceylon.

Educated at Bishop's College, Colombo, she was the daughter of J.H. Meedeniya Adigar, member of the Legislative Council of Ceylon.

She was elected to the State Council by election in 1931 from her father's electoral seat after his death. She was later elected to the Senate in 1947 and was appointed as a Deputy President of the Senate in 1955. She was appointed a Commander of the Order of the British Empire in the 1955 Birthday Honours.

She was the daughter of J.H. Meedeniya Adigar, grandson of Humbadee Dissawa, who served under the last king of Kandy and Cornelia Magdeline Senanayake, the daughter of Rev. Cornelius Senanayake, an Anglican priest and Corneliya Regina Obeysekere of Kataluwa Walawwa who was the sister of Lambertus Obeyesekere, Maha Mudaliyar.

Her sister was Alice Wijewardena who married D. R. Wijewardena (the founder of Lake House newspaper group) and her brother was Joseph Hercules Meedeniya who became the Rate Mahatmaya of Ratnapura, married Violet Ellawela. They had four children, which included Iranganie Serasinghe and Kamani Vitharana who married Professor Tissa Vitharana. Her sister's grandson Ranil Wickremasinghe would later become the President of Sri Lanka.

She was married to Sir Francis Molamure, the first speaker of the State Council and Parliament. Their only daughter Seetha Molamure was appointed a member of the Senate of Ceylon. She married L. J. Seneviratne a civil servant who became the Secretary of the Treasury.

== See also ==
- List of political families in Sri Lanka
