= Mackie Ratwatte =

Sri Lankan physician

Dr Mackie Ratwatte was a Sri Lankan physician. He was a former Private Secretary to the Prime Minister of Sri Lanka and Director General and Secretary of the Fifty Summit Conference of Non-Aligned Countries.

Ratwatte was born to a prominent Radala family, who were descended from Ratwatte Dissawa, Dissawa of Matale, a signatory on behalf of the Sinhalese to the Kandyan Convention of 1815. Born to Barnes Ratwatte Dissawa and Rosalind Mahawelatenne Kumarihamy of Mahawelatenne Walauwa, Balangoda, his eldest sister was Sirimavo Bandaranaike the first female prime minister in the world. He was educated at Trinity College, Kandy and the Colombo Medical College.

== See also ==
- List of political families in Sri Lanka
