= J. H. Meedeniya =

Ceylonese politician

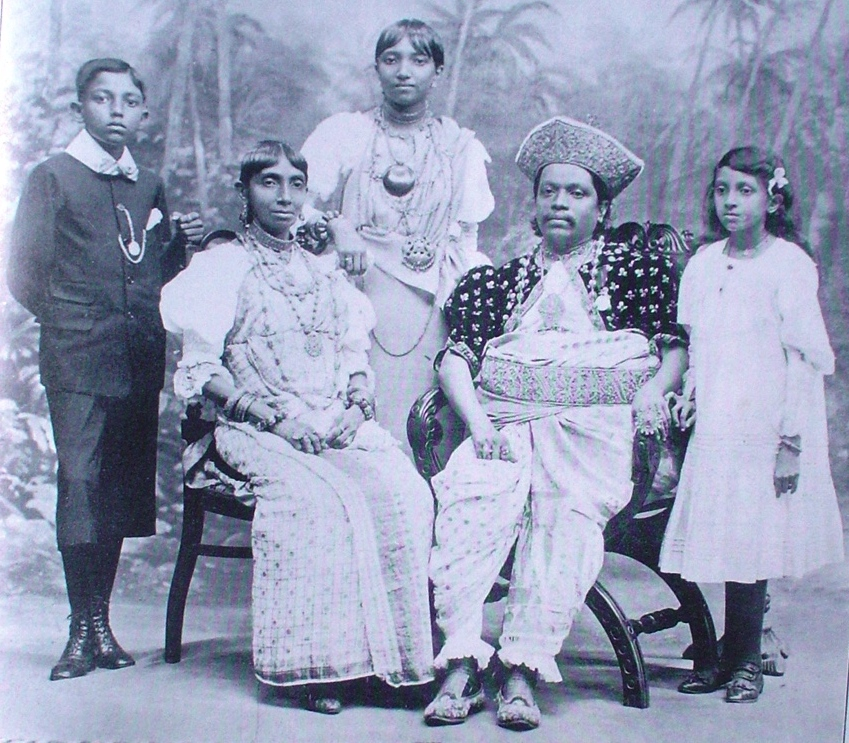
John Henry Meedeniya with his family in 1905 including daughters Adeline and Alice.

Rajakaruna Senanayaka Panditha Herath Wasala Kuruppu Mudiyanse Ralahamillage Punchi Banda John Henry Meedeniya (known as J. H. Meedeniya Adigar ) (1867 - 1931) was a Ceylonese legislator and a headmen. He was the Kandyan Sinhalese member of the Legislative Council of Ceylon and elected member of the State Council of Ceylon for Ruwanwella. He was awarded the title of Adigar by the British Government of Ceylon.

== Early life and career ==
Punchi Banda Meedeniya was born in 1867 in Marapona, Kegalle District, to Loku Banda Meedeniya, Deputy Coroner for Colombo, Kandy, Ratnapura and Trincomalee. Meedeniya was educated at S. Thomas' College, Mutwal. He entered public service as a Clerk at the Colombo Kachcheri in 1886. After serving in several posts including that of Deputy Coroner, he was appointed as a Rate Mahatmaya in 1897 and was awarded the honorary title of Dissawa and thereafter Adigar in 1920. He was appointed a member of the Legislative Council of Ceylon and elected to the State Council of Ceylon as the member for Ruwanwella.

== Family ==
Punchi Banda Meedeniya is the grandson of Hunubadde Nilame, Mideniye Senanayaka Rajakaruna Panniki Mudihanse, who served under the last king of Kandy (See D' Olyly's Diary 19 April 1815). He married Cornelia Magdeline Emily Senanayake, daughter of Rev. Cornelius Senanayake, a prominent Sinhalese Anglican priest, scholar, and landowner, Corneliya Regina Obeysekere of Kataluwa Walawwa who was the sister of Lambertus Obeyesekere, Maha Mudaliyar. His eldest daughter was Alice Wijewardena who married D. R. Wijewardena (the founder of Lake House newspaper group) and his younger daughter Adeline Molamure, succeeded her father and was elected to his seat and became the first female member of State Council of Ceylon thereby the first elected female legislator in Sri Lanka. Adeline was married to Sir Francis Molamure, the first speaker State Council and Parliament. His son, Joseph Hercules Meedeniya who became the Rate Mahatmaya of Ratnapura, married Violet Ellawela. They had four children, who included Iranganie Serasinghe and Kamani Vitharana who married Professor Tissa Vitharana. J. H. Meedeniya's great-grandson Ranil Wickremasinghe would later become the President of Sri Lanka.

== See also ==
- List of political families in Sri Lanka
- Old United States Chancery, Colombo

== External links & References ==
- The Meedeniya Ancestry
