= D. M. Swaminathan =

Sri Lankan Tamil lawyer, politician and cabinet minister

Hon. D. M. Swaminathan
- தே. ம. சுவாமிநாதன்
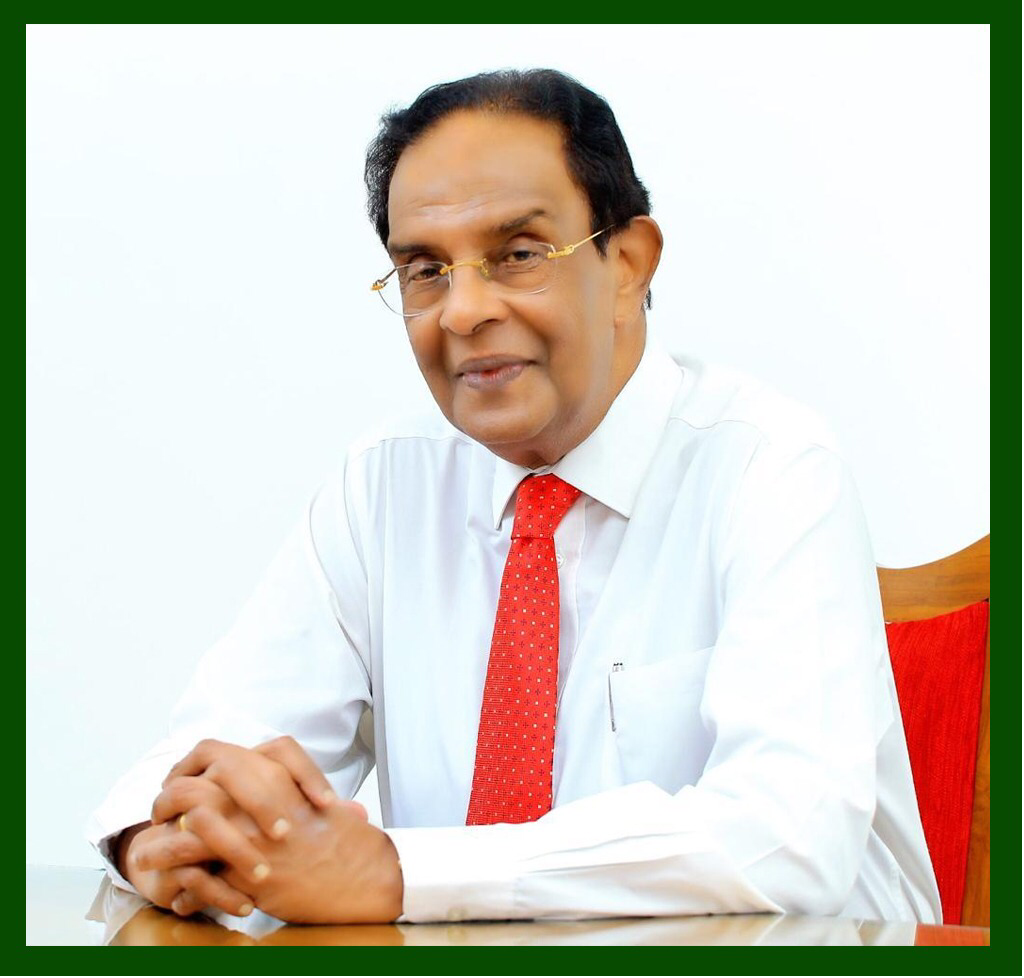

Minister of Prison Reforms, Rehabilitation, Resettlement and Hindu Religious Affairs (Note: Minister of Resettlement, Reconstruction and Hindu Religious Affairs (January 2015 - August 2015); Minister of Rehabilitation and Resettlement (August 2015 - September 2015); Minister of Rehabilitation, Resettlement and Hindu Religious Affair (September 2015 - November 2015))
- In office 12 January 2015 – 18 November 2019

Member of Parliament for National List
- In office 2010–2020

2nd Governor of Western Province
- In office 11 July 1994 – 1 December 1994
- Preceded by: Suppiah Sharvananda
- Succeeded by: K. Vignarajah

Personal details
- Born: Deva Manoharan Swaminathan; 30 April 1945 (age 81)
- Party: United National Party
- Other political affiliations: United National Front for Good Governance
- Spouse(s): Gayathri Swaminathan (née Carthigesan)
- Children: Shobana, Prakash
- Education: Ceylon Law College
- Profession: Lawyer
- Ethnicity: Sri Lankan Tamil
- Religion: Hindu

Deva Manoharan Swaminathan (Tamil: தேவ மனோகரன் சுவாமிநாதன், Sinhala: දේවා මනෝහරන් ස්වාමිනාදන්; born 30 April 1945) is a Sri Lankan Tamil lawyer, politician and ex cabinet minister.

== Early life and family ==
Swaminathan was born on 30 April 1945. He is the son of M. Swaminathan and Lalithambikai (daughter of S. Pararajasingam and grand daughter of P. Arunachalam). He was educated at Royal College, Colombo. After school he joined Ceylon Law College, qualifying as an advocate of the Supreme Court.

== Career ==
After qualifying Swaminathan started practising law in Colombo, taking over the chambers of proctor Ratnakaram which were renamed D. M. Swaminathan Associates in 1971.

Swaminathan was appointed Governor of Western Province in June 1994 after the controversial dismissal of Suppiah Sharvananda by President D. B. Wijetunga. He was appointed chairman of the National Savings Bank in March 2002, serving until 2004.

Swaminathan was appointed as one of the United National Party's (UNP) National List MPs in the Sri Lankan Parliament following the 2010 parliamentary election. In October 2010 he was appointed to the Parliamentary Council which was established by the controversial 18th Amendment to make non-binding recommendations the president on the membership of various national commissions. After the 2015 presidential election he was appointed Minister of Resettlement, Reconstruction and Hindu Religious Affairs by newly elected President Maithripala Sirisena.

Swaminathan was re-appointed as a National List MP following the 2015 parliamentary election. He was appointed Minister of Rehabilitation and Resettlement on 24 August 2015. He was given the additional portfolio of Hindu Affairs on 4 September 2015. He was given the additional portfolio of Prison Reforms on 11 November 2015.

Swaminathan has been a member of the Rotary Club of Colombo since 1971. He is a trustee of the Sri Ponnambala Vaneswara Temple at Sea Street in Kochchikade, Colombo which was founded by his great-great-grand father A. Ponnambalam. He is one of the UNP's vice-chairmen. He was also treasurer of the UNP.

== Notes ==
Political offices
| Preceded by Suppiah Sharvananda | Governor of Western Province; 1994 | Succeeded by K. Vignarajah |
