= Chandima Gamage =

Sri Lankan politician

Hon. Chandima Gamage MP

Member of Parliament for Anuradhapura District
- Incumbent
- Assumed office 2015

Personal details
- Party: United National Party
- Other political affiliations: United National Front for Good Governance
- Spouse: Priyanka Gamage
- Children: Chamanka Gamage, Chenuka Gamage

Chandima Gamage is a Sri Lankan politician and a member of the Parliament of Sri Lanka. He was elected from Anuradhapura District in 2015. He is a Member of the United National Party. He is the son of G. D. Mahindasoma.

== See also ==
- List of political families in Sri Lanka
