= L. J. Seneviratne =

Secretary to the Treasury
- In office 14 October 1954 – 14 August 1956

Leopold James de Silva Seneviratne, CCS (25 October 1899 - 19??) was a Sri Lankan civil servant. Who served as the Secretary to the Treasury.

Graduated from the University of London with the LLB and qualified as a barrister from the Lincoln's Inn, he became an advocate and started his legal practice on his return to Ceylon. He was appointed a cadet of the Ceylon Civil Service in 1923 by the secretary of state for the Colonies and served in the Kachcheris in Matara, Jaffna and Kegalle. Promoted an officer, he served in as Police Magistrate in Puttalam, Point Pedero and an assistant settlement officer. He then served as Deputy Tea Controller, Secretary to the Ceylonese delegation to India, Assistant Government Agent, Kandy, Deputy Civil Defence Commissioner and Additional Land Commissioner. From 1947 to 1953 he was the Permanent Secretary, Ministry of Education and from 1953 to 1954, he was the Deputy Secretary to the Treasury. He was appointed Secretary to the Treasury in 1954 succeeding Sir Arthur Ranasinha and served till 1956.

He was married to Seetha Seneviratne, a member of the Senate of Ceylon. She was the daughter of Sir Francis Molamure and Lady Adeline Molamure. Their children were Lakshman Chandra Seneviratne (L. C. Seneviratne), President's Counsel and Sunethra Seneviratne who married Sepala Ilangakoon who was the Chairman and Managing Director of Mackwoods Estates as well as Chairman of the Tea Board.
