= Seetha Seneviratne =

Ceylonese politician (1914–1998)

Seetha "Sita" Seneviratne (née Molamure) (1914–1998) was a Ceylonese politician. She was a member of the Senate of Ceylon and member of the Parliament of Sri Lanka for Balangoda.

== Early life and family ==
Seetha was the only child of Sir Alexander Francis Molamure (the first speaker of both the State Council of Ceylon and Parliament of Ceylon) and Lady Adeline (the first female member of State Council of Ceylon). She married Leopold James de S. Seneviratne of the Ceylon Civil Service, who went on the serve as Secretary to the Treasury. Their children were Lakshman Chandra (PC) and Sunethra who married Sepala Ilangakoon, the Chairman and Managing Director of Mackwoods Estates, as well as the Chairman of the Tea Board.

== Political career ==
In March 1965 she unsuccessfully contested in the Pelmadulla electorate at the 6th parliamentary election, as the United National Party candidate, where she lost to the incumbent, W. A. Karunasena, of the Sri Lanka Freedom Party by 3,340 votes. She again unsuccessfully contested the October 1967 by-election for Pelmadulla, this time against Dharmadasa Wanniarachchi, who defeated her 12,627 votes to 9,842 votes.

In 1967 she was appointed to the Senate and had served as the Chairperson of the National Council for Child and Youth Welfare. She resigned from the Senate in April 1970. At the 7th parliamentary elections in May 1970 she ran as the United National Party candidate in the Balangoda electorate, and was elected the second member from Balangoda coming behind the Sri Lanka Freedom Party candidate, Mallika Ratwatte, 11,616 votes to 18,808 votes.

== See also ==
- List of political families in Sri Lanka
