= L. O. Abeyaratne =

Ceylonese pediatrician

L. O. Abeyaratne OBE FRCP

Personal details
- Born: Lloyd Oscar Abeyratne; 28 May 1893
- Died: 27 January 1978 (aged 84)

Lloyd Oscar Abeyratne (28 May 1893 – 27 January 1978) was a Ceylonese pediatrician. A former member of Parliament, he was the first pediatrician appointed to the Lady Havelock Hospital for Women and Children.

Abeyratne was educated at Carey College, Colombo and Trinity College, Kandy, before entering the Ceylon Medical College in 1912. He qualified as a medical doctor in 1918 having gained a Licentiate in Medicine and Surgery and later gained his MRCP and FRCP from the Royal College of Physicians of Edinburgh. Having joined the Ceylon Medical Service, he served as District Medical Officer (DMO) in Balangoda, Puttalam and Trincomalee. Transferring to the Lady Havelock Hospital for Women and Children in December 1937, he was the first pediatrician appointed to the island and served till 1954. He was appointed an Officer in the Order of the British Empire in the 1952 Birthday Honours for services at the Lady Havelock Hospital for Women and Children. Having formed the Ceylon Sri Lanka Paediatric Association in 1954, he was its president from 1954 to 1957. Following his retirement from the medical service, he served as a consultant pediatrician at the Lady Ridgeway Hospital for Children till 1978.

He was appointed to the House of Representatives by the Governor-General, Sir Oliver Goonetilleke in 1960 and served till 1964. He died on 27 January 1978.

He was married to Dr Maria Augusta Pinto, and their daughter was Vidya Jyothi Dr Beatrice Vivienne De Mel, who was also a pediatrician at the Lady Ridgeway Hospital for Children.
