= E. W. Mathew =

Ceylonese lawyer and politician

Hon. Edley Winston Mathew MBE

Member of the Ceylon Parliament for Balangoda
- In office 1947–1956
- Preceded by: seat created
- Succeeded by: V. T. G. Karunaratne

Personal details
- Born: 27 January 1909
- Died: 23 December 1978 (aged 69) Sri Lanka
- Party: United National Party
- Profession: Proctor

Edley Winston Mathew, MBE (27 January 1907 – 23 December 1978) was a Ceylonese lawyer and politician.

Mathew, a proctor and notary by profession, was elected to parliament at the 1st parliamentary election held between 23 August 1947 and 20 September 1947, representing the United National Party (UNP), as the second member for the Balangoda electorate. The first member, Alexander Francis Molamure, also representing the UNP received 23,076 votes (37.4% of the total vote) and Mathew 13,767 votes (22.3% of the total vote). The Balangoda electoral district was one of five multi-member constituencies, with two members, the others were Ambalangoda-Balapitiya, Badulla, Colombo Central and Kadugannawa.

Mathew retained his seat at the 2nd parliamentary election, held between 24 May 1952 and 30 May 1952, where he secured 20,710 votes (27% of the total vote). In May 1952 he was invested as a Member of the Order of the British Empire (Civil Order) in the Queen's Birthday Honours.

He was unsuccessful at the 3rd parliamentary elections, where he only received 15,759 votes (12% of the total vote) and was defeated by the Sri Lanka Freedom Party candidate, V. T. G. Karunaratne, who polled 36,591 votes and M. P. Jothipala, the Lanka Sama Samaja Party candidate with 20,032 votes.
