= Balangoda Electoral District =

Electoral district of Sri Lanka

Balangoda electoral district was an electoral district of Sri Lanka between August 1947 and February 1989. The district was named after the town of Balangoda in Ratnapura District, Sabaragamuwa Province. The 1978 Constitution of Sri Lanka introduced the proportional representation electoral system for electing members of Parliament. The existing 160 mainly single-member electoral districts were replaced with 22 multi-member electoral districts. Balangoda electoral district was replaced by the Ratnapura multi-member electoral district at the 1989 general elections, the first under the proportional representation system. The Balangoda electoral district was one of five multi-member constituencies, with two members, the others were Ambalangoda-Balapitiya, Badulla, Colombo Central and Kadugannawa.

== Members of Parliament ==
Key

Independent SLFP UNP

Election	Member 1	Party	Term	Member 2	Party	Term
1947	Alexander Francis Molamure	UNP	1947 - 1951	E. W. Mathew	UNP	1947 - 1952
1951 by-election	Jayaweera Kuruppu	UNP	1951 - 1952	E. W. Mathew	UNP	1947 - 1952
1952	Alexander Francis Molamure Jr	UNP	1952 - 1956	E. W. Mathew	UNP	1952 - 1956
1956	V. T. G. Karunaratne	SLFP	1956 - 1960	M. P. Jothipala	LSSP	1956 - 1960
1960 (March)	Clifford Ratwatte	SLFP	1960 - 1966	M. L. M. Aboosally	UNP	1960 - 1970
1960 (July)	Clifford Ratwatte	SLFP	1960 - 1966	M. L. M. Aboosally	UNP	1960 - 1970
1965	Clifford Ratwatte	SLFP	1960 - 1966	M. L. M. Aboosally	UNP	1960 - 1970
1966 by-election	Mallika Ratwatte	SLFP	1966 - 1977	M. L. M. Aboosally	UNP	1960 - 1970
1970	Mallika Ratwatte	SLFP	1966 - 1977	M. Sita Seneviratne	UNP	1970 - 1977
1977	M. L. M. Aboosally	UNP	1977 - 1989	Mallika Ratwatte	SLFP	1977 - 1989

== Elections ==
=== 1947 Parliamentary General Election ===
Results of the 1st parliamentary election held between 23 August 1947 and 20 September 1947:

Candidate	Party	Symbol	Votes	%
Alexander Francis Molamure	United National Party	House	23,076	37.36
E. W. Mathew	United National Party	Elephant	13,767	22.29
W. A. P. Jayatilake	Lanka Sama Samaja Party	Hand	9,833	15.92
M. Rajendram	Independent	Pair of Scales	7,329	11.86
W. S. Thurai Raja	Independent	Chair	3,870	6.27
Valid Votes			57,875	93.69
Rejected Votes			3,899	6.31
Total Polled			61,774	100.00
Registered Electors			63,438	
Turnout				097.38

=== 1951 Parliamentary By Election ===
Results of the parliamentary by-election held 28 April 1951:

Candidate	Party	Symbol	Votes	%
Jayaweera Kuruppu	United National Party	House	22,162	59.67
M. P. Jothipala	Lanka Sama Samaja Party	Lamp	13,440	36.19
S. Sri Kandam		Hand	936	2.52
Valid Votes			36,541	98.39
Rejected Votes			598	1.61
Total Polled			37,139	100.00
Registered Electors			63,438	
Turnout				58.54

=== 1952 Parliamentary General Election ===
Results of the 2nd parliamentary election held between 24 May 1952 and 30 May 1952:

Candidate	Party	Symbol	Votes	%
Alexander Francis Molamure Jr	United National Party	Lamp	32,233	42.09
E. W. Mathew	United National Party	House	20,710	27.05
M. P. Jothipala	Lanka Sama Samaja Party	Elephant	16,640	21.73
C. V. Ranawaka	Sri Lanka Freedom Party	Hand	3,337	4.36
Valid Votes			72,920	95.23
Rejected Votes			3,653	4.77
Total Polled			76,573	100.00
Registered Electors			56,096	
Turnout				1.37

=== 1956 Parliamentary General Election ===
Results of the 3rd parliamentary election held between 5 April 1956 and 10 April 1956:

Candidate	Party	Symbol	Votes	%
V. T. G. Karunaratne	Sri Lanka Freedom Party	Hand	36,591	28.22
M. P. Jothipala	Lanka Sama Samaja Party	Key	20,032	15.45
E. W. Mathew	United National Party	Aeroplane	15,759	12.16
A. F. Molamure	United National Party	Elephant	13,873	10.70
S. Sirikandan	Independent	Lamp	532	0.41
Valid Votes			126,961	97.92
Rejected Votes			2,691	2.08
Total Polled			129,652	100.00
Registered Electors			100,326	
Turnout				1.29

=== 1960 (March) Parliamentary General Election ===
Results of the 4th parliamentary election held on 19 March 1960:

Candidate	Party	Symbol	Votes	%
Clifford Ratwatte	Sri Lanka Freedom Party	Hand	9,494	51.07
M. L. M. Aboosally		Mortar	5,051	27.17
W. J .A. Wimaladharma	United National Party	Elephant	1,843	9.91
S. Godakumbura		Cartwheel	894	4.81
D. B. J. Godage		Key	768	4.13
R. F. Dela		Bell	228	1.23
L. M. Gunasekera Banda		Umbrella	202	1.09
Valid Votes			18,480	99.40
Rejected Votes			112	0.60
Total Polled			18,592	100.00
Registered Electors			22,687	
Turnout				81.95

=== 1960 (July) Parliamentary General Election ===
Results of the 5th parliamentary election held on 20 July 1960:

Candidate	Party	Symbol	Votes	%
Clifford Ratwatte	Sri Lanka Freedom Party	Hand	11,201	60.94
M. L. M. Aboosally	United National Party	Elephant	7,077	38.50
Valid Votes			18,278	99.45
Rejected Votes			102	0.56
Total Polled			18,380	100.00
Registered Electors			22,687	
Turnout				81.02

=== 1965 Parliamentary General Election ===
Results of the 6th parliamentary election held on 22 March 1965:

Candidate	Party	Symbol	Votes	%
Clifford Ratwatte	Sri Lanka Freedom Party	Hand	14,498	55.54
M. L. M. Aboosally	United National Party	Elephant	11,274	43.19
H. M. Bandaranayake		Cartwheel	114	0.44
T. H. Gunadasa		Sun	113	0.43
Valid Votes			25,999	99.59
Rejected Votes			107	0.41
Total Polled			26,106	100.00
Registered Electors			30,050	
Turnout				86.88

=== 1966 Parliamentary By Election ===
Results of the parliamentary by-election held 24 October 1966:

Candidate	Party	Symbol	Votes	%
Mallika Ratwatte	Sri Lanka Freedom Party	Hand	14,471	52.28
M. L. M. Aboosally	United National Party	Elephant	12,731	45.99
N. Piyadasa		Mortar	338	1.22
Valid Votes			27,540	99.49
Rejected Votes			141	0.51
Total Polled			27,681	100.00
Registered Electors			30,050	
Turnout				92.12

=== 1970 Parliamentary General Election ===
Results of the 7th parliamentary election held on 27 May 1970:

Candidate	Party	Symbol	Votes	%
Mallika Ratwatte	Sri Lanka Freedom Party	Hand	18,808	60.86
Seetha Seneviratne	United National Party	Elephant	11,619	37.60
S. Srikandam		Eye	222	0.72
B. Delgoda		Chair	176	0.57
Valid Votes			30,825	99.74
Rejected Votes			80	0.26
Total Polled			30,905	100.00
Registered Electors			34,715	
Turnout				89.03

=== 1977 Parliamentary General Election ===
Results of the 8th parliamentary election held on 21 July 1977:

Candidate	Party	Symbol	Votes	%
M. L. M. Aboosally	United National Party	Elephant	19,502	52.18
Mallika Ratwatte	Sri Lanka Freedom Party	Hand	15,829	42.35
A. William		Key	1,676	4.48
W. S. Arachchi		Bell	258	0.69
Valid Votes			37,265	99.70
Rejected Votes			111	0.30
Total Polled			37,376	100.00
Registered Electors			41,554	
Turnout				89.95
