= Jayaweera Kuruppu =

Ceylonese politician (1908–1962)

Hon. Jayaweera Kuruppu
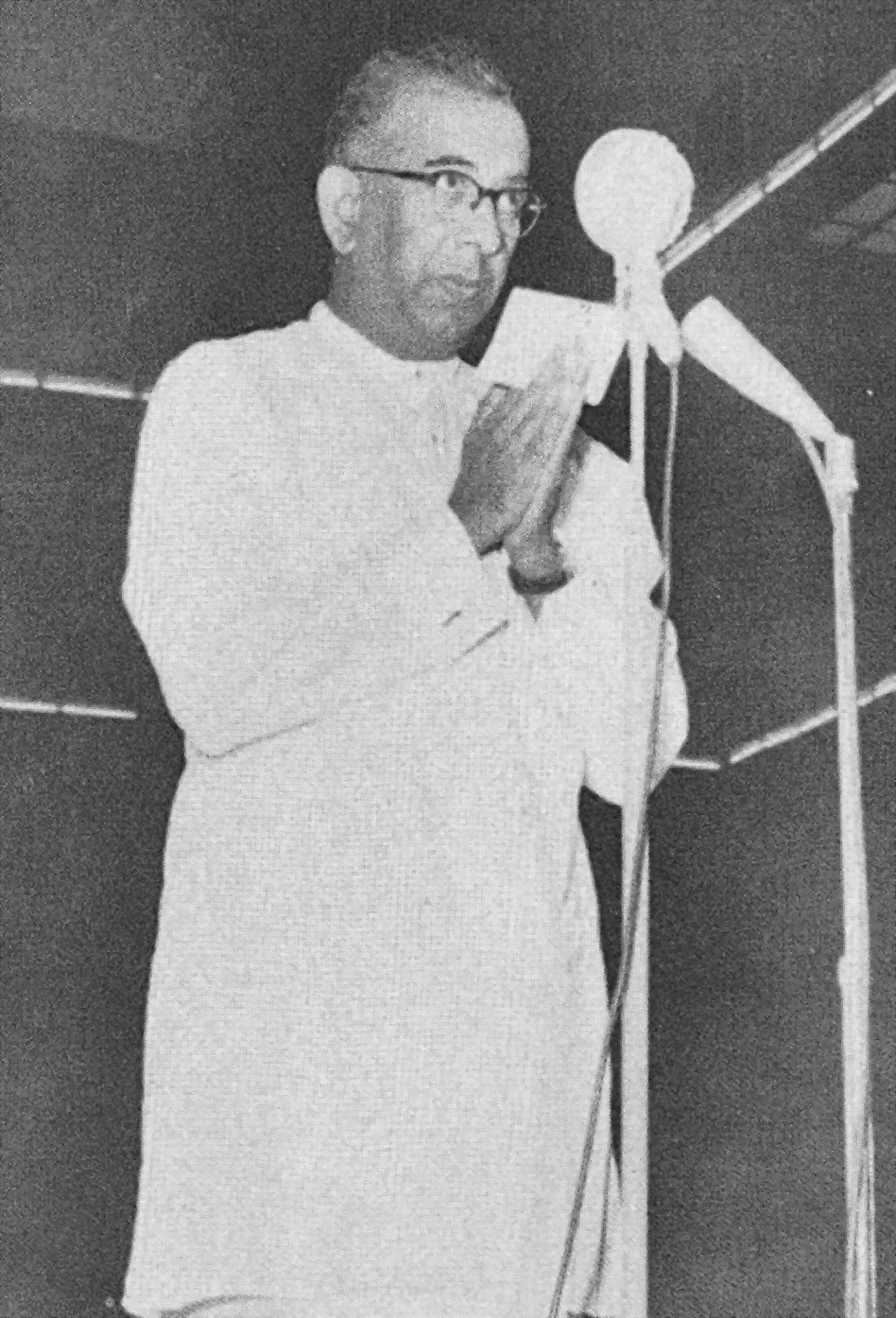

1st Minister of Culture & the Arts
- In office 1956–1959
- Prime Minister: S. W. R. D. Bandaranaike
- Succeeded by: P. B. G. Kalugalla

Member of the Ceylon Parliament for Balangoda
- In office 1951–1952
- Preceded by: Alexander Francis Molamure
- Succeeded by: A. F. Molamure

Member of the Ceylon Parliament for Ratnapura
- In office 1956–1959
- Preceded by: C. E. Attygalle
- Succeeded by: Harold Weragama

Personal details
- Born: 20 January 1908 Ratnapura, Sri Lanka
- Party: United National Party, Sri Lanka Freedom Party
- Spouse: Clara née Wijesuriya
- Children: Chitral Ranjith (son)
- Profession: politician

Jayaweera Kuruppu (20 January 1908 – 1962) was a Ceylonese politician.

In 1936 he served as the vice chairman of the Provincial Council of Ratnapura and in 1944 he was elected as the chairman of the Ratnapura Urban Council.

At the 1st parliamentary election, held between 23 August 1947 and 20 September 1947, Kuruppu contested the Nivitigala electorate, as the United National Party (UNP) candidate, where he was narrowly defeated by 24 votes, by the Lanka Sama Samaja Party candidate, Don Frank Hettiarachchi.

Following the death of Sir Alexander Francis Molamure, the member for Balangoda, in January 1951, the UNP selected Kuruppu as its candidate in the subsequent by-election, in preference to his nephew, A. F. Molamure. Following the by-election, held 28 April 1951, Kuruppu was elected to parliament, receiving 60% of the total votes, 8,722 votes clear of the LSSP candidate. Two months later in July in support of S. W. R. D. Bandaranaike he and four other members of the Sinhala Maha Sabha faction resigned from the UNP and crossed the floor. On 2 September Bandaranaike held the inaugural meeting of the Sri Lanka Freedom Party (SLFP), of which Kuruppu was a founding member.

Rather than re-contest Balangoda at the 2nd parliamentary election, Kuruppu ran in the Kiriella electorate, as the SLFP candidate, securing 7,369 votes, a shortfall of 2,609 votes to his UNP rival, A. E. B. Kiriella (who received 48% of the total vote).

Kurrupu then ran for election at the 3rd parliamentary election, held between 5 April 1956 and 10 April 1956, in Ratnapura electorate, where he polled 16,644 votes (70.75% of the total vote), comprehensively beating the UNP candidate and sitting member, Cyril Eugene Attygalle, by 10,358 votes. He was subsequently appointed as the Minister of Local Government and Cultural Affairs in the S. W. R. D. Bandaranaike cabinet.

In 1959 he was elected the president of the All Ceylon Buddhist Congress, a position he served in for a year.
