= Panamure =

Village in Sagarabamuwa, Sri Lanka

Coordinates: 6°21′N 80°46′E

Panamure is a village located in the Ratnapura District, Sabaragamuwa Province, Sri Lanka. It is approximately 171 kilometres (106 mi) from Colombo and 55 kilometres (34 mi) from Ratnapura.

The village is significant because it is the site of the last elephant kraal in Sri Lanka, Panamure Eth Gala (පනාමුරේ ඇත්ගාල සහ දිය බුබූල). Elephant kraals had been held in Panamure twelve times: 1896, 1898, 1902, 1907, 1912, 1914, 1918, 1922, 1924, 1929, 1944 with the last in 1950. The area was part of the 40,000 ha (99,000 acres) virgin forest belonging to Sir Francis Molamure and the kraal was built around a natural water spring, “Diya Bubula”.

In 1950 seventeen wild elephants were herded into the kraal, with a large bull elephant becoming agitated when the matriarch elephant was noosed, charging the tamed elephants trying to corral the herd. After numerous attempts to noose the bull elephant the hunters decided to shoot and kill it. The resultant public outcry to this killing was so significant that the government passed a law banning elephant kraals, and the capture and killing of elephants.

There are a number of other historical places around the village apart from Panamure Eth Gala including Maduwanwela Walawwa, Kawanthissa Rajamaha Viharaya, and Walalgoda Tampita Raja Maha Viharaya.
