= M. L. M. Aboosally =

Sri Lankan planter and politician

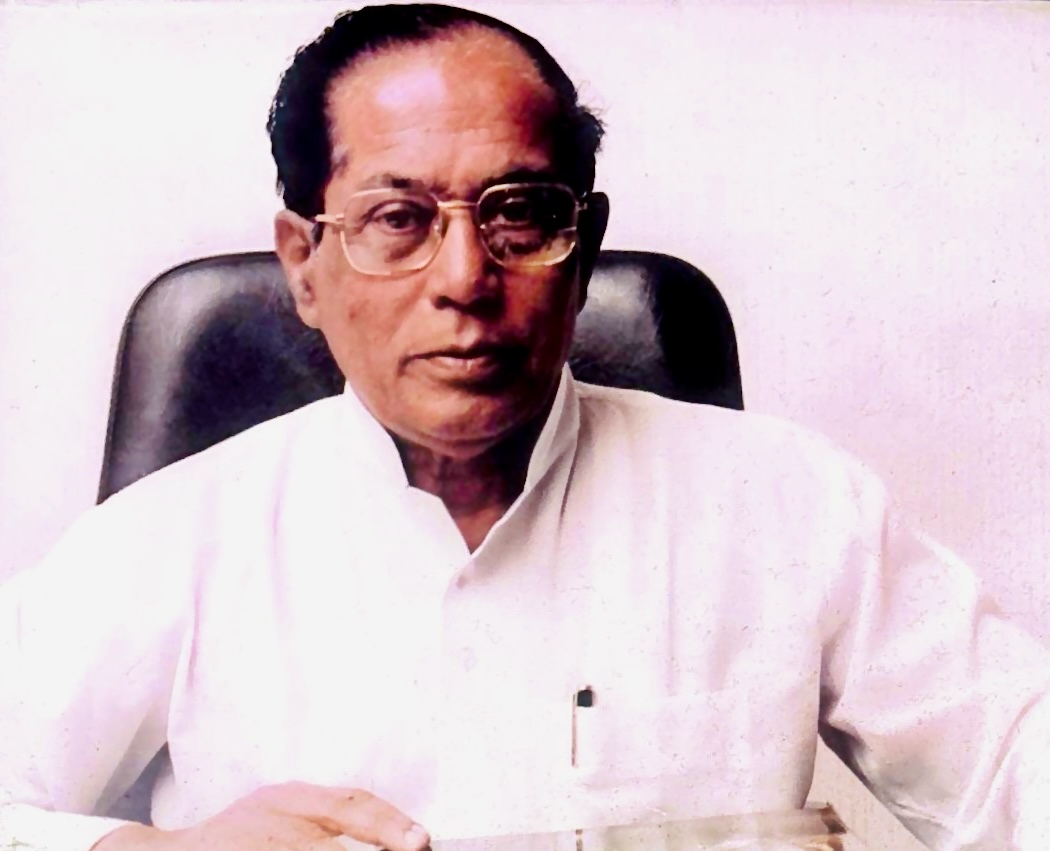
Deshabandu Mohamed Lebbe Marikkar Aboosally photographed in October, 1989 - during is his time in the Plantation Ministry as Minister of Plantation Services.

Deshabandu Mohamed Lebbe Marikkar Aboosally (2 September 1920 - December 2005) was a Sri Lankan planter and politician. He served as Minister of Labour and Non-Cabinet Minister of Plantation Services in the Premadasa government, Deputy Minister for Mahaveli Development and District Minister for Ratnapura in the Jayewardene government. He was a member of the Parliament of Sri Lanka for Balangoda.

From 1960, Aboosally served as the United National Party organizer for the Balangoda Electorate and served as a member and Chairman of the Balangoda Urban Council. He was elected to parliament as the second member from Balangoda in the March 1960 general election and was reelected in the July 1960 general election, the 1965 general election and the 1966 by election. He did not contest the 1970 general election. He was elected the first member from Balangoda in the 1977 general election and was reelected in the 1989 general election from Ratnapura. A. C. M. Ameer, Attorney General of Ceylon (1966–1970), was his brother-in-law.
