= Barnes Ratwatte =

Sri Lankan politician

Barnes Ratwatte (known as Barnes Ratwatte Dissawa; 1883 – 20 September 1957) was a Ceylonese colonial-era legislator and headman. He was a member of the State Council and the Senate of Ceylon. He was appointed to the posts of Rate Mahatmaya of Balangoda and Dissawa by the British. He was the father of Sirimavo Bandaranaike, the first female prime minister in the world.

== Early life ==
Barnes was born to the Ratwatte family, an old Radala family hailing from the Kingdom of Kandy, who were courtiers of Sinhalese monarchs, including Ratwatte, Dissawa of Matale, a signatory to the 1815 Kandyan Convention.

His father was Abeyratne Banda Ratwatte, Basnayake Nilame of the Maha Vishnu Devale and shroff of the Mercantile Bank of India in Kandy, and his mother was Thalgahagoda Lewke Punchi Kumarihamy, daughter of Thalgahagoda Rate Mahatmaya of Matale. He had two brothers Sir Cuda Ratwatte Adigar who served as Mayor of Kandy and Harris Leuke Ratwatte who was former Diyawadana Nilame of Sri Dalada Maligawa, Kandy.

Educated at Trinity College, Kandy, Ratwatte married Rosalind Mahawelatenne Kumarihamy, daughter of Mahawalatenne Rate Mahatmaya of Balangoda. Married under the Binna marriage tradition of the Kandyan law, Ratwatte became the executor of his wife's properties inherited from his father-in-law and also succeeded his father-in-law's government post of Rate Mahatmaya of Balangoda.

== Career ==
He was later given the title of Dissawa by the British Governor of Ceylon. He was elected as member of the State Council for Kegalle from 1936 to 1947, and was elected Member of Parliament for Mawanella from the United National Party from 1947 to 1952.

== Family ==
Barnes Ratwatte was married to Rosalind Mahawelatanne, daughter of Agnes Ellawalea and Samuel David Mahawelatanne (son of Mahawelatenne Wickremasinghe Chandrasekere Seneviratne Pandita Mudiyanse Ralahamillage Harold David Mahawelatenne and Florence Alexandra De Saa Bandaranayake). Barnes and his wife had six children including four sons Barnes Ratwatte II, Dr Seevali Ratwatte, Dr Mackie Ratwatte and Clifford Ratwatte, former Member of Parliament for Balangoda and Chairman of the State Plantations and Sri Lanka Tea Board. Of their two daughters; the elder one, Sirimavo Ratwatte, was married to Solomon West Ridgeway Dias Bandaranaike, son of Sir Solomon Dias Bandaranaike, the Maha Mudaliyar (chief native interpreter and advisor to the Governor), who became the third Prime Minister of Ceylon. The younger daughter, Patsy Ratwatte was married to Colonel Edward James Divitotawela, who founded the Central Command of the Ceylon Army. His granddaughter Chandrika Kumaratunga was President of Sri Lanka and his grandson Anura Bandaranaike, was a former speaker and cabinet minister.

== See also ==
- List of political families in Sri Lanka

== External links & References ==
- The Ratwatte Ancestry
