= Alexander Francis Molamure Jr =

Ceylonese politician

Hon. Alexander Francis Molamure

Member of the Ceylon Parliament for Balangoda
- In office 1952–1956

Personal details
- Party: United National Party

Alexander Francis Molamure was a Ceylonese politician.

Born to A. H. Molamure, he was a nephew of Sir Francis Molamure. Molamure was educated at S. Thomas' College, Mount Lavinia, where he played for the college cricket team in the Royal-Thomian.

The United National Party selected Jayaweera Kuruppu to succeed his uncle Sir Francis Molamure who died in office as the Speaker of parliament in preference to him in the by-election in 1951. Kuruppu soon after left the party to join S. W. R. D. Bandaranaike when he left the United National Party. Molamure contested the 1952 general election from the United National Party and was elected to the House of Representatives of Ceylon. He contested the 1956 general election from Balangoda, but polled fourth and lost his seat.
