= Ratwatte Nilame =

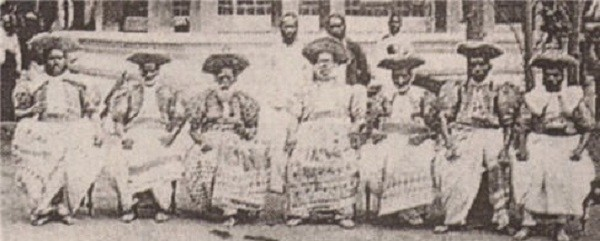
Kandyan Convention Signatories

Loku Nilame Adikaram Ratwatte ( - 1827) (known as Ratwatte Nilame) was a courtier of the Kingdom of Kandy. He was the 2nd Adigar (Adigaram) from 1825 to 1827 during the British rule. He was one of the signatories of the Kandyan Convention which made the Kandyan Kingdom part of the British Empire.

== Early life ==
He was born to a Radala family of courtiers, his father Ratwatte Loku Nilame Adigar, mother Meegastenne Amunugama Medduma Kumarihamy . His paternal grand father Panditha Wahala Mudiyanse Ralahamy Ratwatte.

== Royal and government service ==
He joined the Royal court as part of the Royal household. Ratwatte was appointed Dissawa of Matale in 1815. In this capacity he signed the Kandyan Convention as one of the Chiefs of the Kingdom of Kandy. He held this post during the Uva Rebellion until 1824. In 1825 he was appointed to the post of 2nd Adigar and the year before through a proclamation his ancestral lands were exempted from tax.

== Family ==
He married, Abeykoon Amunugama kumarihamy, their grandsons were Seneviratne Nilame Ratwatte & Abeyratne Ratwatte.

== See also ==
- List of political families in Sri Lanka
