= Manipay Hindu College =

- மானிப்பாய் இந்து கல்லூரி

Location
- Sangarapillai Road; Manipay, Jaffna District; Sri Lanka; 9°42′53.10″N 79°59′44.40″E

Information
- School type: Public National (APS) 1AB
- Motto: For God and Country (கடவுளுக்காகவும், நாட்டுக்காகவும்)
- Founded: 4 July 1910
- Founder: Mr.V.Sangarapillai
- School district: Valikamam Education Zone
- Authority: Ministry of Education (Sri Lanka)
- Category: National School
- School number: 1012020
- Principal: Mr.T.Thileepkumar
- Teaching staff: 121
- Grades: 6-13
- Gender: Boys
- Age range: 11-19
- Houses: Sundarar, Sambandar, Manikkar and Vakeesar
- Colors: Red and Blue

Manipay Hindu College (Tamil: மானிப்பாய் இந்து கல்லூரி Māṉippāy Intu Kallūri, Sinhala: මනිපායි හින්දු විද්‍යාලය Manipayi Hindu Vidyalaya) is a provincial school in Manipay, Sri Lanka. The college was founded by A. V. Sangarapillai, father of Senator Sir Sangarapillai Pararajasingam.

== Motto, Vision and Mission ==
=== Motto ===
For God and Country

=== Vision ===
To develop good citizens with social adaptability multi disciplinary abilities.

=== Mission ===
Organising resources and opportunities effectively to attain optional dedicate stage in physical, mental, social and spiritual activities of students.

== Principals ==
Year	Name
2024 - date	Mr.T.Thileepkumar (Acting Principal)
2020 - 2024	Mr.S.Ilango
2018 – 2020	Mr.S.Indrakumar (Acting Principal)
2015 – 2018	Mr.S.Indrabala (Acting Principal)
2005 – 2015	Mr.S.Sivaneswaran
2004 – 2005	Mr.K.Jeganathan (Acting Principal)
1998 – 2003	Mr.K.Shanmuganathan
1989 – 1998	Late Mr.C.Kesavarajan
1983 – 1989	Late Mr.S.V.Mahesavelu
1983	Late Mr.V.Suntharalingam (Acting Principal)
1979 – 1983	Late Mr.S.T.Chari
1972 – 1979	Late Mr.S.Perairavar
1956 – 1972	Late Mr.K.Muttuvetpillai
1952 – 1955	Late Mr.C.Navaratnam
1922 – 1952	Late Mr.Veerasingham
1921 – 1922	Late Mr.S.Mayilvakanam (Swami Vipulanndar)
1920 – 1921	Late Mr.S.Sivapathasundaram (Acting Principal)
1917 – 1920	Late Mr.T.H.Crossette
1915 – 1917	Late Mr.T.P.Hudson
1914 – 1915	Late Mr.M.Sabaratnasinghe (Acting Principal)
1913 – 1914	Late Mr.G.Shiva Rao
1911 – 1913	Late Mr.P.Sabapathipillai
1910 – 1911	Late Mr.S.Veerasamipillai

== Houses ==
The students are divided among four houses named Sambandar, Sundarar, Manikkar and Vakeesar.

House Name	Colour
Sundarar	🟩 Green
Sambandar	🟥 Red
Manikkar	🟦 Blue
Vakeesar	🟨 Yellow

The houses are named from the four foremost Nayanars (or Nayanmars) of Tamil Hindu saints.

An annual sport of athletics among these houses held in the middle of the first term.

== Old Students Association (OSA) ==
Manipay Hindu College Old Students Association (OSA) was formed in 1917. The main purpose of the OSA was to keep former pupils in touch with each other and the school.

In 1980, Manipay Hindu College OSA was registered as approved charity under section 31 (9) of Island Revenue Act. (Gazette No 80 of 14/03/1980)

Manipay Hindu College, OSA has branches in Colombo, London, Toronto, Montreal, Sydney and Melbourne.

See also

- Category:People associated with Manipay Hindu College
- List of schools in Northern Province, Sri Lanka
