= Alexander Francis Molamure =

Ceylonese politician

Hon. Sir Alexander Francis Molamure KBE
- A. F. Molamure as Speaker of the State Council

1st Speaker of the State Council
- In office 7 July 1931 – 10 December 1934
- Succeeded by: Forester Augustus Obeysekera

1st Speaker of the Parliament of Ceylon
- In office 14 October 1947 – 25 January 1951
- Prime Minister: D. S. Senanayake
- Preceded by: Waithilingam Duraiswamy
- Succeeded by: Albert Peries

Member of the Ceylon Parliament for Balangoda
- In office 14 October 1947 – 25 January 1951
- Preceded by: Constituency created
- Succeeded by: Jayaweera Kuruppu

Personal details
- Born: 2 July 1888
- Died: 25 February 1951 (aged 62)
- Party: United National Party
- Spouse: Adeline Meedeniya
- Children: Seetha Molamure
- Education: S. Thomas' College
- Profession: Advocate
- Awards: Knight Commander of the Most Excellent Order of the British Empire

Sir Alexander Francis Molamure, KBE (7 February 1888 – 25 January 1951; commonly known as Sir Francis Molamure or A. F. Molamure) was a Ceylonese politician. He became the first speaker of both the State Council of Ceylon and Parliament of Ceylon. He was a controversial figure due to his departure from the State Council due to a court conviction and for organising the Panamure Elephant Kraal in 1950.

== Early life ==
Born in Ratnapura on 2 July 1888, he was educated at S. Thomas' College, Mount Lavinia where he played cricket for his school team, captaining the college team at the Royal–Thomian in 1903.

== Legal career ==
He qualified as a barrister and became an advocate, establishing his practice in the unofficial bar in Kegalle.

== Early political career ==
Molamure was a member of the local board for health and improvement in Kegalle. He contested the 1924 legislative council election and was elected to the Legislative Council of Ceylon from the Kegalle District. In the legislative council he was a member of the committee on higher education that was appointed by the Governor which recommended the formation of the University of Ceylon.

In 1927, he chaired the 9th AGM of the All Ceylon Buddhist Association Congress. In 1931, he was re-elected to the First State Council from the Dedigama electorate. The State Council was ceremonially opened on 10 July 1931, and Molamure was elected as the speaker three days earlier on 7 July having defeated Sir Stewart Schneider by 35 to 18 votes.

== Maduwanwela estate ==
Molamure was the nephew of J. W. Maduwanwela (who was known as Maduwanwela Maha Disawe) who had included him in his last will as executor, indicating that his widow and daughter and Molamure's cousin, Dingiri Appey retain life interest over much of his vast properties and ownership to pass to Molamure on their deaths and held in trust until such time. The trust included the Maduwanwela Walawwa, 83,000 acres of timber and gem lands and a vast fortune of gems, jewellery and properties. Upon his uncle's death, Molamure and another trustee a nephew of Kalawana Kumarihami, Cyril Dangamuwa William Theodore Ellawala, the Rate Mahatmaya of the Nawadun Korale in Ratnapura, were able to successfully manipulate the trust left for Dingiri Appey, who was crippled at birth, to their benefit. The wealth from this Maduwanwela trust provided Molamure with the resources to launch an ambitious political career. In 1934, he was found guilty of contempt of court by the district court of Ratnapura for overdrawing funds in the Imperial Bank of India of the Maduwanwela estate in 1931 while he was the executor, a ruling which was confirmed by the supreme court in February 1935, resulting in a 12-month prison sentence. This resulted in Molamure losing his post as speaker and his seat in the state council on 10 December 1934 after an absence of three months without leave.

== Return to politics ==
After an absence from politics, during which time he had acquired a number of tea and rubber estates, Molamure had become a prominent member of the Ceylon National Congress and a close ally of D. S. Senanayake by the early 1940s. He was elected to the State Council in October 1943 from Balangoda in a by-election after the resignation of H. A. Goonesekera over a charge of bribery. He contested the 1947 general election from the Balangoda electorate representing the United National Party and was elected to the newly formed Parliament of Ceylon. At the first seating of parliament of the newly independent Ceylon, Molamure's name was proposed as speaker by C. Sittampalam and S. U. Edirimanasingham when the opposition proposed Herbert Sri Nissanka. In the following vote, Molamure gained 58 and Sri Nissanka gained 41. Thereby Molamure became the first speaker of parliament and had the government purchase Mumtaz Mahal, Colombo as the official residence of the speaker. He was appointed a Knight Commander of the Most Excellent Order of the British Empire in the 1949 Birthday Honours and was known as Sir Francis Molamure.

== Elephant Kraal ==
As his uncle, the Maduwanwela Maha Disawe before him, Molamure continued to organise the Elephant Kraal in Panamure, which had been started by the Maduwanwela Maha Disawe in 1896. Molamure was the chief organiser of the last Elephant Kraal at Panamure in 1950, which led to much controversy following the killing of the bull elephant who tried to break the Kraal blockade. The incident led to public outcry and debates in parliament resulting in a ban on both the kraals and the capture of wild elephants.

== Family ==
Molamure married Adeline Meedeniya in 1912, who became the first female member of the State Council in 1931. She was the daughter of J. H. Meedeniya Adigar, member of the Legislative Council and Corneliya Senanayake who was the nephew of Lambertus Obeyesekere, Maha Mudaliyar. His brother-in-law was press baron D. R. Wijewardena and thereby his grand nephew Ranil Wickremesinghe would later become the President of Sri Lanka.

Their only daughter, Seetha Molamure, became a member of the Senate of Ceylon. She married L. J. Seneviratne, a civil servant who became the Secretary of the Treasury.

== Death ==
Molamure suffered a stroke while presiding over parliament at the speaker's seat and was taken to the General Hospital in an unconscious state. He died in hospital a day later, on 25 January 1951.

== See also ==
- List of political families in Sri Lanka
