= S. Pararajasingam =

Ceylon Tamil landed proprietor (born 1896)

Sir S. Pararajasingam

Member of the Senate of Ceylon

Personal details
- Born: 25 June 1896
- Education: S. Thomas' College, Mount Lavinia; Wesley College, Colombo
- Ethnicity: Ceylon Tamil

Sir Sangarapillai Pararajasingam was a Ceylonese landed proprietor and member of the Senate of Ceylon.

== Early life and family ==
Pararajasingam was born on 25 June 1896. He was the son of A. V. Sangarapillai, founder of Manipay Hindu College. Pararajasingam was educated at S. Thomas' College, Mount Lavinia and Wesley College, Colombo.

Pararajasingam married Pathmavathy, daughter of Sir Ponnambalam Arunachalam.

== Career ==
Pararajasingam worked as a broker for Messrs Volkart Brothers. He was chairman of the Low Country Producers Association and on the Board of Directors of the Agricultural and Industrial Credit Corporations, Ceylon Coconut Board and Ceylon Institute of Scientific and Industrial Research.

Pararajasingam was president of the Ceylon Poultry Club and Colombo Rotary Club.

== Later life ==
Pararajasingam was appointed to the Senate of Ceylon in 1954. In the 1955 Birthday Honours, he was knighted for services to agriculture.
