= A. Ponnambalam =

Ceylonese colonial-era government functionary, businessman and philanthropist

Gate Mudaliyar A. Ponnambalam JP
- Born: 1814; Manipay, Ceylon
- Died: 4 September 1887
- Children: P. Arunchalam, P. Coomaraswamy, P. Ramanathan

Gate Mudaliyar Arunachalam Ponnambalam, JP, UM (1814 – 4 September 1887) was a Ceylonese colonial-era government functionary, businessman and philanthropist. He was the cashier at the Colombo Kachcheri and was appointed to the titular rank of Gate Mudaliyar.

== Early life and family ==
Ponnambalam was born in 1814 in Manipay in northern Ceylon. He was the son of Arunachalam and Thangam. Through his paternal line Ponnambalam is believed to be a descendant of Mana Mudaliyar of Thondai Nadu, one of the pioneer settlers of Jaffna Peninsula in the late 15th century.

Ponnambalam's father died when he was an infant and his mother married Ariyaputhira. In 1830, aged 16, Ponnambalam was sent to Colombo to live with Gate Mudaliyar A. Coomaraswamy and his wife Visalachchi. He studied English at the Regimental School.

Ponnambalam married Sellachi Ammai, daughter of Gate Mudaliyar A. Coomaraswamy, on 24 January 1844. They had three sons (P. Coomaraswamy, P. Ramanathan and P. Arunchalam).

== Career ==
Ponnambalam worked as a volunteer at the Colonial Secretary's office but he could not get a paid position in the office. He took up trade but found business to be slow. He took up coffee cultivation but this too did not succeed. A few months after the death of Gate Mudaliyar A. Coomaraswamy, Ponnambalam was appointed landing waiter and searcher at the Customs Department but the fees he had to pay to various public officials meant that he earned little from the job. However, his devotion to duty and integrity were noted by those in power and on 11 May 1845 he was appointed cashier at the Colombo Kachcheri. He became Deputy Coroner for Colombo in February 1847 and two months later he was appointed Mudaliyar of the Governor's Gate. His investiture took place on 9 April 1847 at Queen's House, Colombo. In October 1847 he was appointed justice of the peace for Colombo District, serving as an unofficial magistrate. Governor Torrington appointed Ponnambalam the native revenue assistant to the Government Agent of the Western Province but the Secretary of State refused to confirm the appointment because the law at that time only allowed the Government Agent to collect taxes, not the Assistant Government Agent. A disappointed Ponnambalam left, along with several relatives, left for pilgrimage to India in January 1850, returning to Ceylon in May 1850.

Ponnambalam started losing interest in his work in 1851, and after his wife died in September 1854, he resigned from his position as cashier at the Colombo Kachcheri on 30 November 1854. His three young sons were brought up his mother-in-law Visalachchi. He became a merchant, importing and exporting goods but, not having the callousness needed to succeed in business, failed.

In his later years Ponnambalam immersed himself in religious devotion. Influenced by his Hindu pilgrimage to South India, Ponnambalam started building a Sivan temple in Colombo, the Sri Ponnambala Vaneswara Temple at Sea Street in Kochchikade, in 1856. The temple was consecrated on 12 November 1857. Soon after he fell ill and took seven years to recover.

In his old age Ponnambalam devoted more and more of his time to running of the temple, to the detriment of his own health. In 1879 he suffered a stroke but recovered and continued with his temple duties. He suffered a second stroke which disabled him. His eldest son Coomaraswamy took over caring for him and Ponnambalam recovered a little. He died on 4 September 1887.

== Sources ==
- Muttucumaraswamy, V. (1973). Founders of Modern Ceylon. Uma Siva Pathippakam.
- Vythilingam, M. (1971). The Life of Sir Ponnambalam Ramanathan 1.
