= Rate Mahatmaya =

A group of British appointed Kandyan chiefs, with Hon. J. P. Lewis, Government Agent in 1905. The chiefs have adopted the dress of traditional Dissawas by this time but still haven't started using other traditional insignia of high office such as jewelry, ceremonial daggers or footwear.

Rate Mahatmaya was a traditional office and title from the Kingdom of Kandy which became part of the British colonial administration within the Kandyan and central region of Ceylon.

== History ==
Persons were appointed to the title and office by the King during the Kingdom of Kandy, these appointees headed the administration of a large locality known as Korale, which was a division of the province of the Kingdom known as a Dissava and as such he would be subordinate to the local Dissava. There was no time limit for the officer holder as he held the post at the pleasure of the King, which meant throughout his life, if not incurred the displeasure of the King. It was not hereditary, although members of the same family have been appointed. They were members of the Radala Cast, who were referred to as the Chieftains of Kandy by the British. Many were instrumental in the surrender of the Kandyan Kingdom to the British.

Following the expansion of British rule into the provinces of the former Kandyan Kingdom in 1815, the British retained the office of Rate Mahatmaya appointing Kandyans loyal to the British Crown. Following the Uva Rebellion in 1818 and changers to the administrative divisions of the island with the creation of Districts, British Government Agents (GA) took over the duties of the Dissava, with Rate Mahatmaya becoming a subordinate to the local Government Agents and Assistant Government Agents. During the British administration a Rate Mahatmaya would head a revenue district, a Korale and would be the Kandyan equivalent to a Mudaliyar in the lower country or the coastal regions. New appointments were stopped in the 1931 after the abolition of the native department, while current holders retained their posts until their retirement while transferable District Revenue Officers were appointed as replacements. The last Rate Mahatmaya retired in the late 1950s.

== Notable appointees ==
- Punchi Banda Nugawela Dissava - Rate Mahatmaya of Sarasiyapattuwa
- Barnes Ratwatte Dissava, successor of S.D.N Mhawalatenne - Rate Mahatmaya of Balangoda
- William Ellawala - Rate Mahatmaya
- S. N. W. Hulugalle - Rate Mahatmaya
- Maduwanwela Maha Disawe
- P. B. Elangasinha - co-creator of the Sri Lanka Matha

== See also ==
- Native headmen of Ceylon
- Walauwa
- Sri Lankan titles
- Sri Lankan honours system
