= Balangoda =

Balangoda බළන්ගොඩ பலாங்கொடை
- Town
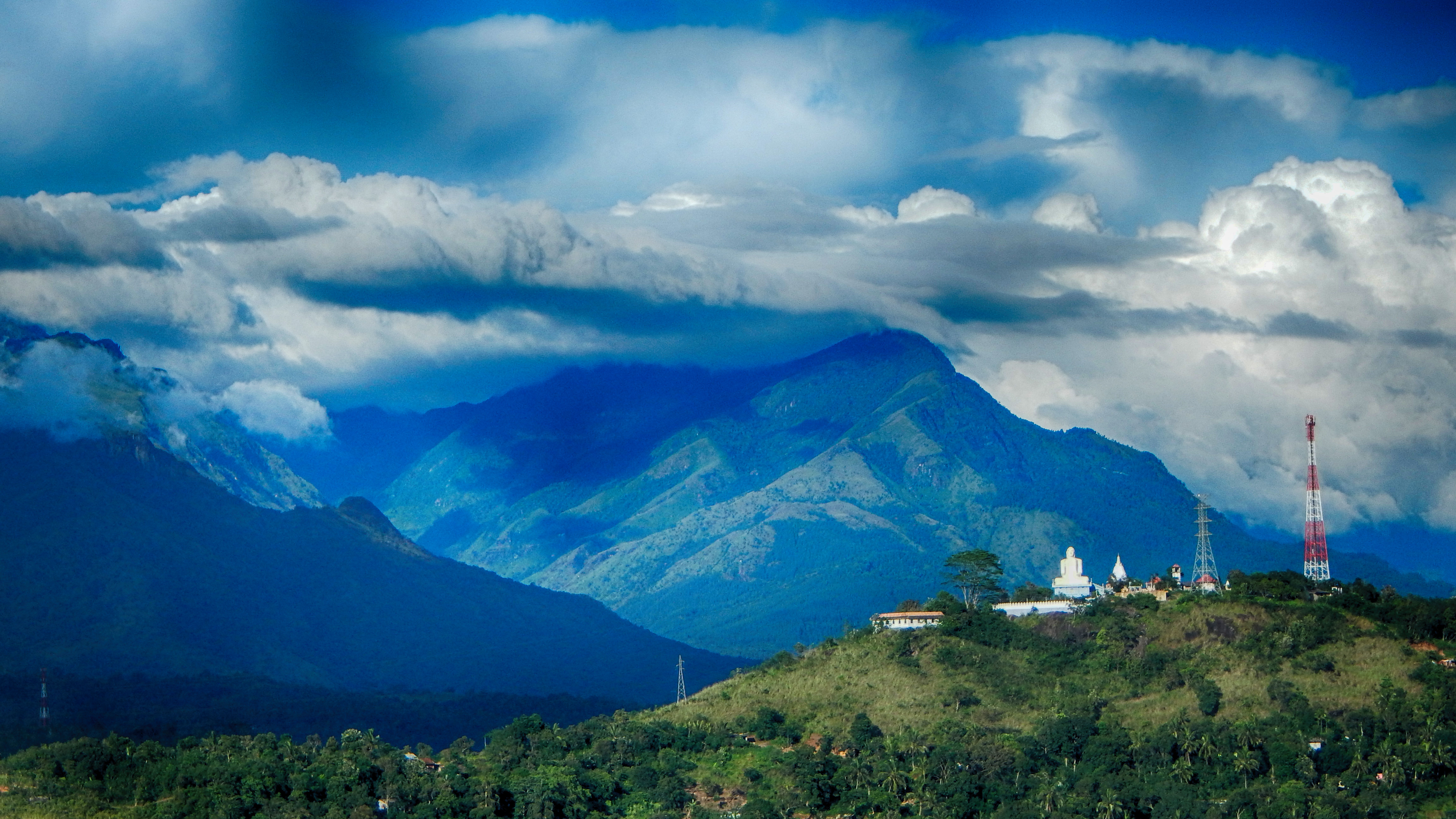

- Location in Sri Lanka
- Coordinates: 6°39′N 80°41′E
- Country: Sri Lanka
- Province: Sabaragamuwa
- District: Ratnapura

Area
  - Total: 16.2 km^{2} (6.3 sq mi)

Population (2024)
  - Total: 74,893
  - Density: 4,620/km^{2} (12,000/sq mi)
- Time zone: +5.30

Balangoda is a town in Ratnapura District, Sabaragamuwa Province, Sri Lanka. The town is associated with Balangoda Man, a prehistoric Hominini population from the late Quaternary period identified through archaeological evidence from the region. According to the 2024 census, the town had a population of 74,893.

== History ==
Balangoda is associated with Balangoda Man, a prehistoric Hominini population from the late Quaternary period identified through skeletal remains and tools from several cave sites in the region. Archaeological evidence has indicated the presence of anatomically modern humans from approximately 34,000 BP, who were mostly hunter-gatherers. The region seems to have been continually occupied since then, and the skeletal features suggest a biological continuity with the modern population in Sri Lanka.

Kaltota near Balangoda was a major urban center in the Sabaragamuwa region since the second century BCE. Archeological finds have unearthed remnants of old furnaces used for smelting of iron ore, which was used to produce steel for making swords. Balangonda remained a major urban center till the fifteenth century CE, after which the population declined.

During the British colonial era, it was covered with vegetation and was sparsely populated. The British established tea estates in the region, and the local population was involved in rice cultivation and collection of forest produce. The Balangoda Urban Council was established in 1939 with Barnes Ratwatte as its first chairman. The town is also the birthplace of the Buddhist monk Balangoda Ananda Maitreya Thero, and Sirimavo Bandaranaike, the first female Prime Minister of Sri Lanka.

== Geography ==
Balangoda is situated in Ratnapura District, in the Sabaragamuwa Province of Sri Lanka. The town lies on the northern boundary of the Walawe River basin. The municipality covers an area of approximately 16.2 km^{2} (6.3 sq mi).

== Demographics ==
According to the 2024 census, Balangoda had a population of 74,893, comprising 36,403 males and 38,490 females. Sinhalese (74.4%) formed the majority with Sri Lankan Tamils (13.4%), Sri Lankan Moors (8.9%) and Indian Tamils (3.1%) contributing the remaining population. Buddhism is the major religion with 73.4% of the population adhering to it, followed by Hinduism (14.6%) and Islam (9%).

== Education ==
St. Agnes Balika Maha Vidyalaya, a primary and secondary girls' school, was established in 1930.
