= Eksath Bhikkhu Peramuna =

Sinhalese Buddhist organization (1956–1959)

The Eksath Bhikkhu Peramuna (lit. 'United Monks Front') was an umbrella organization consisting of two associations of Buddhist monks founded in 1956 in the Dominion of Ceylon (today Sri Lanka) to promote Sinhalese Buddhist interests in politics. It campaigned against the United National Party (UNP) and helped to bring the Mahajana Eksath Peramuna to power in the 1956 general election. It became defunct following the assassination of Prime Minister S. W. R. D. Bandaranaike.

== Background ==
In preparations for the Buddha Jayanti celebrations marking the 2,500th anniversary of the Buddha's death set to begin in May 1956, various Buddhist associations were formed in the early 1950s to restore Buddhism to what they thought was its rightful place on the island. Due to the efforts of a handful of Buddhist civil servants, teachers and lawyers, disparate associations of Buddhist monks from all three sects were brought together to form the Sri Lanka Maha Sangha Sabha in 1953, which became an important interest group articulating Buddhist grievances.

The All-Ceylon Buddhist Congress (ACBC), which in 1954 had set up a Buddhist Committee of Inquiry into the status of Buddhism on the island, outlined the wider Buddhist grievances in its February 1956 report, whose abridged English version was titled "The Betrayal of Buddhism". The report, which came to be popularly known as the Buddhist Commission Report, blamed the centuries of European colonialism which privileged Christianity for the decline of Buddhism on the island, and deplored the continued dominance Christian religious bodies incorporated by law enjoyed under the UNP government and the disproportionate Christian control of educational institutions. Among its recommendations were that a Buddhist Sasana Council should be established and be "entrusted all the prerogatives of the Buddhist kings" to foster Buddhism, and that government grants to Christian schools should be withdrawn.

== Formation ==
Shortly after the Buddhist Commission Report was published and for the purpose of the 1956 general election itself, two associations of Buddhists monks, the Sri Lanka Maha Sangha Sabha (SLMSS) and the All-Ceylon Bhikkhu Congress, came together to form the Eksath Bhikkhu Peramuna (EBP) on 4 February 1956. The EBP was led by its most prominent and powerful leader, the Buddhist prelate Mapitigama Buddharakkitha, who along with Talpawila Seelawansa were also its joint secretaries. Buddharakkitha and Seelawansa were also the joint secretaries of the All-Ceylon Bhikkhu Congress. Other leaders of the EBP were Buddhist monks Baddegama Wimalawansa, Henpitagedera Gnanaseeha, Talduwe Somarama and Kotahene Pagnakitthi. Most members of the EBP, including its leadership, came from the Amarapura and Ramanya sects, although Buddharakkitha himself was from the Siam sect. The EBP had over 75 regional bodies and claimed a membership of about 12,000 Buddhist clergy.

L. H. Mettananda, an influential member of the ACBC's Buddhist Committee of Inquiry, was partly responsible for the EBP's formation. Mettananda, known for his anti-Catholic views, had organized the SLMSS in his campaigns against the UNP government which he accused of discriminating against Buddhists and of favouring Catholics. N. Q. Dias, a nationalist civil servant who had been working to overthrow the Westernized cultural ethos represented by the UNP elite, was described as "the ideologue and the real driving force and architect of the EBP". Dias in collaboration with Mettananda had established associations of monks called sangha sabhas, numbering 72 by 1954, which came to form the SLMSS. According to Walpola Rahula Thero, the ulterior motive behind Dias' Buddhist activism was "to establish a true Sinhala Buddhist government in Sri Lanka in the Buddha Jayanthi year" of 1956.

== 1956 general election ==
On 16 February 1956, the EBP led by Buddharakkitha held a meeting at the Town Hall in Colombo, urging the UNP government to postpone the election from early 1956 to after the Buddha Jayanti celebrations which were set to take place between May 1956 and May 1957. Convinced that they might not be able to make the government change its decision, Buddharakkitha declared that they should work for the defeat of the UNP at the election. Under the slogan "No election before the Buddha Jayanti", about 250 Buddhist monks protested against the government by staging a hunger strike on the steps of the House of Representatives. Denouncing the elections as Māra (Satan) from whom Buddhism must be protected, the monks staged satyagraha demonstrations throughout the country.

In the next phase, the EBP now openly campaigned against the UNP and in support of the electoral coalition Mahajana Eksath Peramuna (MEP) led by S.W.R.D Bandaranaike. On 3 March 1956, in a meeting attended by over 3,000 monks from all over the island, the EBP presented the Dasa Panatha (Ten Principles) outlining the objectives for the future government. Among the principles listed were implementing the proposals of the Buddhist Commission Report, making Sinhala the only official language, and removing the policies and institutions of the UNP government. MEP politicians who attended the meeting, including its leader Bandaranaike, accepted the proposal while kneeling before the monks. The MEP manifesto approved the recommendations of the Buddhist Commission Report, which became the foundation of its campaign.

Buddharakkitha, who had been a founder member and patron of Bandaranaike's Sri Lanka Freedom Party (SLFP) formed in 1951, was largely responsible for organizing the monks' election campaign and the wealthy monk also made lavish financial contribution to the MEP's election fund. Between 3,000 and 4,000 monks participated as campaign workers, making house-to-house visits, distributing pamphlets and addressing meetings.

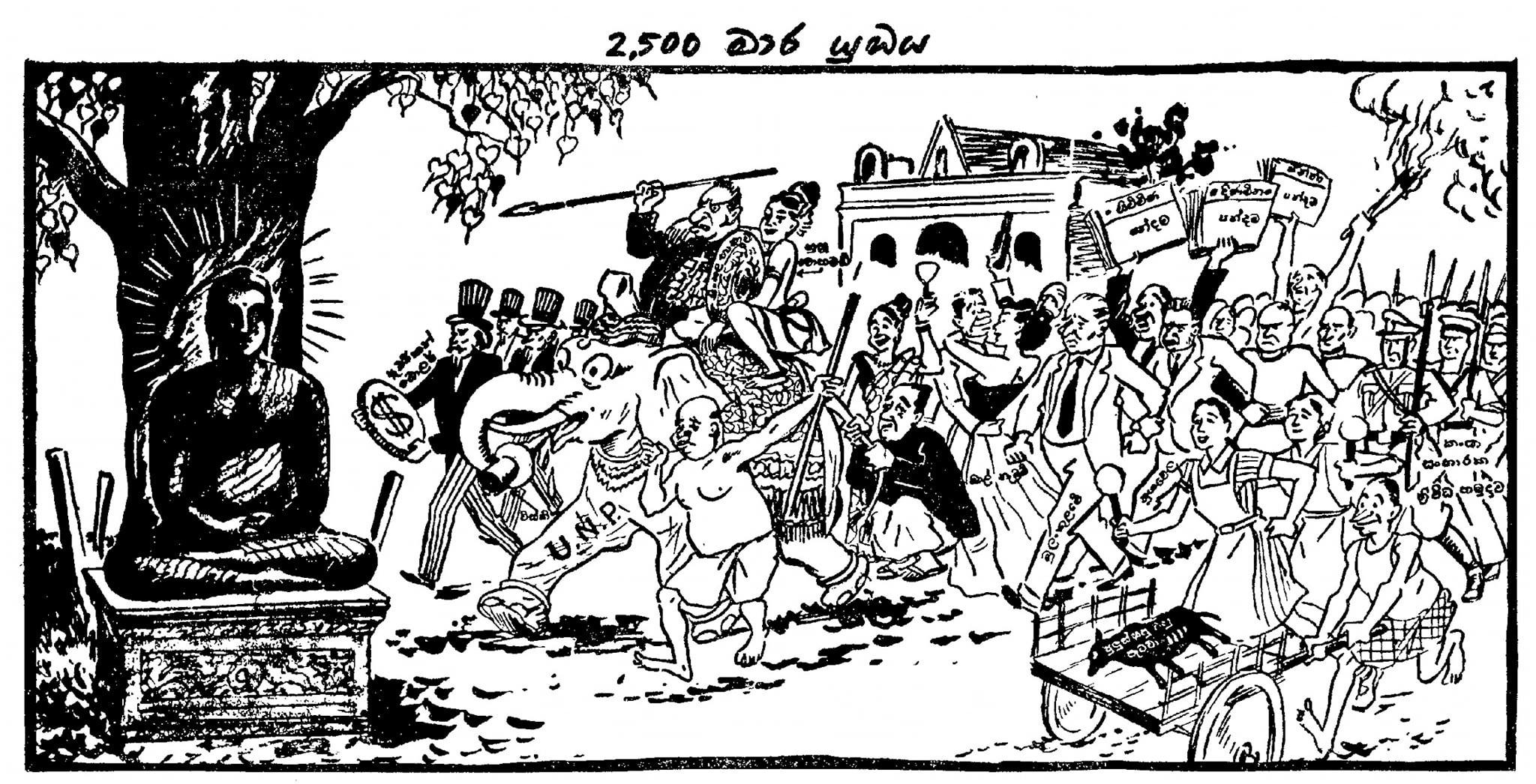
An anti-UNP poster titled "Mara Yuddhaya" (The struggle with Satan) published by the EBP in 1956

The EBP's national campaign against the UNP was centered around the arguments that it privileged Christians at the expense of Buddhists; its leaders having been brought up in Christian schools were immersed in Christian culture and were ignorant of the island's Buddhist history; and that the UNP sold the country to the United States and was being helped by Christian Americans to achieve their foreign policy objectives. The EBP campaigned under slogans such as, "A vote for the UNP is a vote for the Catholics; a vote for the MEP is a vote for the Buddhists." The Buddhist campaign came to be epitomized by the EBP's effective anti-UNP poster titled "Mara Yudhaya" (The Struggle with Satan). The poster depicted the UNP leader Sir John Kotelawala and the accompanying figures representing Western culture, capitalists, Uncle Sams, Catholic priests and the Catholic-dominated armed forces as hordes of Māra (Satan) descending upon a Buddha statue, with a caption calling on the people to "rescue your country, your race and your religion from the forces of evil."

The EBP proved to be an "indispensable political ally" and "the most powerful engine" of support of the MEP. The campaign finally paid off on 10 April when the elections resulted in a surprising landslide victory for the MEP which secured an absolute majority, bringing an end to the eight-year rule of the UNP government. The EBP contributed significantly to this result. Soon after the swearing-in, the new Prime Minister Bandaranaike and members of his cabinet visited the Kelaniya Raja Maha Vihara to pay homage to its Chief Incumbent, Buddharakkitha.

== EBP's role in the MEP government ==
As political debts for its powerful and effective support, the EBP enjoyed considerable clout in the new government. Buddharakkitha was a vice-president of the ruling SLFP and he along with his colleague Seelawansa were also members of the Party's Central Executive Committee. Buddharakkitha was described as "the power behind the throne". Assuming the role of a "supra-cabinet", the EBP was able to appoint its favoured candidates to cabinet posts and was consulted on policy decisions. As part of his election promise to implement the recommendations of the Buddhist Commission Report, Bandaranaike established a Ministry of Cultural Affairs to "rehabilitate the religions which have suffered under colonial rule." N. Q. Dias, the strategist behind the EBP, became its first Director.

== Anti-Tamil campaign ==
=== Sinhala Only Act ===
Shortly after the elections, the EBP chastised the Leftist parties in the coalition for not supporting the government in its policy of making Sinhala as the sole official language. The EBP also became frustrated with the government's slow progress on the language issue and demanded the government should expedite the necessary legislation to fulfill its election promise of "Sinhalese only in twenty-four hours". The EBP, therefore, became "one of the most articulate single interest groups working to make Sinhalese the only state language." As its first legislation since assuming office, the Bandaranaike government introduced a draft bill to make Sinhala the sole official language but with provisions ensuring the use of Tamil. The strongest opposition to these provisions came from the political monks connected to the EBP and the Sinhala Jatika Sangamay (SJS), a Sinhalese Buddhist pressure group most of whose members worked in the EBP during the elections. Their rally on the steps of the House of Representatives ended in a hunger strike by a prominent university lecturer. Due to these protests, the bill without the Tamil provisions was introduced in the Parliament on 5 June 1956.

While the Sinhala Only Act, as the bill came to be known, was being debated in the Parliament, the Tamil Federal Party staged a satyagraha protest outside the parliament building, which was met with a counter-protest by the EBP. The Tamil protesters were attacked by a Sinhalese mob representing the EBP, leading to anti-Tamil riots in other parts of the island in which nearly 150 Tamils were killed.

When an agreement promising concessions to Tamils was reached between Bandaranaike and the leader of the Federal Party resulting in the Bandaranaike-Chelvanayakam Pact toward the end of July 1957, the EBP, SJS and other Sinhalese Buddhist nationalist groups accused the Prime Minister of having "sold the rights and heritage of the Sinhalese to the Tamils," and threatened to conduct their own satyagraha campaign unless the agreement was abrogated.

In the early 1958, Tamils led by the Federal Party engaged in "anti-Sri" campaigns in the Tamil areas in protest of the government's decision to add the Sinhala letter Sri on the license plates of all the vehicles throughout the island, which had been done by the Ministry of Transport at the request of the SJS. The EBP threatened the government that it would take "direct action" if it refused to take immediate steps to stop the Tamil campaign in the northern province. On 1 April, Buddhist monks of the All-Ceylon United Bhikkhu Association led a retaliatory pro-Sri campaign, effacing Tamil and English signs. On 9 April, about 250 Buddhist monks under the direction of Buddharakkitha staged a mass sit-down demonstration in front of Bandaranaike's residence, demanding the abrogation of his pact with the Federal Party, to which he eventually acceded by tearing up a copy of the pact while the monks "clapped in joy".

=== 1958 anti-Tamil riots ===
Later in the same month, the EBP declared that it would organize a "boycott week" from 10 to 17 May and urged the Sinhalese to avoid transactions with the Tamils as a protest against the activities of the Federal Party. During this period, anti-Tamil leaflets were distributed, warning Tamils to stop the activities of the Federal Party and calling on the Sinhalese to boycott the Tamils.

On 23 May, another series of anti-Tamil riots broke out, killing hundreds by 27 May when a state of emergency was declared. Soon after the riots, the leaders of the Federal Party were placed under house arrest and the Party itself was temporarily banned. The EBP leader Buddharakkitha made an inflammatory speech over the radio in which he announced that the EBP had decided to temporarily stop its boycott campaign since a part of their objective had been achieved with the ban of the Federal Party.

During the parliamentary debates in the aftermath of the riots, several members of parliament denounced the activities of the EBP as having contributed to the violence. Dr. N. M. Perera, Leader of the Opposition, noted that the EBP through its inflammatory speeches during its boycott campaign created an atmosphere to "rouse up the basest passions of the people." Likewise, Senator S. Nadesan called the government out on not having condemned the boycott campaign organized by one of its prime supporters, the EBP, which he named as among the groups that had contributed to the intensification of racialized propaganda during the last two months. J. C. T. Kotelawala, MP for Badulla, accused the "yellow-robed Rasputins" in the government, such as the EBP leaders Buddharakkitha and Seelawansa, for having roused the people with racial hatred over the language issue since 1956. He also accused Seelawansa of having distributed an anti-Tamil notice which called on "Aryan Sinhalese" to defy and exterminate the Tamil enemy. C. A. Dharmapala, MP for Hakmana, placed the blame for the violence on the government from whose platforms, he attested to having personally witnessed, the seed of racial hatred that was spread and sponsored by the EBP.

Thus, the EBP came to embody Sinhalese Buddhist intransigence and whose threats and demonstrations directed against concessions to minorities "contributed significantly to the growth of communal tensions" after the 1956 general election.

== Anti-Marxist activity ==
In early 1958, Buddharakhitha became embroiled in a conflict with the MEP government's left-wing minister of agriculture, Philip Gunawardena, who had called for the nationalization of foreign-owned tea estates, insurance companies, and banks. Gunawardena had organized strikes and accused the monk of organizing an illegal demonstration and possessing a gun. Buddharakkita then sent two open letters to Bandaranaike where he expressed his concern about "reactionary totalitarians" in the government and attacked Gunawardena's five-point plan to address the high cost of living. Later in the year, the EBP passed a resolution urging Bandaranaike to either stop Gunawardena's strikes, on which they blamed an ongoing economic crisis, or resign.

In early 1959, Buddharakkitha managed to steer the SLFP against Bandaranaike's opinion when the party was fracturing on political lines. While the party general secretary, Nimal Karunatilake, presumably speaking on Bandaranaike's behalf, suggested that the SLFP enter a no-contest agreement with the left-wing parties in the upcoming Colombo municipal elections, Education Minister Wijayananda Dahanayake and two EBP monks opposed this. For the first time, Bandaranaike was unable to persuade the right-wingers of the SLFP to enter a truce with leftists, and Buddharakkitha was thought to be a chief voice in invigorating the SLFP right. Buddharakkitha also urged the party to have an anti-Marxist general secretary and successfully nominated J. C. W. Munasinha to be Karunetilleke's successor despite Bandaranaike's opposition to the promotion.

== Dissolution ==
The internal dissensions within the EBP had led to virtually all of its SLMSS members being alienated by the mid-1958 and some monks also broke away to form their own organization in May over the Buddharakkitha faction's opposition to socialist measures, contributing to its disintegration. A rift had also grown between Buddharakkitha and Bandaranaike which by the mid-1959 became complete. Buddharakkitha was outraged by the Prime Minister's refusal to grant a contract to the monk's shipping company, to allow him a major role in policy-making in the government and, worst of all, to suppress the publications of his sexual affair with the widowed Health Minister Vimala Wijewardene. Feeling increasingly slighted by the government, the EBP finally made its break with the SLFP openly known in early June 1959 when it decided to appoint a committee to investigate whether it might be necessary to start a new political party.

On 25 September 1959, Prime Minister Bandaranaike was shot by the Buddhist monk Talduwe Somarama, an EBP leader who had been appointed as a lecturer in the Ayurvedic Medical College by Bandaranaike himself. Bandaranaike died the following day. Somarama shouted that he had done it for the "country, race and religion". The chief conspirator was his patron Buddharakkitha, who had instigated Somarama by convincing him that Bandaranaike was betraying the country, race and religion and if this situation was not corrected there would be no place for the Sinhalese people, their religion and their language. Therefore, Bandaranaike had to be killed to save the country, race and religion.

Both Somarama and Buddharakkitha were convicted and sentenced to death. Somarama converted to Christianity weeks before being hanged. Buddharakkitha's sentence was later commuted to life imprisonment and he renounced his monkhood in prison. Following the assassination of the Prime Minister and with the public opinion turned against monks in politics, one of the General Secretaries of the EBP, Seelawansa, announced their decision to refrain from participation in the 1960 elections and the group became defunct.
