= 1958 anti-Tamil pogrom =

First islandwide Sinhalese-Tamil riots in Ceylon

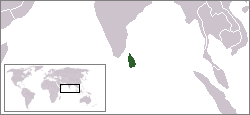
- Location of Ceylon
- Location: Dominion of Ceylon
- Date: May 22 – c. June 2, 1958 (+6 GMT)
- Target: Primarily Tamils, also Sinhalese
- Attack type: Decapitation, burning, stabbing, shooting
- Weapons: Knives, sticks, fire, guns
- Deaths: 158 (official) to 1500
- Injuries: 1,000+
- Perpetrators: Mostly Sinhalese mobs, also Tamil mobs

The first island-wide ethnic riots and pogrom to target the minority Tamils in the Dominion of Ceylon lasted from 22 May until 29 May 1958. The estimates of the murders range, based on recovered bodies, from 158 to 1,500. Although most of the victims were Tamils, Sinhalese and their property were also affected by retaliatory attacks by Tamil mobs throughout the Batticaloa and Jaffna districts. As the first full-scale race riot in the country in over forty years, the events of 1958 shattered the trust the communities had in one another and led to further polarisation.

== Background ==
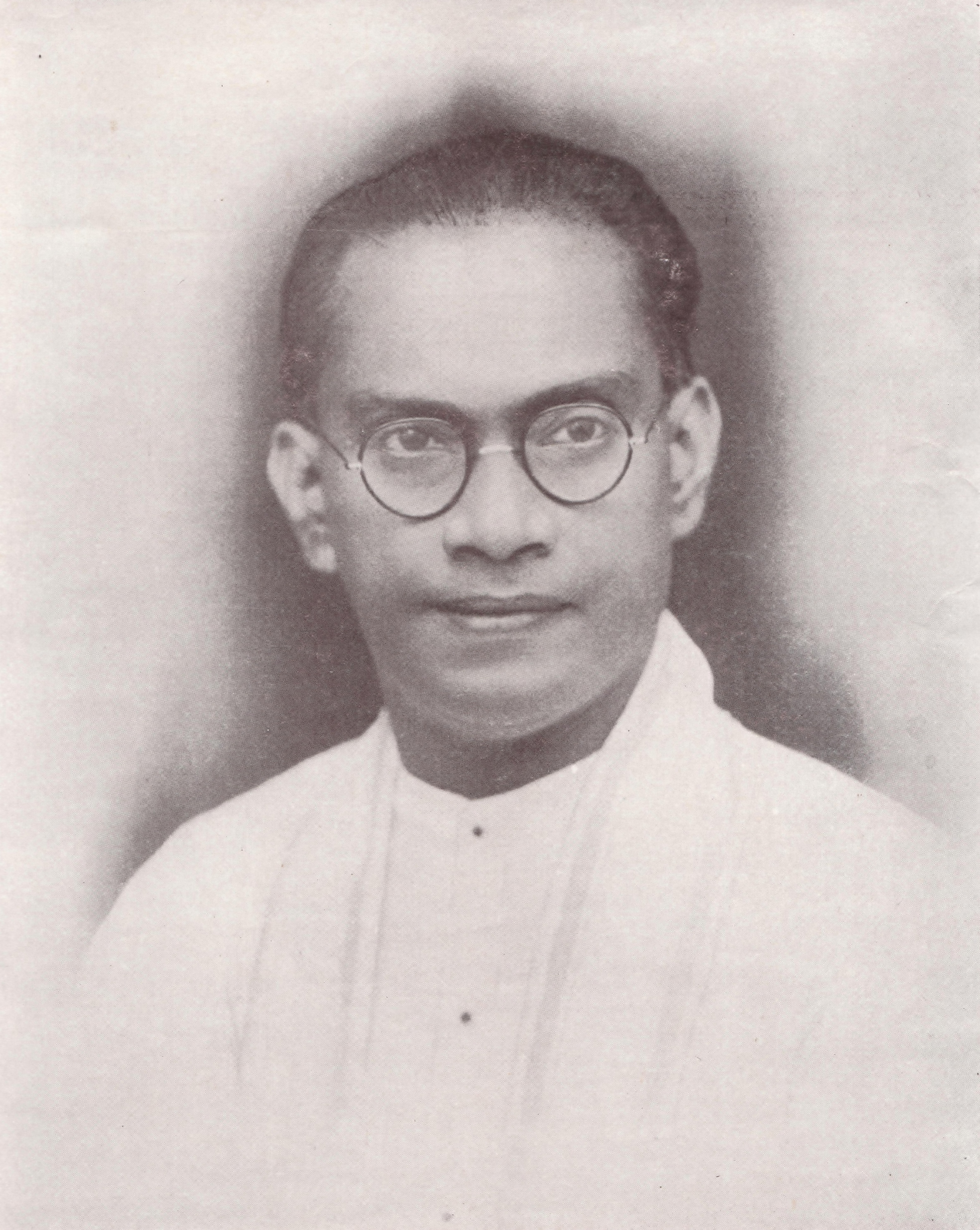
Prime Minister S. W. R. D. Bandaranayaka.

=== Official Language Act (No. 33 of 1956) ===
In 1956, Solomon Bandaranaike led a coalition of leftist parties to a landslide victory in the 1956 general election on a Sinhala nationalist platform and was appointed the third Prime Minister of Ceylon. The new government passed the Official Language Act (No. 33 of 1956) commonly known as the Sinhala Only Act, making Sinhala the sole official language of the country, fulfilling a major election pledge. This was done despite the fact that nearly a quarter of the population used Tamil as their primary language. The act immediately triggered discontent among the Tamils, who perceived their language, culture, and economic position as being subject to an increasing threat.

=== Increased communal tension ===
In protest, Tamil Federal Party politicians launched a satyagraha (Nonviolent resistance) campaign. This led to an environment of increased communal tensions and to the death of over 150 Tamils in the Gal Oya riots in the east of the country. Eventually Bandaranaike entered into negotiations with them and the Federal party and agreed to the Bandaranaike-Chelvanayakam Pact of 1957, which would have made Tamil the administrative language in the Tamil-speaking north and east regions. But he was forced to cancel the pact under pressure from Sinhala nationalists and some Buddhist monks, particularly the United National Party, which organised a 'March on Kandy', led by J. R. Jayawardene.

==== Anti-Sri campaign ====
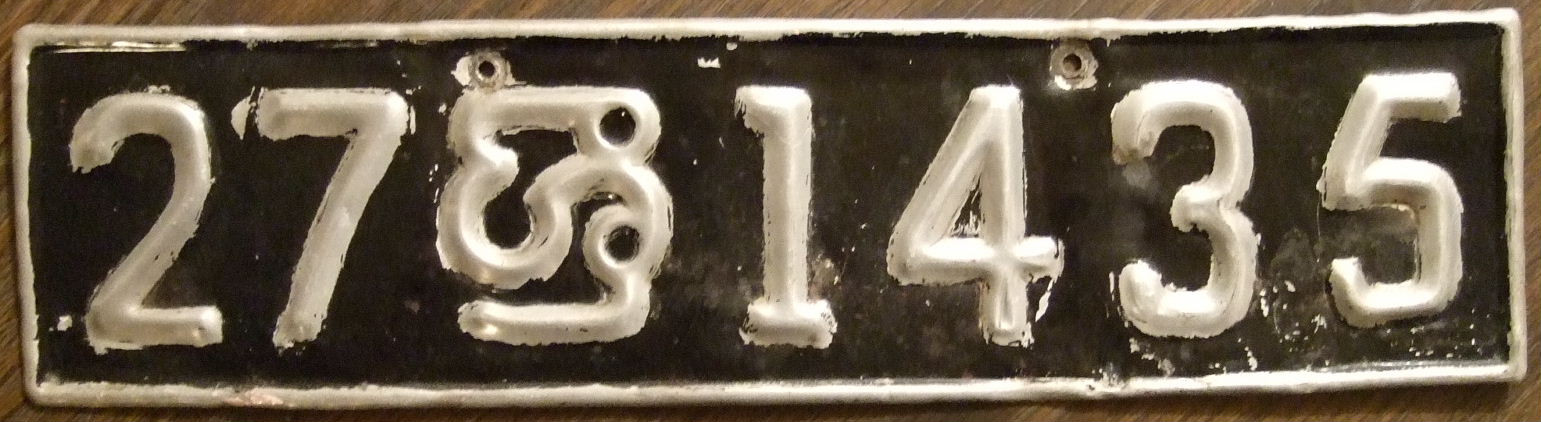
A license plate with the "sri" symbol in the style used between 1956 and 1962.

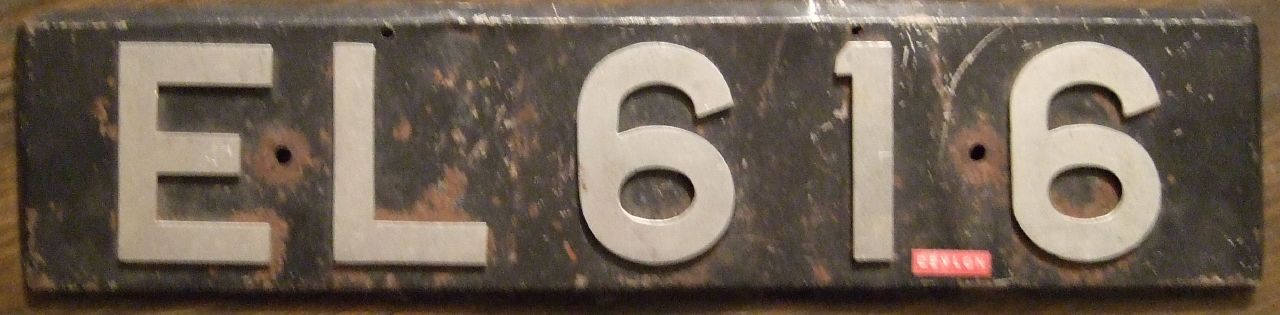
A license plate with the letter prefix "EL" using letters from the name "CEYLON" symbol issued in 1953.

The Sinhala Only policy led to motor vehicles bearing the Sinhala sri character on their license plates. In response, the Federal Party initiated the anti-Sri campaign which involved smearing tar upon the sri characters. This led to a wave of reprisal tarrings of Tamil offices, shops, houses, and even people in the south by Sinhalese gangs as part of a pro-Sri campaign. The anti-Sri campaign also became popular among Indian Tamil youths in the hill country. Minister of Justice M. W. H. de Silva, citing police reports, recounted that in Bogawantalawa on April 2, Indian Tamil campaigners had stoned a bus. The bus driver took the bus to the police station, and the rioters followed. They continued their assault on the bus, and some attacked the police station. The police opened fire, killing two men. The now enraged crowd started attacking Sinhalese property and people. The violence led to Sinhalese reprisals. On the same day, the pro-Sri campaign began in Kahawatte. Two Sinhalese men were stabbed and killed by two Tamil traders there, and Tamil boutiques were burnt in revenge. The next day, a Sinhalese man was stoned to death in the Hatton area. Prime Minister Bandaranaike requested Savumiamoorthy Thondaman, leader of the Ceylon Workers' Congress, to calm down the rioters. Thondaman went to the area and did so successfully.

==== Political influence over the police ====
According to journalist Tarzie Vittachi, since the change of government following the 1956 general election, the ruling coalition politicians began exerting strong influence over the local police which lowered the morale of the police and increased the confidence of the nationalist elements in the supporter base of the ruling coalition. Politicians would enter police stations and demand the release of suspects held for questioning or production before a magistrate. Although the prime minister made a public appeal to the police to give time for the members of his government to get used to their new roles as many were new and immature politicians, the ones who made the most trouble were seasoned politicians.

== Prelude ==
Vavuniya MP C. Suntharalingam recounted that around the same time, 300 Sinhalese laborers of the Land Development and Irrigation Department armed themselves with blades and proceeded to the Tamil village Cheddikulam in trucks. Before they could reach Cheddikulam, an armed group of four Tamils had fired at the gang, and the gang retreated.

Meanwhile, 400 Tamil laborers were laid off when the Royal Navy Dockyard in Trincomalee was closed and transferred to the Government of Ceylon following the request by Prime Minister Bandaranaike in 1956. The government proposed to resettle them in the Polonnaruwa district. This angered the Sinhalese population there. Sinhalese labourers began forming gangs and threatening vigilante attacks on any Tamil migrants to the region.

Following this, M. W. H. de Silva stated that a Sinhalese man was murdered by Tamils in Trincomalee for communal reasons on April 14, leading to tension and a few incidents at Trincomalee, but no prolonged trouble or violence. Soon after, Buddhist organizations began calling for the boycotting of Tamils in Sinhalese areas. Then, in Welimada, the electorate of the ultranationalist K. M. P. Rajaratne, a rally on April 24 resulted in several attacks on Tamil property.

According to G. G. Ponnambalam, member for Jaffna, in the weeks leading up to the riots from April 3 to May 10, Sinhalese groups had published and distributed leaflets which warned Tamils in Colombo to stop the campaign by the Federal Party, otherwise they should be prepared to leave their occupations and go back to Jaffna; and called upon Sinhalese to cut all ties with Tamils and to boycott their businesses. Leslie Goonewardene, MP for Panadura, accused the members of the executive committee of Bandaranaike's SLFP of having attended anti-Tamil boycott meetings where people were also called upon to drive out the Tamils, and blamed the government's pandering to its Sinhalese racialist base for enabling the riots to break out.

Professor Neil DeVotta argued that anti-Tamil climate generated by the Sinhala Only Act was broadly culpable for the riots. The Sinhalese rioters who attacked Tamils felt justified in their actions due to the popular belief about the island as a Sinhalese Buddhist land and the justification of violence by activist Buddhist monks to uphold that status, with Tamils being depicted as posing a threat to it. Sinhalese mobs had been led to believe by Sinhalese politicians that the government would not punish them for anti-Tamil crimes. The Sinhalese colonists had felt their upward mobility threatened by the Federal Party's attempts to stop the colonization schemes. In the south, Sinhalese businessmen had sought to exploit the riots to eliminate Tamil business competition. The UNP had also influenced some rioters with its propaganda that called upon the Sinhalese to kill Tamils.

M. W. H. de Silva further stated that a Sinhalese trader was shot dead by Tamils at Chenkaladi on May 15, causing tension to rise. On May 20, Tamils at Giritale had complained of threats levelled against them. On May 21, C. Rajadurai, MP for Batticaloa, received information that preparations were being undertaken by Sinhalese conspirators to attack the Tamils travelling by train through Polonnaruwa to the Federal Party convention in Vavuniya (due to be held on the 23rd, 24th and 25 May). He alerted the Assistant Superintendent of Police of Batticaloa by letter. The leading conspirators were later confirmed by C. P. de Silva to have been spreading false rumours about the Tamils, and to have also been involved in the previous 1956 anti-Tamil pogrom.

== Pogrom ==
=== Buildup of violence ===
==== 22 May ====
Further information on the preparations being made to attack the Tamils had become apparent to the Federal Party leadership. A large armed crowd of Sinhala labourers (around 500) from the Land Development and Irrigation departments had gathered at Polonnaruwa ready to attack the Tamils. The Police did nothing to stop them and just looked on.

A small incident occurred in Valaichchenai, but as the story reached Polonnaruwa, the story was twisted into a more serious event having occurred. To retaliate, Sinhala hardliners decided to disrupt Tamils travelling to the convention by rail. Polonnaruwa station was the first to be attacked, on 22 May. Most passengers of the train had gotten off earlier due to the threat of violence in Polonnaruwa. One man was found in the train, and the mobs beat him despite his insistence that he was not a Tamil. Another man, Mr. Gnanamuttu, a Tamil notary public was also beaten up.

==== 23 May ====
A night mail train in Batticaloa was derailed, and its passengers, mostly Sinhalese, were attacked. Three people, including Police Sergeant Appuhamy, were killed. Tarzie Vittachi suggests that the derailing was committed by Sinhalese wreckers who made a serious miscalculation, as the passengers were mainly Sinhala and not Tamil. S. J. V. Chelvanayakam argued that it was unlikely that any person with abiding interests in the Batticaloa area would have carried out the derailment, and said that one possible motive for it was to derail a train expected to carry Tamil delegates to the Federal Party convention. However, this is disputed by historian James Manor who suggests that the perpetrators were more likely to be Tamils retaliating for the earlier attack in Polonnaruwa given that the derailment took place in a Tamil-majority area where anti-Sinhalese violence was rising.

==== 24 May ====
Deadly violence in the Polonnaruwa District began on the 24th. Tamils were killed in the open, as well as Sinhalese who protected them. A deaf, mute labourer of unknown ethnicity was also killed. A Sinhala 'Hamudawa' (army) composed of Sinhala labourers from various state departments and farms went on the rampage raping, looting and assaulting Tamils. Sinhalese who were believed to be hiding Tamils "had their brains strewn about". Polonnaruwa had only a small police presence. Requests for reinforcements were not heeded as the Government seemed reluctant to take the situation in the North Central Province seriously. The rioters were tenacious, believing that the police would not shoot at them. The Polonnaruwa station was attacked again on 24 May, and nearly destroyed.

By the evening, there was a well-established pattern of Tamil violence against Sinhalese in and around Eravur. That night, D. A. Seneviratne, former mayor of Nuwara Eliya, was shot dead in his car at Eravur while he was on his way to his estate in Kalkudah, though this was later alleged by some politicians to have been for personal reasons rather than racial ones. S. W. R. D. Banadaranaike claimed that when the police went to the scene to investigate, they found the road blocked and were shot at too. Furthermore, Satchi Ponnambalam suspected that the killing of Seneviratne was then announced over the radio repeatedly to show that Tamils has killed a Sinhalese.

==== 25 May ====
In the morning, a truck and car were fired at near Eravur, the latter incident killing an off-duty Sinhalese police officer and two other Sinhalese.

News of the murder of D. A. Seneviratne spread through the Uva Province, inflaming tension there. There were indications that there would be retaliatory violence against Tamils.

Sinhalese gangs attacked Tamil labourers in Polonnaruwa farms at night. The Tamil labourers in the Polonnaruwa sugar-cane plantation fled when they saw the enemy approaching and hid in the sugar-cane bushes. The Sinhalese mobs however set the sugar cane alight and flushed out the Tamils. As they came out screaming, men, women and children were cut down with home-made swords, grass-cutting knives and katties (a type of cutter), or pulped under heavy clubs. Those who fled were clubbed down or hit by machetes. In Hingurakgoda, rioters ripped open the belly of an eight-month-pregnant woman, and left her to bleed to death. One woman in sheer terror embraced her two children and jumped into a well. Vittachi estimates that 70 people died the night of 25 May, though Manor claims that this is an exaggeration.

==== 26 May ====
Attacks on Tamils continued in the Polonnaruwa District. Two irrigation officers, one Sinhalese Christian and another Tamil, were shot dead at Diyabeduma after being unable to recite a Buddhist verse and, in the former's case, being unable to explain that he was a Sinhalese Christian. Tamil refugees in Polonnaruwa were being guarded at the police station. Throughout the day, Sinhalese mobs from various parts of the Polonnaruwa area converged at the station for a nighttime assault. There was only a small police force to keep the crowd at bay. At around 2 p.m., an army unit of 25 men arrived with a Bren gun to aid the police officers. Fearing that the unit's arrival was a sign of more army units on the way, the 3,000 strong mob decided to attack the station before more security arrived. At around 3:20 pm, the mob started to advance onto the police station. The army fired warning shots, but this only made the mob more confident that the army was bluffing. Polonnaruwa District Government Agent Derryck Aluwihare signed an order permitting the security forces to shoot people if necessary. With this, the soldiers fired a Bren gun at the advancing crowd, killing three. The crowd dispersed thereafter.

Violence against Tamils also took place in areas like Kurunegala, Dambulla, Galewela, and Panadura. At 10 a.m. that morning, following the spread of news of the murders of Police Sergeant Appuhamy and D. A. Seneviratne, Sinhalese gangs began beating Tamils in Colombo and several of its suburbs. Shops were burned and looted. At this stage, the violence was largely limited to assault, looting, and arson. That evening, Prime Minister Bandaranaike made an appeal to the nation calling for peace. However, he implied that Tamils had initiated the riots by only mentioning the killings in the Batticaloa District, particularly D. A. Seneviratne's murder, as a cause of communal violence.

=== Countrywide violence ===
==== Violence against Tamils ====
Bandaranaike's appeal ended up triggering far more severe anti-Tamil violence. What had been limited to mostly limited to arson, looting, and assault now included murder and rape. Widespread rioting along the coast from Colombo to Matara was mainly triggered by the return of Sinhalese fishermen who had been chased to the ocean by Tamil rioters in the Eastern Province.

The body of D. A. Seneviratne passed through Badulla on the 26th, which attracted mourners, some of whom were island reconvicted criminals. That night, after the police van left, Tamils in the town were attacked and their boutiques were set on fire. Violence soon spread through the Badulla District. The next day, many Land Development Department laborers came to Badulla town from Kandaketiya. The Government Agent of the Badulla District, accompanied by Badulla MP J. C. T. Kotelawala, appealed to them to leave. After touring the town, they left. On the 28th evening, the laborers, inflamed by false rumors, forcibly stored a large number of weapons in the Muthiyangana Buddhist temple. The military cracked down on the temple the next day and confiscated the weapons before the laborers could wreak havoc. Kotelawala claimed that every Tamil person in Badulla town would have been killed if things had gone according to “Operation Kekira”, a plan premeditated by Sinhalese conspirators.

In Panadura, a rumor spread that Tamils had cut off the breasts and murdered a female teacher in Batticaloa. Upon hearing this rumour, a Sinhalese gang tried to burn down the Hindu Kovil; unable to set fire to the building, they pulled out a Brahmin priest and burned him alive instead. Subsequent investigations showed there was no female teacher from Panadura stationed in Batticaloa. Gangs roamed Colombo, looking for people who might be Tamil. The usual way to distinguish Tamils from Sinhalese was to look for men who wore shirts outside of their pants, or men with pierced ears, both common customs among Tamils. People who could not read a Sinhala newspaper (which included some Sinhalese who were educated in English) were beaten or killed.

One trick used by the gangs was to disguise themselves as policemen. They would tell Tamils to flee to the police station for their safety. Once the Tamils had left, the empty houses were looted and burned. Across the country, arson, rape, pillage and murder spread. Though the state police eventually helped to quell the riots, they were accused of being initially inactive and even fanning the riots in several places. Some Sinhalese did try to protect their Tamil neighbours, often risking their own lives to shelter them in their homes.

Sinhalese laborers of the Land Development and Irrigation Department from Padaviya formed a mob armed with firearms, hand bombs, knives, and other weapons. They also had trucks to transport them. Though they planned on going to Anuradhapura, they took an indirect route on the Padaviya—Kebitigollewa—Vavuniya Road to outmaneuver the army, attacking whatever Tamils they could find on the way. The army and police intercepted the rioters south of Kebitigollewa. They killed 11 rioters, and arrested 343. Some of the prisoners later confessed that they would have gone further south to Matale and Kandy had they not been stopped.

==== Violence against Sinhalese ====
After the Polonnaruwa incidents of 23 and 24 May, Tamil rioters in Eravur retaliated against isolated Sinhalese homes and trades people. In Eravur, fishermen from the two communities fought on the seashore. Tamil gangs set up roadblocks, beating up motorists believed to be Sinhalese. A Sinhalese man and his wife were set on fire and their belongings were looted. The violence intensified after news of the murders of the Panadura priest and Tamil fiscal clerk in Kalutara circulated. In various parts of the Batticaloa District, Sinhalese were mercilessly killed by Tamil rioters. In Valaichchenai, Muslims sheltered Sinhalese who fled from Tamil mobs. 56 cases of arson and attacks were registered in the Batticaloa District, and 11 murders were recorded, but it is believed that the actual number of Sinhalese killed in Karativu alone is far larger than the official statistic. Many Sinhalese had managed to flee by water and land on the southern coast, but others had fled into the jungle, where they had succumbed to hunger and wild animals. The houses and huts of Sinhalese that had already fled were looted and then burned.

Jaffna turned violent on May 28 with the arrival of the news of the murder of the Panadura priest. No deaths were reported, but some Sinhalese merchants had their inventories burned. Tamil mobs would order Sinhalese out of their properties, loot valuables, and then burn the properties. The behavior of the mobs led politicians in Colombo to suspect that the violence was organized. A mob attacked the Buddhist Naga Vihare temple, which was rebuilt afterwards. The mob tried to kill a Buddhist monk there, but he was saved by the police. Two days later, a mob from Kayts moved onto the Nagadipa Vihare temple at Nainativu and destroyed it.

== Government response ==
Prime Minister Bandaranaike initially avoided taking decisive action and it took four days after the riots had begun for a state of emergency to be imposed. Leader of the Opposition N. M. Perera accused the Prime Minister of being 24 hours too late in taking action, citing police officers who said they had no orders to take firm action on the 26 and 27 May.

As violence was spreading island-wide, a delegation of members of parliament and leading citizens met with Prime Minister Bandaranaike, urging him to declare a state of emergency and bring the situation under control. The delegation included R. E. Jayatilleke, Ahmed Hussain Macan Markar, Razeek Fareed, M. P. Drahaman, Sir Arunachalam Mahadeva, Selwyn Sarnaraweera, R. S. F. de Mel, Devar Suriya Sena, Stephen Samarakkody, J. Tyagarajah and Dr. M.G. Perera. Prime Minister was not moved. Thereafter, Sir Oliver Goonetilleke, Governor General of Ceylon called on the prime minister at his private residence, urging him to act immediately.

Following formal request by the prime minister and his cabinet, Governor General declared a state of emergency under the articles of the Public Security Ordinance at noon on the 27 May. It was the first time an island wide state of emergency was declared. Exercising his reserve powers under a state of emergency ordered the full deployment of the Ceylon Armed Forces to assist the police in suppressing the violence and restoring peace.

The small Ceylon Army under the command of Major General Anton Muttukumaru, deployed its regular units from Colombo and Diyatalawa consisting of the Ceylon Light Infantry and the Ceylon Singha Regiment respectively. The Ceylon Volunteer Force was called out to supplement the regulars, with the Royal Ceylon Navy (RCyN) called out to assist under the direct command of its service chief, Rear Admiral Royce de Mel. A dusk to dawn curfew was enforced and Sir Oliver Goonetilleke coordinated security operations from the Queen's House, Colombo, issuing orders shoot on sight to shoot to kill. RCyN opening fire on mobs to clear the Fort and Pettah areas in Colombo and the Army cleared south of Colombo. By nightfall Colombo was cleared of rioters. The following day an army detachment under Colonel F. C. De Saram opened fire on an armed mob near the Ceylon Transport Board depot at Ratmalana after armed CTB employees confronted the army after one of its drives had been shot the night before by a Tamil constable. Police patrols supported by army detachments engaged gangs of rioters in Anuradhapura and Padaviya areas who has been armed with shotguns, rifles, homemade bombs and molotov cocktails led by World War II veterans. Within two days, the military had restored order in Colombo district and eventually the rest of the country. The Ceylon Engineers constructed temporary shelters to house the displaced and the Ceylon Army Service Corps undertook to feed and transporting of the displaced.

The army was eventually withdrawn from civilian areas in the rest of the country, but remained present in Jaffna for 25 years as part of the existing "Operation Monty", later expanded to Task Force Anti Illicit Immigration.

The Governor General also imposed restrictions on press freedom and warned reporters of the consequences of defying his orders by invoking the Detention Laws under the Emergency Regulations. The Federal Party, the main political party representing the island's Tamil population, and the Sinhalese chauvinist Jathika Vimukthi Peramuna were both banned soon after the riots and their leaders were placed under house arrests. Over 2,000 Sinhalese fled the Jaffna Peninsula and over 10,000 Tamils were evacuated in Colombo alone. The government secretly commissioned six European ships to resettle most of them in Jaffna in early June. Bandaranaike showed partiality to the Sinhalese community by visiting the Thurstan Road camp housing Sinhalese evacuees from Jaffna but not the nearby Royal College camp housing Tamils; and by, according to Dr. N. M. Perera, allowing the Buddhist monk Mapitigama Buddharakkitha, a member of the Bandaranaike government and a leader of the Eksath Bhikkhu Peramuna which had been agitating for Sinhala Only Act, to broadcast his "incitement" speech over the radio.

== Aftermath ==
Government members of parliament from the Mahajana Eksath Peramuna found it difficult to face their constituents such as in the case of C. P. de Silva. B. Weerasinghe, Assistant Superintendent of Police in Charge of North-Central Province and Inspector D. D. S. Ranasinghe, Officer in Charge, Anuradhapura Police Station were awarded the Ceylon Police Medal for gallantry by the Governor General in July 1958 for the bravery in engaging armed rioters in the North-Central Province and Anuradhapura respectively.

On 3 September 1958 the Tamil Language (Special Provisions) Act – which provided for the use of the Tamil language as a medium of instruction, as a medium of examination for admission to the Public Service, for use in state correspondence and for administrative purposes in the Northern and Eastern Provinces – was passed, substantially fulfilling the part of the Bandaranaike-Chelvanayakam Pact dealing with the language issue, only to be flouted in 1960 when Sinhala was declared the only official language.

== Legacy ==
As the first full-scale race riot in Ceylon in over forty years, the events of 1958 shattered the trust the communities had in one another. Both major ethnic groups blamed the other for the crisis, and became convinced that any further compromises would be interpreted as a sign of weakness and be exploited. A partial emigration of Tamils from Sinhalese-majority areas and Sinhalese from Tamil-majority areas occurred. The LTTE leader Velupillai Prabhakaran, a small boy at the time of the riots, stated that his political views were shaped by the events of 1958:

"The shocking events of the 1958 racial riots had a profound impact on me when I was a schoolboy. I heard of horrifying incidents of how our people had been mercilessly and brutally put to death by Sinhala racists. Once I met a widowed mother, a friend of my family, who related to me her agonizing personal experience of this racial holocaust. During the riots, a Sinhala mob attacked her house in Colombo. The rioters set fire to the house and murdered her husband. She and her children escaped with severe burn injuries. I was deeply shocked when I saw the scars on her body. I also heard stories of how young babies were roasted alive in boiling tar. When I heard such stories of cruelty, I felt a deep sense of sympathy and love for my people. A great passion overwhelmed me to redeem my people from this racist system. I strongly felt that armed struggle was the only way to confront a system which employs armed might against unarmed, innocent people.”

For him and many other Tamils, the burning to death of the Panadura Hindu priest greatly affected their thinking:

"Ours is a god-fearing society and people are religious-minded. The widespread feeling was: when a priest like him was burnt alive, why did we not have the capability to hit back. That was one atrocity that made people think deeply.”

The famous book "Emergency '58" records the events of this pogrom. The book also explores into the manifestation of Sinhalese nationalism in the form of anti-Tamil movement in a large-scale pogrom as a result of closely coordinated action of politicians, Buddhist monks, and rural Sinhalese.

Prime Minister Bandaranaike was assassinated the following year by a Buddhist monk, leading to months of political instability from which his party reemerged to form a stable government under his widow Sirimavo in 1960. The senior leadership of the Christian-dominated Armed Forces and Ceylon Police Force were left feeling disgruntled by the riots, which they felt were rooted in Bandaranaike's misgovernance and capitulation to communal forces, and resented his political interference of communal nature. The group of Christian military and police officers who participated in the 1962 Ceylonese coup d'état attempt traced their first thoughts of a coup to the riots.

== See also ==
- List of riots in Sri Lanka
- Black July
- Sri Lankan Civil War
