= Sinhala Only Act =

1956 act making Sinhala the official language in Ceylon

Official Language Act

Parliament of Ceylon
- Long title: An act to prescribe the Sinhala language as the one official language of Ceylon and to enable certain transitory provisions to be made.
- Citation: No. 33 of 1956
- Territorial extent: Ceylon
- Enacted by: Parliament of Ceylon
- Commenced: 7 July 1956

Amended by
- Tamil Language (Special Provisions) Act (No. 28 of 1958)

Related legislation
- Thirteenth Amendment to the Constitution of Sri Lanka

The Official Language Act (No. 33 of 1956), commonly referred to as the Sinhala Only Act, was an act passed in the Parliament of Ceylon in 1956. The act replaced English with Sinhala as the sole official language of Ceylon, with the exclusion of Tamil from the act.

At the time, Sinhala (also known as Sinhalese) was the language of Ceylon's majority Sinhalese people, who accounted for around 70% of the country's population. Tamil was the first language of Ceylon's three largest minority ethnic groups, the Indian Tamils, Sri Lankan Tamils and Moors, who together accounted for around 29% of the country's population.

The act was controversial as its supporters saw it as an attempt by a community that had just gained independence to distance themselves from their colonial masters, while its opponents viewed it as an attempt by the linguistic majority to oppress and assert dominance on minorities. The Act symbolizes the post-independent Sinhalese majority's determination to assert Ceylon's identity as a Sinhala Buddhist nation state, and for Tamils, it became a symbol of minority oppression and a justification for them to demand a separate nation-state, Tamil Eelam, which was a factor in the emergence of the decades-long Sri Lankan Civil War.

== British rule ==
During the British colonial era, English was the official language in Ceylon (known as Sri Lanka since 1972). Until the passage of the Free Education Bill in 1944, education in the English language was the preserve of the Sri Lankan elite and the ordinary people had little knowledge of it. A disproportionate number of English language schools were established in Jaffna by the American Ceylon Mission, which provided English-language skills for the Tamil population in Jaffna. Thus, English-speaking Tamils held a higher percentage of coveted Ceylon Civil Service jobs, which required English fluency, than their share of the island's population:

Ceylon Civil Service, 1870-1946
Year	Total	Sinhalese	Tamil	Burgher
1870	81	7	not recorded	not recorded
1907	95	4	2	6
1925	135	17	8	14
1946	160	69	31	-

Proportion of Tamil and Sinhalese speaking government employees 1946-2004
	Sinhalese	Tamil
1946 Civil Service	44.5%	20%
1946 Judicial Service	46.7%	28.9%
1980 Civil Service	85%	11%
2004 Civil Service	90%	8.5%

By 1946, 33% of clerical jobs in Ceylon were held by Sri Lankan Tamils, although they were 11% of the country's population. However, the focus on percentages obscures the fact that the actual difference in number of jobs was quite small, for example, in 1948, Tamils accounted for 46% of government accountants and 40% of irrigation engineers, which was equivalent to 20 more Tamil accountants and 10 more Tamil engineers in proportion. The overall difference in number of government jobs was minute considering that the overall workforce was approximately 3 million people, most of whom were working in agriculture, petty manufacturing and trade.

After their election to the State Council of Ceylon in 1936, the Lanka Sama Samaja Party (LSSP) members N. M. Perera and Philip Gunawardena demanded the replacement of English as the official language by Sinhala and Tamil. In November 1936, a motion that "in the Municipal and Police Courts of the Island the proceedings should be in the vernacular" and that "entries in police stations should be recorded in the language in which they are originally stated" were passed by the State Council and referred to the legal secretary.

In the 1940s, Sinhala political leaders were willing to support both Sinhala and Tamil as the official languages. For example, in 1944, both J. R. Jayewardene and S. W. R. D. Bandaranaike supported both languages getting official status, with Bandaranaike saying that he had "no personal objections to both languages being considered official languages, nor do I see any particular harm of danger or difficulty from this."

However, nothing was done about these matters, and English continued to be the official language until 1956.

== Ceylon after independence ==
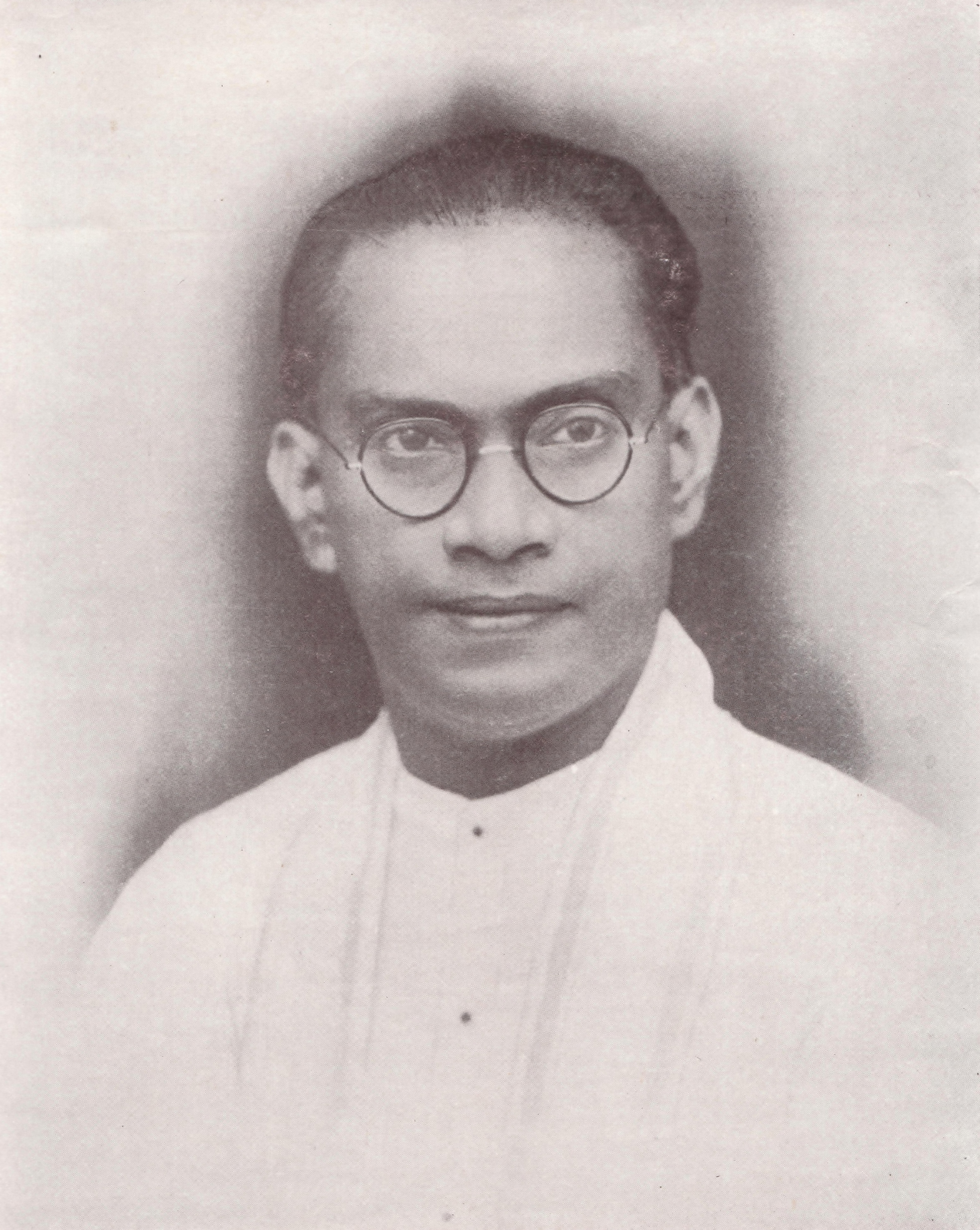
Prime Minister S. W. R. D. Bandaranayaka.

Ceylon was granted the status of dominion in the British Empire in 1948 after largely non-violent independence movement, with the transition of sovereignty from Britain to the Sri Lankans being a peaceful process. For the first years of independence, there was an attempt to balance the interests of the elites of the main communities: the Sinhalese and the Tamils. In 1949 the government disenfranchised the Indian Tamil plantation workers, who accounted for 12% of the population.

In 1951, the ambitious Solomon Bandaranaike broke with his party, the conservative United National Party (UNP), and created a new centrist party, the Sri Lanka Freedom Party (SLFP). By 1953, the proposal for the use of Sinhala and Tamil as official languages was replaced by the chauvinist cry for 'Sinhala only', and the argument that Sinhala would be 'swamped' by Tamil. Arguments were made that 'Sinhala only' would give better opportunities for the Sinhalese.

In 1955, the SLFP decided to break ranks with the general consensus on the left to have both Sinhala and Tamil as official languages to campaign on the slogan "Sinhala Only".

== Enactment ==
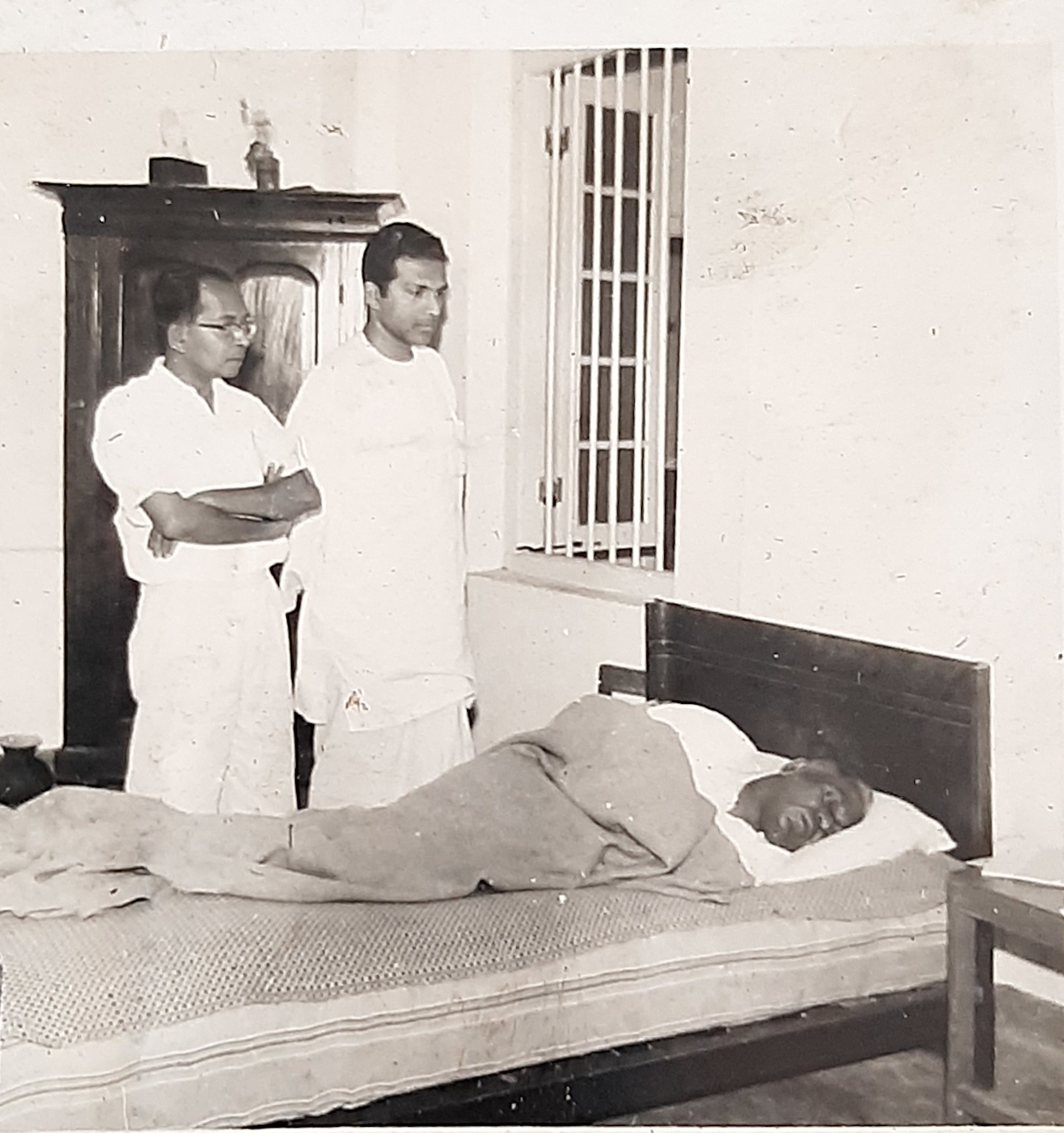
Fast unto death by Prof. F. R. Jayasuriya in 1956, to force Bandaranaike government to implement the Sinhala as the only State language excluding Tamil language of masses in the country's north and east provinces.

In the 1956 general elections, the SLFP campaigned on largely nationalist policies, and made the language policy one of their key election promises. The result was a landslide electoral victory for the SLFP lead coalition Mahajana Eksath Peramuna, which paved the way for Bandaranaike's appointment as Prime Minister. The Sinhala nationalist demanded that their new government immediately implement promise to make Sinhala the official state language. When Bandaranaike proceed to make Sinhala the official state language with administrative provisions for Tamil, K. M. P. Rajaratne and Professor F. R. Jayasuriya went on a fast unto death demanding legislation be drafted to make Sinhala the only official state with no concessions to Tamil language. This forced Bandaranaike to drop the administrative provisions for Tamil and The Ceylon (Constitution) Order in Council or Sinhala Only Bill as it was known was passed through parliament and was enacted. The bill was passed with the SLFP and the UNP supporting it, with the leftist LSSP and Communist Party of Sri Lanka as well as the Tamil nationalist parties (Illankai Tamil Arasu Kachchi and All Ceylon Tamil Congress) opposing it.

== Tamil and Sinhalese opposition to the Act ==
The left bitterly opposed the Act, with N. M. Perera, leader of the LSSP, moving a motion in Parliament that it "should be amended forthwith to provide for the Sinhala and Tamil languages to be state languages of Ceylon with parity of status throughout the Island."

Colvin R. de Silva of the LSSP famously argued against the Act:

Do we want an independent Ceylon or two bleeding halves of Ceylon...? These are issues that in fact we have been discussing under the form and appearance of the language issue…One language, two nations; Two languages, one Nation…

The passage of the act was met with demonstrations from Tamils led by the Federal Party who organized a satyagraha outside the parliament building. In response, the Sinhalese nationalist group Eksath Bhikkhu Peramuna organized a counter-protest; a mob representing this group attacked the Tamil protesters and was "responsible for unleashing riots that killed nearly 150 Tamils" in the Gal Oya riots between 5 and 6 June 1956.

Bandaranaike stated in parliament on 6 June 1956 that Sinhalese people saw parity between Sinhala and Tamil as official languages as being "gravely detrimental to the continuance and progress of the Sinhala language; that it would almost imply the extinction of the Sinhala language."

== Tamil Language (Special Provisions) Act ==
In order to assuage Tamil feelings following the anti-Tamil riots in 1958, Prime Minister S.W.R.D. Bandaranaike passed the Tamil Language (Special Provisions) Act, No. 28 of 1958 in August that year. The bill allowed for the use of Tamil as a medium of instruction in schools and universities, as a medium of examination for admission into public service (with the proviso requiring Sinhala fluency within certain time period), and for official correspondence and administrative purposes in the Northern and Eastern provinces. However, following the assassination of Bandaranaike the next year by a Buddhist monk over alleged racial betrayal, the regulations needed to implement the bill would not be submitted for parliamentary approval for another eight years. Starting from January 1961, the new government led by S.W.R.D.'s widow Sirimavo Bandaranaike sought to forcefully implement the Sinhala Only Act and, under Sinhalese nationalist pressure, enacted the Language of the Courts Act No. 3 of 1961 to make Sinhala the only language of the courts, while ignoring the Tamil Language (Special Provisions) Act. Although the regulations for implementing the latter bill were approved in January 1966 under Dudley Senanayake, it would be relegated to a "subordinate legislation" with the adoption of the Republican Constitution in 1972 under Sirimavo Bandaranaike which consolidated the 'Sinhala-only' policy, thus affirming the subordinate status of the Tamil language:

"the Tamils felt indignant that it was specifically stated in the constitution that the provisions relating to the Tamil language could be amended by ordinary legislation whereas the provisions relating to the Sinhalese were constitutionally entrenched."

== Effect ==
The policy turned out to be "severely discriminatory" and placed the Tamil-speaking population at a "serious disadvantage". As a Sinhalese academic A. M. Navaratna Bandara writes: "The Tamil-speaking people were given no option but to learn the language of the majority if they wanted to get public service employment. [...] A large number of Tamil public servants had to accept compulsory retirement because of their inability to prove proficiency in the official language [....]" It also entailed that a Sinhalese officer working in Tamil areas was exempted from learning Tamil, but a Tamil officer working in even Tamil areas had to learn Sinhala. The effects of these policies were dramatic as shown by the drastic drop of Tamil representation in public sector: "In 1956, 30 percent of the Ceylon administrative service, 50 percent of the clerical service, 60 percent of engineers and doctors, and 40 percent of the armed forces were Tamil. By 1970 those numbers had plummeted to 5 percent, 5 percent, 10 percent, and 1 percent, respectively." For much of the 1960s government forms and services were virtually unavailable to Tamils, and this situation only partly improved with later relaxations of the law.

== Languages today ==
Following pressure from the Indian government in 1987, the Thirteenth Amendment to the Constitution was passed, which stated that, "the official language of Sri Lanka is Sinhala" while "Tamil shall also be an official language," with English as a "link language." However, in practice, predominantly Sinhala-speaking police officers who are not fluent in Tamil are stationed in Tamil areas, posing practical challenges for the locals when interacting with the authorities.
