= Bandaranaike–Chelvanayakam Pact =

1957 political agreement in Sri Lanka

The Bandaranaike–Chelvanayakam Pact was an agreement signed between the Prime Minister of Sri Lanka S. W. R. D. Bandaranaike and the leader of the main Tamil political party in Sri Lanka S. J. V. Chelvanayakam on July 26, 1957. It advocated the creation of a series of regional councils in Sri Lanka as a means to giving a certain level of autonomy to the Tamil people of the country, and was intended to solve the communal disagreements that were occurring in the country at the time.

The act was strongly opposed by certain sections of the Sinhalese (while a few Tamil politicians opposed it for not going far enough), and was eventually torn up by Prime Minister Bandaranaike in May 1958 due to the pressure of Buddhist monks. The abandonment of the pact led to tensions between the two communities, resulting in a series of outbreaks of ethnic violence in the country which eventually spiraled into the 26 year Sri Lankan Civil War. Prime Minister Bandaranaike's later attempts to pass legislation similar to the agreement was met by strong opposition.

== Background ==
Following the gaining of independence for Sri Lanka from Britain in 1948, English continued to be the official language of the country. However sections within the Sinhalese community, who wanted the country to distance itself from its colonial past, began a campaign to have Sinhala made the official language of Sri Lanka. At the 1956 parliamentary elections, the leader of the Mahajana Eksath Peramuna, S. W. R. D. Bandaranaike campaigned on a promise to make Sinhala the sole official language of Sri Lanka. Bandaranaike won the election and was named the 4th Prime Minister of Sri Lanka. After his government was set up, he made it his priority to follow up on his promises related to the language issue, and introduced the Official Language Act (commonly known as the Sinhala Only Act) on June 5, 1956. In opposition to the act, Tamil People staged a hartal in parts of the country, and demonstrated in front of the parliament at Galle Face Green.

In reaction to the legislation, the main Tamil political party in Sri Lanka, the Federal Party (known as the Ilankai Tamil Arasu Kadchi in Tamil) put forward four major demands at their convention held in Trincomalee on August 20, 1956. They were,

- The establishment of a new constitution for Sri Lanka based on federal principles, with the creation of one or more Tamil states enjoying wide autonomous powers
- Parity status for Tamil alongside Sinhala as the official languages of the country
- The repeal of citizenship laws that denied Indian Tamils Sri Lankan citizenship
- The cessation of state dry land colonization schemes

The Federal Party vowed that if their demands were not met by August 20, 1957, they would engage in “direct action by non-violent means” to achieve these objectives. They also called on their supporters to prepare for a prolonged struggle.

At the same time, Prime Minister Bandaranaike faced pressure from Sinhalese extremist groups who complained about the delays in enforcing the Official Languages Act.

== Signing of the pact ==
" In the discussion which the leaders of the Federal Party had with me, an honourable solution was reached. In thinking over this problem I had in mind the fact that I am not merely a Prime Minister but a Buddhist Prime Minister."

—Bandaranaike

Fearing that violence would break out if an agreement between the leaders of the communities was not reached, S. W. R. D. Bandaranaike reached out to the Federal Party leadership, who agreed to meet the Prime Minister in April 1957. The first meeting between a Federal Part delegation comprising its leader S. J. V. Chelvanayakam, V. A. Kandiah, N. R. Rajavarothayam, Dr E. M. V. Naganathan and V. Navaratnam, and a government delegation which included Prime Minister Bandaranaike, Minister Stanley de Zoysa and P. Navaratnarajah took place at Bandaranaike's ancestral house at Horagolla. A second meeting took place at Bandaranaike's residence in Rosemead Place, Colombo, and a final meeting was held at the Senate building on July 26, 1957. The discussions concluded successfully, with an agreement reached between the leaders. It was described by the ITAK as an “interim adjustment”, and would later be known as the Bandaranaike–Chelvanayakam Pact.

The pact was a landmark in the history of Sri Lanka, as it marked for the first time a political agreement had been reached between the leaders of the two main ethnic groups of the country. Both sides made concessions by agreeing to the pact, with Chelvanayakam accepting less than federalism that had been demanded by the Federal Party, and Bandaranaike agreeing to give regional councils substantial powers.

However the pact left out the issue of citizenship for Tamils of Indian origin. Chelvanayakam was also not entirely pleased that he had been unable to obtain a single, merged, North-Eastern province for Tamils, as he feared a divide could ensue between Tamil people in the north and the east of the country. Despite the initial doubts, the agreement was seen as a reasonable compromise by both sides, and it was believed that both Bandaranaike and Chelvanayakam had enough credibility amongst their communities to pass it through. With the agreement, the government was also able to prevent the campaign threatened by the Federal Party across the country.

As an initial step towards implementing the pact, the legislators of the Mahajana Eksath Peramuna agreed on a draft of the Regional Councils Bill, which would combine the 22 districts of the country into regions. The councilors of the Regional Councils were to be chosen by urban and municipal councilors.

== Opposition ==
The pact was greeted by mixed reception around the country, and was immediately opposed by certain sections of both communities.

The leader of the All Ceylon Tamil Congress, G. G. Ponnambalam opposed the pact, as did Member of Parliament C Suntheralingham, who in a letter to Chelvanayakam wrote that instead of the regional councils promised by the pact, he wanted “an autonomous Tamil state which would constitute a Commonwealth of Dominion of Tamil Ilankai”.

It also sparked suspicion among Sinhalese nationalist leaders, who saw it as a sell out to Tamil people. The main opposition in the Sinhalese community came from the opposition United National Party, headed by J. R. Jayawardene. Following the defeat of the UNP in the 1956 elections, Jayawardene invited former leader Dudley Senanayake to re-enter politics, and UNP used their opposition to the agreement as the basis of their return to active politics.

=== March to Kandy ===
In September 1957, Jayawardene announced a 72-mile march from Colombo to the central city of Kandy in opposition to the pact. He declared that at the end of the march, he would pray against the agreement at the sacred Buddhist shrine the Temple of the Tooth, and invoke the blessings of the gods against the agreement. The proposed march was banned by the government, which cited fears of violence, but the ban was ignored by the UNP.

The march began on October 4, 1957, with Jayawardene at the head of the procession. At Grandpass junction in Colombo, the march was pelted with stones by supporters of the SLFP. Opposition to the march intensified further as it passed Kelaniya, and S. D. Bandaranaike, nephew of Prime Minister Bandaranaike, squatted in the middle of the road with his supporters to stop the march at Imbulgoda, in Gampaha. As a result, the UNP was forced to give up the march, and they proceeded to Kandy by vehicle, where they declared they would oppose the setting up of regional councils.

=== Continuing ethnic tensions ===
As opposition to the agreement was growing, other factors were causing increased tensions between the two communities. In March 1958, the government introduced legislation to place the Sinhala sri character on the number plates of all state vehicles in the country. This was strongly opposed by Tamil people, and the Federal Party organized an “anti-sri” campaign. Participants in the campaign went around the north of the country applying tar on the sri character on vehicles they came across. This was met with anger amongst the Sinhalese community. Sinhalese gangs subsequently painted over Tamil characters in signs around the south of the country.

== Abrogation ==
Amid the growing opposition to the pact, Prime Minister Bandaranaike continued his efforts to convince the people of the country that it was the best solution to the communal problems of the country. He equated the pact to the Middle Way doctrine of Buddhism. However the demonstrations continued, and came to a head on April 9, 1958 when approximately 100 Buddhist monks and 300 other people staged a protest on the lawn of Bandaranaike's Rosemead Place residence. They demanded that the Prime Minister abrogate the agreement he signed with Chelvanayakam.

After listening to the monks and consulting a few members of his cabinet, Bandaranaike publicly tore the agreement into pieces. Upon the insistence of the monks, he also gave them a written pledge that the pact would be abrogated.

=== Reaction ===
The Prime Minister's decision to abrogate the pact was greeted with dismay by moderate Tamil politicians. Savumiamoorthy Thondaman called it the “saddest day in the history of Ceylon’s racial relations”. V Navaratnam, a member of the Federal party who took part in the initial discussions later wrote “(Bandaranaike's enemies) forced him to treat the B-C Pact like Adolf Hitler treated the solemn undertaking which he gave to Neville Chamberlain at Munich. To them the B-C Pact was as much a piece of paper as was the Munich paper to Hitler."

In response to the abrogation, the Federal Party declared they would launch a direct action campaign in the form of a non-violent Satyagraha to achieve their objectives. The decision was announced at the party's annual convention held in May 1958. However, before the protests could begin, a series of riots broke out across the country, further damaging relations between the two communities.

== Assassination of Bandaranaike ==
On August 5, 1958, Prime Minister Bandaranaike introduced the Tamil Language (Special Provisions) Act No. 28 of 1958, as a compromise measure to appease the Tamil community. The bill act part of the original Official Languages Act, but had been removed at the insistence of Sinhalese extremists. The bill was passed on August 14, 1958, and it dealt with the provisions regarding education, public service entrance examinations and the administration of the north and east of the country. However it did not satisfy the Tamil politicians, and it also led Buddhists who worked for Bandaranaike to be increasingly dissatisfied with him.

At the same time, the country faced unrelated anti-government strikes organized by the leftist LSSP and other communist parties in the country. In May 1959, leftist members of Bandaranaike's administration including Philip Gunawardena quit the government and joined the opposition.

As Prime Minister S. W. R. D. Bandaranaike struggled to keep his party in power, Talduwe Somarama, a Buddhist monk called upon Bandaranaike at his residence in Rosemead Place. As Bandaranaike was paying obeisance to Somarama, the monk took out a revolver and shot Bandaranaike in his stomach at point blank range. Bandaranaike succumbed to his injuries the next day. A commission of inquiry later found that the monk was manipulated by former supporters of Bandaranaike, who helped him get elected in 1956, but now opposed his moves to appease the Tamil population.

== Later attempts to revive the pact ==
At the 1960 parliamentary elections in Sri Lanka, no party was able to obtain a majority in the country's 151 member legislature. As a result, the United National Party, which obtained the most seats by a single party, formed an unstable minority government. In its quest to form a government, the Sri Lanka Freedom Party (SLFP), successor to the Mahajana Eksath Peramuna, reached out to the Federal Party, and the two sides reached an agreement that if the Federal Party helped the SLFP form a government, the Bandaranaike–Chelvanayakam Pact would be included in the throne speech as a policy statement of the new SLFP government.

As a result, the SLFP and the Federal Party, along with a number of other minority parties, voted against the speaker nominee of the UNP government, and on April 22, 1960 defeated the throne speech of the UNP government by a majority of 86 votes to 61. However instead of calling on the SLFP to form a government, the Governor General of the country called for fresh elections in July of the same year.

Throughout the subsequent election campaign, the SLFP maintained contact with the Federal Party, and the agreement to include the Bandaranaike–Chelvanayakam Pact in the throne speech of a future SLFP government remained. At the July elections, the SLFP achieved a convincing victory, winning 75 seats. This permitted the party, now headed by assassinated Prime Minister S. W. R. D Bandaranaike's widow Sirimavo Bandaranaike, to form a government without the help of the Federal Party. As a result, they cast aside the agreement with the Federal Party, and later introduced legislation to make Sinhala the official language of the courts of the country.

In explaining the decision, Felix Dias Bandaranaike said the government did not go through with the agreement as it would have given the UNP an opportunity to “incite the Sinhalese extremists” as they had done in 1957.

== See also ==
- Sri Lankan Tamil nationalism
- Sinhalese Buddhist nationalism
- Tamil militant groups
