= P. R. Anthonis =

Deshamanya Dr P. R. Anthonis

Chancellor of the University of Colombo
- In office 1981–2002

Personal details
- Born: January 21, 1911
- Died: 17 December 2009 (aged 98)
- Education: Ceylon Medical College, St Peter's College, Colombo
- Profession: Surgeon

Deshamanya Polwattearachchige Romiel Anthonis FRCS (21 January 1911 – 17 December 2009), known as "P. R. Anthonis", was a leading Sri Lankan surgeon. He was Chancellor of the University of Colombo from 1981 to 2002.

== Early life and education ==
Born on January 21, 1911, as the second in a family of 16. Anthonis was educated at Milagiriya Singhalese School, St. Joseph’s College, South (now St Peter's College, Colombo) and went on to study medicine at Ceylon Medical College graduating in 1936 winning Loos Gold Medal for Pathology, the Matthew Gold Medal for Forensic Medicine, the Rockwood Gold Medal for Surgery and the Government Diploma Medal after a laps of 11 years. Soon after graduating he join the Ceylon Medical Service. Following World War II, he left for Britain to specialize in surgery at the Royal College of Surgeons.

== Medical career ==
He joined the Ceylon Medical Service in 1936 as a Medical Officer during a malaria epidemic. Following the Japanese raid on Trincomalee he was dispatched as a surgeon to Trincomalee. He was invited as a guest to the ceremonial opening of Parliament that marked the start of self-rule in Ceylon on February 4, 1948.

He was the only one who was successful out of the eight other Ceylonese, sat the final FRCS Examination in 1947. Then he became the first Ceylonese surgeon to pass through the primary and final examination for the Fellowship of the Royal College of Surgeons of England (FRCS) without a single examination mishap. After he returned to Ceylon, he was appointed Consultant Visiting Surgeon at the Colombo General Hospital in 1947 and served in that capacity until he retired on 21 January 1971.

During his 70 years as a doctor, he has performed nearly a hundred thousand surgical operations, including one on the fatally wounded Prime Minister S.W.R.D. Bandaranaike after he was shot on 26 September 1959. The records showed that no less than 38,000 of these have been done after his retirement from government service in 1971. Carlo Fonseka had provided a short review of Anthonis's professional career in the Ceylon Medical Journal. He was awarded the title Deshamanya by the Government of Sri Lanka for his service to the country.

== Family ==
He married his wife Ruby, in 1943. The bestman at the wedding was Esmond Wickremesinghe who would later become a press baron.
