= Sri Lanka Freedom Party =

Political party in Sri Lanka

Sri Lanka Freedom Party ශ්‍රී ලංකා නිදහස් පක්‍ෂය இலங்கை சுதந்திரக் கட்சி
- Abbreviation: SLFP
- Chairperson: Nimal Siripala de Silva
- Secretary-General: Duminda Dissanayake
- Founder: S. W. R. D. Bandaranaike
- Founded: 2 September 1951 (75 years ago)
- Preceded by: Sinhala Maha Sabha
- Headquarters: 307, T. B. Jayah Mawatha, Colombo 10, Sri Lanka.
- Newspaper: Singhale, Dinakara
- Youth wing: SLFP Youth Front
- Ideology: Social democracy; Sinhalese Buddhist nationalism
- Political position: Centre-left
- Religion: Theravada Buddhism
- National affiliation: NDF; PA; Former: MEP; UF; UPFA; SLPFA; FPA
- Colours: Blue
- Parliament of Sri Lanka: 3 / 225
- Local Government Bodies: 0 / 340

Election symbol
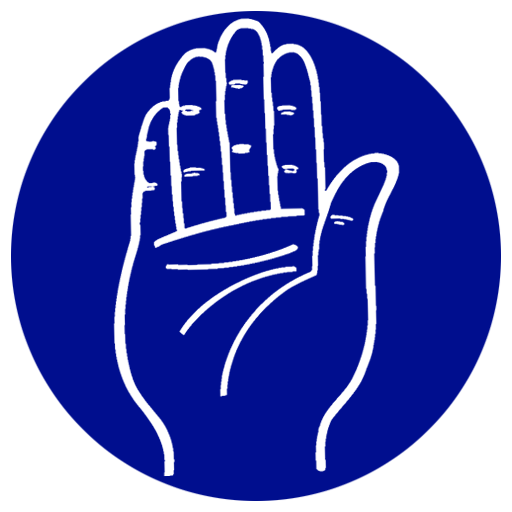
- Hand

Website
- www.slfp.lk

The Sri Lanka Freedom Party (SLFP; Sinhala: ශ්‍රී ලංකා නිදහස් පක්ෂය, romanised: Śrī Laṁkā Nidahas Pakṣaya; Tamil: இலங்கை சுதந்திரக் கட்சி, romanised: Ilaṅkai Cutantirak Kaṭci) is a centre-left political party in Sri Lanka. Founded by S. W. R. D. Bandaranaike in 1951, the party was one of Sri Lanka's two main parties from the 1950s to the 2010s, serving as the main rival of the centre-right United National Party. Following a split in the late 2010s and subsequent electoral losses, the influence of the party has since diminished.

The party is generally considered as having a democratic socialist or progressive economic agenda and is often associated with Sinhalese nationalist parties. The party follows a non-aligned foreign policy but has historically had close ties to socialist nations.

== History ==
The Sri Lanka Freedom Party was founded in 1951, when long-standing United National Party stalwart S. W. R. D. Bandaranaike defected from the party and crossed over to the opposition with several of his other close associates. His party, the Sinhala Maha Sabha, was dissolved and the Sri Lanka Freedom Party was inaugurated.

After Sri Lanka gained its independence, the SLFP represented a form of non-revolutionary socialism and a policy of non-alignment with strong ties to socialist countries. Its social democratic and nationalist policies in the aftermath of Sri Lankan independence supported its rapid rise towards attaining major party status alongside the centre-right United National Party. SLFP founder S. W. R. D. Bandaranaike stated that the basis of the party would be the 'Pancha Maha Balavegaya' (Five Great Forces) which consisted of the native doctors, clergy, teachers, farmers and workers.

After winning 9 seats in the 1952 parliamentary election, Bandaranaike contested the 1956 election on a platform of giving true meaning to the independence achieved in 1948. This involved a nationalist, democratic and socialist program which saw the SLFP achieve a huge victory at the 1956 elections and is seen by many observers as a social revolution resulting in the eclipse of the Westernised elite.

=== Under S. W. R. D. Bandaranaike (1956–1959) ===
The achievements of S. W. R. D. Bandaranaike's term of office include the reverting of major defence facilities from British to local control, initiating a shift in Sri Lanka's foreign policy from the West to the Non-Aligned Movement and lowering the voting age from 21 to 18 years of age.

Working people, a core base of support for the party, also benefited through the setting up of an Employee's Provident Fund and the empowerment of peasants through the Paddy Lands Act. The healthcare and education systems were also improved for the benefit of the common man with the establishment of ayurvedic research centres, recognition of native physicians as well as the allowing of students to learn in their mother tongue (rather than only English).

The S. W. R. D. Bandaranaike government also had a lasting contribution in language policy. In 1956 Sinhala replaced English as the sole official language of Sri Lanka, fulfilling a major election pledge. In reaction to Tamil unease to this change, the Bandaranaike–Chelvanayakam Pact was signed to grant official status to the Tamil language as well. However, the agreement was vehemently opposed by hardline Sinhalese nationalists led by the UNP and instead a watered down act was passed. In September 1959, Bandaranaike was assassinated by Talduwe Somarama, an extremist Buddhist monk opposed to Bandaranaike's supposed attempts to appease the Tamils. He was replaced as prime minister for an interim period by Wijeyananda Dahanayake.

=== Under Sirimavo Bandaranaike (1960–1977) ===
Afterwards, the party turned to Bandaranaike's widow Sirimavo Bandaranaike, who consequently became the world's first elected female head of government in 1960. Sirimavo Bandaranaike was determined to carry on the program of her late husband and her government pursued several socialist policies during its terms of office from 1960 to 1964 and 1970 to 1977. Sirimavo also initiated the trend of the SLFP forging alliances with other leftist parties such as the Communist Party of Sri Lanka and the Lanka Sama Samaja Party, a trend which the SLFP continues to this day.

Under Sirimavo Bandaranaike's leadership, SLFP governments nationalised key sectors of the economy such as banking and insurance, the Ceylon Transport Board and also all schools then owned by the Roman Catholic Church. Issues arose during the state takeover of foreign businesses which upset the United States and Britain. Consequently, this augmented the SLFP's foreign policy shift towards the East and the Non-Aligned Movement. Further, in 1972, the SLFP led government oversaw the introduction of a new constitution which changed the country's name from Ceylon to Sri Lanka and declared Sri Lanka to be a republic.

During her term in office, Sirimavo Bandaranaike achieved high international standing, being chosen as chairman of the Non-Aligned Movement in 1976 and receiving plaudits as the SLFP-led government attempted to mediate between India and China during the Sino-Indian war.

In government, the SLFP had to also overcome a number of challenges to democracy such as the 1962 coup attempt, launched by Christian officers upset by the increasing number of Buddhist officer corp which had previously been three-fifths Christian. Likewise, in 1971 the SLFP-led government was almost toppled by a Marxist insurrection led by the Janatha Vimukthi Peramuna. The insurrection was successfully put down by the Ceylonese government, and the conflict claimed more than a thousand lives.

Towards the end of Sirimavo Bandaranaike's second term as prime minister, her government had become increasingly unpopular amidst a declining economy and charges of corruption. In the 1977 election, the SLFP saw a landslide defeat, winning only eight seats in the legislature. This would be the start of the party's 17 years in opposition.

==== In opposition (1977–1994) ====
This period of opposition was made greatly difficult after President J. R. Jayewardene's government stripped Sirimavo Bandaranaike of her civic rights for 7 years and expelled her from parliament. As a result, the SLFP was forced to field former minister Hector Kobbekaduwa as their candidate at the 1982 presidential election, who failed to deliver a strong outcome for the party. The SLFP suffered another blow the same year, when a referendum to delay parliamentary elections by 6 years was passed. During this period, the party suffered from internal conflicts, with Sirimavo's son Anura Bandaranaike, who led the party in parliament after her expulsion, shifting the traditionally socialist party to the right, while her daughter and future party leader Chandrika Kumaratunga led a breakaway party, the Sri Lanka Mahajana Pakshaya, in response to her brother's shift. In 1989, Sirimavo Bandaranaike was reelected to the parliament and took the lead again; she became leader of the opposition.

In the early 1990s, the existing UNP government had weakened through internal conflicts of its own as well as the descent into two civil wars and fading public support. New SLFP leaders, most prominently Mahinda Rajapaksa, had launched successful pada yatra, jana gosha and white flag campaigns against the UNP government during this period. By this time, Anura Bandaranaike had defected to the UNP to receive ministerial appointments, so Kumaratunga, who had returned to the party, was now the undisputed party leader and successor to her mother. Sirimavo Bandaranaike had lost her influence with the electorate and stepped aside as party leader in favour of her daughter.

=== Under Chandrika Kumaratunga (1994–2005) ===
During the 1994 parliamentary and presidential elections, the SLFP saw a successful return to power and Chandrika Kumaratunga was elected the nation's first female president as part of the SLFP-led People's Alliance coalition. Kumaratunga's tenure marked the beginning of the SLFP's shift from the party's initial socialist policies towards a more centrist philosophy that sought to combine both the free market and the SLFP's traditional people-friendly policies.

The People's Alliance government continued with their predecessor's attempts to negotiate with the LTTE, whilst simultaneously attempting to weaken them militarily through force. The SLFP government however initially placed greater emphasis on achieving peace with the Kumaratunga government engaging in numerous peace talks. However, LTTE intransigence limited the policy's effectiveness. The People's Alliance can be credited however with significant victories on the foreign policy front, with Foreign Affairs Minister Lakshman Kadirgamar spearheading successful efforts to further isolate the LTTE internationally. Another achievement of the Kumaratunga administration was the establishment of several new public universities.

Despite successes on these fronts, the Kumaratunga government also oversaw territorial losses to the LTTE as well as a flagging economy. As a result of this, a UNP government was elected at the 2001 parliamentary elections. In November 2003, Kumaratunga used her presidential powers to take powers away from Prime Minister Ranil Wickremesinghe's UNP in the form of important ministries, and the new SLFP-led alliance, the United People's Freedom Alliance, returned to power at the 2004 parliamentary election with future party leader Mahinda Rajapaksa being appointed as the prime minister.

=== Under Mahinda Rajapaksa (2005–2015) ===
A rift opened up in the party in 2005 over the choice of its candidate at the 2005 presidential election between the President Kumaratunga-backed Anura Bandaranaike and Prime Minister Mahinda Rajapaksa. Many members of the SLFP had been uneasy with Chandrika Kumaratunga's liberal economic policies, privatisation of many public institutions as well as several allegations of corruption against her. Rajapaksa was ultimately selected as the presidential candidate of the SLFP-led United People's Freedom Alliance and was subsequently elected as President.

Under Mahinda Rajapaksa, the SLFP shifted back to the left towards a social democratic program termed 'Mahinda Chinthana'. Some of the companies privatised by the Kumaratunga administration were re-nationalised such as Shell Gas Lanka.

The major legacy of this period of UPFA government was bringing an end to the long-running civil war and the reunification of Sri Lanka. This achievement greatly boosted the popularity of the SLFP, leading to convincing victories in both the presidential and parliamentary polls held in 2010.

In the post-war period, the Rajapaksa administration instituted a large-scale infrastructure and development drive including the construction and renewal of many of Sri Lanka's key roads, mainly using loans from China. In 2011, the construction of Sri Lanka's first expressway was completed. Likewise, new coal and renewable energy power plants were built, improving the nation's power generation capacity. Tourism received a boost specially in Colombo which ranked as the world's fastest growing tourist city in 2015. However, many of these projects launched by Rajapaksa (most named after himself) have been called white elephants, being built ignoring feasibility studies: for example, the Mattala Rajapaksa International Airport built by Rajapaksa only services one budget carrier and was built in the way of a migratory route for birds.

Other policies of the Rajapaksa government include programs to aid farmers and agricultural production, such as the re-launch of the farmer's pension scheme and subsidisation of fertilisers.

In the area of foreign policy, the Rajapaksa government was seen to align itself towards the East, in accordance with SLFP tradition. This situation was augmented by the prevailing geopolitical environment, which led some Western nations to criticise the UPFA government regarding accusations of human rights abuses during the civil war.

During this time the government has been implicated of political kidnappings and claimed the Rajapaksa family was becoming a dynasty which ran the country.

The 2010–2015 period of the SLFP-led government was characterised by high economic growth and a reducing debt-to-GDP ratio. However, the IMF has said Sri Lanka's national accounts "suffer from insufficient data sources and undeveloped statistical techniques" and opposition legislators have accused Rajapaksa of giving overstated growth estimates. One of the top officials in the statistics office was sacked for disobedience and leaking internal information after he said that economic growth data compiled by the office was inflated.

Eventually, allegations of corruption and nepotism saw Mahinda Rajapaksa lose the presidency to SLFP defector Maithripala Sirisena in 2015, who ran against him with the support of the UNP and other smaller parties. The UNP consequently regained power despite the UPFA still holding a majority of seats in the legislature.

=== Under Maithripala Sirisena (2015–2024) ===
Soon after Sirisena's victory, Mahinda Rajapaksa handed over leadership of the party to Sirisena, as per the SLFP constitution which states any SLFP member who is president is automatically leader of the party. Soon afterwards, the SLFP split into two main factions: those who were supportive of president Sirisena and were willing to work with the minority UNP government, and the faction loyal to the Rajapaksas, which acted as the main de facto opposition to the new regime. Nimal Siripala de Silva was appointed as parliamentary leader of the SLFP and the official Leader of the Opposition.

During Sirisena's term as president, SLFP members came to dominate the cabinet numerically, albeit largely with lower ranking positions. The SLFP, especially the Rajapaksa faction, was instrumental in revising the 19th Amendment to the Constitution of Sri Lanka proposed by the UNP, so as to reduce the powers of the president without transferring executive powers to the prime minister. However, rigorous attempts by President Sirisena and the SLFP to modify the current and largely unpopular electoral system were unsuccessful due to stiff opposition from the UNP and other smaller parties.

On 14 August 2015, Sirisena issued a letter stating that pro-Rajapaksa loyalist and General Secretary Anura Priyadarshana Yapa had been removed from the post, claiming that Yapa was going against the party policy and disobeying the commands of chairman. As a result, Sirsena appointed his loyalist Duminda Dissanayake as acting General Secretary 48 hours ahead of parliamentary election, and also obtained court order to prevent Anura Priyadarshana Yapa from functioning as General Secretary thereafter until 24 August 2015. Eventually, Sirisena sacked both the General Secretaries of the SLFP and the UPFA.

In the 2015 parliamentary election, the SLFP-led UPFA won only 95 seats while its opposition, the UNP-led UNFGG won 106 seats. The United National Party, who won the elections, invited the SLFP to jointly create a national unity government and an agreement was signed between the UNP and SLFP. 45 MPs joined the government and 50 MPs including Mahinda Rajapaksa remained in the opposition, which resulted in a split within the SLFP.

==== Alliance with the Sri Lanka Podujana Peramuna (2019–2022) ====
By 2018, the influence of the SLFP in Sri Lankan politics began to decline, suffering a heavy loss in the 2018 local government elections and finishing in third place, while the newly formed Sri Lanka Podujana Peramuna (SLPP) led by former president Mahinda Rajapaksa placed first, winning 40% of the votes and securing the most number of seats and local authorities. In the 2019 presidential elections, though president Sirisena was eligible to run for a second term, the SLFP chose to endorse SLPP candidate Gotabaya Rajapaksa, who won the election.

The SLPP, SLFP and several other smaller parties formed a new political alliance, the Sri Lanka People's Freedom Alliance, to contest in the 2020 Sri Lankan parliamentary elections. The new alliance claimed a landslide victory, winning 145 seats in the parliament.

Between 2021 and 2022, however, the Rajapaksa government was beginning to lose much of its popularity. The ongoing economic crisis was only getting worse due to poor mismanagement by the government. By 2021, the foreign debt of Sri Lanka had risen to 101% of the nation's GDP. The government was also becoming highly nepotistic, with Rajapaksa family brothers Basil Rajapaksa as finance minister and Mahinda Rajapaksa as prime minister, and several more members of the Rajapaksa family holding prominent positions in the government.

On 5 April 2022, amidst increasing discontent with the Rajapaksa government, the SLPP began losing many of its key allies in the SLPFA, including the SLFP. Maithripala Sirisena pledged that the SLFP would become a neutral party and would contest in future elections separately from the SLPP.

On 11 January 2023, the Freedom People's Alliance was formed, consisting of the SLFP, the Uttara Lanka Sabhagaya led by Wimal Weerawansa and the Freedom People's Congress led by Dullas Alahapperuma. All three parties were parties formerly aligned with the SLPP-led SLPFA who later defected from the alliance. The political alliance was a short-lived one, formed to contest in the 2023 local government elections which ultimately never took place. The Freedom People's Congress would again defect to the Samagi Jana Balawegaya led by opposition leader Sajith Premadasa a year later.

=== Internal crisis ===
On 4 April 2024, the Colombo District Court issued an interim injunction temporarily preventing Maithripala Sirisena from functioning as the party chairman until 18 April, following a case filed by former SLFP chairman Chandrika Kumaratunga. A few days later, entrance to the SLFP headquarters in Colombo was suspended to all individuals by the police. On 8 April, Nimal Siripala de Silva was appointed as the acting chairman of the SLFP. On 21 April 2024, the pro-Sirisena faction of the party appointed cabinet minister Wijeyadasa Rajapakshe acting chairman of the SLFP. Now with two acting chairmen, the internal rift within the SLFP worsened further. Rajapakshe revealed that he received several requests from members of the party's central committee to contest in the upcoming presidential elections as the SLFP candidate.

On 12 May 2024, Sirisena announced his resignation as chairman of the SLFP, and the pro-Sirisena faction unanimously voted to appoint Wijeyadasa Rajapakse as the new chairman. However, the anti-Sirisena faction of the SLFP still disapproved of the appointment.

In the 2024 presidential elections, the party was split into three factions, with the Sirisena faction supporting National Democratic Front candidate Wijeyadasa Rajapakse, the Siripala faction supporting then-incumbent president Ranil Wickremesinghe, and the Dayasiri faction supporting opposition leader Sajith Premadasa.

== Electoral history ==
=== Presidential ===
Election year	Candidate	Votes	%	±	Result
1982	Hector Kobbekaduwa	2,548,438	39.07%	39.07	Lost
1988	Sirimavo Bandaranaike	2,289,860	44.95%	▲5.88	Lost
1994	Chandrika Kumaratunga	4,709,205	62.28%	▲17.33	Won
1999	Chandrika Kumaratunga	4,312,157	51.12%	▼11.16	Won
2005	Mahinda Rajapaksa	4,887,152	50.29%	▼0.83	Won
2010	Mahinda Rajapaksa	6,015,934	57.88%	▲7.59	Won
2015	Mahinda Rajapaksa	5,768,090	47.58%	▼10.30	Lost (Note: Despite Rajapaksa's defeat, the winner, Maithripala Sirisena, was of the Sri Lanka Freedom Party and subsequently became party chairman.)
2019	Supported Gotabaya Rajapaksa	6,924,255	52.25%	▲4.67	Won
2024	Supported Ranil Wickremesinghe	2,299,767	17.27%	▼34.98	Lost

=== Parliamentary ===
Election year	Votes	Vote %	Seats won	+/–	Leader	Result for the party
1952	361,250	15.52%	9 / 95	9	S. W. R. D. Bandaranaike	Opposition
1956	1,046,277	39.52%	51 / 95	▲42	S. W. R. D. Bandaranaike	Government
1960 (March)	647,175	21.28%	46 / 151	▼5	C. P. de Silva	Opposition
1960 (July)	1,022,171	33.22%	75 / 151	▲29	Sirimavo Bandaranaike	Government
1965	1,221,437	30.18%	41 / 151	▼34	Sirimavo Bandaranaike	Opposition
1970	1,839,979	36.86%	91 / 151	▲50	Sirimavo Bandaranaike	Government
1977	1,855,331	29.72%	8 / 168	▼83	Sirimavo Bandaranaike	Opposition
1989	1,780,599	31.8%	67 / 225	▲59	Sirimavo Bandaranaike	Opposition
1994	Was part of People's Alliance				Chandrika Kumaratunga	Government
2000	Was part of People's Alliance				Chandrika Kumaratunga	Government
2001	Was part of People's Alliance				Chandrika Kumaratunga	Opposition
2004	Was part of United People's Freedom Alliance				Chandrika Kumaratunga	Government
2010	Was part of United People's Freedom Alliance				Mahinda Rajapaksa	Government
2010	Was part of United People's Freedom Alliance				Mahinda Rajapaksa	Opposition (2015)
2015	Was part of United People's Freedom Alliance				Maithripala Sirisena	Government/Opposition (2015–2018) (Note: One faction of the party joined the Government of National Unity led by the United National Party while the other faction sat in the opposition)
2015	Was part of United People's Freedom Alliance				Maithripala Sirisena	Opposition (2018–2019)
2020	Was part of Sri Lanka People's Freedom Alliance				Maithripala Sirisena	Government (2020–2022)
2020	Was part of Sri Lanka People's Freedom Alliance				Maithripala Sirisena	Opposition (since 2022)
2024	Was part of New Democratic Front				Nimal Siripala de Silva	Opposition

== Leadership ==
=== Leaders / Chairpersons ===
No.	Name	Portrait	Period	Tenure	Notes
1	S. W. R. D. Bandaranaike		1951–1959	8 years	Prime Minister of Ceylon (1956–1959); Founder of the party.
2	C. P. de Silva		1959–1960	1 year	Leader of the Opposition (1960)
3	Sirimavo Bandaranaike		1960–1994	34 years	Prime Minister of Sri Lanka (1960–1965, 1970–1977, 1994–2000)
4	Chandrika Kumaratunga		1994–2006	12 years	President of Sri Lanka (1994–2005); Prime Minister of Sri Lanka (1994)
5	Mahinda Rajapaksa		2006–2015	9 years	President of Sri Lanka (2005–2015); Prime Minister of Sri Lanka (2004–2005, 2018, 2019–2022)
6	Maithripala Sirisena		2015–2024	9 years	President of Sri Lanka (2015–2019)
7	Nimal Siripala de Silva		2024–present	1 year	Leader of the Opposition (2015)

=== Deputy Leaders ===
No.	Name	Portrait	Period	Leader	Status
1	Anura Bandaranaike		1982–1993	Sirimavo Bandaranaike	De facto
2	Chandrika Kumaratunga		1993–1994	Sirimavo Bandaranaike	Official

=== General Secretaries ===
- Bernard Aluwihare
- Saravanamuttu Thangarajah
- Badi-ud-din Mahmud
- Patrick de Silva Kularatne
- J. R. P. Suriyapperuma
- Dharmasiri Senanayake (1992–2000)
- S. B. Dissanayake (2000–2001)
- Maithripala Sirisena (2001–2014)
- Anura Priyadharshana Yapa (2014–2015)
- Duminda Dissanayake (2015–2018)
- Rohana Lakshman Piyadasa (2018–2019)
- Dayasiri Jayasekara (2019–2023)
- Dushmantha Mithrapala (acting) (2023–2024)
- Keerthi Udawatte (acting) (2024)
- Duminda Dissanayake (2024–present)

== SLFP Presidents ==
There have been a total of 3 presidents from the Sri Lanka Freedom Party.

#	Portrait	President (birth–death)	Home Province	Took office	Left office	Tenure	Prime Minister (Term)
1		Chandrika Kumaratunga (b. 1945)	Western	12 November 1994	19 November 2005	11 years, 7 days	Sirimavo Bandaranaike (1994–2000)
1		Chandrika Kumaratunga (b. 1945)	Western	12 November 1994	19 November 2005	11 years, 7 days	Ratnasiri Wickremanayake (2000–2001)
1		Chandrika Kumaratunga (b. 1945)	Western	12 November 1994	19 November 2005	11 years, 7 days	Ranil Wickremesinghe (2001–2004)
1		Chandrika Kumaratunga (b. 1945)	Western	12 November 1994	19 November 2005	11 years, 7 days	Mahinda Rajapaksa (2004–2005)
2		Mahinda Rajapaksa (b. 1945)	Southern	19 November 2005	9 January 2015	9 years, 51 days	Ratnasiri Wickremanayake (2005–2010)
2		Mahinda Rajapaksa (b. 1945)	Southern	19 November 2005	9 January 2015	9 years, 51 days	D. M. Jayaratne (2010–2015)
3		Maithripala Sirisena (b. 1951)	North Central	9 January 2015	18 November 2019	4 years, 313 days	Ranil Wickremesinghe (2015–2019)
3		Maithripala Sirisena (b. 1951)	North Central	9 January 2015	18 November 2019	4 years, 313 days	Mahinda Rajapaksa (2018) (disputed)

== Organisation ==
- Sri Lanka Nidahas Bhikku Sanvidanaya
- Sri Lanka Nidahas Indigenous physicians Organization
- Sri Lanka Nidahas Teachers Union
- Sri Lanka Nidahas Farmers' Organization
- Sri Lanka Nidahas Sewaka Sangamaya
- Sri Lanka Nidahas Medical Group
- Sri Lanka Nidahas Students' Organization
- Sri Lanka Nidahas Fishermen and Domestic Industrialists organization
- Sri Lanka Nidahas Cultural Organization
- Sri Lanka Nidahas Lawyers Organization
- Sri Lanka Nidahas Provincial Council members' Association
- Sri Lanka Nidahas Association of members of local authority
- Sri Lanka Nidahas Management Assistant Union
- Sri Lanka Freedom Graduates Association.
- Sri Lanka Freedom development Officer Association.
- Nil Balakaya (officially dissolved after the 2015 presidential elections)

== Publication ==
- Singhale – First SLFP journal in 1956 (founding editor Dharma Sri Kuruppu)
- Dinakara – Newspaper
