= Mapitigama Buddharakkitha =

Mapitigama Buddharakkitha (1921−1967) was the chief conspirator of the assassination of fourth Prime Minister of Ceylon (later Sri Lanka) S. W. R. D. Bandaranaike. From 1947 to 1959, he served as the chief incumbent (chief priest) of the Kelaniya Raja Maha Vihara, one of the most sacred Buddhist temples in Sri Lanka.

== Background ==
Buddharakkitha played an important role in bringing S. W. R. D. Bandaranaike to power in the 1956 parliamentary elections. He was the driving force behind the Eksath Bhikkhu Peramuna or the United Bhikku Front. He has been described as a virtual kingmaker of the time. Later, he attributed Bandaranaike's failure to aggressively pursue the nationalist reforms as the sole motive to assassinate him. But it was revealed that the real motive for the assassination came as a result of the Prime Minister's refusal to award business deals, in particular, a government contract for the construction of a sugar factory and government concessions for a shipping company Buddharakkitha planned to set up. Talduwe Somarama, another Buddhist monk, killed Bandaranaike on 25 September 1959 under the direction of Buddharakkitha.

Buddharakkitha's various notorious acts only surfaced after he was convicted. He was described as a rich businessman who was involved in various high profile businesses. Buddharakkitha routinely consumed whisky, which was an offense for a Buddhist monk. He allegedly had a sexual relationship with Minister of Health Vimala Wijewardene, the only female minister of Bandaranaike's cabinet.

== Aftermath ==
Ironically, the first person to express his anger and sadness over the assassination on Radio Ceylon (the only radio broadcasting service in Sri Lanka at the time) was Mapitigama Buddharakkitha. The Sri Lankan Government called Scotland Yard to undertake extensive investigation of the assassination. Investigations revealed that Buddharakkitha was the mastermind behind the assassination. Subsequent court case sentenced him to death in 1961. The sentence was later changed to one of life imprisonment. He died in 1967 by heart attack following 6 years of hard labour.

== See also ==
- Talduwe Somarama
