= Assassination of S. W. R. D. Bandaranaike =

1959 murder in Colombo, Sri Lanka

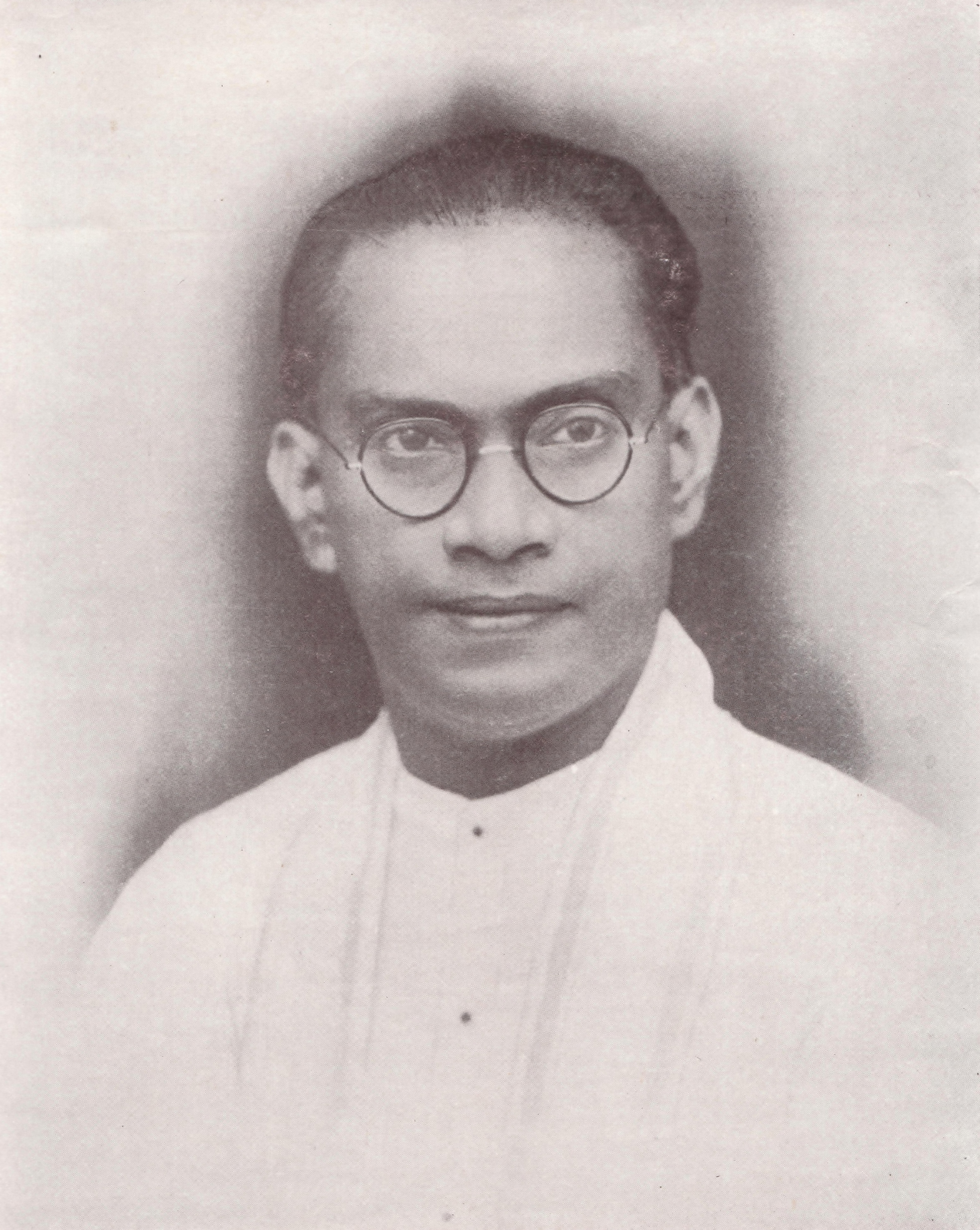
- Official portrait of S.W.R.D. Bandaranayaka
- Location: Tintagel, Rosmead Place, Colombo, Ceylon
- Date: September 25, 1959; 67 years ago 9:45 a.m. (SLST, UTC+5:30)
- Target: S. W. R. D. Bandaranaike
- Attack type: Lone gunman
- Weapon: .45 Webley Mark VI revolver
- Deaths: 1 (S. W. R. D. Bandaranaike)
- Injuries: 1
- Perpetrator: Talduwe Somarama Thero

S. W. R. D. Bandaranaike, the fourth prime minister of Ceylon (now Sri Lanka), was assassinated by the Buddhist priest Talduwe Somarama Thero on September 25, 1959, while meeting the public at his private residence, Tintagel, at Rosmead Place in Colombo. Shot in the chest, abdomen, and hand, Bandaranaike died the following day at Merchant's Ward of the Colombo General Hospital. He was the first Sri Lankan national leader to be assassinated, which led to his widow Sirimavo Bandaranaike (Sirima Ratwatte Dias Bandaranaike) becoming the world's first female prime minister.

== Assassination ==
=== Background ===
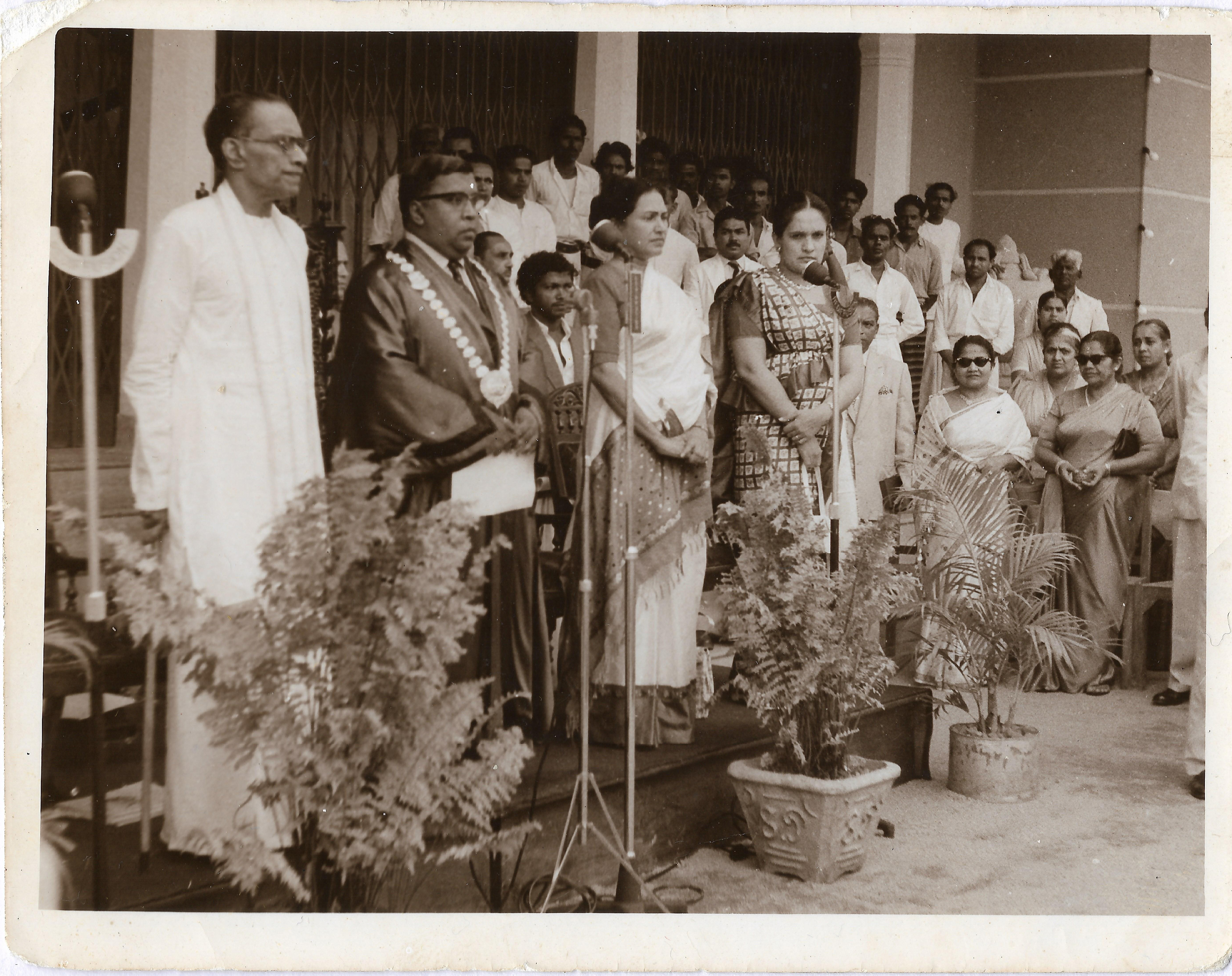
Bandaranaike with Sirimavo and E. L. Senanayake on 23 September 1959 in Kandy, two days before his assassination.

Bandaranaike became prime minister after winning the 1956 elections in a landslide, at the head of a four-party coalition with a no-contest pact with the Lanka Sama Samaja Party and the Communist Party of Sri Lanka known as the Mahajana Eksath Peramuna (MEP) (the Peoples' United Front) which gained a two-thirds majority in parliament on a wave of strong nationalist sentiment.

After becoming prime minister, Bandaranaike officially moved to the prime minister's official residence, Temple Trees. However, he also divided his time between his country seat at Horagolla and his town house, Tintagel, at Rosemead Place in Colombo. On the morning of September 25, 1959, he was at Tintagel and receiving the public to hear their requests and complaints. The prime minister had been assigned a Police Sub Inspector (SI) for his protection. However, Bandaranaike had sent him back because he should attend to more important duties, and requested the Inspector General of Police to assign a few police constables instead. On the morning of September 25, only one armed police constable was on duty at the gates of Tintagel, while the sergeant in charge was not on duty.

=== The assassination ===
==== Shooting at Rosmead Place ====
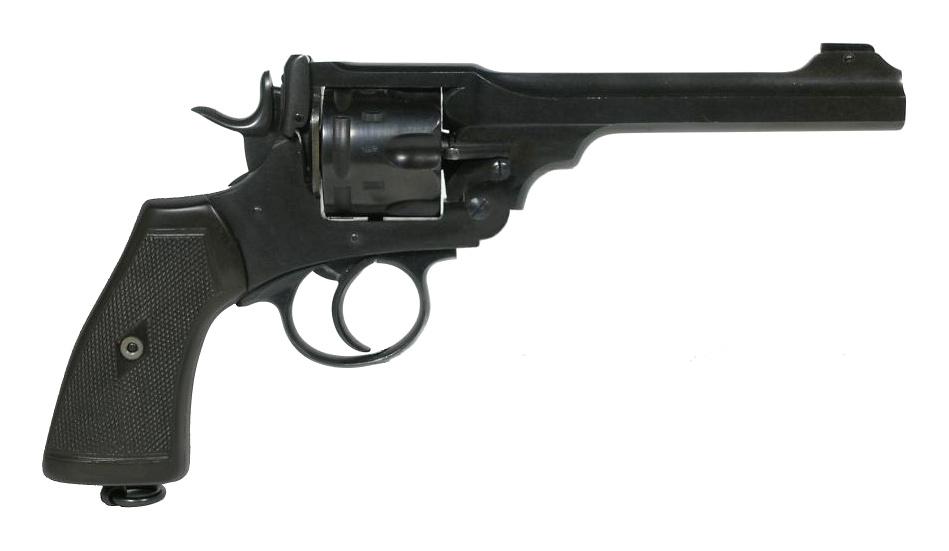
A .45 Webley Mark VI type revolver, similar to the one used by Somarama Thero

Bandaranaike was seated on the front verandah, meeting the public who had come to see him. There were about 20 people inside the verandah and another 40 queued outside. Around 9 AM a Buddhist priest, Talduwe Somarama Thero, who had been waiting to see the prime minister, took a seat in a chair in the verandah and kept a file on a short stool next to his chair. He was a lecturer at the Government College of Ayurveda and had stated that he wanted to meet the prime minister to discuss requirements for the Ayurveda college.

When Somarama Thero was announced, he stood up and approached the prime minister, who in turn also stood and came forward, showing respect to the priest in the customary form. The prime minister asked what he could do for Somarama Thero, who told the prime minister that certain improvements were needed at the Ayurveda College. The prime minister responded that he would get Health Minister A. P. Jayasuriya to attend to the matter if Somarama Thero were to submit the requirement in writing. Around 9.45 AM, Somarama Thero sat down again, and fumbled with the file which he had left on the stool as if to pull out a memorandum, but instead withdrew a .45 Webley Mark VI revolver from his robes and fired twice at point-blank range, hitting Bandaranaike in the chest and abdomen. Bandaranaike made a loud sound and fell down, but got up and tried to stagger back inside the house.

Another priest, Ananda Thero from Polonnaruwa, had been sitting in a chair close by and witnessed the incident. When Ananda Thero got up, Somarama Thero pointed his gun at Ananda Thero. Ananda Thero shouted, and Somarama Thero turned around and followed Bandaranaike, shooting at him wildly. Somarama Thero fired four more shots, emptying the chambers of the revolver. One bullet hit Bandaranaike's hand and another hit a school teacher who had come to see the prime minister. The two other shots hit a glass pane on a door and a flower pot, breaking it.

Confusion and commotion had broken out, and the police constable on duty at the gate came running in, having been alerted by the sound of gunshots before Ananda Thero came out shouting that the prime minister had been shot. The police constable fired at Somarama Thero, wounding him in the groin. Somarama Thero was quickly surrounded and overpowered. Bandaranaike ordered restraint and mercy towards Somarama Thero, who was arrested and taken to the Harbour Police Station under armed guard while the prime minister was rushed to the Colombo General Hospital.

==== Aftermath ====
"a foolish man dressed in the robes of a monk"

— S. W. R. D. Bandaranaike

When news of the assassination attempt reached parliament, which was in session, Education Minister Wijeyananda Dahanayake requested an adjournment, but a majority of members disagreed. However, many soon left to inquire about the prime minister.

The Governor General, Sir Oliver Goonetilleke, was at Queen's House accepting letters of credence from the Italian ambassador, Count Paolo di Michelis di Sloughhello. When he was informed about the assassination attempt, Goonetilleke stopped the ceremony and rushed to Rosmead Place. He instructed parliament to continue, and at 11 AM he declared a state of emergency, bringing the military to full readiness and mobilizing reserves.

==== Death of Bandaranaike ====
Bandaranaike underwent five hours of surgery, which was conducted by Dr. M. V. P. Peries, Dr. P. R. Anthonis, Dr. L. O. Silva, and Dr. Noel Bartholomeusz, before being transferred to the Merchant's Ward. He regained consciousness and requested clemency towards the gunman, and dictated a message to the nation. However, his condition deteriorated overnight, and he died twenty-two hours after he was shot. The inquest, conducted by Colombo Coroner J. N. C. Tiruchelvam, JP, UM, recorded that the death was "due to shock and haemorrhage resulting from multiple injuries to the thoracic and abdominal organs".

Bandaranaike had been scheduled to go to New York to address the United Nations General Assembly in late September 1959. The Leader of the House, C. P. de Silva, was in London undergoing medical treatment, having fallen ill after consuming a glass of milk at a cabinet meeting. As a result, Bandaranaike sent a letter to the governor general recommending that he appoint Wijeyananda Dahanayake, the minister of education, as acting prime minister during his absence. Sir Oliver Goonetilleke appointed Dahanayake on September 26, 1959. The appointment was later confirmed by Parliament.

== Funeral ==
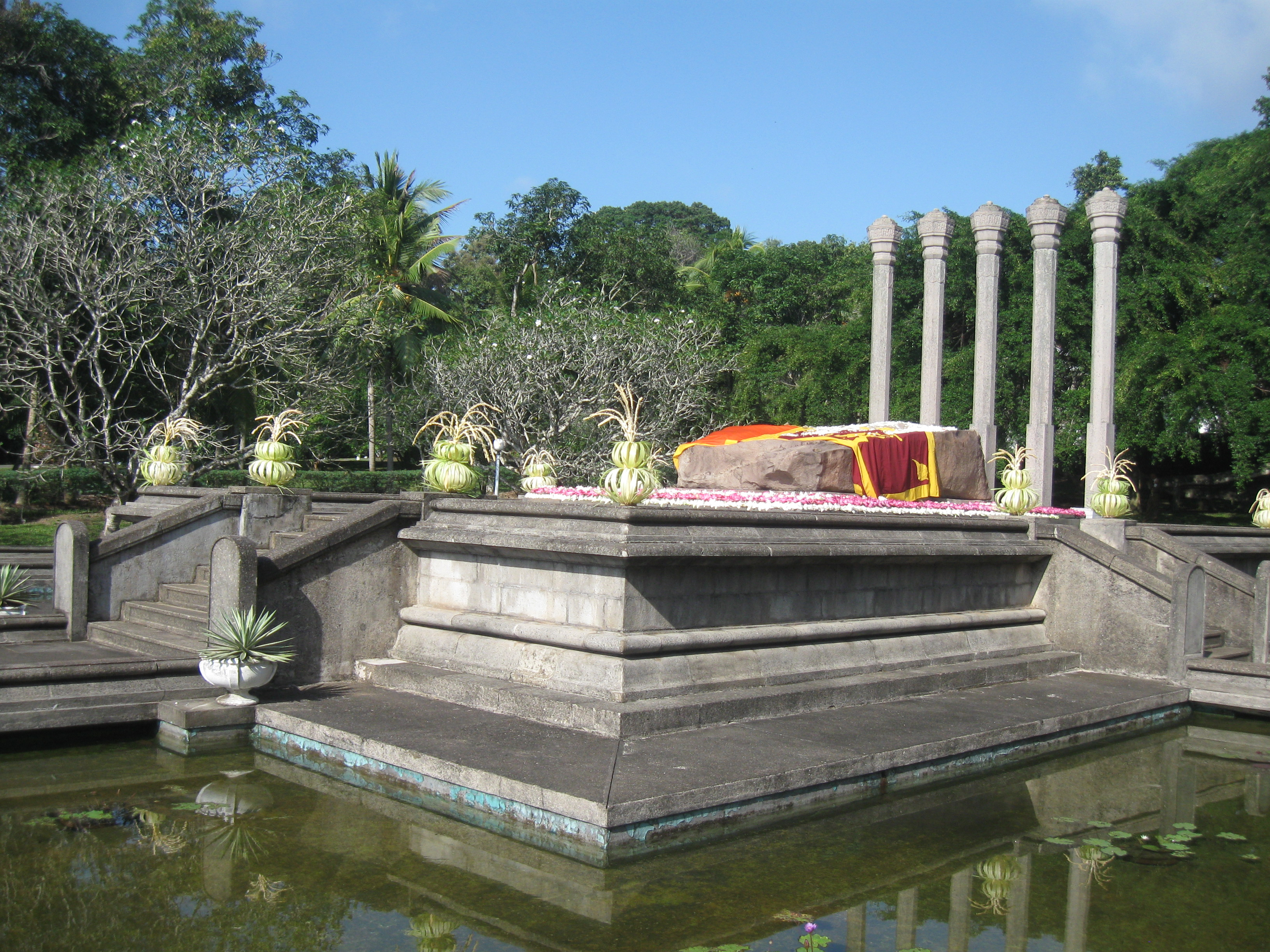
Bandaranaike Samadhi (where S. W. R. D. Bandaranaike was entombed) at Horagolla, Sri Lanka

Following the inquiry proceedings, Bandaranaike's body was taken to the Parliament building at Galle Face to lie in state for two days. Thousands came, day and night, to pay their respects. On the third day, the remains were moved to Horagolla, where the funeral took place amid a sea of mourners. Like his father, Sir Solomon Dias Bandaranaike, S. W. R. D. Bandaranaike was interred in a specially built mausoleum known as the Horagolla Bandaranaike Samadhi.

== Official investigations ==
=== Police investigation ===
With Somarama Thero in custody, the police started an intensive investigation with a team composed of DIG (CID) D.C.T. Pate, SP Rajasooriya, ASP K. Iye, IP Abeywardena, IP A.M. Seneviratne and IP Tyrell Goonetilleke, with detectives from Scotland Yard arriving to assist.

=== Arrests ===
Multiple arrests were made in connection with the assassination. The arrest of Mapitigama Buddharakkitha Thero, the chief priest of the Kelaniya Raja Maha Vihara, put prime minister Dahanayake in a difficult position; Dahanayake had, soon after the assassination, arranged for Buddharakkitha to attend Temple Trees to address the nation on Radio Ceylon regarding Bandaranaike. Following his arrest, Vimala Wijewardene, then Minister of Local Government, came under pressure to resign. She refused, and was removed from office by Prime Minister Dahanayake. She was arrested on November 21. The arrest of Buddharakkitha's associate, H.P. Jayawardena, led to rumors that J. R. Jayewardene was part of the assassination plot. F.R. de Zoysa, a businessman, was arrested, and his brother Stanley de Zoysa, Minister of Finance, was obliged to resign on 23 November. Another brother, Deputy Inspector General of Police Sydney de Zoysa, was placed on compulsory leave. Newton Perera, Inspector of Colpetty Police Administration, was arrested, as was Ossie Corea, a former excise inspector turned underworld kingpin; Corea had worked as a bodyguard for Stanley de Zoysa. The preliminary inquiry found that Vimala Wijewardene had been falsely accused, but the stigma attached to the charges effectively ended her political career. F.R. de Zoysa and Ossie Corea were later released; however the investigation found that the murder weapon had belonged to Ossie Corea, and that Newton Perera had provided weapons training to Talduwe Somarama Thero.

=== Magisterial inquiry ===
November 26, 1959, seven persons were charged in the Chief Magistrate's Court of Colombo on a charge of conspiring to murder S.W.R.D. Bandaranaike. They were:

- Mapitigama Buddharakkitha Thero
- Hemachandra Piyasena Jayawardene
- Pallihakarage Anura de Silva
- Talduwe Somarama Thero
- Weerasooriya Arachchige Newton Perera
- Vimala Wijewardene
- Amerasinghe Arachchige Carolis Amerasinghe

Somarama Thero was also charged with committing the murder. He had confessed to the murder in his statements to the police and to the chief magistrate, but later changed his plea at the Supreme Court trial. During the magisterial inquiry, Amerasinghe, who was a Kolonnawa Urban Councillor, became a crown witness and received a pardon. Vimala Wijewardene was cleared of all charges, but the stigma attached to the case effectively ended her political career.

The magisterial inquiry was conducted by N.A. de S. Wijesekara, Chief Magistrate of Colombo, and lasted 124 days, with 193 witnesses testifying. Wijesekara committed five of the accused to stand trial before the Supreme Court: Buddharakkitha Thero, Jayewardena, Anura de Silva, Somarama Thero and Newton Perera. Although a postmortem examination of Bandaranaike's body was not conducted, Dr P. R. Anthonis recounted the injuries and gave the cause of death.

== Cause for the assassination ==
The investigation claimed that the reason behind the murder of Bandaranaike was Bandaranaike's refusal to entertain Buddharakitha Thero's requests following his support for Bandaranaike in the election. Buddharakitha supported Bandaranaike's campaign with funds and influence. Following the election, Buddharakitha approached Bandaranaike to secure a lucrative shipping contract to import rice from Burma and Thailand for a company named Colombo Shipping Lines which he had co-founded with his associate H.P. Jayawardena. Bandaranaike on advice of his Ministers Philip Gunawardena and R.G. Senanayake gave the contract to the government-owned Ceylon Shipping Corporation. Bandaranaike further denied a lucrative sugar manufacturing licence to Buddharakitha and Jayawardena on advice of the two ministers.

== Prosecution and punishment ==
=== Supreme court trial ===
The Supreme Court trial of the five accused commenced on February 22, 1961, before Justice T. S. Fernando, QC, OBE. With a seven-member English speaking jury, D.W.L. Lieversz Snr. serving as foreman. 97 witnesses testified and were cross examined. The prosecution was led by the Solicitor General A. C. Alles and Deputy Solicitor General A. C. M. Ameer assisted by Senior Crown Counsels R.S. Wanasundara and R.I. Obeyesekera.

The first and second accused, Buddharakitha Thero and Jayawardene were represented by Phineas Quass, QC from Britain. The third accused Anura de Silva was represented by Kenneth Shinya assisted by K. Ratnesar. The fourth accused Somarama Thero was represented by Lucian G. Weeramantry appearing free of charge. The fifth accused Newton Perera was represented by N. Satyendra assisted by A. Mahesan.

==== Verdict ====
The trial concluded on May 12, 1961 and the jury returned its verdict in five days. The jury acquitted Anura de Silva (unanimously) and Newton Perera (five to two). The jury found first accused Buddharakkitha Thero, second accused HP Jayewardena and fourth accused Somarama Thero guilty by a unanimous verdict and pronounced on all three of them the death sentence (death by hanging).

=== Capital punishment ===
S. W. R. D. Bandaranaike's administration enacted the Suspension of the Capital Punishment Act No 20 of 1958, which suspended the death penalty from May 1958. Following the Bandaranaike assassination, Dahanayake government attempted to revive the death penalty and within a week of the assassination a gazette extraordinary proclamation dated October 2, 1959, re-introduced the death penalty. This was followed by the Capital Punishment (Repeal) Act which was quickly passed in parliament and became law on December 7, 1959. It was passed with retrospective effect, aimed at inflicting the death penalty on those responsible for the assassination that happened on September 26. However, a loophole in the law allowed Buddharakkita and Jayewardene to evade the death penalty as the Capital Punishment (Repeal) Act allowed for a sentence of death for a person convicted of murder committed prior to December 2, 1959 and not for the offence of conspiracy to commit murder.

=== Court of Criminal Appeal ===
An appeal was made by all three convicts to the then Court of Criminal Appeal which consisted of a five Judge bench with the chief justice Hema Basnayake, QC presiding and Justices M.C. Sansoni, H.N.G. Fernando, N. Sinnetamby and L.B. de Silva. George E. Chitty, QC of the unofficial bar was retained by the government to lead the prosecution assisted by L.B.T. Premaratne, QC and Crown Counsel Ananda Pereira. Deputy Solicitor General Ameer opposed this move and resigned in protest. E. B. Wikramanayake, QC argued that the Capital Punishment (Repeal) Act did not re-introduce the death penalty for conspiracy to commit murder. The court agreed with the submission. All appeals were dismissed but amended the sentences imposed on Buddharakkitha Thero and Jayewardena from death to rigorous life imprisonment.

=== Capital Punishment (Special Provisions) Bill ===
"a barbarous bill amounted to murder by statute"

— Dr Colvin R. de Silva

By this time S. W. R. D. Bandaranaike's widow Sirima Bandaranaike had formed a government and was prime minister. Angered by the decision of the Appeal Court, the government drafted a new bill. On behalf of the government C.P. de Silva who was the leader of the house on January 18, 1962 presented the Capital Punishment (Special Provisions) Bill. The bill stated specifically that with regard to the Bandaranaike assassination, provision was made for the execution of those convicted for murder and conspiracy to murder the former prime minister. It rendered null and void the Appeal courts decision to alter death sentence to life imprisonment for those guilty of conspiracy. The bill drew loud protests and outcry, with Dr Colvin R. de Silva stating that the bill was "a barbarous bill amounted to murder by statute". The government faced with widespread opposition withdrew the bill on January 25, on the pretext that an appeal to the Privy Council was in progress.

=== Appeal to the Privy Council ===
All the convicted persons made an appeal to the Judicial Committee of the Privy Council, which were refused by an order of the Privy Council in May 1962. Sir Dingle Foot QC, appeared on an honorary basis for Somarama Thero. Newton Perera, who was accused of procuring the murder weapon, a .45 Webley Mark VI revolver and ammunition, as well as providing weapons training to Somarama was acquitted of murder by the Privy Council. However, following his release from remand prison, he was served with a charge sheet by the police and was found guilty of all. He was thereafter dismissed from the police.

=== Punishment of convicted ===
==== Execution ====
Talduwe Somarama Thero thanked his counsel Weeramanthri in open court and later converted to Christianity and was baptized in his cell by the Anglican priest Father Mathew Pieris. He was hanged in the gallows at the Welikada Prison on July 6, 1962. He was 48 years old. The hanging was undertaken by state executioner Lewis Singho and his assistant Subatheris Appu.

==== Imprisonment ====
On May 7, 1966, acting on the advice of the minister of justice of Dudley Senanayake's government, the governor general commuted the life imprisonment sentences of Buddharakkitha Thero and Jayewardena to 20 years. Buddharakkitha Thero died in 1967 of a heart ailment aged 46 years after having served time at Welikada prison for 7½ years of his sentence. Hemachandra Piyasena Jayewardena served 17½ years of his sentence and was released on August 4, 1977.

==== Commission of inquiry ====
Sirima Bandaranaike in 1963 appointed a commission of inquiry under the Commission of Inquiry Act of 1948 to inquire into the political aspects of the Bandaranaike assassination. The commission consisted of Justice T. S. Fernando, Justice Abdel Younis from Egypt and Justice G.C. Mills-Odoi from Ghana. Commission received the services of Solicitor General A. C. Alles and Crown Counsels R.S. Wanasundara and R.I. Obeyesekera. W. Dahanayake, Lionel Goonetilleke (former assistant superintendent of Police, CID), Ossie Corea, F.R. "Dickie" de Zoysa, Vimala Wijewardene and Sydney de Zoysa were called to appear before the commission. The commission released a report as Sessional Paper III of 1964; with adverse finding of only former Minister Vimala Wijewardene.

== Conspiracy theories ==
Many conspiracy theories posit that the assassination involved people or organizations in addition to those accused and convicted. One of the major conspiracies are that the murder was carried out by Ossie Corea an underworld kingpin who was imposing as Talduwe Somarama Thero. Others claim that then Minister Stanley de Zoysa was an accomplice in the murder and his brother Sydney de Zoysa, Deputy Inspector General of Police of Range II had attempted to have Talduwe Somarama Thero killed soon after the prime minister was shot.

== Reaction to the assassination ==
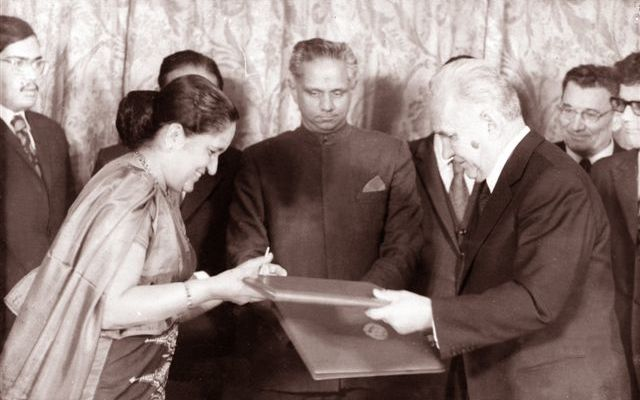
Bandaranaike's wife Sirimavo Bandaranaike made history by becoming the world's first woman prime minister. She is seen here with the then Soviet Premier, Alexei Kosygin.

The assassination evoked stunned reactions nationally and worldwide. It led to a period of political instability where the caretaker government of Dahanayake lasted only one year and following an in-divisive elections in March 1960 when Dudley Senanayake formed a government for a brief period. Bandaranaike's party the Sri Lanka Freedom Party selected his widow Sirima Bandaranaike as the leader of the party. She became the world's first female prime minister when another coalition led by the SLFP won elections in July 1960.

== Artifacts, museums and locations today ==
The murder weapon, the fatal bullet and the clothing worn by Bandaranaike on that day are on display at the National Museum of Colombo. Tintagel remained the private residence of the Bandaranaike family until it was converted into a hotel in 2010.
