= Mahajana Eksath Peramuna (1956) =

People's United Front මහජන එක්සත් පෙරමුණ Mahajana Eksath Peramuna
- Leader: S. W. R. D. Bandaranaike
- Founder: S. W. R. D. Bandaranaike
- Founded: 1956
- Dissolved: 1959
- Ideology: Democratic socialism Sinhalese Buddhist nationalism Left-wing nationalism Left-wing populism
- Political position: Left-wing
- Religion: Theravada Buddhism

Election symbol
- Hand

The Mahajana Eksath Peramuna (People's United Front) was electoral alliance founded in 1956. It consisted of the Sri Lanka Freedom Party led by S. W. R. D. Bandaranaike, Viplavakari Lanka Sama Samaja Party led by Philip Gunawardena and Sinhala Bhasha Peramuna (Sinhala Language Front) led by Wijeyananda Dahanayake and I.M.R.A. Iriyagolla (Independents)

The alliance won the 1956 elections and formed the government.

The MEP alliance fell apart Mr I.M.R.A. Iriyagolle resigned and joined the opposition, in 1957, May 1959 after Philip Gunawardena and William de Silva resigned from the government. The VLSSP joined the opposition.

The Mahajana Eksath Peramuna name was carried forward by Philip Gunawardena who founded a new political party called Mahajana Eksath Peramuna in 1959.

== Electoral history ==
Sri Lanka Parliamentary Elections
Election year	Votes	Vote %	Seats won	+/–	Government
1956	1,046,277	39.52%	51 / 95	Steady	Government
