= Talduwe Somarama =

Sri Lankan Buddhist monk; murderer of Prime Minister Bandaranaike (1959)

Talduwe Somarama Thero
- Born: Talduwe Ratugama Rallage Weris Singho; 27 August 1915
- Died: 6 July 1962 (aged 46); Welikada Prison, Western Province, Ceylon
- Status: Executed by hanging
- Criminal charges: Murder (assassination of S. W. R. D. Bandaranaike)
- Penalty: Death by hanging

Talduwe Ratugama Rallage Weris Singho, better known as Talduwe Somarama Thero (27 August 1915 – 6 July 1962) was a Ceylonese Buddhist priest who shot and killed S. W. R. D. Bandaranaike, the fourth prime minister of Ceylon (later Sri Lanka) in 1959.

== Early life ==
Somarama Thero was born on 27 August 1915, to Iso Hamy and Ratugama Rallage Dieris Appuhamy. He was robed when he was 14 on 20 January 1929, and received his schooling at Talduwa Ihala School. He allegedly received his higher ordination as a Thero (Buddhist monk) in Kandy on 25 June 1936.

== The assassination ==
Allegedly drafted into the conspiracy by Mapitigama Buddharakkitha, the chief incumbent of the Kelaniya Raja Maha Vihara, Somarama reluctantly consented to assassinate the prime minister "for the greater good of his country, race and religion". Buddharakkitha attributed Bandaranaike's failure to aggressively pursue the nationalist reforms as the motive to eliminate him. Others attributed the assassin's motives to his obligation to Buddharakkitha, together with Prime Minister Bandaranaike's delay in fulfilling his campaign promises to Buddhism.

The date was set for 25 September 1959, when Somarama was to visit Bandaranaike at his home and shoot him at point-blank range. His saffron robes gave him free access to Tintagel, the private residence of Bandaranaike, in Rosmead Place, Colombo. As the prime minister commenced his routine meetings with the public, Somarama waited patiently for his turn. When the monk's presence was announced to him, Bandaranaike rose to greet him in the traditional Buddhist manner. The assassin then pulled out a revolver hidden in his robes and fired at the prostrate prime minister. Somarama was injured in firing between himself and the prime minister's bodyguards. Prime Minister Bandaranaike succumbed to his wounds the following day.

Somarama then faced trial, along with four other involved in the conspiracy. It was a hopeless case, and in spite of a resourceful defense the jury unanimously found Somarama guilty of the capital offense. Before sentencing him to death, the trial judge, Justice T. S. Fernando, QC, CBE, told Somarama he had a "streak of conscience as he did not attend court in his saffron robes." The chief conspirator, Mapitigama Buddharakkitha and H. P. Jayawardena, a businessman closely associated with him, were found guilty of conspiracy to murder. Bandaranaike had suspended capital punishment, but after his death the government had it restored. In an apparent blunder by the draftsman, the law re-establishing the death penalty failed to include conspiracy to murder. As a consequence, while Somarama would be hanged, the two chief conspirators escaped with life sentences.

Somarama was hanged at Welikada Prison on 6 July 1962. He gave up his robes a fortnight before his hanging and, two days before his execution, was baptized as a Christian by an Anglican priest.
