= 1956 Ceylonese parliamentary election =

Sri Lankan government elections

- 5–10 April 1956

95 seats to the House of Representatives of Ceylon 48 seats were needed for a majority
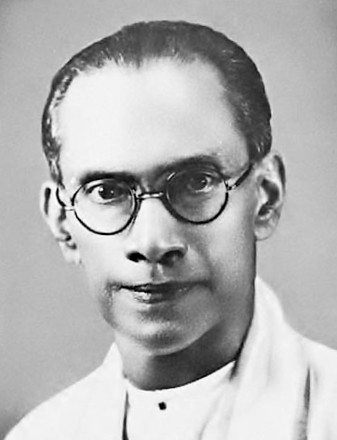

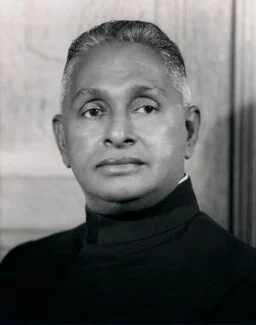
	First party	Second party
Leader	S. W. R. D. Bandaranaike	N. M. Perera
Party	MEP	LSSP
Leader since	1956	1945
Leader's seat	Attanagalla	Ruwanwella
Last election	15.52%, 9 seats (Note: As the Sri Lanka Freedom Party)	13.11%, 9 seats
Seats won	51	14
Seat change	▲42	▲5
Popular vote	1,046,277	274,204
Percentage	39.52%	10.36%
Swing	▲24.00pp	▼2.75pp
	Third party	Fourth party
Leader	S. J. V. Chelvanayakam	John Kotelawala
Party	ITAK	UNP
Leader since	1949	1953
Leader's seat	Kankesanthurai	Dodangaslanda
Last election	1.95%, 2 seats	44.08%, 54 seats
Seats won	10	8
Seat change	▲8	▼46
Popular vote	142,758	738,810
Percentage	5.39%	27.91%
Swing	▲3.44pp	▼16.17pp
Prime Minister before election
John Kotelawala
UNP
Prime Minister after election
S. W. R. D. Bandaranaike
MEP

Parliamentary elections were held in Ceylon in 1956. They were a watershed in the country's political history, and were the first elections fought to realistically challenge the ruling United National Party. Former Leader of the House S. W. R. D. Bandaranaike crossed over to the opposition to form the Sri Lanka Freedom Party to launch his bid for Prime Minister. The party won the election with 51 seats, winning a majority in the house.

== Background ==
The UNP government of John Kotelawala had been rapidly losing steam. It faced widespread criticism over Ceylon's poor economic performance. Meanwhile, the Sri Lanka Freedom Party now championed a popular socialist platform, calling for English to be replaced by Sinhala as the island's official language.

The UNP resisted this out of deference to Ceylon's Tamil minority, but changed its position in early 1956. This only served to cost the UNP its Tamil support while gaining it little among the Sinhalese.

The Lanka Sama Samaja Party and the Communist Party campaigned for parity of status between Sinhala and Tamil, with both to jointly replace English as the official language.

The Tamil parties campaigned to keep English as the official language.

SLFP leader S. W. R. D. Bandaranaike assembled a coalition with a group of small Marxist parties to form the Mahajana Eksath Peramuna.

== Results ==
Bandaranaike's coalition obtained a solid majority government and he became prime minister.

Party	Votes	%	Seats
Mahajana Eksath Peramuna (Note: Including the Sinhala Language Front, the Sri Lanka Freedom Party and the Viplavakari Lanka Sama Samaja Party.)	1,046,277	39.52	51
United National Party	738,810	27.91	8
Lanka Sama Samaja Party	274,204	10.36	14
Illankai Tamil Arasu Kachchi	142,758	5.39	10
Communist Party of Ceylon	119,715	4.52	3
Tamil Speaking Front	26,170	0.99	1
Ceylon Labour Party	18,033	0.68	0
All Ceylon Tamil Congress	8,914	0.34	1
Tamil Resistance Front	7,931	0.30	1
Others and independents	264,435	9.99	6
Total	2,647,247	100.00	95
Total votes	2,391,538	–	
Registered voters/turnout	3,464,159	69.04	
Source: Report on the Sixth Parliamentary General Election of Ceylon

== Legacy ==
The SLFP campaign of 1956 was the first in Ceylon's history where communal feelings against the minority Tamil community were deliberately stirred up by Sinhalese politicians for electoral gain. The SLFP tried to blame the high unemployment Sinhalese youth faced on the Tamils and in effect promised not to correct injustices but to openly discriminate against Tamils via a policy of official unilingualism.

The hard feelings from this campaign contributed towards the eruption, nearly three decades later, of the path to civil war.

However, it also changed the character of politics in the country from the elitism that had characterised it hitherto. Members of Parliament from other parties than the Left were middle class, working class or farmers. Henceforth electorates were addressed in their mother tongue at election meetings (as the LSSP and CP had done from inception) instead of English.
