= Horagolla Walauwa =

- හොරගොල්ල වලව්ව
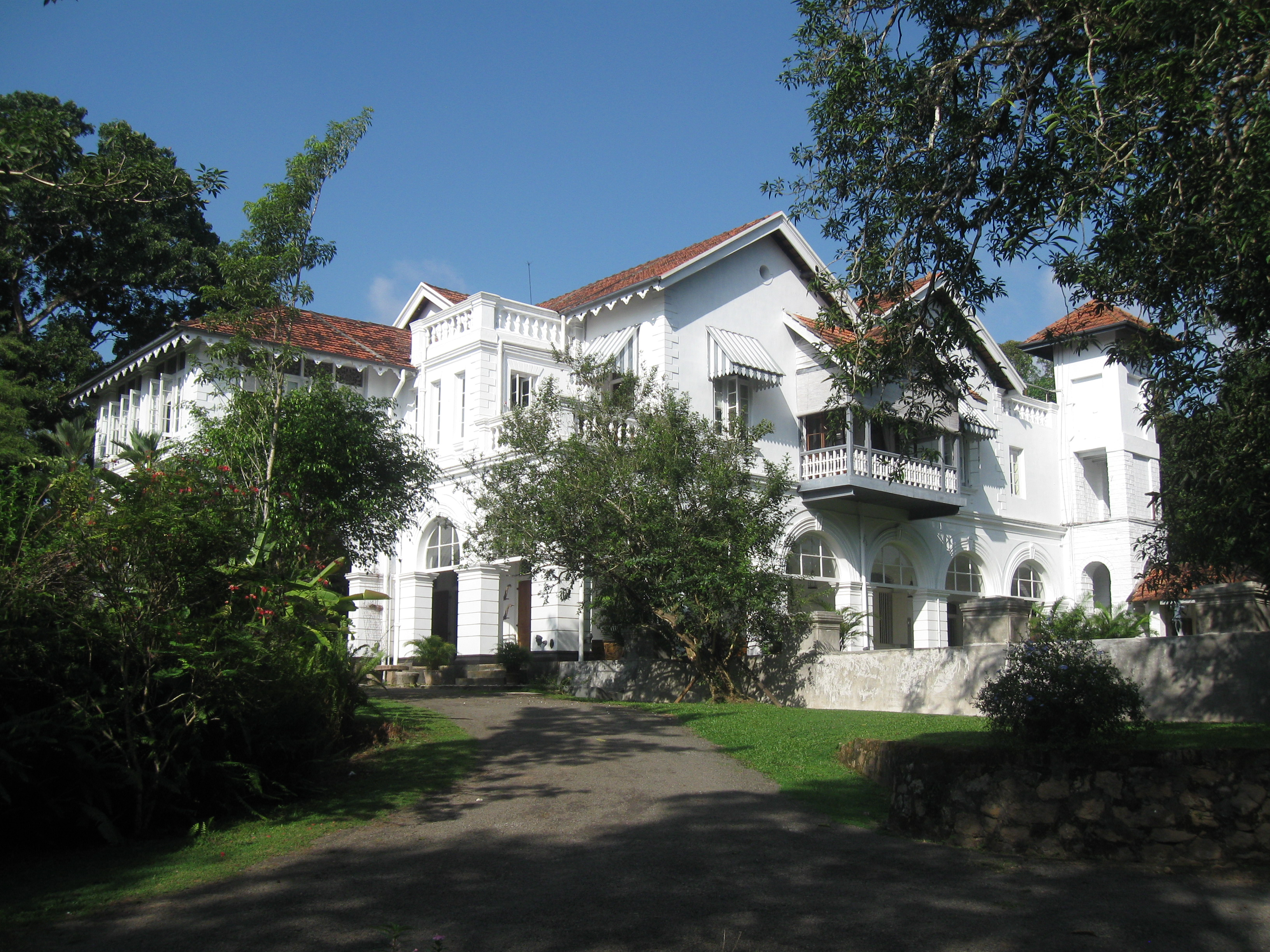
- Horagolla Walauwa, Atthanagalla

General information
- Classification: Bungalow/Walauwa
- Location: Horagolla, Nittambuwa Sri Lanka
- Inaugurated: 1820
- Client: Sir Solomon Dias Bandaranaike
- Owner: Anura Bandaranaike Foundation

Horagolla Walauwa (also known as Horagolla) is a large bungalow (as mansions are referred to locally) in Atthanagalla, Western Province, Sri Lanka.

A stately home built by Sir Solomon Dias Bandaranaike after his appointment as Maha Mudaliyar (Head Mudaliyar) at the turn of the twentieth century. It drives its name from his country seat of Horagolla, where it is located, and from the word walauwa the traditional name for a headman's home.

Located behind it is the older walauwa of Horagolla which was home to Sir Solomon's father Gate Mudaliyar Don Christoffel Henricus Dias Abeywickrema Jayatilake Seneviratne Bandaranaike, which was originally built by Don Solomon Dias Bandaranaike, Mudaliyar of Siyan Korale East who was Sir Solomon's grandfather who helped the British build the Colombo - Kandy Road. A passionate horse breeder, Sir Solomon converted this house into his stables. After many years of dereliction, it was renovated by the renowned architect Geoffrey Bawa as the home of Sir Solomon's granddaughter Sunethra Bandaranaike in the 1980s.

Horagolla Walauwa, became the family seat of the Bandaranaike family with Sir Solomon's son S. W. R. D. Bandaranaike becoming the 4th Prime Minister of Ceylon after independence followed by his daughter-in-law Sirimavo Ratwatte Dias Bandaranaike becoming prime minister on three occasions and his granddaughter Chandrika Kumaratunga becoming Prime Minister and then President of Sri Lanka.

Located in the gardens of Horagolla Walauwa, east of the Walauwa is the Horagolla Bandaranaike Samadhi the mausoleum of S. W. R. D. Bandaranaike and Sirimavo Bandaranaike and across the Colombo-Kandy road on top of a short hill is the mausoleum of Sir Solomon. After the death of Sirimavo Bandaranaike, the house was inherited by her son Anura Bandaranaike who was a former Government Minister and Speaker of the Parliament of Sri Lanka. After he died without heirs it was transferred to the Anura Bandaranaike Foundation.

== See also ==
- Bandaranaike family
