= Sam Wijesinha =

Sri Lankan politician (1921–2014)

- සෑම් විජේසිංහ சாம் விஜேசிங்க
- Sam Wijesinha in the 1970s

Parliamentary Commissioner for Administration for Sri Lanka
- In office 7 September 1981 – 31 July 1991
- Preceded by: order created
- Succeeded by: L. H. De Alwis

Secretary General of Parliament
- In office 7 September 1978 – 31 July 1981
- Preceded by: order created
- Succeeded by: S. N. Seneviratne

Secretary to the National State Assembly
- In office 22 May 1972 – 7 September 1978
- Preceded by: order created
- Succeeded by: order abolished

Clerk to the House of Representatives
- In office 27 October 1964 – 22 May 1972
- Preceded by: R. St. L. P. Deraniyagala
- Succeeded by: order abolished

Crown Counsel to the Ceylon Attorney General's Department
- In office 1948–1964

Personal details
- Born: Samson Senapala Samarakone Wijesinha; 27 June 1921 Getamanna, Sri Lanka
- Died: 31 August 2014 (aged 93) Colombo, Sri Lanka
- Resting place: Kanatte Cemetery, Colombo, Sri Lanka
- Spouse: Mukta Wickremesinghe
- Relations: Wijesinha family
- Children: Sanjiva; Anila; Rajiva
- Parent: Don Aelias Wijesinha (father)
- Education: S. Thomas' College, Mount Lavinia, University of London
- Occupation: Politics
- Profession: Lawyer
- Awards: Sri Lanka Journalism Awards for Excellence – Sepala Gunasena Award for Courageous Journalism in the Defence of Press Freedom in Sri Lanka; 2013

Samson Senapala Samarakoon Wijesinha (Note: Sinhala: සැම්සන් සේනපාල සමරකෝන් විජේසිංහ; Tamil: சாம்சன் சோமபால சமரகோன் விஜேசிங்க; UK: /sˈamsən sˌɛne͡ɪpˈɑːlə sˌamɐɹɐkˈuːn wˈa͡ɪd͡ʒsɪnhə/) (27 June 1921 – 31 August 2014) was a Sri Lankan politician who assumed the role of Clerk to the House of Representatives from 1964 to 1972 and Secretary General of Parliament from 1978 to 1981. A Crown Counsel to the Attorney General's Department of Ceylon from 1948 to 1964, he was also the Parliamentary Commissioner for Administration for Sri Lanka from 1981 to 1991.

== Early life and education ==
Samson Senapala Samarakoon Wijesinha was born in Getamanna, a small town in Hambantota District on 27 June 1921 to Don Aelias Wijesinha. He had three older sisters and two older brothers, each sibling four years older than the next. He was a direct descendant of the first Head Mudaliyar of Portuguese Ceylon, Don Diaz Abeysundere Samarakone.

Wijesinha first attended Rahula College, Matara, then received higher education at Ananda College, Colombo and S. Thomas' College, Mount Lavinia. After graduating at the University of London with a Bachelor of Arts in 1944, Wijesinha started his legal education at the Ceylon Law College, where he became a barrister in law. Thereafter, he furthered his studies at McGill University and got a LL.M. in Aviation Law.

== Legal and political career ==
In 1948, Wijesinha was appointed as Crown Counsel to the Attorney General's Department until 1964, when he assumed the role of Clerk to the House of Representatives.

In 1965, Wijesinha served as the secretary for the Ceylonese delegation to the 11th Commonwealth Parliamentary Conference in Wellington, New Zealand, led by the Parliamentary Secretary to the Cabinet MInister of State, D. P. Atapattu.

When Ceylon became independent from the British Empire as Sri Lanka, Wijesinha helped draft the 1972 constitution. He became the Secretary to the 1st and 2nd National State Assembly from 22 May 1972 to 7 September 1978. Thereafter, he was appointed the Secretary General of Parliament in 1978, and oversaw the legislative efforts that reshaped Sri Lanka's democracy.

In 1981, Wijesinha retired from Parliament. He then served as the Parliamentary Commissioner for Administration for Sri Lanka until 1991, before retiring once again. Wijesinha was later offered to become High Commissioner to the UK by President Ranasinghe Premadasa and Ambassador to Japan, but he declined mainly because he did not want to leave the country with his wife.

== Later years ==
In 2013, Wijesinha was awarded the prestigious Sepala Gunasena Award for Courageous Journalism in the Defence of Press Freedom in Sri Lanka by the Editors' Guild of Sri Lanka.

On the evening of 31 August 2014, Wijesinha died at his house, Lakmahal, in Colombo, Sri Lanka. He was buried at the Kanatte Cemetery the evening after.

== Personal life ==
During the 1941 Royal–Thomian Cricket Encounter, Wijesinha met and became friends with Mukta Wickremesinghe, the only sister of Esmond Wickremesinghe and Lakshman Wickremesinghe. They married in 1948 and had three children: Sanjiva, Anila and Rajiva.

== Legacy ==
On 18 March 2012, President Mahinda Rajapaksa and Leader of the Opposition Ranil Wickremesinghe both wrote an article in The Sunday Times Plus Section, titled: "Lasting Links from the Giruwa Pattuwa" and "Sam Mama's Parliament" respectively. Rajapaksa wrote about Wijesinha's roles and his friendship with Rajapaksa's father, D. A. Rajapaksa; Wickremesinghe wrote about the 'Sunday lunches' with Wijesinha's family and the knowledge he got from him.

In c. 2020, Anila's daughter Anisha Dias Bandaranaike established the Lakmahal Community Library in Wijesinha's house. She told Roar Media, then a news publisher, (Note: Roar Media became a content production studio in 2024.) that the establishment of the library was mainly due to her grandfather's love for reading and writing books.
