= Socialism in Sri Lanka =

Socialism in Sri Lanka, or Sri Lankan socialism is a political philosophy that is shared by various political parties of the country. Socialist parties, especially the Trotskyist Lanka Sama Samaja Party, have played a major role in the country's history from the time of the Sri Lankan Independence movement. Socialist ideology shaped the principal economic and social policies of Sirimavo Bandaranaike and the Sri Lanka Freedom Party during the 1970s.

Several sectors of the economy including banking, insurance and some privately owned estates were nationalized during her tenure. Bread and several essential items were rationed by the government at the time.

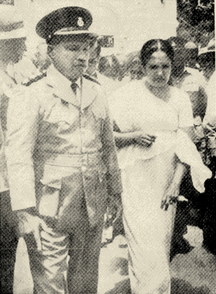
Bandaranaike and her military escort, pictured in 1961

== Janatha Vimukthi Peramuna ==
Janatha Vimukthi Peramuna is a communist and Marxist–Leninist party and political movement in Sri Lanka. The movement was involved in two armed uprisings in Sri Lanka; however they entered into the democratic process in 1994.

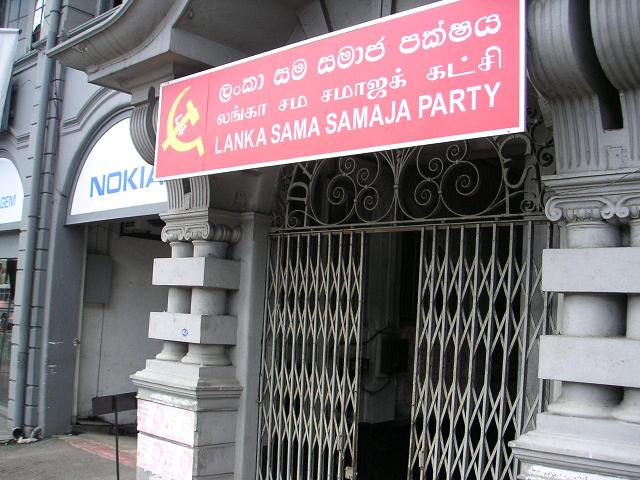
Lanka Sama Samaja Party main office in Colombo

== Lanka Sama Samaja Party ==
Lanka Sama Samaja Party is a Trotskyist political party in Sri Lanka who played a major role in the independence movement of Sri Lanka.

== Sri Lanka Freedom Party ==
Sri Lanka Freedom Party is one of the major and most well known political parties in Sri Lanka. It was founded by S. W. R. D. Bandaranaike. After independence, the SLFP represented a form of non-revolutionary populist socialism and a policy of non-alignment with strong ties to socialist countries. However, after 1995 the party moved towards a more social democratic philosophy that sought to combine both the free market and the SLFP's traditional people friendly policies.
