= Chamila =

Chamila may refer to:

- Chamila people, an ethnic group of Colombia
- Chamila language, language of Colombia

== People with the name ==
An Indian given name and Sri Lankan given name

- Jagath Chamila, Sri Lankan actor
- Chamila Gamage, Sri Lankan cricketer
- Chamila Gamage, Sri Lankan contemporary artist

== See also ==
- Chimila (disambiguation)
