= Solomon Dias Bandaranaike =

Ceylonese colonial headman (1862–1946)

Sir Solomon Dias Bandaranaike KCMG JP
- Maha Mudaliyar of Ceylon
- Born: 22 May 1862; Veyangoda, British Ceylon
- Died: 31 July 1946 (aged 84); British Ceylon
- Education: S. Thomas' College, Mount Lavinia
- Occupation: Headman
- Title: Head Mudaliyar
- Spouse: Daisy Ezline Obeyesekere
- Children: S. W. R. D. Bandaranaike; Alexandra Camelia Bandaranaike; Anna Florentina Bandaranaike

Sir Solomon Dias Abeywickrema Jayatilleke Senewiratna Rajakumaruna Kadukeralu Bandaranaike, KCMG, JP (Sinhala: සොලමන් ඩයස් අබේවික්‍රම ජයතිලක සෙනෙවිරත්න රාජකුමාරුණ කඩුකෙරළු බණ්ඩාරනායක; 22 May 1862 – 31 July 1946) was a Ceylonese colonial-era headman. He was appointed as Head Mudaliyar and the aide-de-camp to the British Governor of Ceylon, therefore he was one of the most powerful personalities in British colonial Ceylon.

== Family History ==
The origins of the Bandaranayaka family in Sri Lanka is claimed to be from the person known as Nilaperumal Pandaram who was from India and served he was high priest of the Temple of Nawagamuwa Pattini Devalaya. The family changed their name to the Sinhalese form of Bandaranaike and they adopt Portuguese name like Dias. They served the Portuguese rule and got social privileges and later on Dutch. Their golden era began as translators and local scribes expanding their influence and power. A member of the family, Don William Dias who served as a translator for the British was present when deposed Kandyan King Sri Vikrama Rajasingha was captured while in hiding by Ekneligoda Disawa.

== Early life ==
Solomon Dias Bandaranaike was born on 22 May 1862, the son of the Anglican Gate Mudaliyar Don Christoffel Henricus Dias Abeywickrema Jayatilake Seneviratne Bandaranaike, Mudaliyar of the Governor's Gate and Mudaliyar of Siyane Korale East and Anna Florentina Philipsz. His grandfathers were Don Solomon Dias Bandaranayake, Mudaliyar of Siyane Korale East and Phillipsz Gysbertus Panditaratne, Mohandiram of the Governor's Gate. He was educated at S. Thomas' College, Mount Lavinia in Colombo. His sister Charlotte married Gate Mudaliyar Solomon Seneviratne, Mudaliar of the Atapattu of the Western Province.

== Colonial service ==
He was appointed a Muhandiram of the Governor's Gate in 1882 by Prince Albert Victor during his royal visit to Ceylon, following the death of his father in 1887 he succeeded him to the post of Mudaliyar of the Siyane Korale East. Eight years later, Governor Sir Arthur Havelock appointed him to the post of Maha Mudali (Head Mudaliyar) following the death of then Head Mudaliyar Conrad "Peter" Petrus Dias Wijewardena Bandaranaike who was also his uncle. This was the highest position available to a native Ceylonese in British Ceylon in 1895 and traveled to England as Ceylon's official representative at the Diamond Jubilee of Queen Victoria in 1896. He was the youngest to hold the position at the age of thirty three and would hold it for thirty three years until his retirement in 1928.

== Wealth ==
Sir Solomon was a wealthy land owner with large estates. Apart from his town house in Colombo, he built a stately house, Horagolla Walauwa, and converted his fathers walauwa in Horagolla to his stables, Horagolla Stables. He was the first Ceylonese to own a house in the hill station of Nuwara Eliya, which was an exclusive holiday destination for the British.

== Honours ==
Bandaranaike having received the honor appointment to the office of Head Mudaliyar, he was appointed a Justice of the Peace by the Governor and received permission from the Governor to add Rajakumaruna (meaning Royal Prince) to his name. In 1896, he traveled to England as Ceylon's official representative at the Diamond Jubilee of Queen Victoria. He attended the Coronation of King Edward VII in 1902, where he was appointed a Companion of the Order of St Michael and St George (CMG) in the 1902 Coronation Honours for his service to the British Empire and received the King Edward VII Coronation Medal. In August 1907, he was knighted. He received the King George V Coronation Medal in 1911. He was appointed Knight Commander of the Order of St Michael and St George (KCMG) in 1925 New Year Honours for his services to the Government of Ceylon. He was a Fellow of the Colonial Society and the Imperial Institute.

A keen horse breeder, he was the Life President of the Colombo Turf Club, which erected a statue during his lifetime in front of the Turf Club in Colombo which stands to this day. He was collector of antiquities, he donated Sir Henry Blake’s collection of palm leaf manuscripts to the Colombo National Museum. He was a life-member of the Ceylon Branch of the Royal Asiatic Society.

== Family ==
In April 1898, he married Daisy Ezline Obeyesekere, daughter of Solomon Christoffel Obeyesekere, a member of the Legislative Council of Ceylon. His son, Solomon West Ridgeway Dias Bandaranaike, became the 4th Prime Minister of Ceylon after independence, and his granddaughter, Chandrika Kumaratunga, became both Prime Minister and President of Sri Lanka. His grandson, Anura Bandaranaike, became Speaker of the Parliament of Sri Lanka.

== See also ==
- List of political families in Sri Lanka
- Horagolla Walauwa
- Bandaranaike family
