= Chamila Gamage (artist) =

Sri Lankan contemporary artist and sculptor

- චමිල ගමගේ
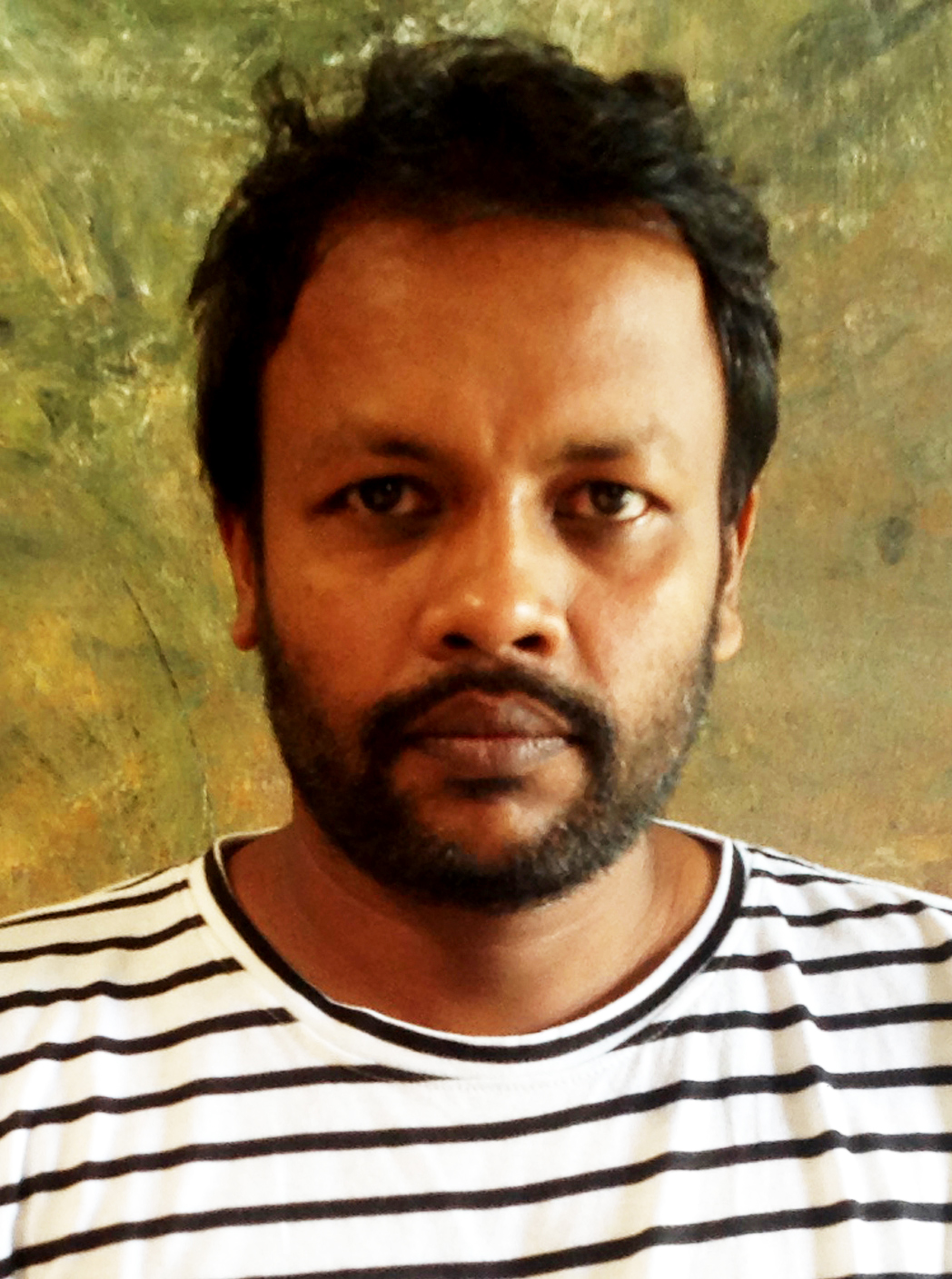
- Born: 9 August 1978 (age 48); Beliatta, Sri Lanka
- Education: Beliatta Central College; University of Kelaniya; University of the Visual and Performing Arts
- Occupations: Contemporary artist, sculptor
- Known for: Oil on canvas, acrylic on canvas, cement sculpture, Clay sculpture, Metal sculpture, Plaster of Paris sculpture, Digital paintings
- Style: Abstract art, modern art, Expressionism Art
- Spouse: Nishadi Thilakawardana (married 2009–present)
- Parents: Mahantha Gamage Nimal Pemarathna (father); Wickramarathna Bandaranayakalage Wasantha (mother)
- Website: chamilagamage.com

Chamila Gamage (Sinhala: චමිල ගමගේ) is a Sri Lankan contemporary artist and sculptor. His expresses himself through several different mediums including painting and drawing, sculpting and set designing. Chamila's styles are abstract art, modern art, expressionism art.

== Personal life ==
Chamila Gamage was born on 9 August 1978 in Beliatta, Sri Lanka. His parents are Mahantha Gamage Nimal Pemarathna. (father) and Wickramarathna Bandaranayakalage Wasantha (mother). He was the third child of a family of three boys and a girl. Chamila married Nishadi Thilakawardana on 22 May 2009. They move to Pannipitiya, where his art gallery and home located.

== Education ==
Chamila was sent to a school in Beliatta called Beliatta Central College. He earned a Bachelor of Fine Arts in Painting and Sculpture from University of the Visual and Performing Arts, Colombo, Sri Lanka and Master of fine Arts from University of Kelaniya, Sri Lanka.

== Career ==
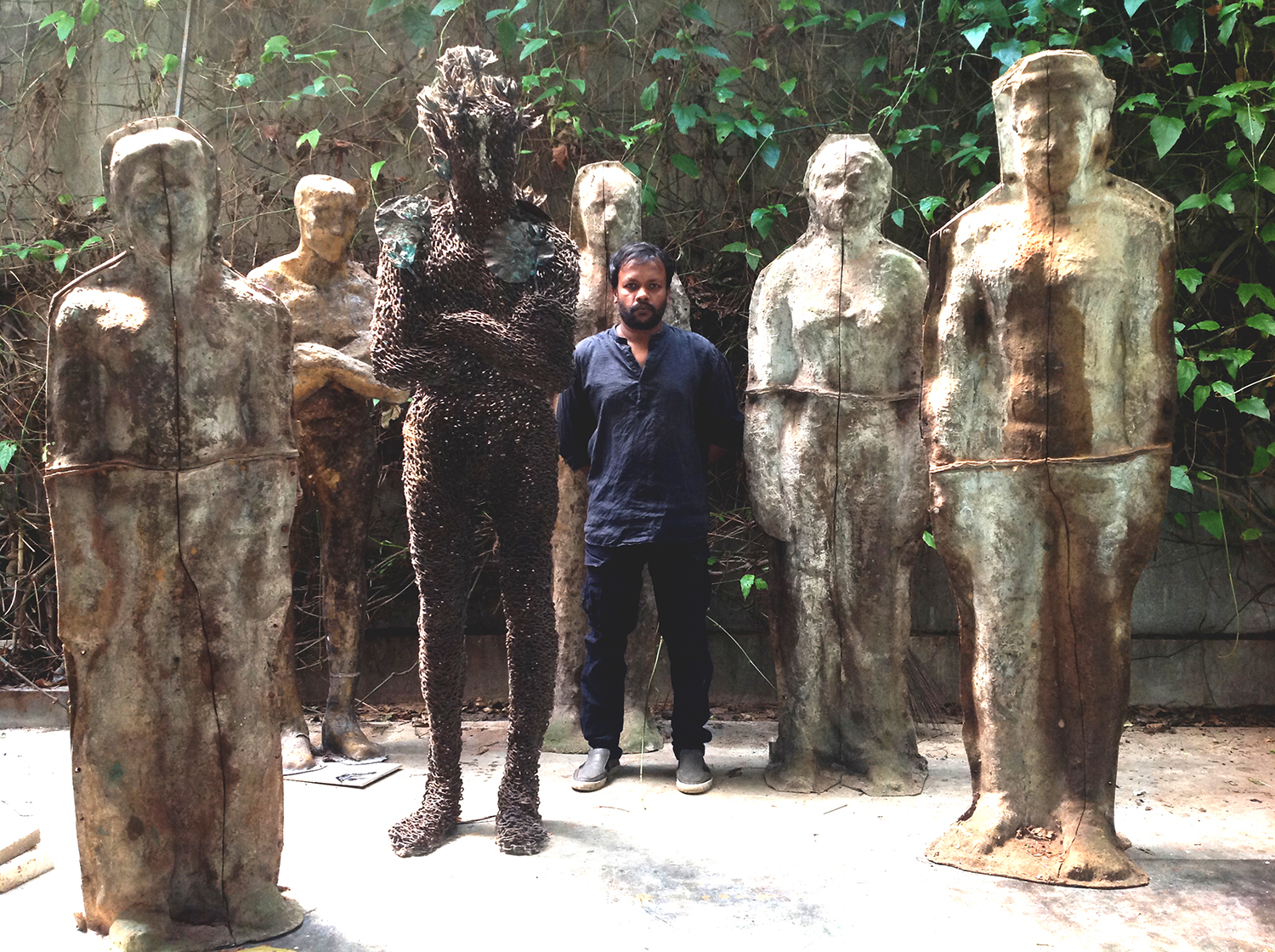
Chamila Gamage with sculptures at his gallery in Pannipitiya, Sri Lanka

His innate talent can be seen through number of different mediums including painting and drawing, sculpting and Set designing. Chamila believes that a drawing displayed in simple and crude lines, can tell a story to the viewer tapping into most basic human senses regardless of culture and language. He shows his artistic abilities in number of different genres including history, war, sexuality, and religion. His artwork has been shown in number of solo exhibitions throughout Sri Lanka and he also participated in international group exhibitions including Human Nature (2020, Germany), Art Exchange Exhibition (2018, China), and 17th Asian Art Biennale (2017, Bangladesh). His work permanently display at The Galle Fort Art Gallery, Tintagel Colombo, CA Collectors Gallery, Barefoot Gallery, Venusberg 6, Horagolla Stables and The Bungalow at Karma House.

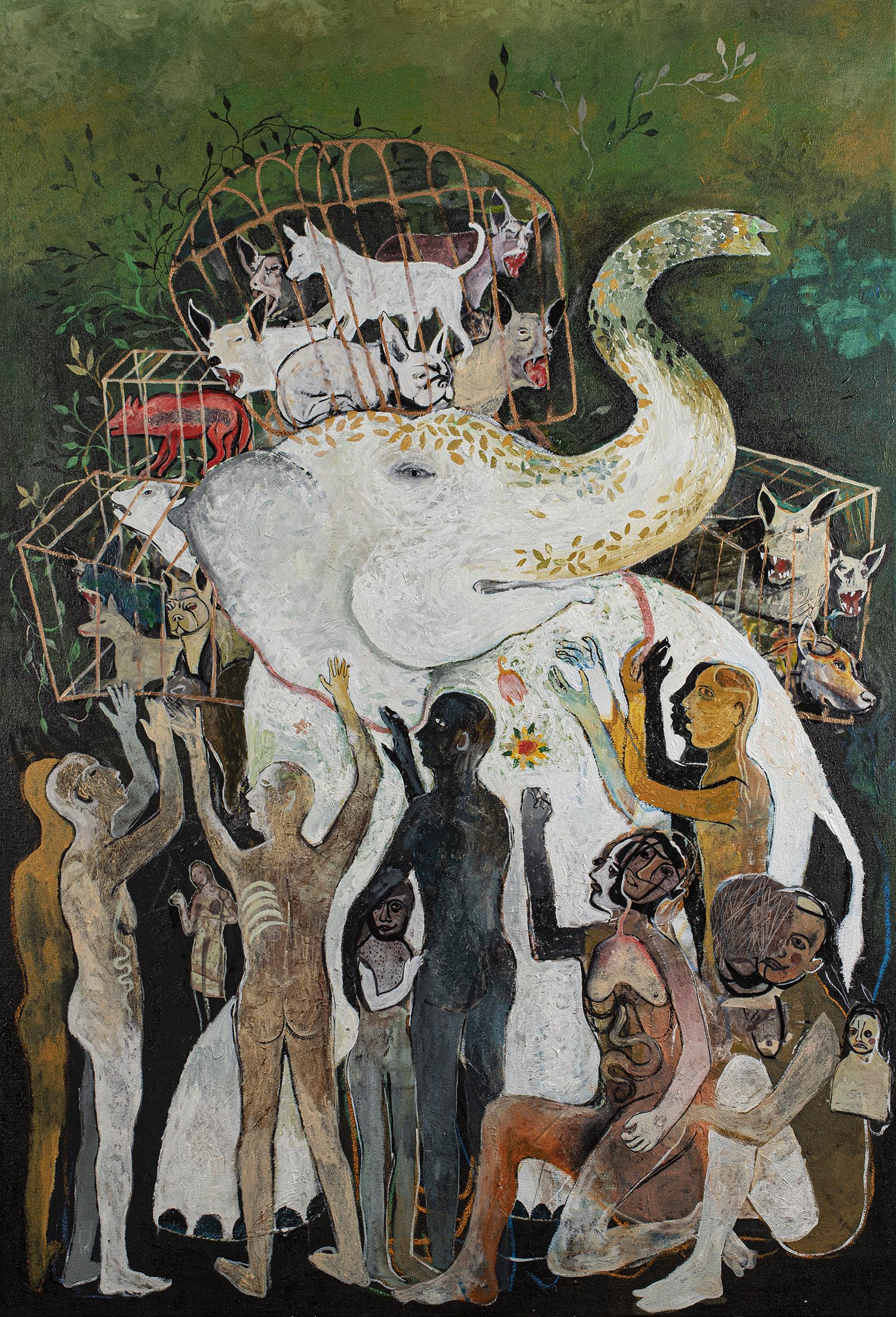
Chamila Gamage, 2021, Memories of Dream, oil on canvas, 136cm x 92cm

Chamila currently works as an Art Director & Set Designer in Sri Lanka Rupavahini Corporation, Sri Lanka. Also, he is lecturing in painting and sculpture at Cultural Center University of Sri Jayewardenepura and Department of Faculty of Visual Arts and University of the Visual and Performing Arts Colombo, Sri Lanka. Chamila was influenced by Pablo Picasso, Frida Kahlo, Kandyan Era Frescoes, Anselm Kiefer, Subodh Gupta, Saskia Pintelon, H A Karunaratne.

== Solo exhibitions ==
Year	Exhibition Name	Type	Venue
2021	Fabricated Society	Paintings	BareFoot Gallery, 704, Galle Road, Colombo 03, Sri Lanka
2018	Wonderland	Paintings	Paradise Road Gallery, Colombo, Sri Lanka
2017	This Is an Island	Paintings	Paradise Road Gallery, Colombo, Sri Lanka
2013	Monologue II	Visual Arts	Lionel Wendt Gallery, Colombo 7, Sri Lanka
2011	Social Network	Visual Arts	Paradise Road Galleries, Colombo 7, Sri Lanka
2007	Media & Men	Paintings	Paradise Road Galleries, Colombo 7, Sri Lanka
2006	Loiterers	Paintings	Paradise Road Galleries, Colombo 7, Sri Lanka
2005	Monologue	Paintings & Sculptures	Lionel Wendt Gallery, Colombo 7, Sri Lanka
1999	Ridma Rata	Paintings & Sculptures	Darmapala College, D.A Rajapaksha memorial hall, Beliatta Sri Lanka

== Group exhibitions ==
Year	Exhibition Name	Type	Vanue
2020	Human Nature	Visual Arts	Gallery Basement 16, Germany
2019	Unsettling Time	Paintings	The Galle fort Art Gallery, Galle, Sri Lanka
2019	Sri Lanka & Bangladesh Art Exposition	Paintings & Sculptures	Harold Peiris Gallery, Colombo 07, Sri Lanka
2019	Sri Lankan Artist 2019	Visual Arts	Gorge Keyt Foundation, JDA Perera Gallery, Colombo 07, Sri Lanka
2019	Colombo Fashion Week	Visual Arts	Colombo, Sri Lanka
2018	China & Sri Lanka Art Exchange	Visual Arts	Shanghai, China
2017	17th Asian Art Biennale	Visual Arts	Shilpakala Academy Dhaka, Bangladesh
2016	Collective Identity	Visual Arts	The Text Gallery, Jayasuriya Center, Colombo 07, Sri Lanka
2013	Young Contemporaries	Visual Arts	Gorge Keyt Foundation, JDA Perera Gallery, Colombo 07, Sri Lanka
2010	State Art Festival	Paintings & Sculptures	National Art Gallery, Colombo 07, Sri Lanka
2009	State Art Festival	Paintings & Sculptures	National Art Gallery, Colombo 07, Sri Lanka
2007	Young Contemporaries	Visual Arts	Gorge Keyt Foundation, JDA Perera Gallery, Colombo 07, Sri Lanka
2005	State Art Festival	Paintings & Sculptures	National Art Gallery, Colombo 07, Sri Lanka
2005	Tsunami Fund-Raising Exhibition	Visual Arts	Faculty of Visual Arts, Colombo 07, Sri Lanka
2004	Ruhuna Aruna	Visual Arts	BMICH, Colombo, Sri Lanka
2002	Transition 2002	Visual Arts	National Art Gallery, Colombo, Sri Lanka.
2001	State Art Festival	Paintings & Sculptures	National Art Gallery, Colombo 07, Sri Lanka
