= Samarakone Rala =

Head Mudaliyar Military Chief of Portuguese Ceylon

Don Diaz Fernández Abeysundere Samarakone (Samarakone Mudaliyanse Ralahami in the historical chronicle Mahāvaṃsa or Don Diaz Abeysundere Samarakone Fernández Mudaliyar) was a Ceylonese military chief and minister of the Royal Court in the Kingdom of Kotte. He served as the Head Mudaliyar Military Chief of Portuguese Ceylon.

== Life ==
Don Diaz Fernández Abeysundere Samarakone was born in Hakmana, Matara to a Govigama family named Abeysundere Samarakone Mudaliyanse, which was confirmed in the chronicles Rajavaliya and Mahāvaṃsa. The family consisted of Kotte chieftains.

With the growing influence and solidarity of the Portuguese with Parakramabahu VIII and his heir Dharmapala of Kotte, Samarakone proved his loyalty to the Portuguese, which earned him the titles of Diaz and Fernández. According to multiple records, he was the first to be awarded the Knighthood of Order of the Christ in Asia. Samarakone was known to the Portuguese as a military chief of Kotte, due to his military skills and brilliance, as well as his loyalty. He became the captain and also the first and only Maha Mudaliyar of Ceylon appointed by the Portuguese. His family is one of the most influential in Kotte and later Portuguese Ceylon. According to Mahāvaṃsa, Samarakone was offered the Throne of Seetwaka by Kirthi Sri Rajasinha, but he refused and remained loyal to the Portuguese as per the commands of his former king, Dharmapala of Kotte.

He was appointed the Dissave by the Portuguese for the Matara Dissavaniya (Province). He was appointed Captain of the Uduwara Fort built by the Portuguese in Ceylon. He served as Captain of Gaua, which was the then Headquarters of the Portuguese in Asia. At the time of his death he was the Captain of Homuz. He was the first Asian to be awarded the Order of the Christ Knighthood.

== Family tree ==
1. Maha Mudaliyar Don Diaz Fernández Abeysundere Samarakone (Chevalier) – Head Mudaliyar of Portuguese Ceylon

1.2.Dona Balaethana Abeysundera Samarakone + Mudaliyar Don David Samarakone Wijesinha of Kandaboda Pattu (Son of Muhandiram Caroliz Wijesinha/ grand-son of Mudaliyar Don Cornelius Wijesinha of Weligam Koralaya).

1.2.3. Dona Kaluethana Wijesinha + Don Simon Samarakone Wijesinha (first cousin)

1.2.3.4.Don David Samarakone Wijesinha (Registrar of Getamanna+ lady from the Wijesekara family of Madugoda Walauwa

1.2.3.4.5.Don Miguel Samarakone Wijesinha

1.2.3.4.5.Don Juan Samarakone Wijesinha + Bala Ethana Konda Liyanaarachchi of Weliwarusa Getamanna

1.2.3.4.5.6. Son

1.2.3.4.5.6. Son

(following the death of Don Juan, Don Miguel (brother) married Balaethana and the following were born)

1.2.3.4.5.6.Son

1.2.3.4.5.6.Don David Samarakone Wijesinha + Dona Catherine Wickramasinghe of the Warnabharana Wickramasinghe family.

1.2.3.4.5.6.7. Muhandiram Don Aelias Samarakone Wijesinha + Lady from the Kitalagama Rajapaksa Yapa family.

1.2.3.4.5.6.7.8.Somawathie Wijesinha + James Dias Ratnatunga of Aranwela Walawwa

1.2.3.4.5.6.7.8.Seelawathie Wijesinha + Richard Dias Amaradivakara of Kottasa Walawwa

(Following the death of the lady from the Kitalagama Rajapaksa Yapa family, Don Aelias married a lady from the Madawala Abeysiriwardene Kulatunga family from Madawala Walawwa, and the following were born)

1.2.3.4.5.6.7.8. Wimalawathie Wijesinha + Samuel St.David de Saa Bandaranayake of Wehalla Walawwa
1.2.3.4.5.6.7.8. Edward Gunapala Wijesinha + Placida Amarasekara
1.2.3.4.5.6.7.8. Francis Sumathipala Wijesinha + Indra Gunaratne of Kirama Walawwa
1.2.3.4.5.6.7.8. Samson Senapala Samarakoon Wijesinha (former Secretary General of Parliament (Sri Lanka) + Mukta Wickremesinghe

1.2.3.4.5.6.7. Don Cornelius Samarakone Wijesinha of Danuketiya

(following the death of Dona Catherine, a lady from the Dissanayaka family of Nakulugamuwa Walawwa was married to Don David and the following were born)

1.2.3.4.5.6.7.Son
1.2.3.4.5.6.7.Son
1.2.3.4.5.6.7.Son
1.2.3.4.5.6.7.daughter

1.2.3.4.5.6.daughter

1.2.3. Dona Dingiriethana Wijesinha + Don Simon Wijetunga Hatharasinghe

1.2.3. Don Simon Appuhamy Wijesinha (ordained as Ven.Karatota Sri Dharmarana Thero)
