= Chimila =

Chimila may refer to:

- Chimila people, an ethnic group of Colombia
- Chimila language, a language of Colombia
- Chimila (wasp), a genus of wasps

== See also ==
- Chimillas, a municipality of Spain
- Chamila (disambiguation)
