= S. W. R. D. Bandaranaike =

4th Prime Minister of the Dominion of Ceylon (now Sri Lanka) from 1956 to 1959

- සොලොමන් වෙස්ට් රිජ්වේ ඩයස් බණ්ඩාරනායක சொலமன் வெஸ்ட் ரிட்ஜ்வே டயஸ் பண்டாரநாயக்கா
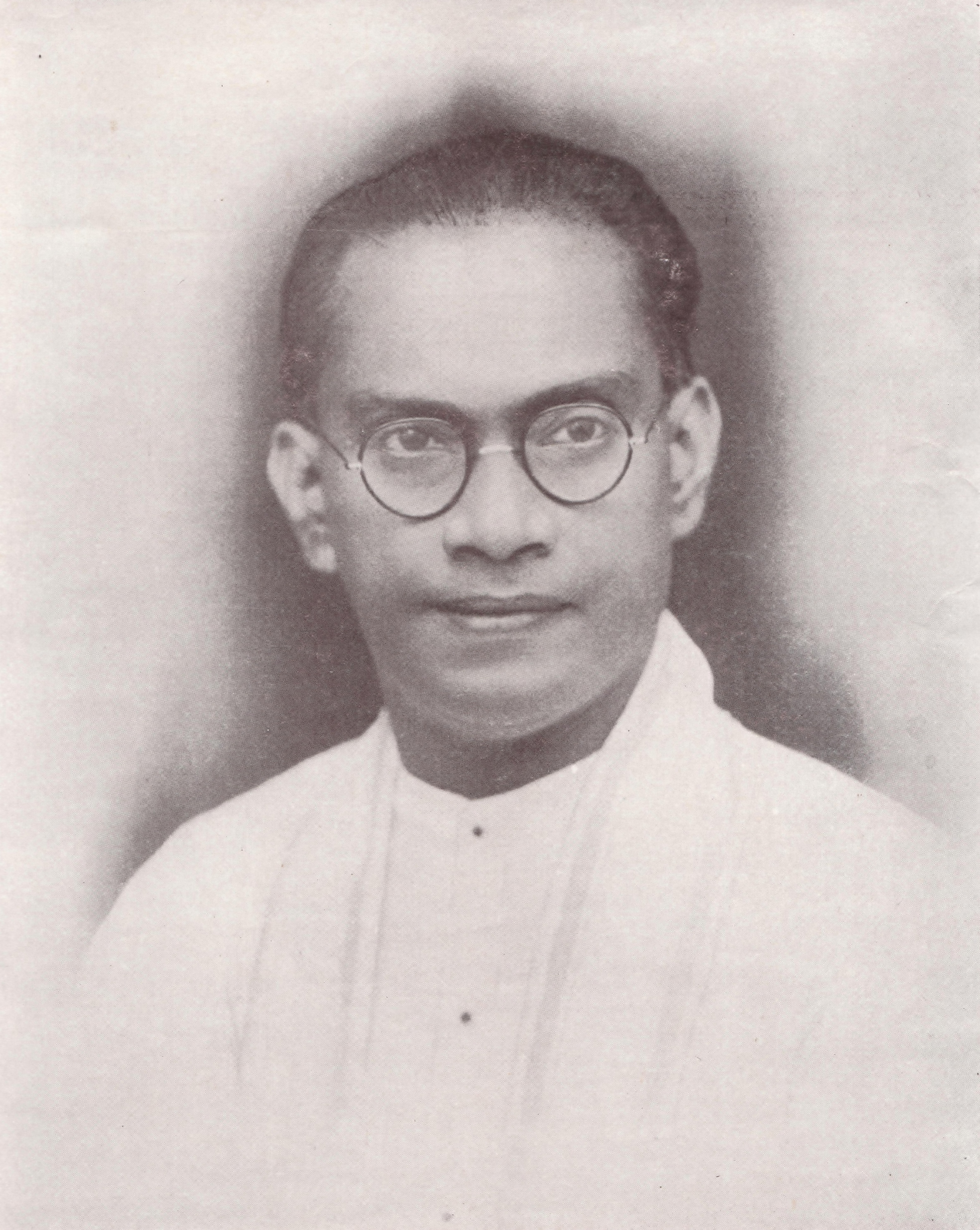

4th Prime Minister of Ceylon
- In office 12 April 1956 – 26 September 1959
- Monarch: Elizabeth II
- Governor General: Oliver Ernest Goonetilleke
- Preceded by: John Kotelawala
- Succeeded by: Wijeyananda Dahanayake

2nd Leader of the Opposition
- In office 9 June 1952 – 18 February 1956
- Prime Minister: Dudley Senanayake
- Preceded by: N. M. Perera
- Succeeded by: N. M. Perera

Leader of the Sri Lanka Freedom Party
- In office 2 September 1951 – 26 September 1959
- Preceded by: Position established
- Succeeded by: C. P. de Silva

3rd Leader of the House
- In office 26 September 1947 – 12 July 1951
- Prime Minister: D. S. Senanayake
- Preceded by: D. S. Senanayake
- Succeeded by: John Kotelawala

Minister of Health and Local Government
- In office 26 September 1947 – 12 July 1951
- Prime Minister: D. S. Senanayake
- Preceded by: Position established
- Succeeded by: Dudley Senanayake

Member of the Ceylon Parliament for Attanagalla
- In office 14 October 1947 – 26 September 1959
- Preceded by: Constituency established
- Succeeded by: James Obeyesekere

Personal details
- Born: 8 January 1899 Colombo, British Ceylon (present-day Sri Lanka)
- Died: 26 September 1959 (aged 60) Colombo, Ceylon
- Cause of death: Assassination
- Party: Sri Lanka Freedom Party (1951–1959)
- Other political affiliations: United National Party (1946–1951)
- Spouse: Sirima Ratwatte (m. 1940)
- Children: Sunethra; Chandrika; Anura
- Parent: Solomon Dias Bandaranaike (father)
- Relatives: Panini Ilangakoon (cousin); James Peter Obeyesekere II (cousin)
- Education: Christ Church, Oxford (BA); Inner Temple (LPC)
- Website: Official website

Solomon West Ridgeway Dias Bandaranaike (Note: Sinhala: සොලොමන් වෙස්ට් රිජ්වේ ඩයස් බණ්ඩාරනායක; Tamil: சொலமன் வெஸ்ட் ரிட்ஜ்வே டயஸ் பண்டாரநாயக்கா) (8 January 1899 – 26 September 1959), also known as "The Silver Bell of Asia", (Note: Sinhala: ආසියාවේ රිදී සීනුව) was a Ceylonese statesman who served as the fourth Prime Minister of the Dominion of Ceylon (now Sri Lanka), from 1956 until his assassination in 1959. The founder of the left-wing and Sinhalese nationalist Sri Lanka Freedom Party (SLFP), he was elected the fourth Prime Minister of Ceylon after creating a powerful coalition called the Mahajana Eksath Peramuna and contesting on the lines of Sinhalese nationalism and democratic socialism. He achieved a landslide victory over the ruling United National Party in the general elections in 1956.

His tenure saw some of the first left wing reforms instituted by the Freedom Party in Sri Lanka such as nationalizing the bus services and introducing legislation to prohibit caste based discrimination. Bandaranaike further consolidated Sri Lanka's newly gained independence by formally abrogating the 1947 United Kingdom–Ceylon Defence Agreement and establishing diplomatic missions with a number of communist states. He implemented a new language policy, the Sinhala Only Act, making Sinhala the sole official language of the country, creating much controversy.

On 25 September 1959, Bandaranaike was shot at his town house in Colombo and died of his wounds the day after. A Buddhist monk named Ven Talduwe Somarama was arrested, convicted and hanged for the murder of Bandaranaike. Minister of Education and the acting leader of the house, Wijeyananda Dahanayake was appointed caretaker prime minister by the Governor General and was confirmed by Parliament.

Bandaranaike's widow Sirimavo Bandaranaike led the Freedom Party to gain a majority in parliament and was democratically elected the first female prime minister in the world. She expanded on her husband's left-wing reforms in her first two terms as prime minister from 1960 to 1965 and from 1970 to 1977. In 1994, Bandaranaike's daughter Chandrika Kumaratunga headed a coalition led by the Freedom Party to be elected prime minister and thereafter president serving from 1994 to 2005. Sirimavo Bandaranaike returned to office for a third term as prime minister in 1994, serving until her retirement in 2000. Their son, Anura Bandaranaike, served as Speaker of the Parliament of Sri Lanka from 2000 to 2001.

== Early life and education ==
Solomon West Ridgeway Dias Bandaranaike was born in Colombo, Ceylon, to the wealthy Sinhalese Anglican Christian Bandaranaike family, which had become one of the more elite native families under the British administration. His father was Sir Solomon Dias Bandaranaike, the Maha Mudaliyar of Ceylon at the time (Note: The native aide-de-camp, chief native interpreter and adviser to the Governor of Ceylon), while his mother, Daisy Ezline Obeyesekere, was a daughter of Sir Solomon Christoffel Obeyesekere, a member of the Legislative Council of Ceylon. Sir Solomon named his only son after Sir Joseph West Ridgeway, the Governor of Ceylon at the time, who was his godfather. He had two sisters, Alexandra Camelia, and Anna Florentina. Sir Forester Obeysekera was his maternal uncle.

He was tutored at his home, Horagolla Walauwa, by Henry Young, an English tutor from Nuwaraeliya, and thereafter by A. C. Radford, a Cambridge graduate. The young Bandaranaike had a difficult childhood with his father and tutors, who imposed their ideals on him. With the outbreak of the Great War, Radford returned to Britain and young Bandaranaike attended St Thomas' College, Mutwal, where he boarded with the warden, Rev. Arthur William Stone. He found Rev. Stone less imposing his ideals on him and encouraging of forming his own opinion. At St Thomas' College, Bandaranaike played tennis and took part in debating. He passed his Senior Cambridge examinations with distinctions in English, Latin, Greek and French, and gained the second Order of Merit in the British Empire that year. Delayed by the Great War, he entered Christ Church, Oxford, where he read philosophy, politics and economics, and graduated with honours in 1923. At Oxford, he was President of the Majlis Society; his contemporaries at Oxford included Anthony Eden. A keen debater and orator, took an active role in the Oxford Union, where he was elected junior treasurer. He contested the presidency of the Oxford Union, and came third to Lord Scrymgeour. In 1924, he became a barrister and was called to the bar at the Inner Temple; on his return to Ceylon, he took oaths as an Advocate of the Supreme Court of Ceylon.

== Early political career ==
After his return from Britain, Bandaranaike became active in local politics. He got elected as the Chairman of the Nittambuwa Village Committee in his family seat. He became Secretary of the Ceylon National Congress (CNC) in 1926, and in December the same year was elected from the Maradana Ward to the Colombo Municipal Council, defeating the trade unionist A. E. Goonesinha.

== State Council ==
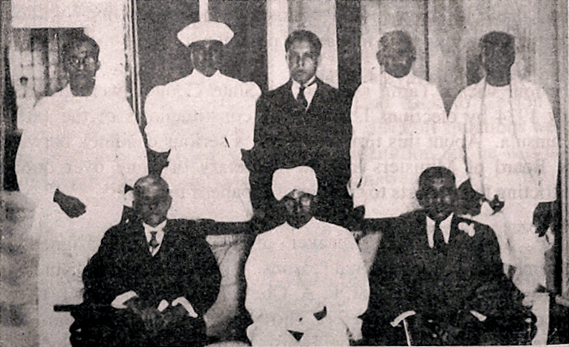
Second Board of Ministers of Ceylon. Bandaranaike is in the left corner standing.

Following the implementation of the Donoughmore Constitution, the State Council of Ceylon was established as the first legislature in the island with its members elected through universal suffrage. Bandaranaike contended and was elected unopposed from Veyangoda at the 1931 election to the first State Council and was elected to the executive committee for local administration, chaired by Charles Batuwantudawe. He stated in the council that the committee system introduced in the new constitution was satisfactory at the time.

=== Minister of Local Administration ===
In 1936, he was re-elected unopposed from Veyangoda in the 1936 election to the second State Council. In its first meeting, he was elected as Minister of Local Administration. As Minister, he was chairmen of the executive committee on local administration, of which he had been a member in the previous term and was a member of the Board of Ministers.

== Sinhala Maha Sabha ==
In order to promote Sinhalese culture and community interests, Bandaranaike founded the Sinhala Maha Sabha in 1936. He introduced the Free Lanka Bill in the State Council in 1945 In 1947, when Leader of the House, D. S. Senanayake presented the Soulbury Constitution to the State Council, Bandaranaike seconded the motion stating that he does so as the Sinhala Maha Sabha was the largest party in the State Council.

With Ceylon heading for self-rule under dominion status, D.S. Senanayake invited Bandaranaike to combine his Sinhala Maha Sabha with other smaller parties into the United National Party (UNP) which Senanayake was forming to contest for the 1947 election under the new Soulbury Constitution. Bandaranaike accepted the invitation, formally dissolving the Sinhala Maha Sabha and merging with the UNP.

== First Cabinet Minister of Health and Local Government ==
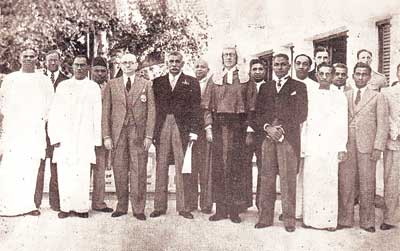
The first Cabinet of Ministers of Ceylon. Bandaranaike is in the first row-second from the left

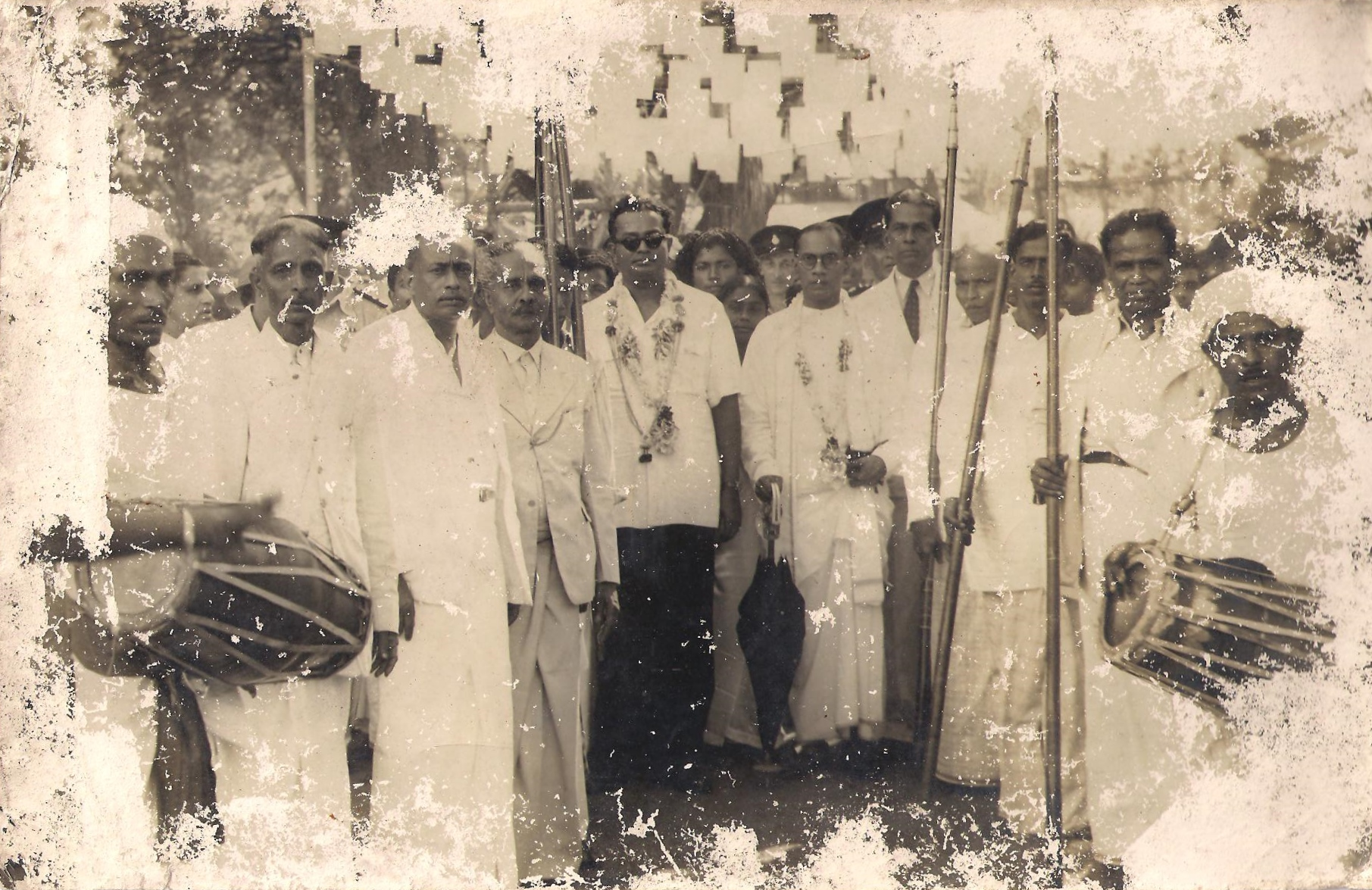
Bandaranaike in Kandy as Minister of Health and Local Government

He contested for the newly formed House of Representatives in the 1947 election from the UNP from Attanagalla, winning with a good majority. In September 1947, D.S. Senanayake appointed him to his cabinet as the first Minister of Health and Local Government of Ceylon and he was elected as the Leader of the House. Effectively this made Bandaranaike the most senior member of the cabinet, after the Prime Minister. In fact, Senanayake had Sir Oliver Goonetilleke discuss with Bandaranaike as leader of the Sinhala Maha Sabha, the draft agreements for independence; which Bandaranaike received with mixed feelings. However, he did not object and the agreements signed with the Britain government making way for Ceylon to gain self-rule. As leader of the house, he delivered the address of thanks at the ceremonial opening of parliament on 4 February 1948, which marked Ceylon's independence from Britain.

During the next few years, he supported legislation proposed by the government as leader of the house. This included the Ceylon Citizenship Act No. 18 of 1948 and the Indian and Pakistani Residents (Citizenship) Act No.3 of 1949 which deprived citizenship to Indian Tamils. He initiated several projects for the improvement of health as minister of health, including the expansion of hospitals and uplifting ayurveda medicine. He attended the Third World Health Assembly in Geneva in May 1950 as Chief delegate of Ceylon. However, he found himself at odds with Senanayake administration on policy. By 1951, it also appeared that Senanayake did not intend to make an early retirement that would have allowed Bandaranaike to succeed him as prime minister.

== Cross over and formation of the Sri Lanka Freedom Party ==
In July 1951, Bandaranaike resigned from his government posts and crossed the floor to the opposition with several of his close associates from the Sinhala Maha Sabha. Thereafter he dissolved the Sinhala Maha Sabha and formed a new party, the Sri Lanka Freedom Party (SLFP) having its inaugural meeting at Town Hall on 2 September 1951.

A few months later, on 21 March 1952 D.S. Senanayake fell off his horse, while on his morning ride after suffering a stroke and died the following day. Although Sir John Kotelawala was expected to succeed him, his son Dudley Senanayake, Minister of Agriculture was appointed prime minister on 26 March 1952 by the Governor-General Lord Soulbury. Dudley Senanayake called a general election in 1952, which the UNP won gaining 54 seats in parliament.

== Leader of the Opposition (1952 - 1956) ==
Bandaranaike contested the general election from the SLFP for the Attanagalla seat and was re-elected. With the SLFP gaining nine seats and the LSSP gaining nine. Bandaranaike was elected Leader of the Opposition. The leftist agitated Hartal 1953 affected Senanayake, who shortly stepped down. Kotelawala succeeded him as prime minister.

=== Pancha Maha Balavegaya ===
Between 1952 and 1956, Bandaranaike spent much of its time consolidating the new party. Although it drew many supporters from the old Sinhala Maha Sabha, it was still relatively new facing a lack of funds and the lack of support from mess media as it could not afford a party newspaper. It drew much of its support from the rural areas that were marginalized or neglected by the incumbent UNP government which was pro-establishment. On the issue of language, the party originally espoused the use of both Sinhala and Tamil as national languages, but in the mid-1950s it adopted a "Swabasha" (native language) policy. The party asserted itself as a champion of the Buddhist religion; the SLFP has thus customarily relied upon the socially and politically influential Buddhist clergy (the Sangha) to carry its message to rural Sinhalese. Since the 1950s, SLFP platforms have reflected the earlier organization's emphasis on appealing to the sentiments of the Sinhalese masses in rural areas. To this basis has been added the anti-establishment appeal of non-revolutionary socialism. Bandaranaike continued his policies stated in 1952, on language, Buddhism, and Ayurvedic medicine. As such he stated that the basis of the party would be the 'Pancha Maha Balavegaya' (Five Great Forces) which consisted of the native doctors, clergy, teachers, farmers and workers.

=== Mahajana Eksath Peramuna and the 1956 elections ===
In 1956, Kotelawala called for early elections. Bandaranaike responded by assembling a coalition with a group of small Marxist parties to form the Mahajana Eksath Peramuna (MEP) to contest the 1956 general elections. The MEP was a four-party coalition with a no-contest pact with the Lanka Sama Samaja Party and the Communist Party of Sri Lanka. Although he inherited his father's vast estate at the death of Sir Solomon in 1946, he was riddled with death duties. Short on funds for the election, Bandaranaike mortgaged his town house at Rosmead Place to the Bank of Ceylon for Rs 200,000; which he used for his campaign.

== Prime minister (1956 - 1959) ==
The 1956 elections was a landslide victory for the MEP as it gained a two-thirds majority in parliament and Bandaranaike was invited by the Governor General to form a government as the fourth prime minister of Ceylon in April 1956. He formed his cabinet with a collection of senior members of the parties that made up the MEP and several independents.

=== Language policy and communal tension ===
In keeping with one of his primary election polices, Bandaranaike had the Official Language Act (No. 33 of 1956) passed. known as the Sinhala Only Act, it made Sinhala language the sole official language of the country, replacing English which he had promised to do within 24 hours of coming to power. However, this move was not solely an act of ethnic exclusion; for many Sinhalese, it was seen as a way for a newly independent nation to assert its identity and break away from colonial legacies, since English had long been the language of administration and privilege under British rule. Its supporters viewed it as a necessary step to empower the Sinhalese majority and promote national unity after independence.

It created immediate distrust among the minority Sri Lankan Tamils which resulted in protests as they found themselves disenfranchised, these protests lead to several riots in 1956 and 1958. The Tamil Language (Special Provisions) Act was passed in September 1958 to remedy the effects of the Official Language Act, it fell short of making the Tamil language an official language in par with the Sinhala language. He is also remembered for his failure to carry out an effective response to the 1958 riots, leading to the deaths of many Tamil citizens at the hands of mobs. The Governor General declared a state of emergency on 27 May after six days of riots at the request of the Prime Minister. He introduced legislation to prohibit caste based discrimination.

Bandaranaike’s efforts to address ethnic tensions included the signing of the Bandaranaike–Chelvanayakam Pact in 1957, which aimed to resolve Tamil grievances through regional autonomy. However, facing opposition from ultra-nationalist elements within his own party, he was forced to withdraw the pact in 1958.

=== Foreign policy ===
S.W.R.D. Bandaranaike’s tenure marked a decisive transformation in Ceylon’s foreign policy, steering the country away from its earlier pro-Western alignment under the United National Party towards a policy of non-alignment and engagement with newly independent nations and the socialist bloc. Bandaranaike established diplomatic relations with the People’s Republic of China in 1957, following a landmark visit by Premier Zhou Enlai, and also opened channels with the Soviet Union and Eastern Bloc countries, securing economic aid and technical assistance. These moves reflected his broader vision of positioning Ceylon as a neutral actor amidst Cold War rivalries and strengthening ties with Asian and African nations.

Bandaranaike developed close personal relationships with leaders such as Jawaharlal Nehru of India and Zhou Enlai of China, reinforcing regional cooperation and solidarity among post-colonial states. His government was a vocal supporter of Egypt during the Suez Crisis, advocating for decolonization and national sovereignty at the United Nations and earning Ceylon a seat on the Suez Advisory Board.

A significant milestone of his foreign policy was the abrogation of the 1947 United Kingdom–Ceylon Defence Agreement. Bandaranaike successfully negotiated the withdrawal of British military bases at RAF Negombo, RAF China Bay, and the naval base at Trincomalee, a move seen as a step towards full national sovereignty. However, the closure of these bases resulted in job losses for local workers and increased Ceylon’s reliance on India for security.

=== Economic policy ===
S.W.R.D. Bandaranaike’s government initiated a wave of socialist-oriented economic reforms that marked a sharp shift from the island’s previous Anglo-Saxon economic model. His administration prioritized nationalization of key sectors, labor reforms, and policies aimed at uplifting the rural poor and reducing social inequalities.

==== Nationalization and State-Led Development ====
A 10 year (1959 – 1968) integrated development program for the whole economy was prepared by the National Planning Council that was established in October 1956, which aimed at utilizing available resources at an optimum level to improve the living standards of the people.

Bandaranaike’s government nationalized several major industries and public utilities, including the bus companies-leading to the creation of the Ceylon Transport Board in 1958, which became one of the largest omnibus companies in the world at its peak. The Colombo Port was also nationalized, and the Ceylon Shipping Corporation was established to boost state control over transport and trade. These moves were intended to improve efficiency, expand services to underserved regions, and reduce foreign and elite control over crucial sectors.

==== Social Welfare and Rural Reforms ====
To protect peasant farmers, the government introduced the Paddy Lands Bill, which sought to secure the rights of tenant cultivators and improve rural livelihoods. The Employees' Provident Fund was established to provide retirement security for workers, and May Day was declared a public holiday, reflecting the administration’s commitment to labor rights and social welfare.

==== Challenges and Criticisms ====
Despite these ambitious reforms, the policies did not yield immediate economic benefits. The country faced persistent economic challenges, including food shortages, rising costs of imports, and budgetary deficits. Critics argued that the nationalization drive and heavy state intervention stifled private enterprise, led to inefficiencies, and discouraged investment, with some warning of long-term negative economic effects .

=== National policies ===
Bandaranaike initiated the process to abolish the colonial era Ceylon Civil Service and replace it with a broader Ceylon Administrative Service which replaced the merit based public administration with an appointment based system that was opened to political influence. Due to the change of the official language, many experienced civil servants opted for early retirement. He suspended all British and native honors and enacted the Suspension of the Capital Punishment Act No 20 of 1958, which suspended the death penalty from May 1958.

=== Strikes and cabinet crisis ===
In early 1959, a cabinet crisis resulted in the resignation of the leftist Philip Gunawardena and William de Silva. However the MEP remained intact. In 1959 trade unions at Colombo Harbour went on strike crippling imports and exports. Bandaranaike requested that the police intervene against trade union action, the order was declined by IGP Osmund de Silva on the grounds that he believed it to be unlawful. In April 1959, de Silva was compulsorily retired from the police force and M. Walter F. Abeykoon, a civil servant and Bandaranaike's bridge partner at the Orient Club, was appointed in his place.

== Assassination ==
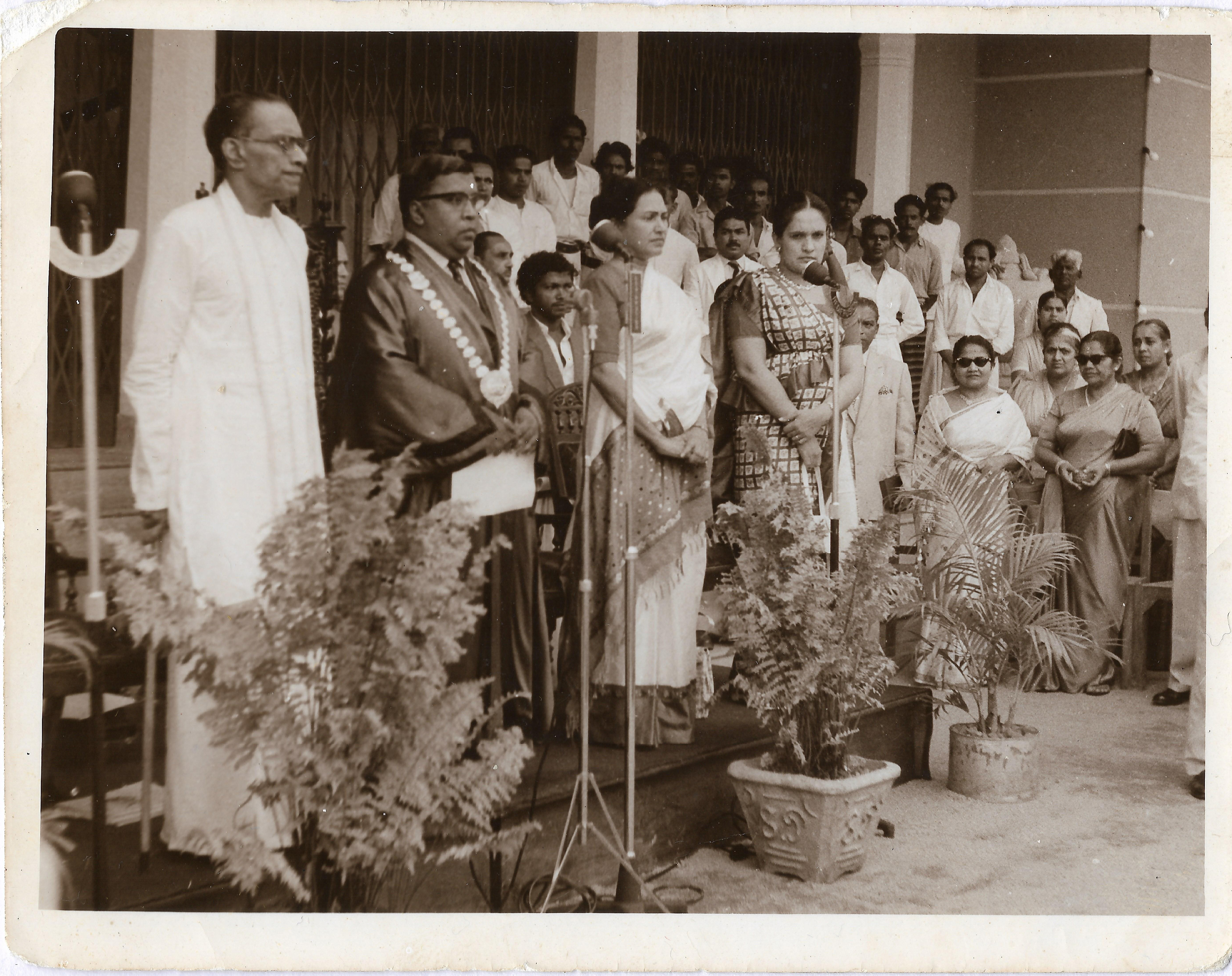
Bandaranaike with Srimavo and E. L. Senanayake on 23 September 1959 in Kandy, two days before his assassination.

Bandaranaike died four years into his term, aged 60 on 26 September 1959, at the Merchant's Ward of the Colombo General Hospital due to wounds sustained after being shot by Talduwe Somarama, a Buddhist monk.

On 25 September, Somarama had visited Bandaranaike at his private residence, Tintagel, in Rosmead Place, Colombo. Since Somarama appeared to be a member of the Buddhist clergy, he was not searched for weapons and given free access to the prime minister as he began his routine meetings with the public. The monk then fired a revolver at Bandaranaike as the latter stood to greet him; he was rushed to hospital but died the following day despite six hours of surgery by Ceylon's most skilled surgeons. A Supreme Court trial found Somarama, Mapitigama Buddharakkitha, and H.P. Jayewardena guilty and pronounced on all three of them the death sentence (death by hanging). Although Bandaranaike's administration had suspended capital punishment, Talduwe Somarama was hanged on 6 July 1962. It was claimed by the court that the reason for the murder of Bandaranaike, was his refusal to entertain Buddharakitha Thero's requests following his support for Buddharakitha in the election.

After Bandaranaike's death, Wijeyananda Dahanayake, minister of education and the acting leader of the house, was appointed caretaker prime minister by the Governor General and was confirmed by Parliament. C. P. de Silva, the minister of lands, land development and agriculture, and the leader of the house had taken ill at a cabinet meeting on 25 August 1959 and was flown to the United Kingdom for treatment, making Dahanayake the acting leader of the house and his name had been put up by Bandaranaike as acting prime minister, during his planned visit to the UN.

However, he fell out of favor with the members of the government, resulting in the removal of all ministers of Bandaranaike's cabinet in less than a year. Eventually, the leadership of the Sri Lanka Freedom Party fell to Bandaranaike's widow Sirima Ratwatte Dias Bandaranaike who held the SLFP to an election victory in July 1960 becoming the world's first female prime minister and was soon appointed a senator.

== Family life ==
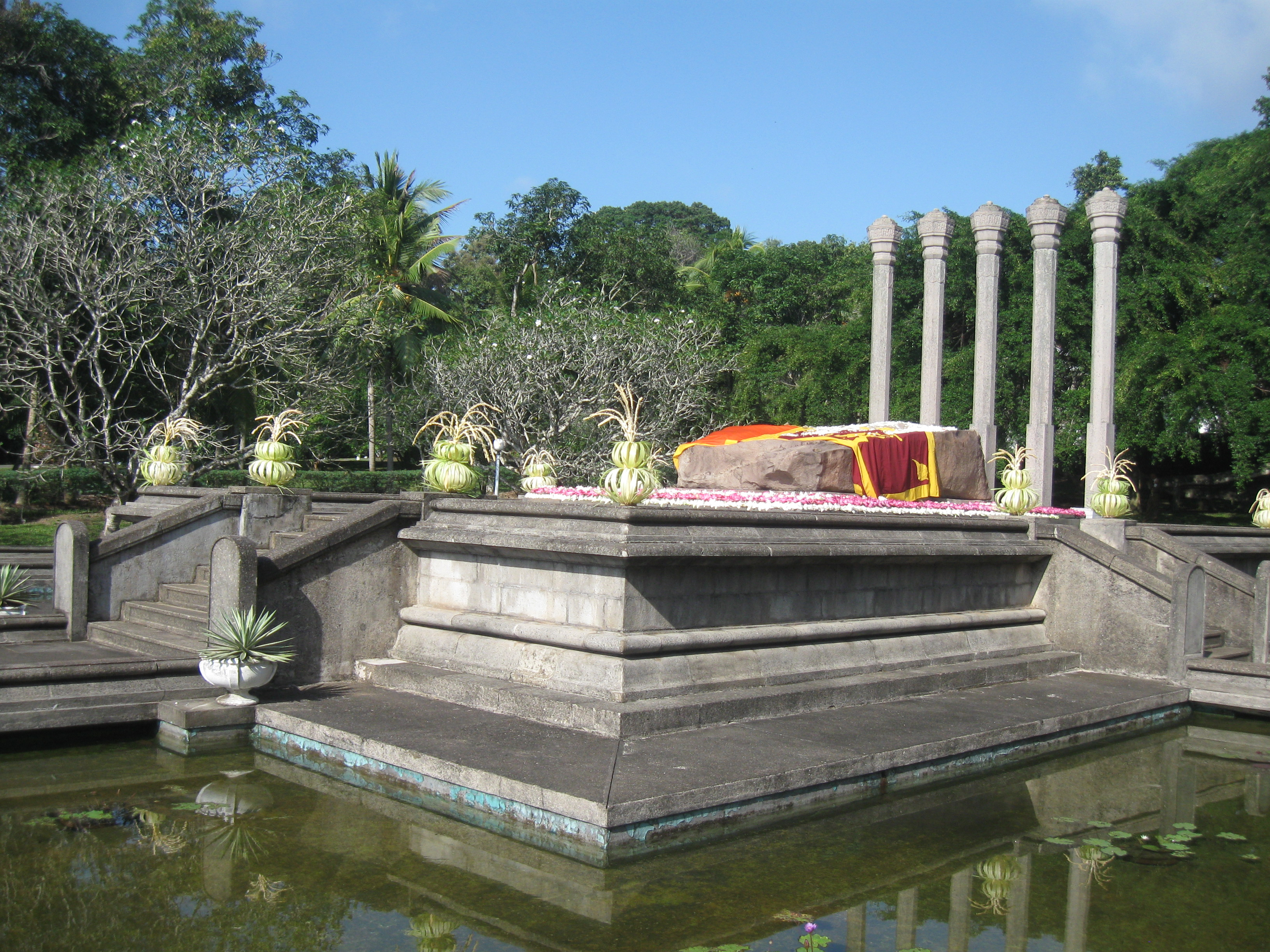
Bandaranaike Samadhi – S.W.R.D.'s tomb at Horagolla, Sri Lanka

In 1940, he married Sirima Ratwatte, daughter of Barnes Ratwatte, Rate Mahatmaya of Balangoda. Ratwattes were an old Radala family hailing from the Kingdom of Kandy and the Bandaranaike's were an old and wealthy family from the low-country which had been in service of the colonial rulers for centuries. The wedding was dubbed "the wedding of the century" and linked Bandaranaike with the Kandyan elite through marriage.

The newly married couple moved into Wentworth in Guilford Crescent, Colombo which was taken on rent from Lionel Wendt. Their first two children, Sunethra and Chandrika were born and the family stayed at Wentworth till 1946, when Sir Solomon bought a mansion at Rosmead Place, Colombo and the family settled into it. Here their only son Anura was born. Following the death of his father Sir Solomon, Bandaranaike inherited the family seat of Horagolla Walauwa in Atthanagalla. Atthanagalla became his home constituency for the future elections and remained the home constituency of his wife, daughter and son.

Sirima Ratwatte Dias Bandaranaike, as she was known after her marriage, became the first female prime minister in the world following Bandaranaike's assassination. His daughter Chandrika Kumaratunga subsequently became Prime Minister (1994) and then first female Executive president in the country; his only son Anura Bandaranaike went on to become Speaker of the Parliament of Sri Lanka (2000–01) and a Minister (2004–08); and his eldest Sunethra Bandaranaike, who followed her father's footsteps attending Oxford, became a prominent socialite.

== Legacy ==
S.W.R.D. Bandaranaike’s legacy remains a subject of significant debate in Sri Lanka. He is credited with transforming the country’s political culture by promoting the interests of the rural majority and advancing policies that reflected indigenous values and languages. His tenure marked the rise of populist politics and the empowerment of previously marginalized groups, laying the foundation for subsequent social and political reforms.

However, Bandaranaike’s policies, particularly the "Sinhala Only Act," have been widely criticized for exacerbating ethnic divisions and contributing to long-term communal tensions. His economic reforms, while intended to address social inequalities, are viewed by some historians as having led to inefficiencies and economic difficulties in the years that followed.

On 17 July 1976, a bronze statue of S. W. R. D. Bandaranaike was unveiled on Galle Face Green, it was sculpted by Lev Kerbel and gifted from the Soviet Union. The Bandaranaike Memorial International Conference Hall was gifted from the People's Republic of China in his memory in 1970 and houses the S W R D Bandaranaike Museum. The Bandaranaike International Airport, the first international airport in Ceylon was named in his honor when it was opened in 1970.

== Honours ==
- (Dominion of Ceylon) LLD (honorary) – University of Ceylon

== Electoral history ==
Electoral history of S. W. R. D. Bandaranaike
Election	Constituency	Party	Votes	Result
1931 state council	Veyangoda	Independent	Unopposed	Elected
1936 state council	Veyangoda	Independent	Unopposed	Elected
1947 parliamentary	Attanagalla	United National Party	31,463	Elected
1952 parliamentary	Attanagalla	Sri Lanka Freedom Party	38,478	Elected
1956 parliamentary	Attanagalla	Sri Lanka Freedom Party	45,016	Elected

== See also ==
- List of political families in Sri Lanka
- List of members of the Sri Lankan Parliament who died in office

== Notes ==
Political offices
Preceded by John Kotelawala	Prime Minister of Ceylon; 1956–1959	Succeeded by Wijeyananda Dahanayake
Preceded by	Leader of Sri Lanka Freedom Party; 1951–1959	Succeeded by C. P. de Silva
