= Nittambuwa =

Nittambuwa නිිට්ටඹුව நிட்டம்புவ
- Town
- Location within Sri Lanka
- Coordinates: 7°09′0″N 80°06′00″E
- Country: Sri Lanka
- Province: Western Province
- District: Gampaha District
- Time zone: UTC+5:30 (Sri Lanka Standard Time Zone)
- Postal code: 11880
- Area code: 033
- Website: www.nittambuwa.net

Nittambuwa is a semi-urban town, situated in Gampaha District, Sri Lanka. The town is situated on the Colombo-Kandy highway. It was the home town of the world's first female prime minister Sirimawo Bandaranayake.

Nittabuwa is located 15.8 km from Gampaha and about 11.1 km from Yakkala town.

== List of politicians from Nittambuwa ==
- Prime minister S. W. R. D. Bandaranaike
- Prime minister Sirimawo Bandaranayake
- President Chandrika Kumaratunga
- Speaker Anura Bandaranaike

== List of schools of Nittambuwa ==
- Sri Sanghabodhi Central College
- Bauddha Maha Vidyalaya
- Roman Catholic Kanishta Vidyalaya
- Sariputta National College Of Education
- Ranpokunagama Maha Vidyalaya
