= Sunethra Bandaranaike House =

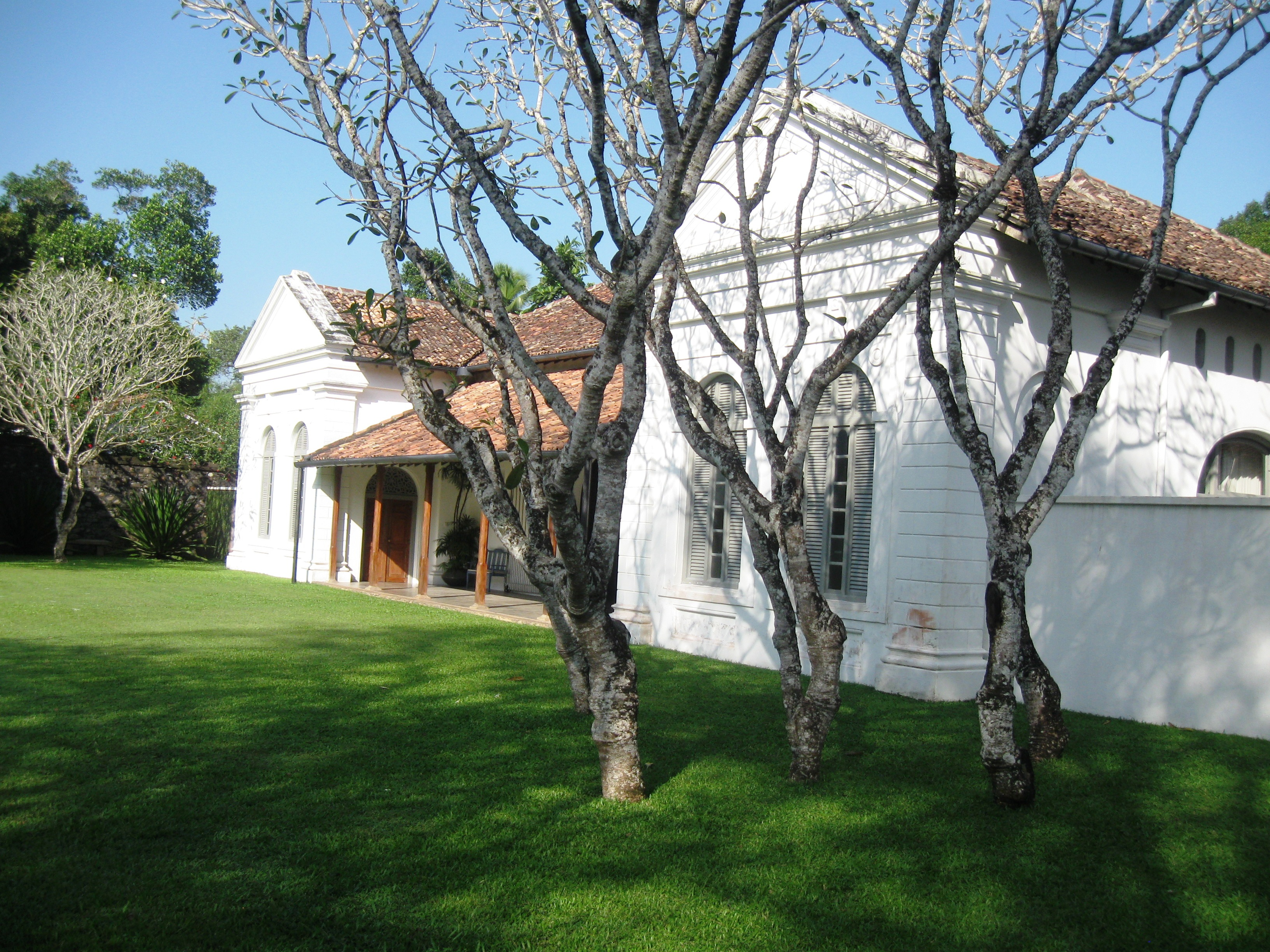
Horagolla Stables

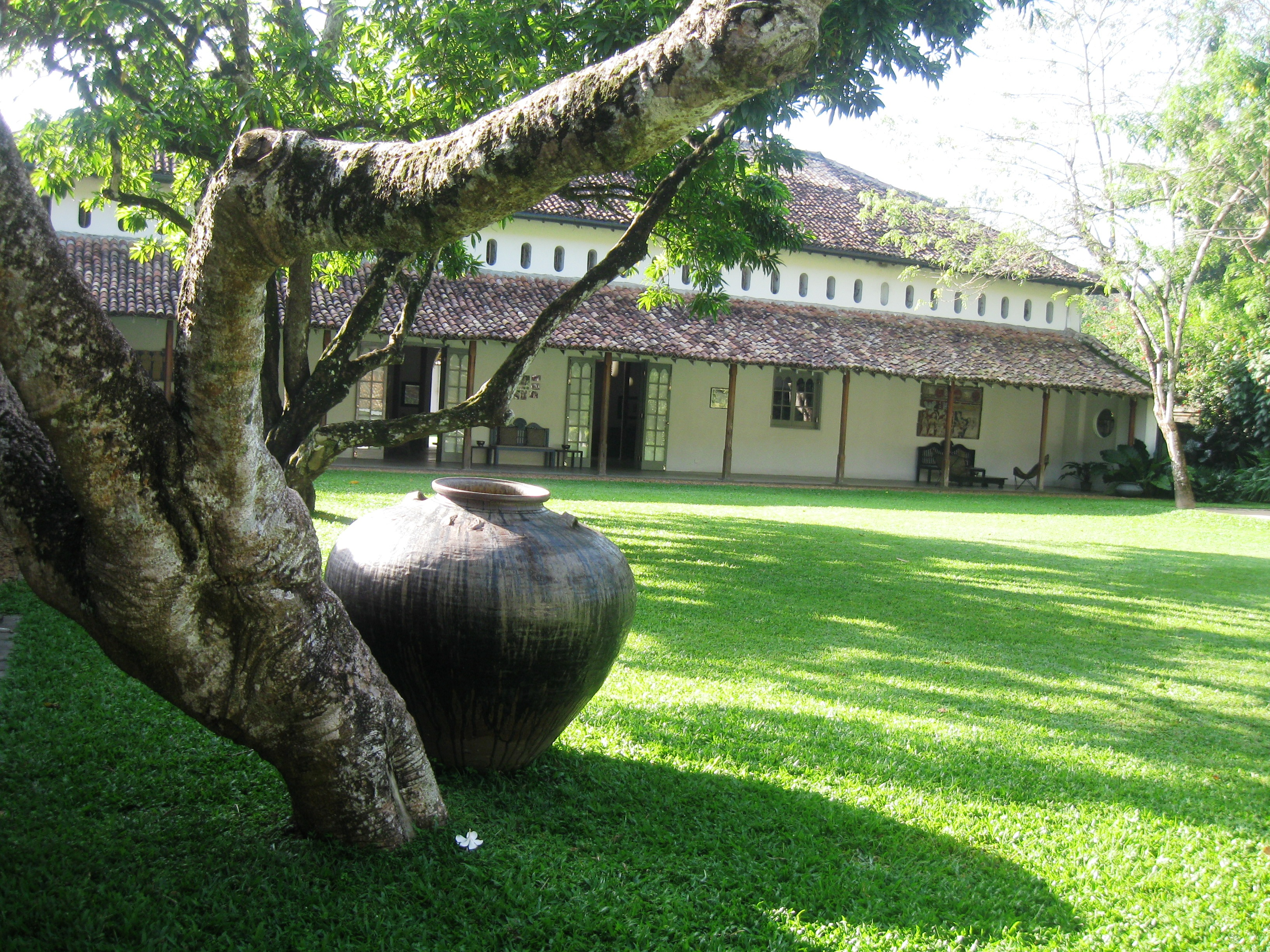
Horagolla Stables

The Sunethra Bandaranaike House or Horagolla Stables is the country house of Sunethra Bandaranaike, renovated in the 1980s by the renowned architect Geoffrey Bawa.

The house was the original walauwa of Horagolla, the home of Sunethra Bandaranaike's great-grandfather Gate Mudaliyar Don Christoffel Henricus Dias Abeywickrema Jayatilake Seneviratne Bandaranaike. It was converted to a stable by Sir Solomon Dias Bandaranaike, who after his appointment as Maha Mudaliyar (Head Mudaliyar) at the turn of the twentieth century built the Horagolla Walauwa as his stately home close to the older walauw. A walauwa is the traditional name for a headman's house.

In the 1980s the deteriorated stable building was renovated and redesigned by Geoffrey Bawa into a house for Sunethra Bandaranaike and her then husband Udaya Nanayakara. Construction commenced on 1 April 1983 and was completed 25 November 1987. The building consists of two sections; the original stables and the new wing, with these two sections forming an 'L' shape. The original building had one large arched entrance and enclosures for the six horses. Openings were introduced in the form of doors and windows and an internal mezzanine floor separates this space into a ground floor and upper gallery. The main sitting room is on the ground floor while the upper gallery provides an additional lounge/sitting area. The name boards of the horses that were kept here have been retained over their former stalls. The stable hands quarters have been converted into three bedrooms, with attached bathrooms and a library. The new wing contains an additional bedroom, with attached bathroom, dining area, pantry and open kitchen. The material used for the construction were recycled material sourced from either the original building or old demolished homes.

== See also ==
- Image Gallery of Sunethra Bandaranaike House by Sebastian Posingis
