= State Counsel (Sri Lanka) =

Public prosecutor in Sri Lanka

A State Counsel is a public prosecutor, representing the Attorney General of Sri Lanka in the legal system of Sri Lanka as well as representing the state on behalf of the Attorney General on Criminal and civil proceedings related to the state or state institutions.

State Counsels exercise the office of the Attorney General in the relevant district and or specific jurisdiction. State Counsels are not elected, and are instead public servants gazetted as Law Officers of the Attorney General's Department. Appointment of State Counsel are at the discretion of the Attorney General, from qualified Attorneys at law of the Supreme Court of Sri Lanka recognized and recommended for service by a panel of senior state officials.

State counsels, representing the Honorable Attorney General in each high court of Sri Lanka, play a crucial role in the country's criminal justice system. They wield the powers of the Attorney General within their respective jurisdictions. Without a state counsel, a high court's operations would be severely hindered, given that the majority of cases in high courts are brought forth by the Attorney General. Individuals with substantial legal expertise are carefully chosen for the position of state counsel through a highly competitive interview process, widely regarded as one of the toughest in the country.

A Senior State Counsel is the higher grade, appointed following several years of experience in the role of State Counsel.

Prior to 1972 the post was known as Crown Counsel; the name was changed when Ceylon became a republic. Crown Proctors became State Attorneys, serving as instructing attorneys for civil and criminal cases of the department.

There are similarities between the role of the State Counsel and the Procurator Fiscal in Scotland, Crown Prosecutor in England and Wales, Crown Attorneys in Canada and District Attorneys in the United States.

== See also ==
- Attorney General of Sri Lanka
- Solicitor General of Sri Lanka
- Crown Attorney
- District Attorney
