= Crown Counsel =

Crown counsel are lawyers in some countries in the Commonwealth of Nations who provide advice to the government and acts as prosecutors in cases. In various jurisdictions their title can vary and they could also be known as the Queen's Advocate, King's Advocate or Crown advocate.

In some Canadian provinces they are titled Crown attorney.

In Ceylon, following the enactment of the republican constitution, Crown Counsel were re-titled State Counsel.

In Hong Kong, following the handover of Hong Kong to China, Crown Counsel were re-titled Government Counsel.

== See also ==
- Crown attorney
- Crown advocate
