= Sunethra Bandaranaike =

Sri Lankan politician

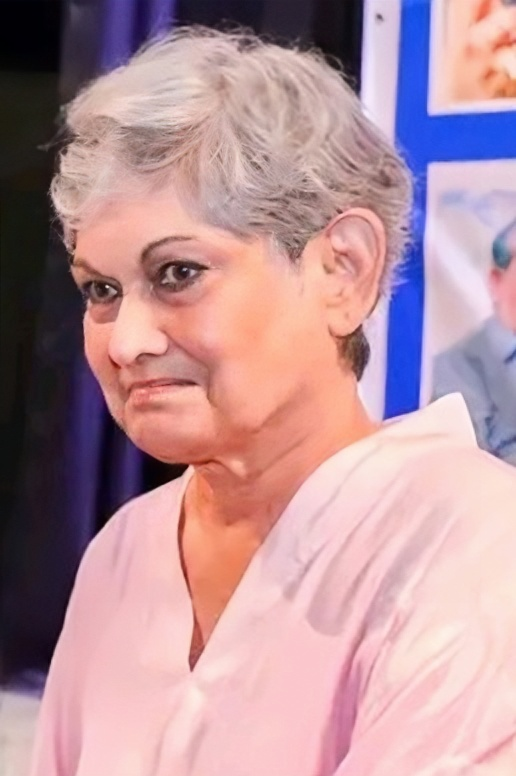
- Bandaranaike in 2024
- Born: 27 July 1943 (age 83); Colombo, Dominion of Ceylon
- Spouses: P L D RathnayakeP L D Rathnayake (m. 1962) KumarRupesinghe (m. 1972; div. 1976) marriage Udaya Nanayakkara (m. 1977; div. 1986)
- Parents: S. W. R. D. Bandaranaike; Sirimavo Bandaranaike

children education St Bridget's Convent, Colombo
Somerville College, Oxford occupation Philanthropist }}

Sunethra Dias Bandaranaike (Sinhala: සුනේත්‍රා බණ්ඩාරනායක; born 27 July 1943), is a Sri Lankan philanthropist and socialite. A member of the Bandaranaike family, she is the eldest child of former Prime Ministers S.W.R.D. Bandaranaike and Sirimavo Bandaranaike. She is the sister of former President Chandrika Kumaratunga and former Speaker of Parliament, Anura Bandaranaike.

== Early life and career ==
Sunethra Bandaranaike was born on 27 July 1943. Bandaranaike completed her schooling at St Bridget's Convent, Colombo, and received a BA in Philosophy, Politics and Economics from Somerville College, University of Oxford. She worked as a researcher in the Minority Rights Group and the Overseas Development Institute and held the post of Coordinating Secretary to the Prime Minister of Sri Lanka during her mother's tenure. She currently chairs the Sunera Foundation, a NGO which works with disabled youth and adults.

== Personal life ==
Sunethra has been married thrice. Her marriage to Kumar Rupesinghe lasted four years and her second marriage was to Udaya Nanayakkara which lasted nine years.

== 2015 presidential election speculation ==
In late 2014, Sunethra Bandaranaike was suggested in media reports as a potential common candidate for the 2015 Sri Lankan presidential election. However, she was never officially nominated and did not participate in the election.

== Gallery ==
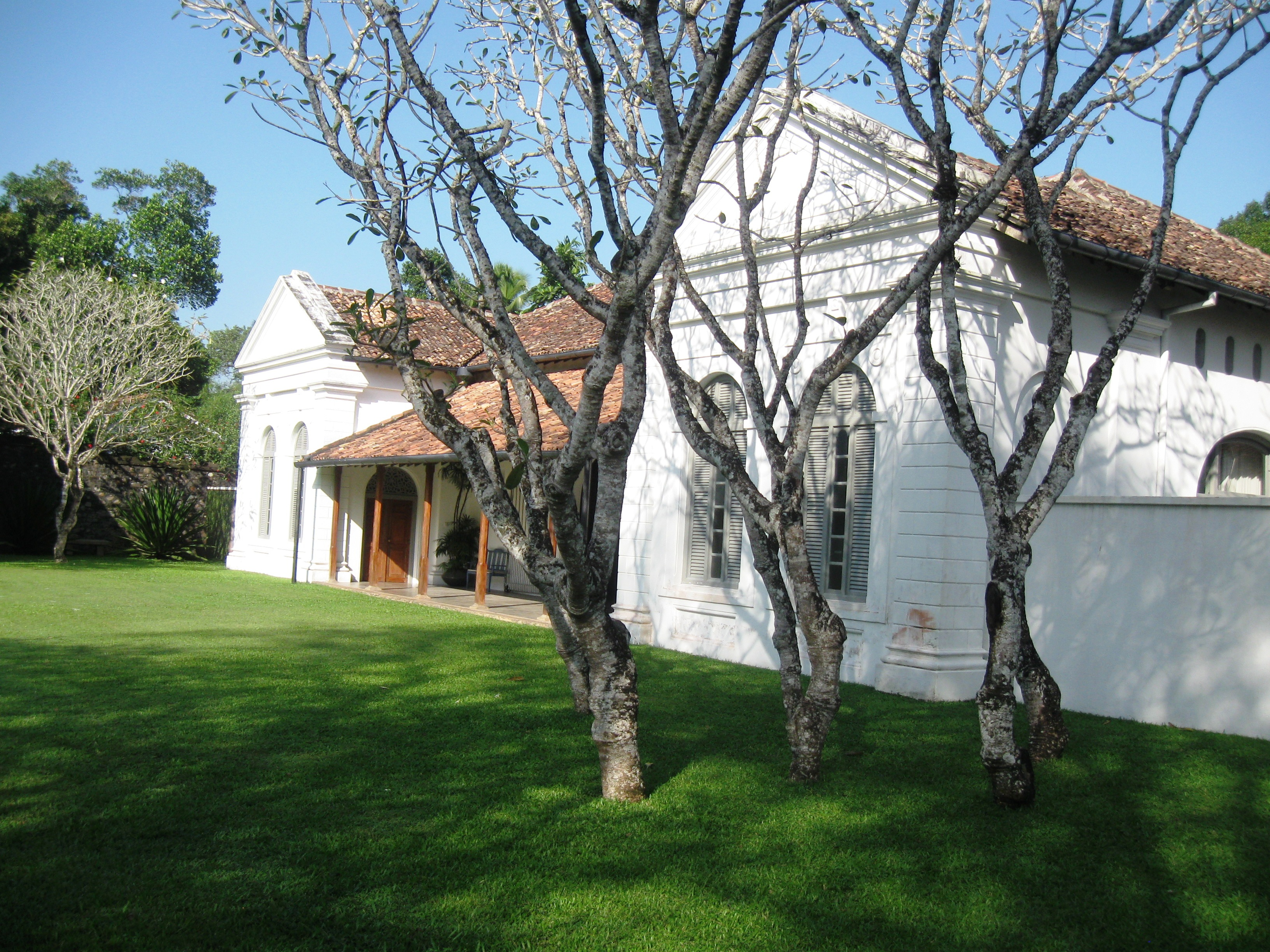
Sunethra Bandaranaike's residence at Horagolla

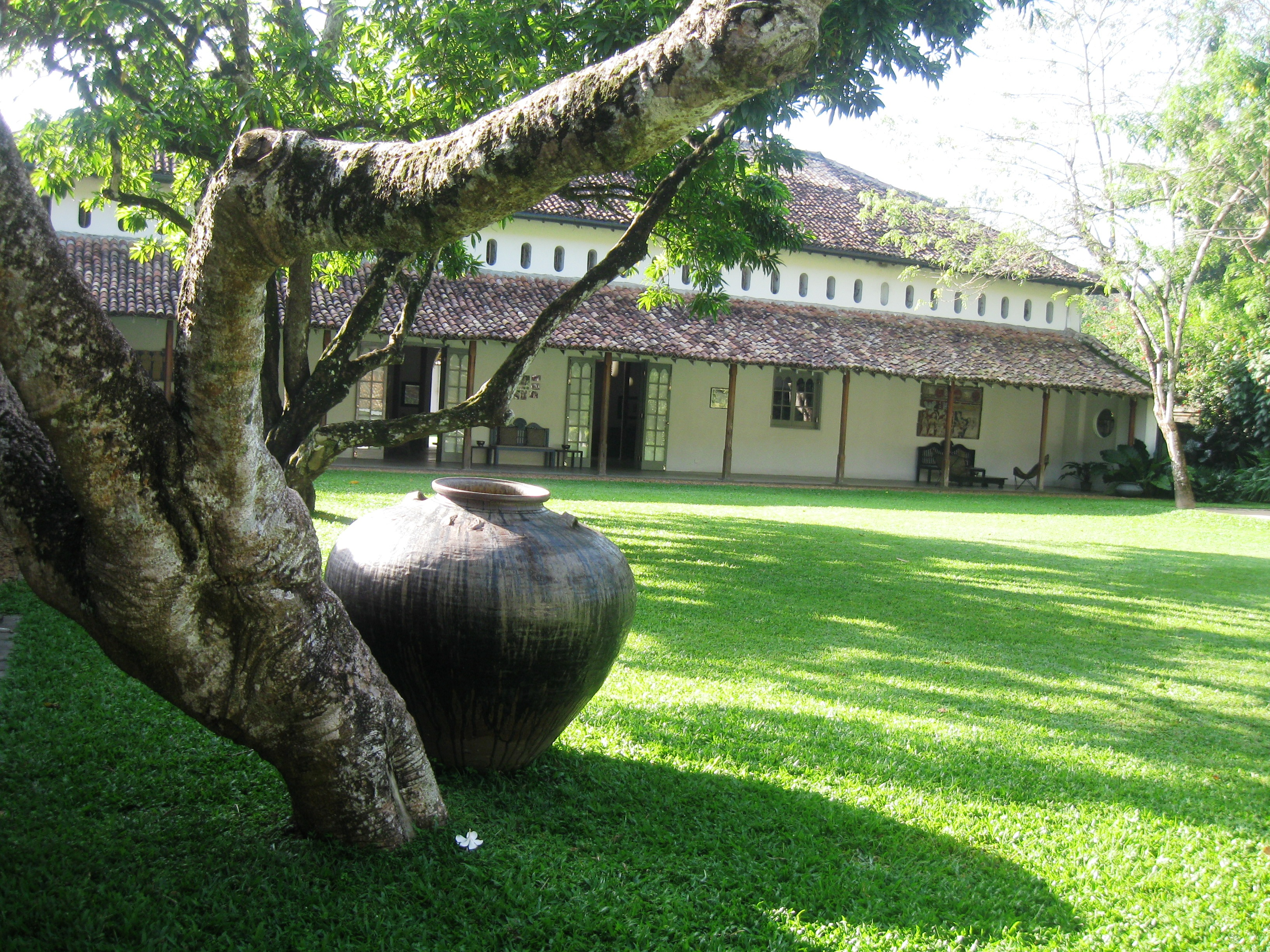
Sunethra Bandaranaike's residence at Horagolla

== See also ==
- List of political families in Sri Lanka
