= Maha Mudaliyar =

The Maha Mudaliyar (Head Mudaliyar or මහ මුදලි) was a colonial title and office in Ceylon (now Sri Lanka). Head Mudaliyar functioned as the head of the low country native headmen and native aide-de-camp to the Governor of Ceylon.

As the native headmen system became an integral part of the administration of the island under the successive European colonial powers, namely the Portuguese Empire, the Dutch East India Company and the British Empire; the colonial governors appointed a Head Mudaliyar from among the many mudaliyars. As with the role of headmen changed over the years functioning in military, policing, administrative and ceremonial capacities, the role of the Head Mudaliyar too evolved into a permanent position in the staff of the Governor. He would serve as personal translator and adviser to the Governor on native matters. Head Mudaliyar would stand behind the Governor on all state occasions, all ways standing in the presence of the Governor. He would wear a unique uniform which followed the lines of a Mudaliyar uniform and cocked hat. The last holder of the post was Sir James Peter Obeyesekere II, who held office from 1928 until his death in 1968 with no new head mudaliyars appointed thereafter.

Following the death of Maha Mudaliyar Don Conrad Peter Dias Bandaranaike Maha Mudaliyar he was succeeded by his nephew Don David De Saram. He was of the most popular and influential Maha Mudaliyars of Ceylon whose property was later donated to Rahula College, Matara. Following his death his cousin, Abraham de Saa Bandaranayake was appointed the Maha Mudaliyar. With his retirement, his cousin Don Juan Ilangakoon succeeded him as the Maha Mudaliyar for a brief period and then his son Don David Ilangakoon succeeded as the Maha Mudaliyar of Ceylon and was in office at the time of the British takeover from the Dutch. It was during this time, the then Govorner of Ceylon, Sir Frederick North was warned by the Dutch about the enormous influence of the De Saram-Ilangakoon-Bandaranayake-Obeyesekere family Dynasty.

Following the death of Maha Mudaliyar Don David Ilangakoon, his sister's son-in-law, the then Mudaliyar of Talpe Pattu, Don Philipz Ferdinandez Wijeratne Obeyesekere II was appointed the Maha Mudaliyar. Following a very brief tenure, his son Lambertus Obeyesekere took over as the Maha Mudaliyar. He was succeeded by his cousin Maha Mudaliyar Philpz Wijeyekoon Panditaratne and after his death, a cousin's son (nephew) of Maha Mudaliyar Lambertus Obeyesekere named, James Peter Obeyesekere I was appointed the Maha Mudaliyar. He was succeeded by his brother In Law, Sir Solomon Dias Bandaranaike. The last Maha Mudaliyar of Ceylon was Sir Solomon's nephew Maha Mudaliyar Sir James Peter Obeyesekere II.

== List of Head Mudaliyars ==
- Don Diaz Abeysundere Fernandez Samarakoon (Chevalier) - Head Mudaliyar of Portuguese Ceylon aka Samarakone Rala (Prior to baptism Hakmana Abeysundere Samarakone Maha Mudaiyanase Ralahami.
- Sriendra Wjeyawardene Ilangakoon (Son of Sepala Ilangakon Adigar of Kotte.
- Nicholas Dias Abeyesinghe Amarasekere (1719-1794)- Head Mudaliyar of Dutch Ceylon
- Lindren Wijeyesekere de Saram
- Earnest Wijeseyesekere de Saram
- Isaac Wijeyesiriwardene de Saram
- Johannes de Saram Wijeyesekere Abayarathne
- Abraham de Saa Wijayasekere Bandaranaike
- Jacob Ernest Wijeyesekere de Saram
- Julius Valentine de Saram
- Don Balthazar Dias Abeyesinghe
- Christoffel de Saram Wanigasekera Ekanaike
- Conrad Pieter Dias Wijewardena Bandaranaike
- Don David de Saram
- Don Juan Ilangakoon
- Don David Jayathilake Abeysiriwardhana Ilangakoon
- Don Philipz Ferdinandez Wijeratne Obeyesekere II
- Lambertus Obeyesekere
- Sir James Peter Obeyesekere I
- Sir Solomon Dias Bandaranike (1895–1928)
- Sir James Peter Obeyesekere II (1928–1968)

== See also ==
- Native headmen of Ceylon
- Ceylonese Mudaliyars
- Walauwa
- Kastane
- Adigar
