= Anura Bandaranaike =

Sri Lankan politician (1949–2008)

- අනුර බණ්ඩාරනායක அனுரா பண்டாரநாயக்க
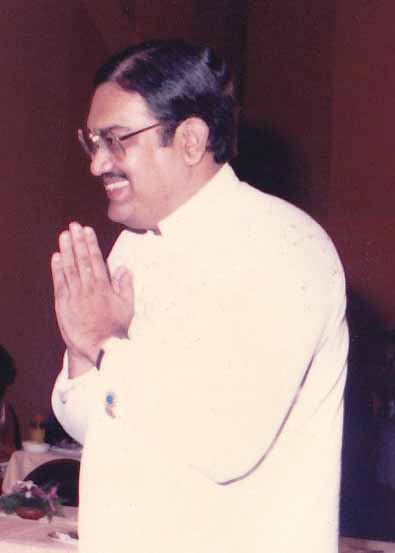

16th Speaker of the Parliament
- In office 18 October 2000 – 10 October 2001
- President: Chandrika Kumaratunga
- Prime Minister: Ratnasiri Wickremanayake
- Preceded by: Kiri Banda Ratnayake
- Succeeded by: Joseph Michael Perera

8th Leader of the Opposition
- In office 8 November 1983 – 20 December 1988
- President: J. R. Jayewardene
- Prime Minister: Ranasinghe Premadasa
- Preceded by: A. Amirthalingam
- Succeeded by: Sirimavo Bandaranaike

Minister of Foreign Affairs
- In office 22 August 2005 – 23 November 2005
- President: Chandrika Kumaratunga
- Prime Minister: Mahinda Rajapaksa
- Preceded by: Lakshman Kadirgamar
- Succeeded by: Mangala Samaraweera

Member of Parliament for Gampaha Electoral District
- In office 1989–2008
- Majority: 198,444 Preferential Votes

Member of Parliament for Nuwara Eliya-Maskeliya
- In office 21 July 1977 – 15 February 1989
- Preceded by: Constituency established
- Succeeded by: Constituency abolished

Personal details
- Born: 15 February 1949 Tintagel, Colombo, Ceylon
- Died: 16 March 2008 (aged 59) Visumpaya, Colombo, Sri Lanka
- Party: Sri Lanka Freedom Party
- Other political affiliations: United National Party (1993–2001)
- Parent(s): S. W. R. D. Bandaranaike; Sirimavo Bandaranaike
- Education: University of London, Royal College Colombo
- Occupation: Politician

Anura Priyadarshi Solomon Dias Bandaranaike (15 February 1949 – 16 March 2008) was a Sri Lankan statesman who served as Speaker of the Parliament of Sri Lanka from 2000 to 2001 and as Leader of the Opposition from 1983 to 1988. He previously held several cabinet ministries: as Foreign Minister briefly in 2005, Minister of Higher Education (1993–1994), Minister of Tourism (April 2004 – January 2007), and Minister of National Heritage (2007). He last served as a member of parliament from the opposition.

== Early life and family ==
Born on February 15, 1949, at Tintagel, Rosmead Place, Colombo to S. W. R. D. Bandaranaike and Sirimavo Bandaranaike. He was the youngest of three siblings and only son. His family has a long history in the socio-political arena of the country. His grandfather, Sir Solomon Dias Bandaranike was the Maha Mudaliyar (the chief native interpreter and advisor to the Governor) and his maternal grandfather Barnes Ratwatte Rate Mahatmaya, Dissawa of Sabaragamuwa during British colonial rule.

Bandaranaike's father Solomon West Ridgeway Dias Bandaranaike was at the time of his birth the Cabinet Minister of Health and Local Government and would become the fourth Prime Minister of Ceylon in 1956. He was assassinated on 26 September 1959, when young Anura was ten years old. His mother, took over the leadership of the Sri Lanka Freedom Party which was formed by her husband and became the first female prime minister in the world when she was appointed as Prime Minister of Ceylon in July 1960. He and his two elder sisters soon found themselves active in the party politics. His eldest sister Sunethra Bandaranaike, became a socialite and his other sister Chandrika Bandaranaike Kumaratunga, later became the President of Sri Lanka.

== Education ==
Bandaranaike completed his primary education at Royal Preparatory School and secondary education at the Royal College, Colombo where his contemporaries included Ranil Wickremesinghe and Dinesh Gunawardena. He then read Ancient and Modern History at the University of London, graduating with a BA Honours in 1973.

== Political career ==
=== Early political career ===
Anura Bandaranaike planting a sapling in the compound of the Buddhist Library at Sanchi in 1974

Bandaranaike returned to Sri Lanka in 1974, when his mother was serving her second term as prime minister. He soon became active in the Sri Lanka Freedom Party, having been appointed leader of its Youth Wing and thereafter Director of the National Youth Services Council. He contested the 1977 general election from the Maskeliya multi-seat constituency from the Sri Lanka Freedom Party. Though the Sri Lanka Freedom Party faced a crushing defeat in the election, Bandaranaike was elected to parliament. He would remain a member of parliament till his death. Following the defeat of Sri Lanka Freedom Party government in July 1977, Bandaranaike sat in the opposition in parliament with his mother. The Sri Lanka Freedom Party became a minority in the opposition and A. Amirthalingam of the Tamil United Liberation Front became the leader of the opposition.

In October 1980, following an investigation by a Special Presidential Commission appointed by President J. R. Jayawardene found corruption and abuses of power, Sirima Bandaranaike and her nephew, Felix Dias Bandaranaike had their civil liberties stripped for a period of seven years by a motion in parliament. Sirima Bandaranaike remained the party leader, but Anura Bandaranaike became the de facto leader of the Sri Lanka Freedom Party parliamentarian group.

=== Opposition leader ===
With this backdrop, Anura Bandaranaike became the leader of the opposition in November 1983, when the incumbent Amirthalingam boycotted parliament and lost his seat in October 1983 while refusing swear an oath unconditionally renouncing support for a separate state. Bandaranaike served as leader of the opposition till 1988, holding a position once held by his father and mother before him.

=== Rift within the party ===
He contested the 1989 general election from the Gampaha Electoral District, which was the traditional base of the Bandaranaike family. Elected to parliament with preferential votes over one hundred thousand, he once again sat in the opposition with his mother who had regained her civic rights and became the leader of the opposition having been elected to parliament. He soon fell out with his mother and was suspended from the family party by Sirimavo Bandaranaike. The rift was aggravated by the return to the party of his sister Chandrika Kumaratunga who had left the family party in 1984 to join the Sri Lanka Mahajana Pakshaya formed by her husband Vijaya Kumaratunga. She then went into exile in London following Kumaratunga's assassination.

=== United National Party ===
He crossed over to ruling United National Party in 1993 which appointed him Minister of Higher Education and National Reconciliation under President Dingiri Banda Wijetunge. Chandrika Kumaratunga won the 1994 general election becoming prime minister and thereafter won the presidential election to become president. Anura Bandaranaike, returned to the opposition from 1994 to 2000 as a National List member of parliament, he contested under the UNP ticket to Gampaha District at the 2000 General Elections and was reelected to the Parliament securing over 80000 preferential votes.

=== Speaker of the Parliament ===
He was elected uncontested as Speaker of the 11th Parliament and served from 18 October 2000 to 10 October 2001, when parliament was dissolved and fresh elections called.

=== Return to the Sri Lanka Freedom Party ===
He rejoined SLFP in 2001 to contest the elections in December that year, although the SLFP with its coalition faced a massive defeat Bandaranaike was elected to Parliament. When the SLFP led alliance of UPFA won the elections in 2004 with support of the JVP, Bandaranaike was reelected as a member of parliament to the Gampaha District and became Minister of Tourism, Industry and Investment in the new government. Following the assassination of foreign minister Lakshman Kadirgamar in August 2005, Bandaranaike was appointed as Foreign Minister, amidst increased tension throughout the country. He dropped his position as minister of industry and investment, but remained tourism minister. The party chose Mahinda Rajapakse over Bandaranaike as its candidate for the presidential election in 2005. Following Rajapakse's election victory it had been widely predicted that Bandaranaike would be appointed Prime Minister or remain as foreign minister. However, Rajapakse appointed Ratnasiri Wickremanayake as prime minister since many saw Bandaranaike did not co-operate in the presidential campaign. He was slowly sidelined in the party as the Rajapakse bloc grew. However he was accused of playing a "negative"/"non supportive" role in the campaign and was offered only the tourism ministry instead. Even before the presidential elections in 2005, Anura was diagnosed to have a cancer. He recovered from the initial shock of the bad news but never recovered from the shock of having to accept the toothless National Heritage Portfolio in a cabinet reshuffle in January 2007. On 9 February 2007, he was sacked as the minister of national heritage, together with ministers Mangala Samaraweera and Sripathi Sooriyarachchi after falling out with the President Mahinda Rajapakse, the party leader. Less than two weeks later, after reconciling with Rajapakse, Bandaranaike agreed to come back into the government, again being sworn in as Minister of National Heritage. On 14 December 2007 he crossed over to the opposition benches thus leaving his ministerial posts. Despite being in politics for over a quarter of a century, he has only been in a governing side for about 5 years.

== Personal life ==
=== Friendship with Benazir Bhutto ===
Bandaranaike had a longstanding personal friendship with Pakistani stateswoman and former Prime Minister Benazir Bhutto. He first met her in 1964, when she accompanied her father, Zulfikar Ali Bhutto, who was then Pakistan's Foreign Minister, on a visit to Sri Lanka during the premiership of Bandaranaike's mother, Sirimavo Bandaranaike. The two subsequently met on several occasions and developed a close friendship, sharing common interests in politics, literature, theatre and the arts. In 1997, Bhutto visited Sri Lanka at Bandaranaike’s invitation to attend celebrations marking his twentieth year in Parliament. During her four-day stay in Colombo, she delivered a speech at the Bandaranaike Memorial International Conference Hall (BMICH). Bandaranaike also accompanied her during her visit, including shopping trips to Odel. He later recalled her as having a bohemian personality, a wide range of interests and a considerable sense of humour.

Bandaranaike also met Bhutto in Pakistan while attending the Zulfikar Ali Bhutto Memorial Lecture. On that occasion, he recalled her spontaneously suggesting a stop at a bookshop and subsequently wanting to visit a nearby coffee shop, despite the large crowds of supporters gathered outside. Their final meeting took place in Dubai approximately six months before her assassination in December 2007. Bhutto telephoned Bandaranaike and invited him to a dinner gathering attended by approximately forty guests. During their conversation, she spoke optimistically about her plans to return to Pakistan. Bandaranaike later recalled warning her about the dangers of returning under the military government of President Pervez Musharraf. Bandaranaike alleged that Bhutto's assassination was directly linked to the Pakistani president.

Following Bhutto's death on 27 December 2007, Bandaranaike expressed profound sadness at her death. He praised her courage, political commitment and dedication to democracy, recalling the personal hardships she had endured following the execution of her father, Zulfikar Ali Bhutto, and the subsequent difficulties faced by her family. He also admired her ability to remain optimistic despite years of political persecution and personal tragedy. Bandaranaike remembered Bhutto as an intelligent, lively and courageous woman with a keen interest in regional affairs, particularly the political and nuclear tensions between India and Pakistan. He described her death as a significant loss for Pakistan and South Asia. Recalling Bhutto's 1997 visit to Sri Lanka, Bandaranaike particularly remembered a remark she had made during her speech: “Anura, it is long enough we have met in opposition, it’s time we met in government.” Bandaranaike later reflected that the political meeting they had anticipated would never take place.

== Electoral history ==
Parliamentary Election
Year	Constituency	Position	Party	Alliance	Votes	%	+/-	Result
1977	Nuwara Eliya-Maskeliya	Member of Parliament	Sri Lanka Freedom Party		48,776	30.33%	30.33	Elected
1989	Gampaha District	Member of Parliament	Sri Lanka Freedom Party		107,177	36.39%	36.39	Elected
2000	Gampaha District	Member of Parliament	United National Party		99,536	26.30%	▼10.09	Elected
2001	Gampaha District	Member of Parliament	Sri Lanka Freedom Party	People's Alliance	265,160	55.41%	▲29.11	Elected
2004	Gampaha District	Member of Parliament	Sri Lanka Freedom Party	United People's Freedom Alliance	198,444	38.91%	▼16.50	Elected

== Death ==
Bandaranaike died on 16 March 2008 at Visumpaya, his official residence in Colombo, following a period of prolonged illness due to cancer. He had been diagnosed with cancer a few years before his death and had been hospitalized for several months. A few weeks prior to his death, he had taken three months leave from parliament.

== See also ==
- List of political families in Sri Lanka
- List of members of the Sri Lankan Parliament who died in office

Political offices
Preceded by K. B. Ratnayake	Speaker of the Parliament; 2000–2001	Succeeded by Joseph Michael Perera
Preceded by Lakshman Kadirgamar	Minister of Foreign Affairs of Sri Lanka; 2005	Succeeded by Mangala Samaraweera
