= Udurawana =

Coordinates: 7°21′N 80°40′E

- Village
- Interactive map of Udurawana
- Country: Sri Lanka
- Province: Central Province
- Time zone: UTC+5:30 (Sri Lanka Standard Time)

Udurawana is a village in Pathadumbara Divisional Secretariat, within Kandy District, within Central Province in Sri Lanka. Nearest town is Wattegama.

== Notable people ==
- Heen Banda Udurawana, the 16th Diyawadana Nilame of the Temple of the Sacred Tooth Relic.

== See also ==
- List of towns in Central Province, Sri Lanka
