= Anuradha Dullewe Wijeyeratne =

Sri Lankan politician

Anuradha Dullewe Wijeyeratne අනුරාධ දූල්ලෑව විජයරත්න
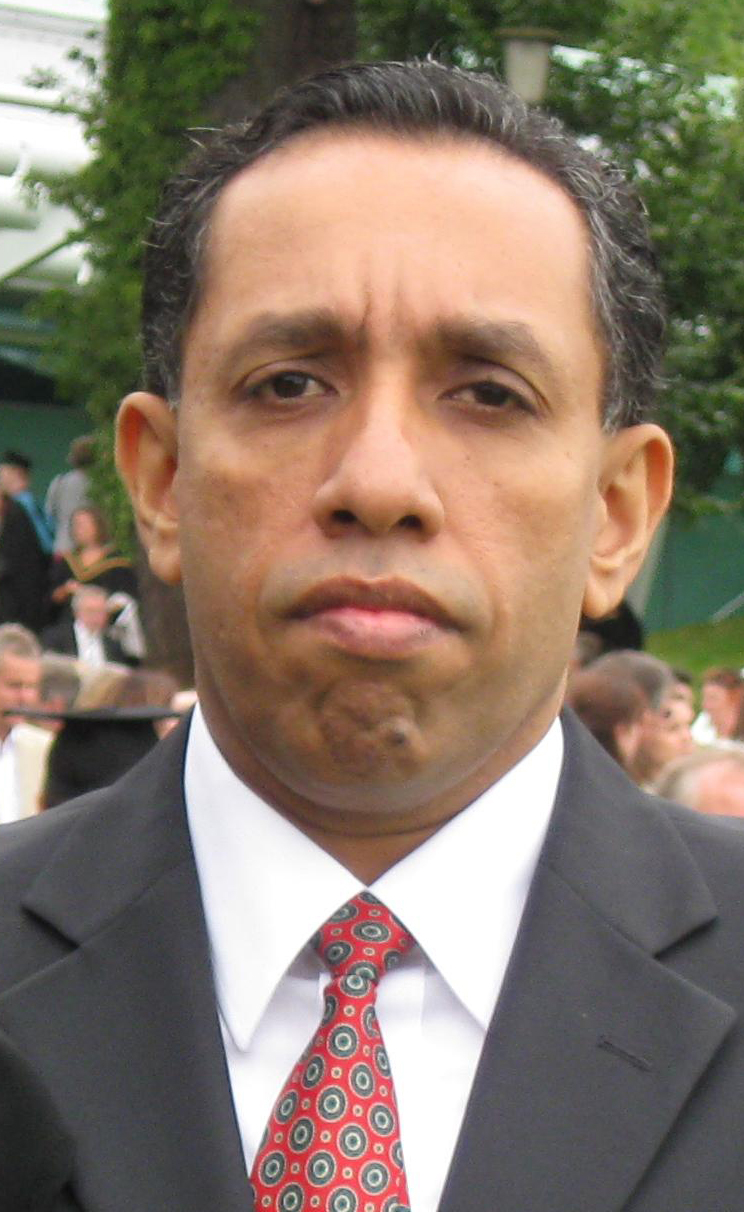

Diyawadana Nilame of the Temple of the Sacred Tooth Relic Acting
- In office 1975–2005

Councillor of Sabaragamuwa Provincial Council
- In office 1988–1993

Coordinating secretary to Ministry of Justice

Public relations officer Ministry of Higher Education

Personal details
- Born: 22 March 1962 (age 64) Anuradhapura, Sri Lanka
- Party: United National Party
- Spouse(s): Dayanganie Dullewe Wijeyeratne (née Gunasekara)
- Children: Yanushi
- Parent(s): Nissanka Wijeyeratne (father); Nita Wijeyeratne (née Dullewe) (mother)
- Education: Royal College, Colombo; Kingswood College, Kandy; D. S. Senanayake College, Colombo
- Occupation: Politician and entrepreneur

Anuradha Neelendra Dullewe Wijeyeratne (Sinhala: අනුරාධ නිලේන්ද්‍ර දූල්ලෑව විජයරත්න) (born 22 March 1962), known as Anuradha Dullewe Wijeyeratne, is a Sri Lankan politician and entrepreneur. He has served as the acting Diyawadana Nilame (chief lay custodian) of the Sri Dalada Maligawa, Kandy on several occasions for three decades, appointed by the commissioner general of Buddhist Affairs with recommendation from Mahanayaka Theras of the Malwatte and Asgiriya chapters of Siam Nikaya. He was a provincial councillor of the Sabaragamuwa Provincial Council as well.

In March 2020, he was invited by the United National Party to contest the parliamentary general election, and was appointed as the chief organizer for the Mawanella electorate. In the 2020 general elections, Wijeyeratne ran unsuccessfully for the Kegalle District seat in Parliament. He is ideologically positioned on the right wing of the United National Party.

== Early life and education ==
Wijeyeratne was born on 22 March 1962 in Anuradhapura to a prominent political family who had been in active politics in the country for nine decades, since 1931. He is the third son of Nissanka Wijeyeratne and Nita Wijeyeratne (née Dullewe). He has three brothers and a sister: Neranjan, Mano, Lankesh and Nishangani. His father, Nissanka, and grandfather, Sir Edwin Wijeyeratne, were prominent politicians who became cabinet ministers.

Wijeyeratne was educated at Royal College, Colombo, before moving to Kingswood College, Kandy and later D. S. Senanayake College, Colombo.

== Political career ==
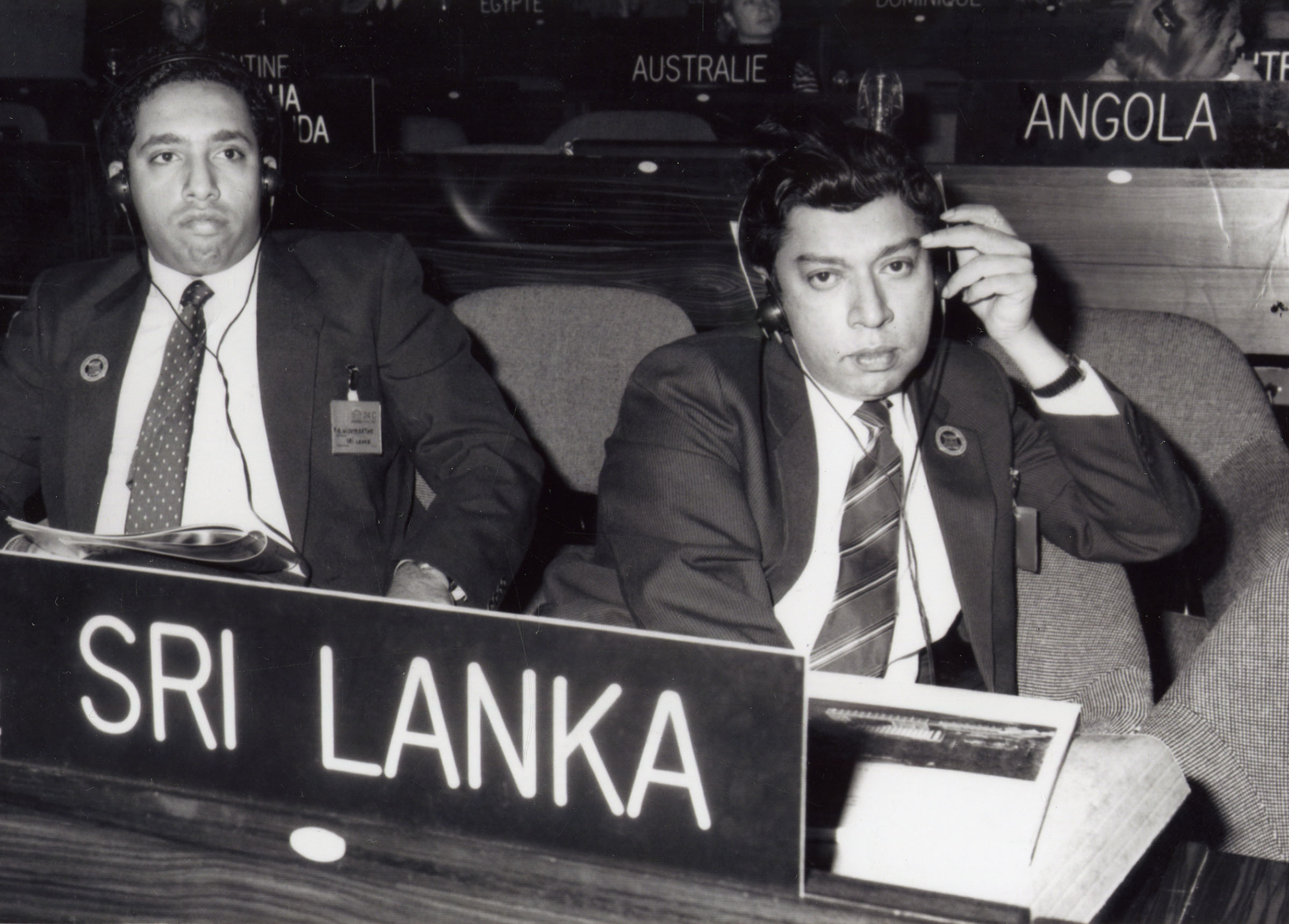
Wijeyeratne, coordinating secretary, Ministry of Justice, with Dr. A. R. B. Amarasinghe, secretary, Ministry of Justice, at the 1987 UNESCO General Conference in France

Wijeyeratne entered active politics in 1984 from the United National Party's Samavadhi Student Union. He also served as a member of the United National Party National Executive Committee. He contested the provincial council elections in 1988, and was elected to the Sabaragamuwa Provincial Council. He also served as the public relations officer of the Ministry of Higher Education and coordinating secretary to the Ministry of Justice. He was a member of the Sri Lanka Government Delegation to the UNESCO 1979 Regional Conference in Geneva, Switzerland, a member of the Sri Lankan Government Delegation in 1983 for the Commonwealth Sri Lanka festival held in London, member of the Government Delegation for the 1983 International Peace Conference, Hiroshima, Japan, a member of the Sri Lanka Government Delegation to UNESCO 1985 General Conference in Sofia, a member of Sri Lanka Government Delegation to UNESCO 1987 General Conference in Paris, France, and a member of Sri Lanka Government Delegation to 1993 Asia Local Government Conference in Kyoto, Japan. Wijeyeratne also served as the chairman of Dedigama Electorate Development Planning Committee.

== Family ==
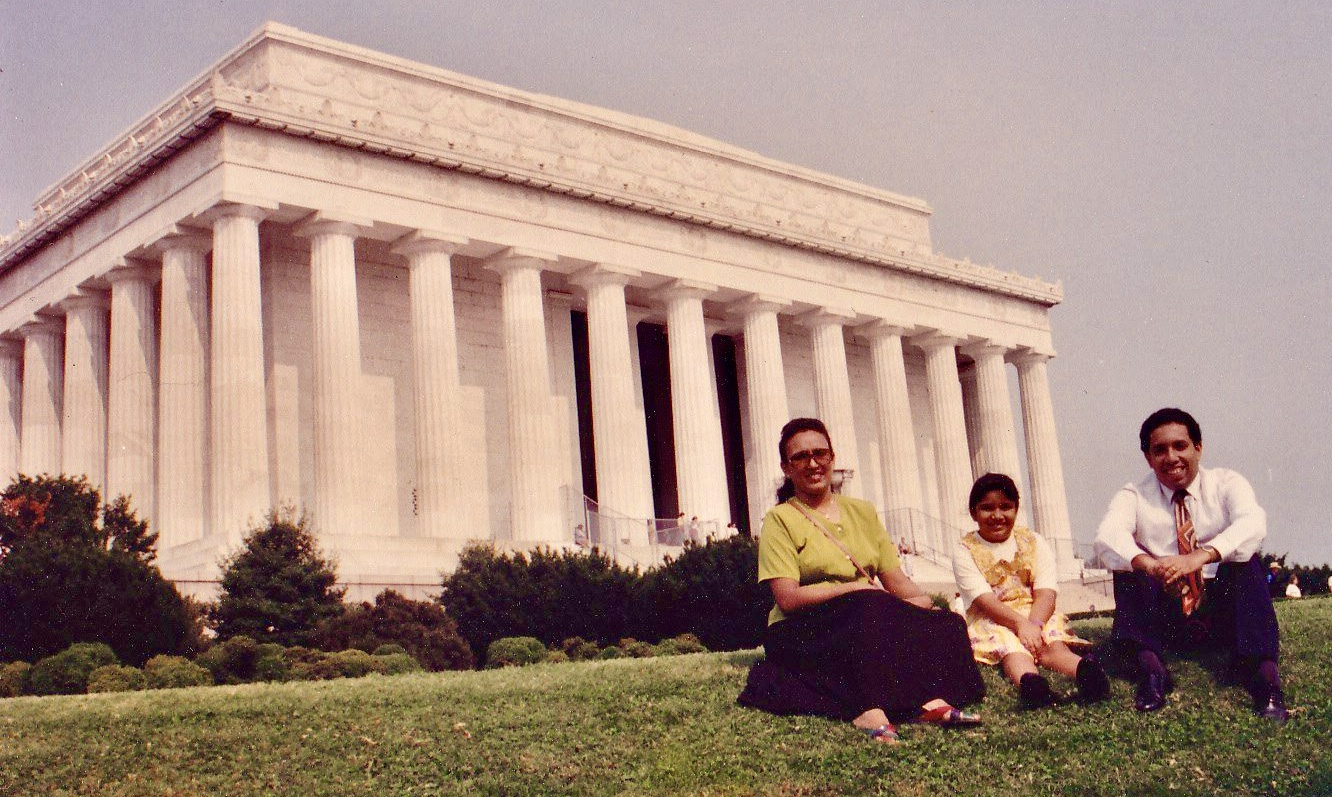
Wijeyeratne with his wife Dayanganie and daughter Yanushi at the Lincoln Memorial Washington DC, USA in the summer of 1990

Wijeyeratne is married to Dayanganie, daughter of Tudor Gunasekara (former minister and diplomat) and Chandra Gunasekara (née Perera). Anuradha and Dayanganie have a daughter Yanushi.

== See also ==
- List of political families in Sri Lanka
