= Hean =

Hean may refer to:

- Alexander Hean (1859–1927), Scottish-born Australian politician
- Brenda Hean (1910–1972), Australian politician
- Cheong Koon Hean (born 1957), Singaporean urban planner and architect
- Hean Sahib (born 1962), Cambodian economist and government minister
- Hean Tat Keh, professor of marketing at Monash University
- Loh Kean Hean (born 1995), Malaysia-born Singaporean badminton player
- Teo Chee Hean (born 1954), Singaporean politician

== See also ==
- Heen
