= Heen =

Heen is a surname and given name. Notable people with this name include:

== Surname ==
- Arne Randers Heen (1905–1991), Norwegian mountain climber and member of the Norwegian resistance
- Sheila Heen, American author, educator and public speaker
- Walter Heen (born 1928), American lawyer, politician and judge

== Given name ==
- Heen Banda Dissanayaka (28 August 1937 — 5 March 2023), Sri Lankan civil servant
- Heen Banda Udurawana (1900–1989), Sri Lankan politician

== See also ==
- Hean (disambiguation)
