= Heen Banda Udurawana =

Sri Lankan politician (1900–1989)

- හීන් බංඩා උඩුරාවන
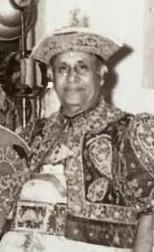

16th Diyawadana Nilame of the Temple of the Sacred Tooth Relic
- In office 1964–1975
- Preceded by: Harris Leuke Ratwatte
- Succeeded by: Nissanka Wijeyeratne

Member of Senate
- In office 1967–1971

Personal details
- Born: 15 December 1900 Udurawana, Wattegama
- Died: 31 August 1989 (aged 88)
- Party: United National Party

Heen Banda Udurawana (15 December 1900 – 31 August 1989) was a member of the Senate of Ceylon and 16th Diyawadana Nilame of the Temple of the Tooth, Kandy.

Born at Udurawana, Wattegama; he was educated at Christ Church College, Wattegama and at the School of Agriculture, Alawatugoda. He became a planter, businessman, contractor and transport agent.

He was elected to the Kandy Municipal Council in 1948 and served as Deputy Mayor and acted as Mayor on certain occasions. From 1967 to 1971, he was a member of the Senate of Ceylon.

In 1948, was elected Basnayaka Nilame of Saman Devalaya, Alawatugoda and later became the Basnayaka Nilame of the Natha Devale in Kandy in 1958. He was elected the 16th Diyawadana Nilame, the lay custodian of the Sacred Tooth Relic in 1964 and held it till 1975, when he was succeeded by Nissanka Wijeyeratne.

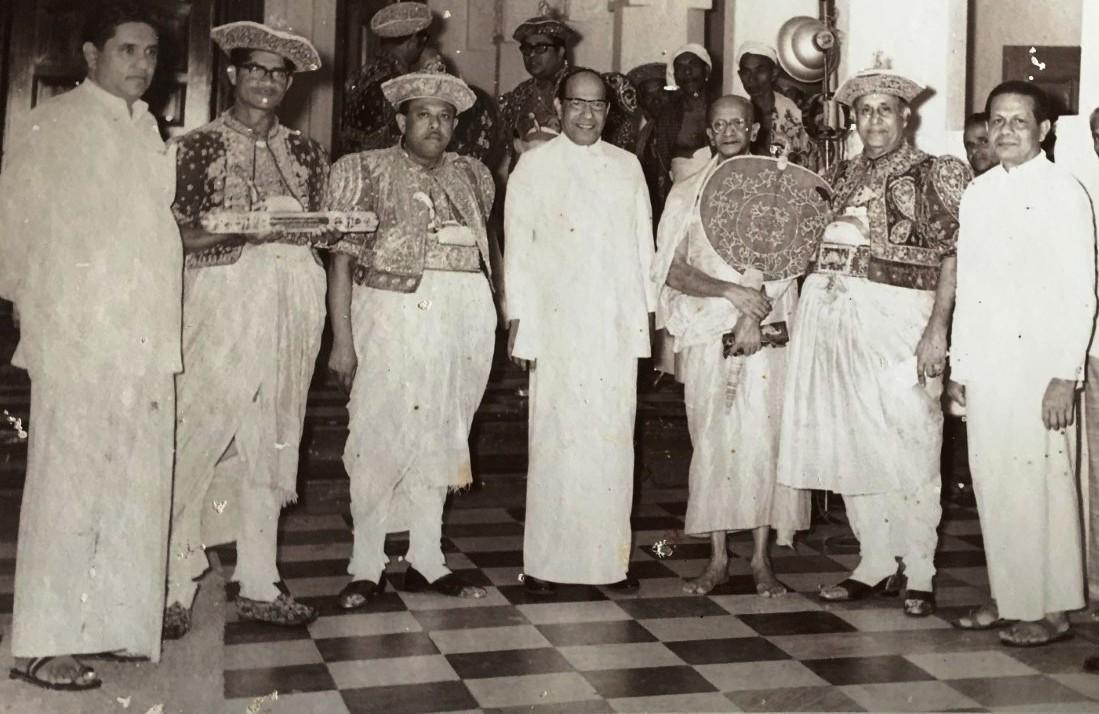
Photograph was taken in 1973 at Sri Dalada Maligawa. Most Venerable Sirimalwatte Ananda Mahanayaka Thero of the Malwatta, President of Sri Lanka William Gopallawa, Diyawadana Nilame H.B. Udurawana, Cultural Affairs Minister S.S. Kulatileke, Information-Broadcasting-Transport and Cultural Affairs Ministry Permanent Secretary Nissanka Wijeyeratne, Basnayaka Nilame of Pattini Devalaya Kandy H.M Navaratne and Basnayaka Nilame S.B. Udurawana are in the picture.

== See also ==
- Diyawadana Nilame, Sri Dalada Maligawa, Kandy

== References and External links ==
- Official Website
- WorldGenWeb Website
- Daily News Newspaper
- The Island Newspaper
