= Emblem of Sri Lanka =

Emblem of Sri Lanka ශ්‍රී ලංකාවේ ජාතික ලාංඡනය இலங்கையின் தேசிய சின்னம்
- Armiger: Democratic Socialist Republic of Sri Lanka
- Adopted: 1972
- Crest: A Dharmachakra azure on a bezant
- Shield: On a circular shield: Maroon, a lion passant Or bearing a Sri Lankan sword Or in its right forepaw; an orle enhanced azure bearing concentrically from the center outwards two annulets argent, the petals of a golden water lily proper, and an annulet Or; a bordure Or
- Supporters: Golden symbols of the Sun and the Moon; the stalks of rice growing from the vase surrounding the shield
- Compartment: A traditional grain vase
- Other elements: An annulet or passing under the crest and vase surrounding the stalks of rice; a bordure azure surrounding the entire arms

The National Emblem of Sri Lanka is used by the State of Sri Lanka and the Government of Sri Lanka in connection with the administration and government of the country. The current emblem has been in use since 1972 and created under the ideas and guidance of Nissanka Wijeyeratne. At the time, he was Permanent Secretary to the Ministry of Cultural Affairs and Chairman of the National Emblem and Flag Design Committee. The designer of the emblem was Venerable Mapalagama Wipulasara Maha Thera, and the artwork was by S. M. Seneviratne.

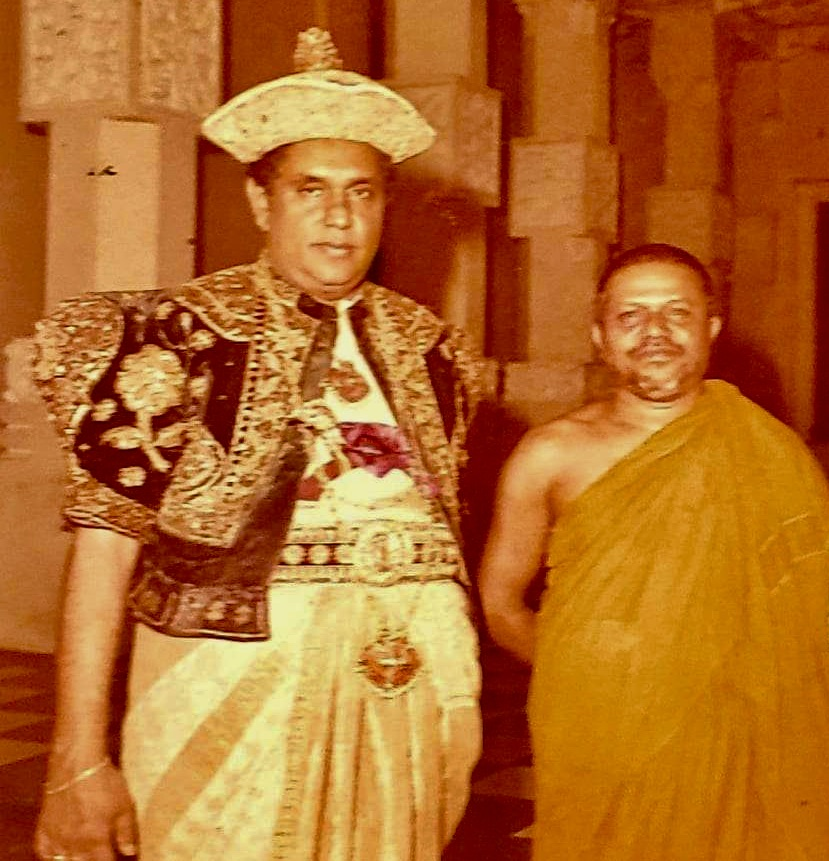
Nissanka Wijeyeratne with Designer national emblem of Sri Lanka Venerable Mapalagama Wipulasara Maha Thera

The emblem features a gold lion passant, holding a sword in its right fore paw (the same lion from the flag of Sri Lanka) in the centre on a maroon background surrounded by golden petals of a Blue Lotus the national flower of the country. This is placed on top of a traditional grain vase that sprouts sheaves of rice grains that circle the border reflecting prosperity.

== History ==
=== Portuguese period in Ceylon ===
The Portuguese had a coat of arms for their occupied territory in Sri Lanka, around 1505–1658. It has an elephant in the foreground, with palm trees around it and high mountains in the background.

=== Dutch period in Ceylon ===
It is not known when the coat of arms for the Dutch-occupied territory of Sri Lanka was adopted. The coat of arms is from a manuscript dating from 1717 to 1720. The arms are very similar to the previous Portuguese one, with a modified design. It shows the geography of the island, with mountains and palm trees, an elephant and cinnamon bales, and two small shields. The elephant is used because it is an animal used for work on the island, and it symbolises strength. In front of the elephant are three bales of cinnamon, as it was the main export product at the time, and the elephant holds a cinnamon branch in its trunk.

=== British Ceylon ===
Before independence, Ceylon used the coat of arms of the United Kingdom as the imperial emblem and a unique shield for the colony. This contained a Sri Lankan Elephant and coconut trees, and later a stupa.

=== Dominion of Ceylon ===
Shield of Ceylon

When Ceylon was granted independence from Britain as a dominion in 1948, the need for a new national emblem arose. A committee was appointed in order to create a national emblem. According to its recommendation, a national emblem was adopted in 1954. The island had been a British Crown Colony since 1802. The emblem was not strictly in the heraldic tradition; however, it was granted by the College of Arms in 1954. It was derived from the Royal Banner of the Kandyan Kingdom. It largely reflected the Buddhist traditions of the Sinhalese people. At its center was a disk with a gold lion passant holding a sword (here called the Ceylon lion) in its right fore paw, on a maroon background, taken from the Royal Banner of the Kandyan Kingdom. Around it were the golden petals of a water lily, and it was topped with the crown ensigning the roundel, called the Ceylon crown; it follows the design of the crown worn by the kings of Kandy. The crown symbolised Queen Elizabeth II as head of state of Ceylon, and it disappeared from the country's arms after the change of status to a republic.

=== Sri Lanka ===
The present emblem was created in 1972 with the ideas and guidance of Nissanka Wijeyeratne. At the time, he was Permanent Secretary to the Ministry of Cultural Affairs and Chairman of the National Emblem and Flag Design Committee. The designer of the emblem was Venerable Mapalagama Wipulasara Maha Thera and the artwork was by S.M. Seneviratne. The emblem features a gold lion passant, holding a sword in its right fore paw (the same lion from the flag of Sri Lanka) in the centre on a maroon background, surrounded by golden petals of a Blue Lotus, the national flower of the country. This is placed on top of a traditional grain vase that sprouts sheaves of rice grains that circle the border, reflecting prosperity.

The crest is the Dharmacakra, symbolizing the country's foremost place for Buddhism and just rule. Traditional Sinhalese heraldic symbols for the sun and the moon form the supporters.

== Historical coats of arms ==
Coat of arms of Sri Lanka	Description	Dates Used
	Coat of arms of the Portuguese period in Ceylon Later reused in the early stages of British rule in Ceylon These arms were also used by the Dominion of Ceylon until 1954	1505–1658 (1796–1875) (1948–1954)
	Coat of arms of the Dutch period in Ceylon	1602–1796
	Emblem used in the later stages of British Ceylon	1875–1948
	Emblem of the Dominion of Ceylon	1954–1972

== See also ==
- Flag of Sri Lanka
- Sri Lanka Matha, national anthem of Sri Lanka
- Mapalagama Wipulasara Maha Thera
