= Neranjan Wijeyeratne =

Sri Lankan religious leader and politician

Neranjan Wijeyeratne නෙරංජන් විජයරත්න
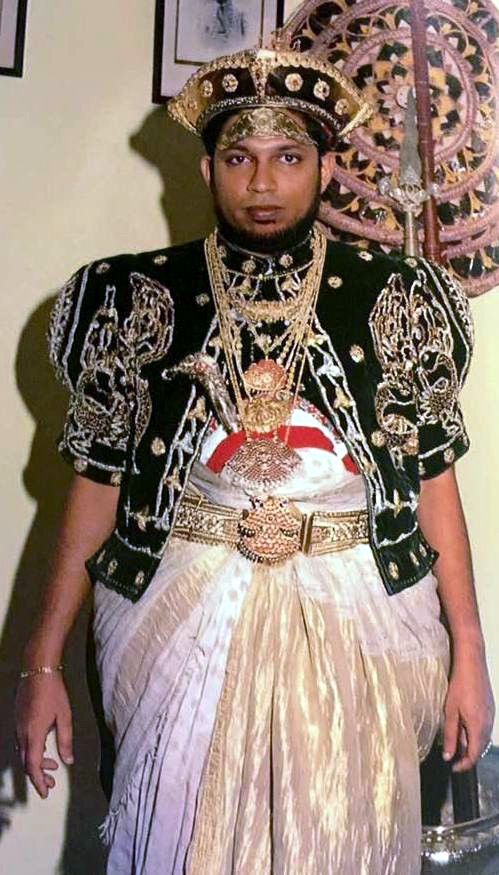

18th Diyawadana Nilame of the Temple of the Sacred Tooth Relic
- In office 1985–2005
- Preceded by: Nissanka Wijeyeratne
- Succeeded by: Pradeep Nilanga Dela

Basnayake Nilame of Lankathilaka Maha Vishnu Devalaya
- In office 1981–1985

Leader of the Opposition in the Kandy Municipal Council
- In office 2011–2015

Personal details
- Born: 9 August 1956 (age 70) Kandy, Sri Lanka
- Party: United National Party
- Spouse(s): Devika Wijeyeratne (née Mediwake)
- Children: Mokshana and Navindra
- Parent(s): Nissanka Wijeyeratne (father); Nita Wijeyeratne (née Dullewe) (mother)
- Education: Royal College, Colombo

Neranjan Priyadarshana Dullewe Wijeyeratne (Sinhala: නෙරංජන් ප්‍රියදර්ශන දූල්ලෑව විජයරත්න) (born 9 August 1956) (known as Neranjan Wijeyeratne) is a Sri Lankan. He served as 18th Diyawadana Nilame (chief lay custodian) of the Sri Dalada Maligawa, Kandy for 20 years from 1985 to 2005. Wijeyeratne was former United National Party politician and ex chief organiser for the Galagedara Electorate in Kandy District and former Leader of the Opposition in the Kandy Municipal Council.

== Early life ==
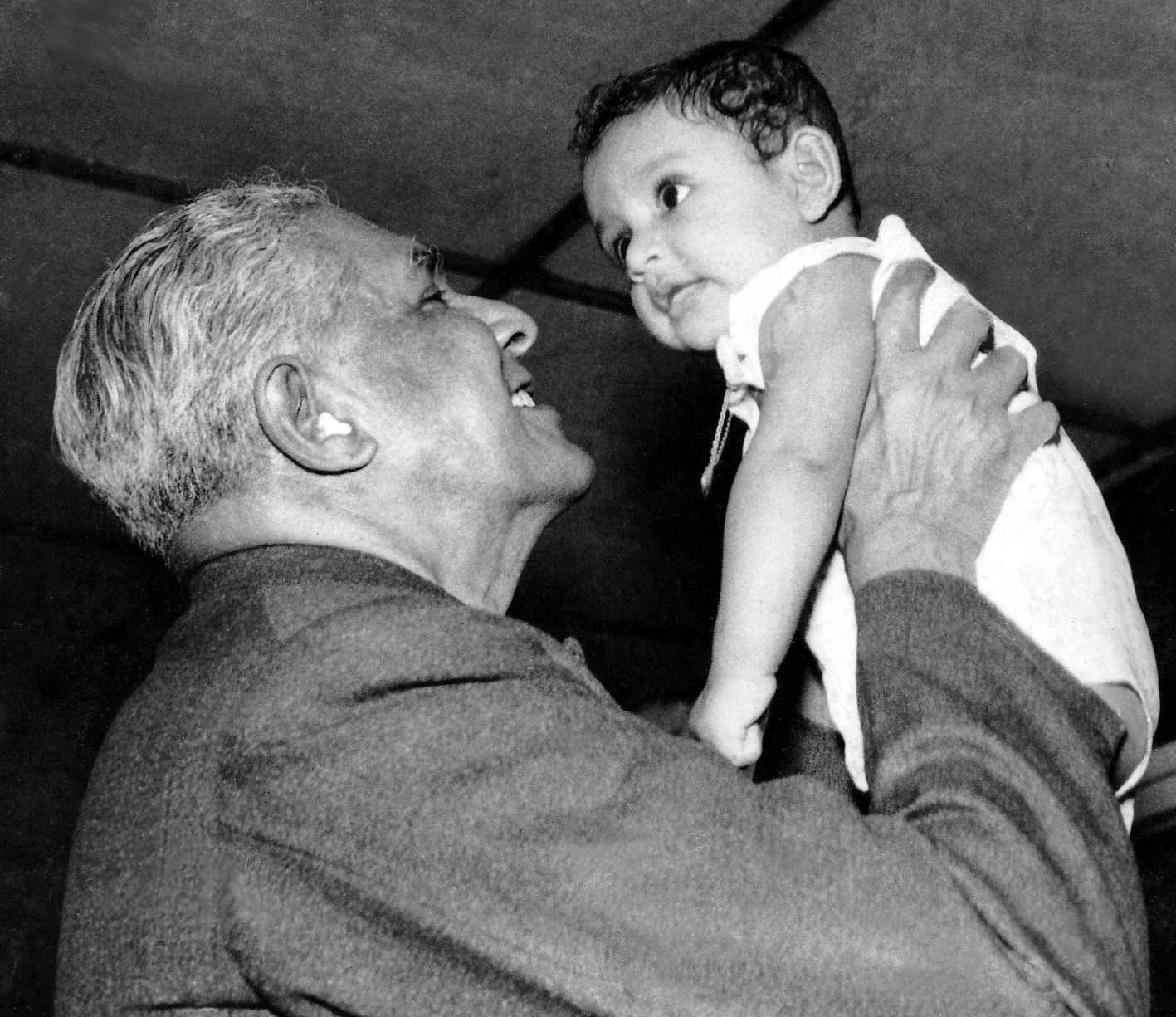
Neranjan with his grandfather Sir Edwin Wijeyeratne (former Cabinet Minister of Home Affairs and Rural Development) in the mid-1950s

Born to Nissanka Wijeyeratne and Nita Dullewe Wijeyeratne, he is the eldest of three brothers and a sister. They are Mano, Anuradha, Lankesh and Nishangani. His father Nissanka Wijeyeratne and grandfather Sir Edwin Wijeyeratne were prominent politicians who had become cabinet ministers and his brothers Mano was a Non-Cabinet Minister of Enterprise Development and Plantation Services and Anuradha is a former provincial councillor and had been the acting Diyawadana Nilame on several occasions. Neranjan Wijeyeratne was educated at Royal College, Colombo.

== Diyawadana Nilame ==
Following his father's footsteps, he was elected Diyawadana Nilame (chief lay custodian) of the Sri Dalada Maligawa, Kandy in March 1985 and served for a total of 20 years, until 2005, being re-elected once again in May 1995. Prior to being named the Diyawadana Nilame he served a term of five years as Basnayake Nilame (lay custodian) of Lankathilaka Maha Vishnu devalaya, Kandy. He was noted for his ability when the temple was restored following the LTTE bombing in 1998. He was also responsible for the construction of the famous 'golden fence' around Sri Dalada maligawa. He set up the Dalada Museum, which houses a historic collection of artifacts related to the Temple of the Tooth and Buddhism in Sri Lanka. The 'Temple of the Tooth Special Development Fund and Sri Dalada Maligawa Buddhist Welfare Fund was set up by him. Meanwhile, the Pallekale Sri Lanka International Buddhist Academy (Thai Sri Lanka International Buddhist Institution) with a modern conference hall that can accommodate up to 1000 guests was established by Neranjan Wijeyeratne while he was Diyawadana Nilame. During his tenure, he maintained close links with Japanese, Chinese, Thai and Myanmar religious dignitaries and played a major role in promoting Sri Lanka's Buddhist heritage.

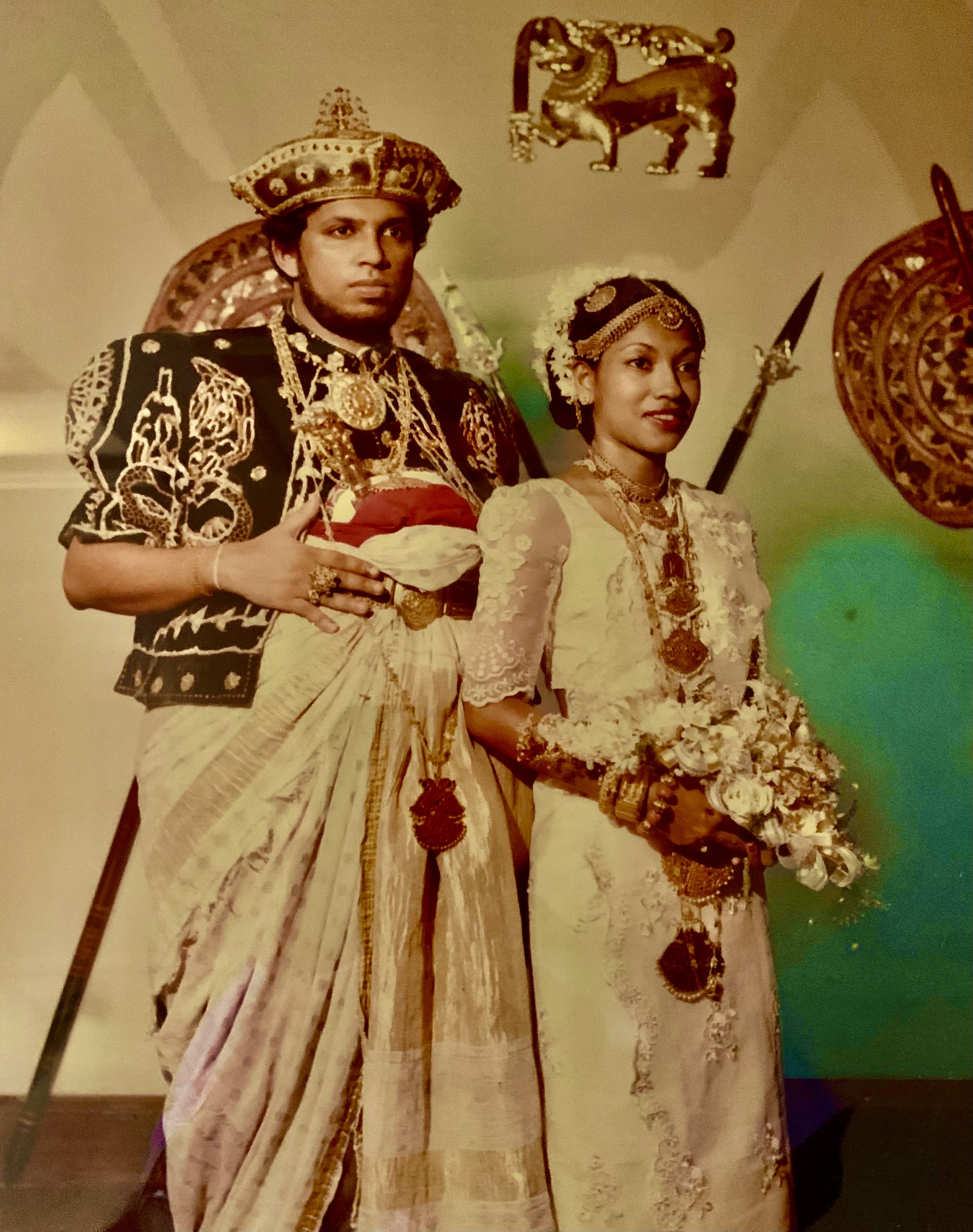
Wedding photo

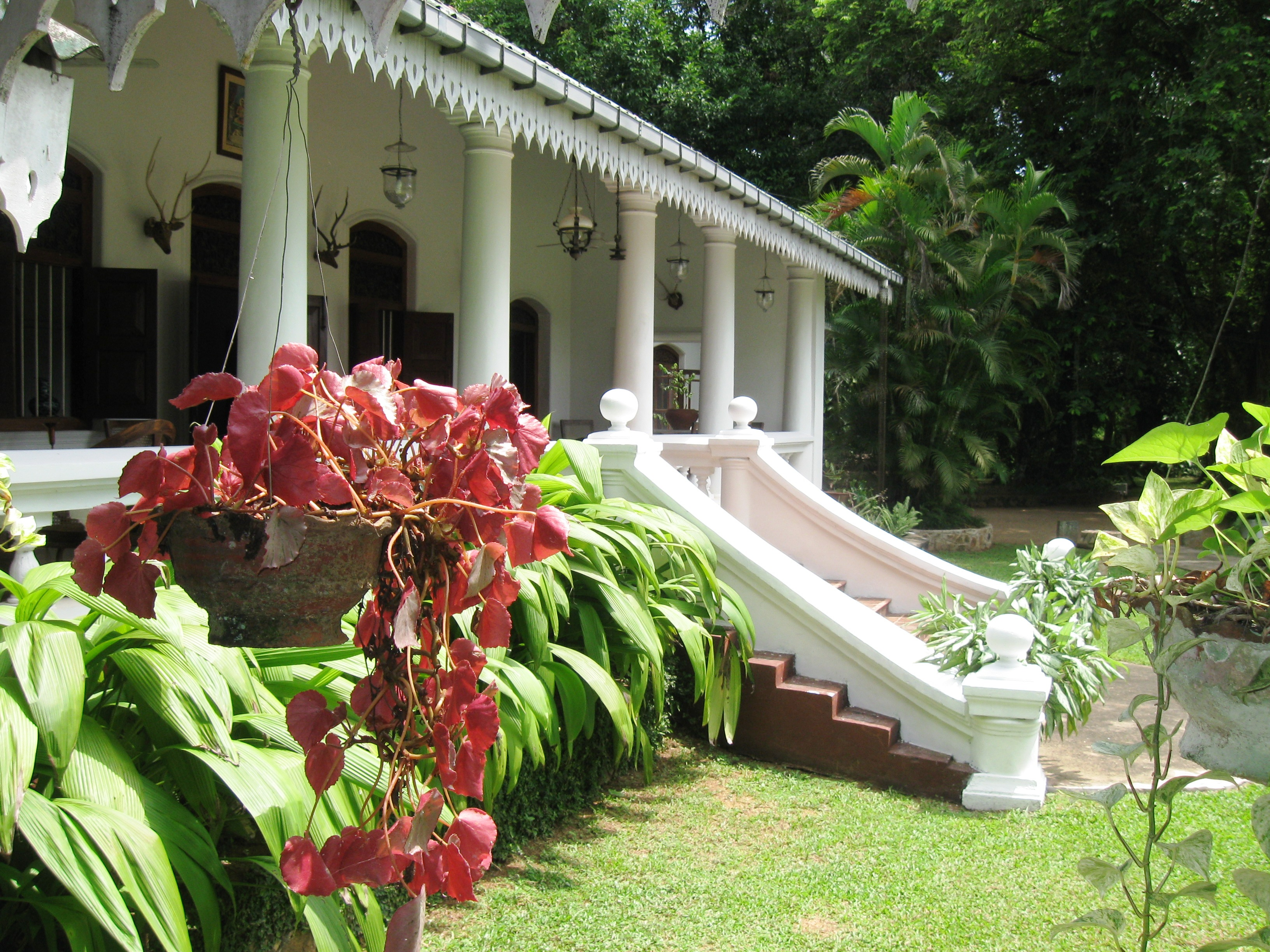
Residence of Neranjan Wijeyeratne Meeduma Walauwa, Rambukkana, Sri Lanka

== Politics ==
After stepping down as Diyawadana Nilame following his second term, he went into active politics.

== Family ==
He is married to Devika Mediwake, daughter of Dr Laxminath and Chintha Mediwake, and granddaughter of William Gopallawa (first president of Sri Lanka) and has two children, a daughter Mokshana Nerandika Wijeyeratne (Senior environmental specialist) The World Bank, Headquarters at Washington, D.C. United States of America. and a son, Navindra Wijeyeratne (BS, MS and PhD) from University of Central Florida, Florida, United States of America, who is an assistant professor at Florida Polytechnic University, Florida, US.

== See also ==
- Diyawadana Nilame, Sri Dalada Maligawa, Kandy
- List of political families in Sri Lanka
