= Pradeep Nilanga Dela =

Chief lay custodian of Sri Dalada Maligawa (2005–present)

- ප්‍රදීප් නිලංග දෑල
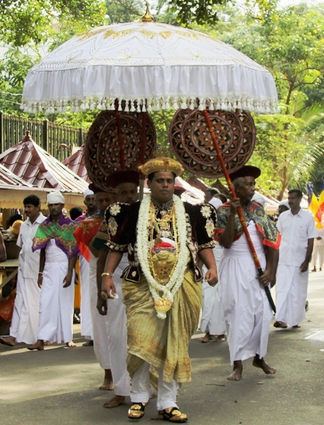

19th Diyawadana Nilame of the Temple of the Sacred Tooth Relic
- Incumbent
- Assumed office 1 July 2005
- Acting: 7 September – 7 November 2025
- Preceded by: Neranjan Wijeyeratne

Personal details
- Born: 28 October 1973 (age 52) Rathnapura, Sri Lanka
- Spouse: Wasana Madhawee Galahitiyawa
- Education: Nalanda College Colombo

Wanigasekara Wanasinghe Mudiyanse Ralahamilage Pradeep Nilanga Dela (Sinhala: වනිගසේකර වනසිංහ මුදියන්සේ රාළහාමිලාගේ ප්‍රදීප් නිලංග දෑල; born 28 October 1973) is the 19th Diyawadana Nilame (chief lay custodian) of Sri Dalada Maligawa.

He served as the Basnayake Nilame of Kataragama devalaya, Kataragama and Maha Saman Devalaya, Ratnapura. He was elected Diyawadana Nilame on 1 July 2005 and served until 7 September 2025, when his term expired. On the same date, he was appointed acting Diyawadana Nilame for a period of three months, pending the election of a new officeholder.

On 7 November 2025, Dela was elected to his third ten-year term till 2035.

== Personal life ==
Nilanga was educated at Nalanda College, Colombo and was presented with Nalanda Keerthi Sri award in 2005 by his alma mater Nalanda College, Colombo.

Nilanga is the son of Dickson Sarathchandra Dela who was the Sri Lankan former High commissioner to Maldives and former Governor of Sabaragamuwa & Northern Province.

== See also ==
- Diyawadana Nilame, Sri Dalada Maligawa, Kandy
