= Mapalagama Wipulasara Maha Thera =

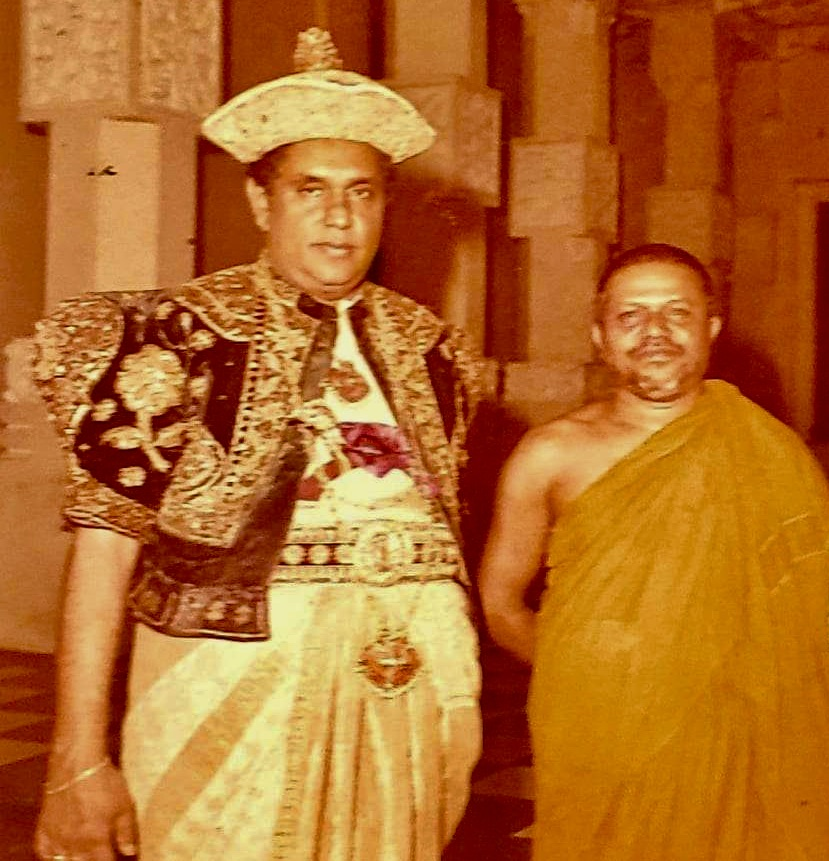
- Dr. Nissanka Wijeyeratne & Designer national emblem of Sri Lanka Venerable Mapalagama Wipulasara Maha Thera
- Title: Chief monk of the Parama Dhamma Chethiya Pirivena

Personal life
- Born: 3 March 1925
- Died: 28 October 2000 (aged 75)
- Notable work: Designer of the national emblem of Sri Lanka

Religious life
- Religion: Theravada Buddhism

Senior posting
- Based in: Ratmalana, Sri Lanka

Venerable Mapalagama Wipulasara Maha Thera (3 March 1925 – 28 October 2000) was a Theravada Buddhist monk in Sri Lanka. He was also an artist and sculptor who has gained fame through his sculptures of Buddha statues that are worshiped in many places within Sri Lanka and abroad. He has held Exhibitions in Soviet Russia and China in the years 1961 and 1963 respectively.

Emblem of Sri Lanka

== National Emblem ==
Ven Mapalagama Wipulasara Maha Thera was the designer of the national emblem of Sri Lanka in 1972 under the direction of Dr Nissanka Wijeyeratne who was the Chairman of the emblem of Sri Lanka and Flag Design Committee at the time and Art Work by S.M Seneviratne.

== Paarama Dhamma Chethiya Pirivena ==
The Maha Thera was the chief monk of the Parama Dhamma Chethiya Pirivena in Ratmalana. This is an international Buddhist institute where novices and monks from Sri Lanka and other countries come and learn Buddhism, Sinhala, Pali, Sanskrit and English.

== Honours ==
Ven Mapalagama Wipulasara Thera has gained many awards and titles from various countries for his services to the Buddhist community. In 1984 he was awarded the "Kalasoori Merit Award" by the Government of Sri Lanka.
