= Diyawadana Nilame =

Office of chief lay custodian in Sri Lanka

Diyawadana Nilame of the Temple of the Sacred Tooth Relic ශ්‍රී දළදා මාලිගාවේ දියවඩන නිලමේ
- The Buddhist Flag

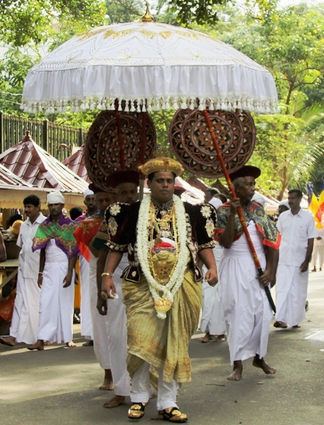
- Incumbent; Pradeep Nilanga Dela since 1 July 2005
- Style: The Honourable
- Nominator: Mahanayaka Theros of Malwathu Viharaya and Asgiri Viharaya; Viharadhipati Theros of all temples of Malwathu Viharaya and Asgiri Viharaya; District Secretaries holding office within the Kandyan provinces Basnayaka Nilames of all Devales situated within the Kandyan provinces
- Appointer: Commissioner General of Buddhist Affairs
- Term length: Ten years
- Inaugural holder: Kapuwaththe Adhikaram
- Formation: 2 March 1815; 211 years ago

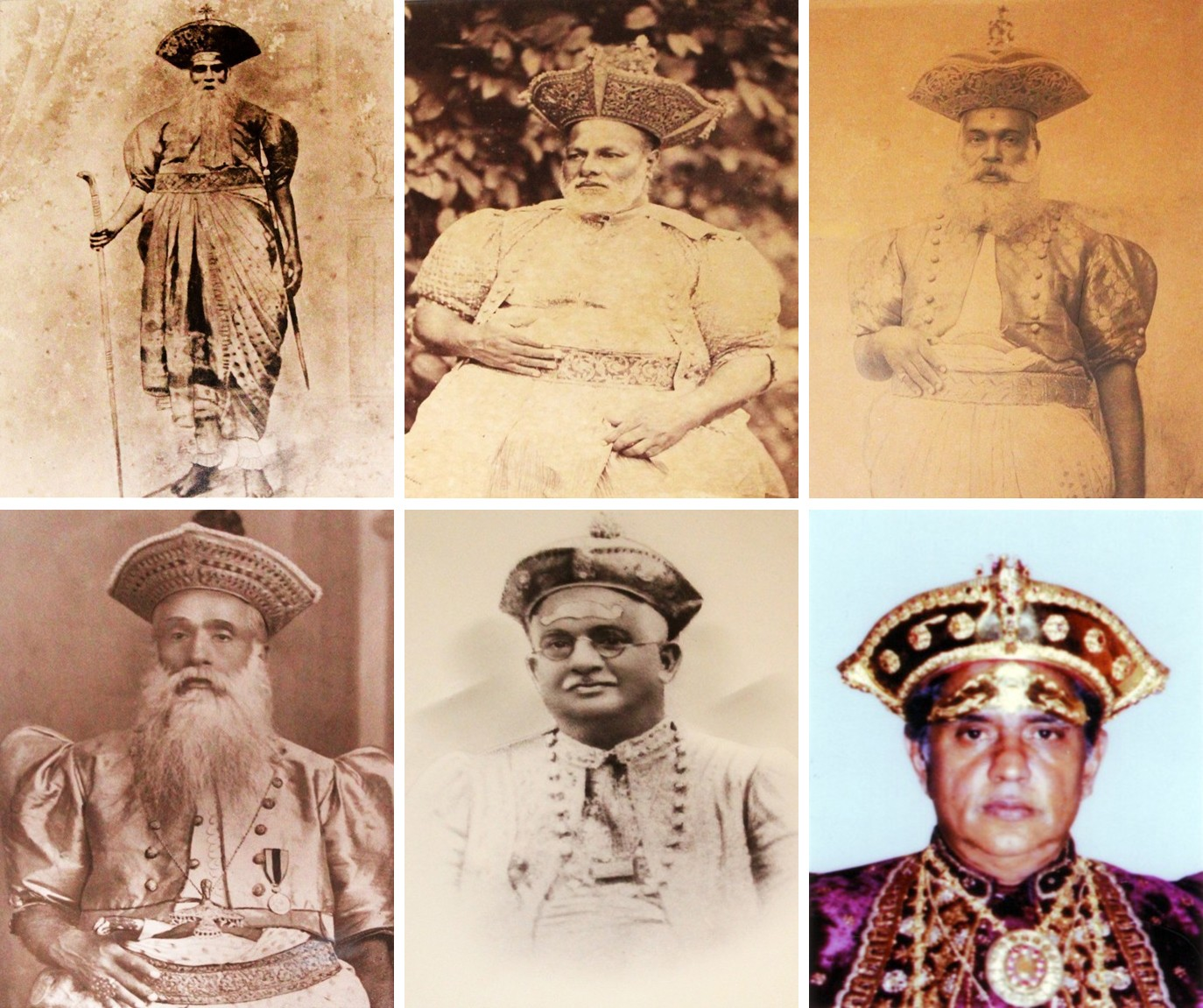
Notable Diyawadana Nilames of the past.

Diyawadana Nilame is the office of the chief lay custodian of the Temple of the Tooth, Kandy, Sri Lanka. Formerly an office of the royal household, at present it is the trustee for the Temple of the Tooth as defined by the Buddhist Temporalities Ordinance of 1931. A ceremonial position, it is enriched with over 2,000 years of history to protect and carry out ancient rituals for the relic of the tooth of the Buddha. The Diyawadana Nilame recognised as a states man has the responsibility of overseeing all aspects of the Sri Dalada Maligawa. He has the traditional duty of organising the annual pageant, the Kandy Esala Perahera. The current Diyawadana Nilame is Pradeep Nilanga Dela.

Prior to 1815, during the Kingdom of Kandy, the Diyawadana Nilame was a courtier of the royal court tasked with supplying the King with water and carrying out the ancient rituals to ensure rain during correct seasons. This duty is still carried out by the Diyawadana Nilame for the most relic of the tooth of the Buddha, marked by the water cutting ceremony on the final day of the Esala Perahera.

== Appointment ==
The appointment of the Diyawadana Nilame is carried out under the provisions of the Buddhist Temporalities Ordinance of 1931 by the Commissioner General of Buddhist Affairs. On the vacancy occurs in the office of the Diyawadana Nilame, the Commissioner-General of Buddhist Affairs within three months will summon to a meeting in Kandy to appoint the new Diyawadana Nilame. Summoned to the meeting are;

- Mahanayaka Theras (Chief Priest) of Malwathu Maha Viharaya and Asgiri Maha Viharaya

Viharadhipati Theros of all temples of Malwathu Viharaya and Asgiri Viharaya

- District Secretaries holding office within the Kandyan provinces
- Basnayaka Nilames of all Devales situated within the Kandyan provinces
- Trustees of all temples within the Kandyan provinces of which the annual income during the three preceding years is estimated by the Commissioner-General of Buddhist Affairs at over one thousand rupees;

The Commissioner General of Buddhist Affairs will preside at this meeting. If only one name is proposed and seconded for election, the Commissioner-General will declare such person appointed to the office of Diyawadana Nilame. If more than one name is proposed and seconded for election a secret ballot will be held and the Commissioner-General of Buddhist Affairs will declare the person who receives the highest number of votes at the ballot appointed to the office of Diyawadana Nilame. This will be followed by a written declaration of the appointment by the Commissioner-General within one month.

== History ==
The Diyawadana Nilame is now elected by a far-flung electorate comprising the venerable Mahanayake Theras of the Malwatte and Asgiriya Chapters. Trustees of Buddhist Temples with an annual income of Rs. 1,000/- and registered with the Public Trustee and the divisional revenue officers (now Sri Lanka Administrative Service Officers) in the Kandy areas. These officers have to be Buddhists and male. Lady Administrative Service officers are not eligible to vote. Each term of an elected Diyawadana Nilame is 10 years and he may run for a second term.

It was a Board of Commissioners that had administered the Kandyan Province until AD 1832. Colebrook and Cameron, who recommended the unification of the administration of the country, wrote:

The possession and exhibition of the Relic of the Buddhoo is regarded by the natives of the Kandyan Provinces as the most important of the prerogative of the King of Kandy (new) under the charge of the Board of Commissioners. When it is exposed to the view, the people of all classes are expected to repair from the remotest Provinces to the capital... the relic was exhibited in 1828 AD in the presence of the Governor and other authorities. This ceremony, which was conducted with great pomp.... the selection and appointment of Chiefs and Priests of Temples, was a prerogative of the Kings of Kandy, which is still exercised by the government, although in the nomination to the priesthood the recommendations from the Vihares (College) are usually attended.

The matters relating to the Dalada, Asgiriya, Malwatte, Devalaya, Nilames etc., were discussed at length in the British Cabinet in 1853 AD. The Duke of Newcastle, the Secretary of State for the Colonies wrote to Sir George Anderson, the Governor of Ceylon on 18 August 1853, as follows regarding the future custodian of Dalada and the election of the Diyawadana Nilame:

I have likewise to approve of what you have done as regards the Dalada or the Sacred Tooth Relic, which I am glad to find again relinquished, as in 1847, to three of the principal Buddhists. I have no doubt you have exercised a sound discretion in making no specific condition with respect to the exhibition of this relic, and contenting yourself with a general caution to the persons placed in charge of it.

The arrangements adopted by you, with respect to the Basnayaka Nilames and Dewa Nilame (Diyawadana Nilame) the secular superintendents herefore appointed by the government had been to create constituencies for the purpose of electing these functionaries (nothing of that sort having as yet existed) out of the Basnayaka Nilames and principal native headmen of the respective districts, the ‘Dew Nilame’ (Diyawadana Nilame) being also made on election for the Basnayaka Nilame in certain cases, and then to provide the persons chosen by these constituencies with a government certificate of recognition similar to that of the protection of the chief priests.

And it appears that both a Dewa Nilme (Diyawadana Nilame) and a Basnayaka Nilame have been already elected upon this new system. The election machinery thus introduced is certainly open to some objections but no arrangement appears to have been suggested, nor does any occur to me, which would not have involved other objections at least as great.

Temple of the Tooth had been managed for the longest period by the Nugawela family, who have served the post of Diyawadana Nilame of the Temple of the Tooth for six decades from 1901 to 1961. C. B. Nugawela of Eladatta Walauwa, father of the first Adigar, the late Sir Lawrenece Nugawela, is credited for doing a considerable amount of work for the Temple of the Tooth: '...during his period of office he built the front portion of the Dalada Maligawa and also a temple for the priests performing "Thevava" to the Sacred Tooth Relic.' Similarly, P.B Nugawela, the father of a former Minister of Education, the late Major E. A. Nugawela, contributed immensely to the development of the Temple of the Tooth: "He was responsible for introducing ves dancers to the perahera. He also built a three-story extension to the Maligawa with the help of a Burmese priest..."

=== Election ===
The election to select the next Diyawadana Nilame was held on 7 November 2025 in Kandy, with seven candidates contesting. A total of 267 individuals were eligible to vote in the election, including 157 Buddhist clergy and lay custodians of royal temples within the former Kingdom of Kandy, 71 divisional secretaries and 29 of the 31 eligible chief custodians of devalayas gazetted under the Temple and Devalagam Ordinance. Pradeep Nilanga Dela was elected for his third ten-year term, which will run until 2035.

== List of Diyawadana Nilames ==
List of Diyawada Nilames since 1814
No.	Diyawadana Nilame	From	To	Ref.
1	Kapuwatte Adikaram	1814	1824	
2	Dehigama Loku Banda	1824	1827	
3	Kuda Molligoda	1827	1828	
4	Kuda Dehigama	1828	1835	
5	Mullegama Adikaram	1835	1842	
6	Dullewe Adikaram	1842	1848	
7	Loku Banda Dehigama	1848	1862	
8	Kuda Banda Dunuvila	1862	1882	
9	Kudamudiyanse Giragama	1882	1897	
10	Seneviratna Ratwatte	1897	1901	
11	Kuda Bandara Nugawela	1901	1916	
12	Punchi Banda Nugawela	1916	1937	
13	Tikiri Banda Nugawela	1937	1947	
14	Kuda Banda Nugawela	1947	1961	
15	Harris Leuke Ratwatte	1961	1964	
16	Heen Banda Udurawana	1964	1975	
17	Nissanka Wijeyeratne	1975	1985	
18	Neranjan Wijeyeratne	1985	2005	
19	Pradeep Nilanga Dela	1 July 2005	Incumbent	

== Acting Diyawadana Nilames since 1814 ==
Acting Diyawadana Nilames appointed by the Commissioner General of Buddhist Affairs with recommendation from Mahanayaka Theras of the Malwatte & Asgiriya Chapters.

- General Anuruddha Ratwatte
- Anuradha Dullewe Wijeyeratne
- Rohan Salinda Paranagama (2005)
- Pradeep Nilanga Dela (7 September – 7 November 2025)

== See also ==
- Dāṭhavaṃsa

== Notes ==
Sources
