= Hean Sahib =

Hean Sahib Economist

Secretary of State, Ministry of Economy and Finance

Chairman, Cambodia Securities Exchange

Personal details
- Born: Kampot, Cambodia
- Education: Kyiv State University, Ukraine (MA, PhD)
- Website: Ministry of Economy and Finance

Hean Sahib (Khmer: ហ៊ាន សាហ៊ីប) is a Cambodian economist, educator, and public official who currently serves as Secretary of State of the Ministry of Economy and Finance (MEF) and Permanent Vice Chairman of the Supreme National Economic Council (SNEC) of the Royal Government of Cambodia.

== Career ==
In his early career, Hean Sahib was the inaugural Director of the Economics and Finance Institute (EFI) of the Ministry of Economy and Finance (MEF), which was established in 1997. Through capacity building, EFI had contributed towards a smooth transition of Cambodian economic system from planned economy to market economy, and had trained public servants in the fields of economics and public finance to be ready for Cambodia's integration into ASEAN in 1999. Since then, he has been holding the leading role for Cambodia's human capital development in the fields of economics and public finance by serving as Chairman of the EFI's board of directors and Chairman of the MEF's Working Group on Capacity Building for the Government Officials.

In these roles, he has paved the way for MEF's human resource development system and strategies. Under his leadership, EFI has attracted technical and financial supports from key development partners, such as EU, World Bank, IMF, UNDP, ADB, JICA, SIDA, and Temasek Foundation International. EFI has also established close cooperation and collaboration with international training and research institutes, including Charles Sturt University of Australia, Korea Development Institute of South Korea, Nanyang Technological University of Singapore, Asia-Pacific Finance and Development Institute of China, and Civil Service College of Singapore.

Besides, Sahib has been leading a nationwide project called “Financial Management Information System - FMIS”, which has helped to improve efficiency, accountability, transparency, and good governance over the usage of the national budget. This, in turn, ensures sustainable growth and poverty reduction, and supports the Public Financial Management Reform Program of the Royal Government of Cambodia.

Sahib is also Chairman of the Private Investment Project Review Team with the primary goal of managing public finance and state property while ensuring an optimal balance among assisting and also providing incentives, promoting economic growth and efficiently collecting revenues. In 2024, he was reappointed as Advisor to the Prime Minister to lead the Preah Sihanouk Province Investment Promotion Working Group since 2024, and the Northeastern Region Investment Promotion Working Group since 2025. Moreover, he has held a number of strategic roles in socio-economic development policy including Vice Chairman and Secretary General of the Supreme National Economic Council (SNEC) along with many others. He is currently Permanent Vice Chairman of the SNEC with Senior Minister rank. He is also Chairman of the Cambodia Securities Exchange (CSX), Member of the Board of Directors of the Royal School of Administration (ERA), and Member of the Board of Directors of the Royal Academy of Cambodia (RAC).

== Education ==
Hean Sahib received his Master's degree and Ph.D. in economics from the Kyiv State University, Ukraine (now Taras Shevchenko National University of Kyiv) in 1991 and 1994, respectively. His research interests are on economic policy, public finance, and private sector development strategy. He has authored books and papers, covering public economics and the roles of government in the economy. He is Professor of Economics at public higher education institutions in Cambodia, including the Royal School of Administration, the Royal Academy of Cambodia, and the Economics and Finance Institute, where he has trained and mentored numerous Cambodian students, researchers, entrepreneurs, young leaders, and governmental officials. Because of these outstanding contributions, he had the honours to receive the full membership of the Royal Academy of Cambodia and is entitled as “Paṇḍit Sabhācār” (Academician) by the King of the Kingdom of Cambodia in 2018.

== Research and Publications ==
Throughout his professional career, Hean Sahib is an active researcher, professor, and author. He has published works related to the fields of development economics, public finance, governance, the relationship between the state and the market economy, and economic thoughts. His notable works include books such as Managing Economy and Finance, and Economists’ Thoughts and Economics, as well as numerous other educational materials on the state and the market economy. He highlights the importance of effective institutions, a long-term strategic vision, human capital development, and good governance in achieving sustainable national development. He emphasizes the role of a strong and robust state in guiding national socio-economic development, meaning that the state must possess a national development perspective and a long-term vision, maintain a strong culture and system of leadership, and adopt an effective justice and governance system; ultimately, it should be built on the principles of meritocracy and checks and balances, where human resources are central and public officials are rewarded based primarily on competence. Public institutions must adopt a comprehensive leadership system, exercise authority within their respective jurisdictions, and execute their duties with synergy (integrating their efforts in an interconnected and synchronized manner) within the framework of “Dynamics of Stakeholders’ System,” which maintains coherence, close cooperation, mutual complementation, high responsibility for implementing national development policies, and responds to social needs in a timely manner, driven by a well-coordinated public administration process that possesses a clear vision and relies on the rule of law as its backbone. This will foster trust in national development policies, which serves as a precondition and a catalyst for the effective participation of citizens, businesses, and all relevant stakeholders.

He adopts the mixed economic system known as “The Third Path” as his economic philosophy, and maintains that while a market economy is efficient, it creates social inequality; conversely, a planned economy promotes equality but lacks justice and suffers from limited efficiency. To achieve both efficiency, equity and social justice, the development framework must incorporate the concept of “the state and the market economy playing central, complementary roles,” which is the mixed system. The effectiveness of a mixed economic system rests on a dialectical approach that balances market mechanisms and state intervention. In the Cambodian context, the state must be active and proactive in implementing national socio-economic development policies based on a dialectical approach, meaning it must select policy measures that are optimized for the national socio-economic development. He emphasizes that to successfully implement the aforementioned perspective, all parties (the state and the market economy) must operate in synergy that is integrating their efforts under the framework of “Dynamics of Stakeholders’ System,” and all parties must act in concert, guided by the spirit of the “idealism” of the interests of the nation and its people.
