= Wattegama =

Wattegama වත්තේගම வத்தேகம
- Location in Sri Lanka
- Coordinates: 7°21′01″N 80°40′57″E
- Country: Sri Lanka
- Province: Central Province
- District: Kandy District

Government
  - Type: Urban Council
- Elevation: 485 m (1,591 ft)

Population
  - Total: 8,157
- Time zone: +5.30

Wattegama (Sinhala: වත්තේගම, Tamil:வத்தேகம) is a town and Urban Council in Kandy District in the Central Province of Sri Lanka.

== See also ==
- Peradeniya
- Katugastota
