= Coordinating secretary =

Sinhalese political office

A Coordinating Secretary in the Government of Sri Lanka is a senior member of the personal staff of the President, the Prime Minister, a Cabinet Minister or a Secretary of a Ministry. The appointment is within the power of the minister and may or may not be a civil servant, therefore are considered to be political appointees.

A Coordinating Secretary is normally of middle management level however, as the key official responsible for disseminating the decision of Ministers and indeed as their gatekeeper, their role is of considerably greater significance than the grade or level they hold suggests. They will be assisted by one or more Assistants, or even head a whole office in which those may be section clerks. Other members of personal staff would include Private Secretary, Public Relations Officer and Media Secretary. Pay for these officers are allocated from the relevant ministry.

Coordinating secretaries are the principal link between a government Minister and officials in the Ministry. The Coordinating Secretary has overall responsibility for coordinating the development of the Minister's policy remit, ensuring that the aims of Ministers are clearly and fully implemented by the Department. In that respect a CS will often be in a position of debate with colleagues of much higher seniority.

A similar role to a Coordinating Secretary in the United States Administration would be a 'Chief of Staff' and its British counterpart would be a Private Secretary.

== See also ==
- Private Secretary
- Special adviser (UK)
