= Dedigama =

Dedigama is an electorate once represented by Dudley Senanayake (former Prime Minister) in Kegalle District, Sri Lanka.
