= Bandaranaike family =

Political family in Sri Lanka

The Bandaranaike family
- Current region: Colombo
- Origin: Atthanagalla
- Members: Solomon Dias Bandaranaike; S. W. R. D. Bandaranaike; Sirimavo Bandaranaike; Chandrika Bandaranaike; Anura Bandaranaike; Sunethra Bandaranaike
- Connected members: Vijaya Kumaranatunga; Jeewan Kumaranatunga; Ranjan Ramanayake
- Traditions: Shaivism; Catholic Church; Dutch Reformed Church; Anglicanism; Theravada Buddhism
- Estate: Neela Perumal (Kalu Kapuge – the black priest) Horagolla Walauwa

The Bandaranaike family is a Sinhalese family prominent in Sri Lankan politics. The family includes three prime ministers, one President of Sri Lanka and one Speaker of the Parliament.

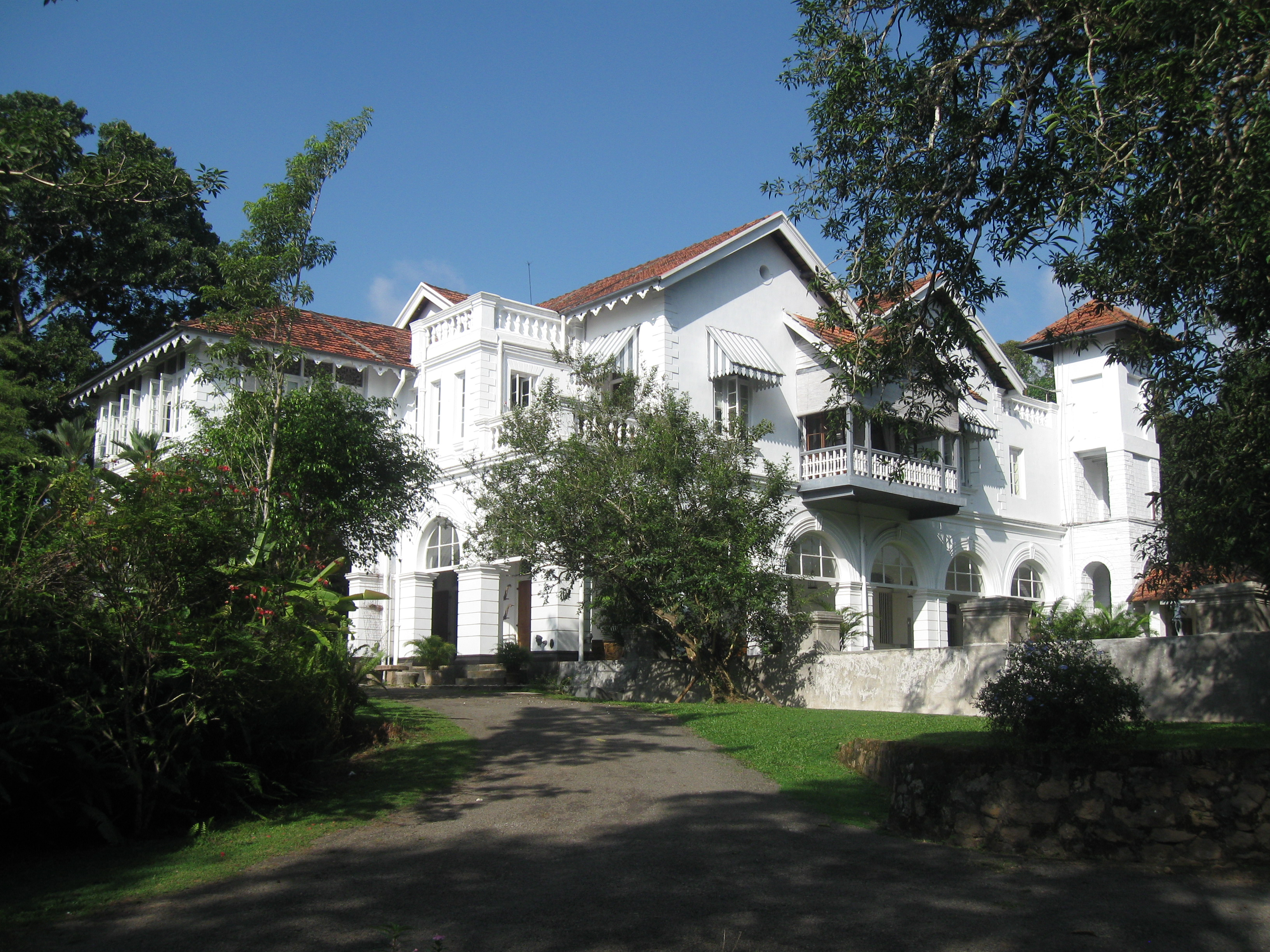
Horagolla Walauwa, Atthanagalla—family seat of the Bandaranaike family

== History ==
The Bandaranayaka family is claimed to originate from Nilaperumal Pandaram, who was from Tamilnadu, India and served as high priest of the Temple of Nawagamuwa Pattini Devalaya. "Nayaka pandaran" is said to be the original name which the family changed to the Sinhalese form of Bandaranaike and adopted Portuguese names like Dias. They served the Portuguese and, later, Dutch colonial rulers. Their golden era began as translators and local scribes, expanding their influence and power serving as local headmen. A member of the family, Don William Dias, who served as a translator for the British, was present when deposed the Kandyan King Sri Vikrama Rajasinha of Kandy was captured while in hiding by Ekneligoda Disawa.

== Family tree ==
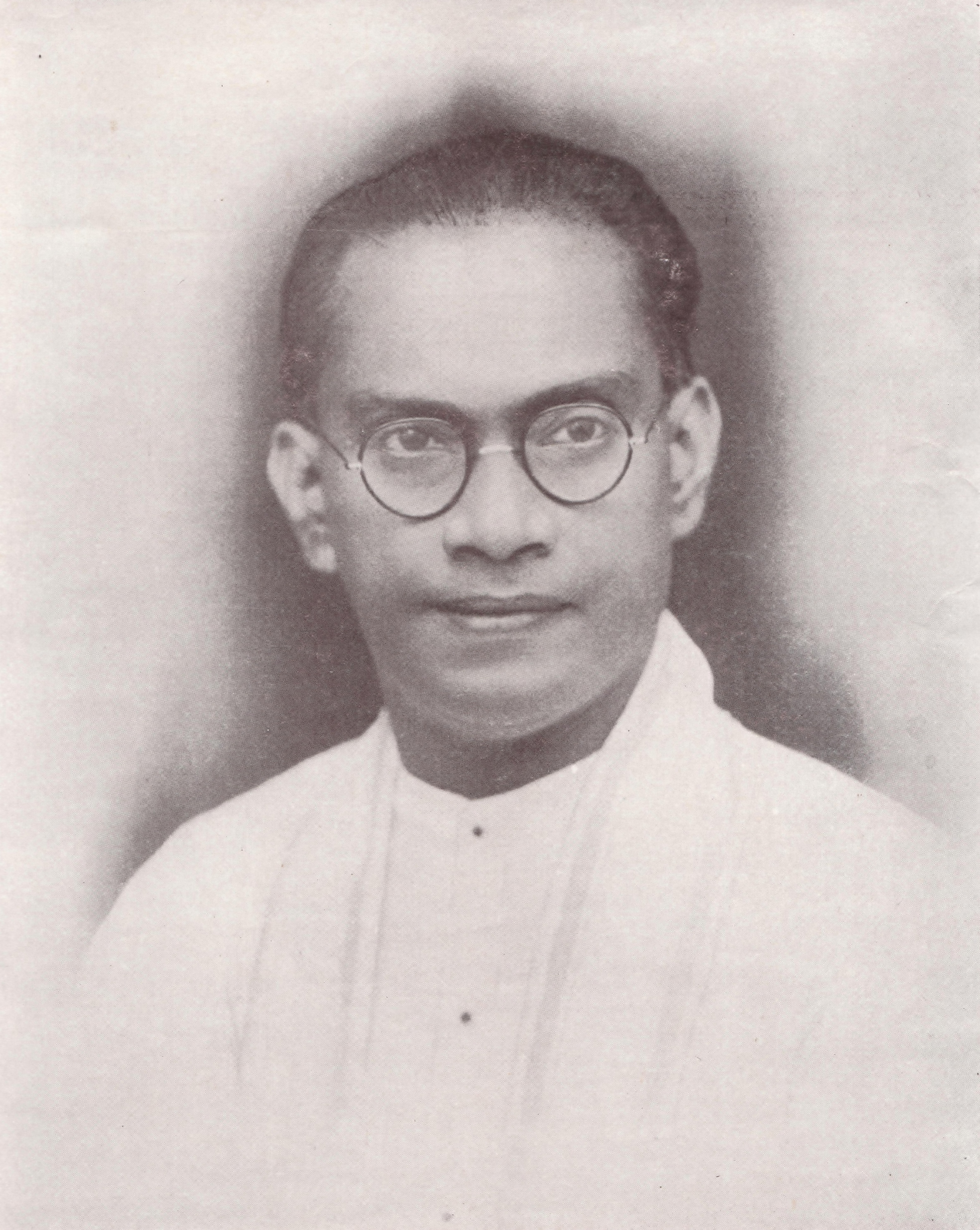
S. W. R. D. Bandaranaike, Prime Minister of Ceylon

- Don Francisco Dias Wijetunga Bandaranaike (born 1720), Mudaliyar Hewagam Korale + Dona MarKumarathunga
  - Conrad Pieter Dias Wijewardena Bandaranaike, Maha Mudliyar
    - Jacabus Dias Wijewardena Bandaranaike (born 1780), Mudaliyar of Governor Gate & Translator of Supreme Court + Liyanage Catherine Philipsz Panditharatne
      - John Charles Dias Bandaranaike, Member of Legislative Council of Ceylon
      - Sir Harry Dias Bandaranaike, Puisne Justice of the Supreme Court of Sri Lanka and Member of Legislative Council
      - Rev Canon Samuel William Dias Bandaranaike + Cornelia Susanna Elizabeth Dias Bandaranaike
        - James Peter Obeyesekere I (stepson of Cornelia's first marriage to D. B. Ferdinandus Obeysekere), Member of Legislative Council + Corneliya Henrietta Dias Bandaranaike (daughter of Don Christoffel Henricus Dias Bandaranaike)
          - Sir James Peter Obeyesekere II, Head Mudaliyar
            - Deshamanya James Peter Obeyesekere III, Parliamentary Secretary to the Minister of Health and Finance, Senator and Member of Parliament for Attanagalla + Deshamanya Siva Obeyesekere, Cabinet Minister of Health and Member of Parliament for Mirigama
          - Donald Obeyesekere, Member of the Legislative Council and the State Council of Ceylon.
        - Sir Solomon Christoffel Obeyesekere (stepson of Cornelia's first marriage to D. B. Ferdinandus Obeysekere), Member of Legislative Council
          - Sir Forester Augustus Obeysekera, Member of the Legislative Council and Speaker of the State Council.
          - Daisy Ezline Obeysekera + Sir Solomon Dias Bandaranaike
          - Liliyan Augusta Obeysekera + Gate Mudaliyar Simon William Ilangakoon
            - Christophel Panini Illangakoon, Member of Parliament for Weligama
        - Felix Reginold Dias Bandaranaike (1861–1947) + Annie Lucy (Florence) de Alwis (1864–1920)
          - Reginald Felix Dias Bandaranaike (1891–1951), Judge of the Supreme Court + Freda Dias Abeysinghe
            - Felix Dias Bandaranaike (1930–1985), Government Minister, Member of Parliament
  - Don Daniel Dias Bandaranaike + Dona Clara Amarasekere
    - Don Solomon Dias Bandaranaike (-1859), Mudaliyar of Siyane Korale, 1st Udagaha Mudaliyar + Cornelia Philipsz Panditharatne de Saram
      - Don Christoffel Henricus Dias Abeywickrema Jayatilake Seneviratne Bandaranaike (born 1826), Mudaliyar Governors Gate and 2nd Udagaha Mudaliyar + Anna Florentina Philipsz Panditharatne
        - Sir Solomon Dias Bandaranaike (1862–1946), Maha Mudaliyar + Daisy Ezline Obeyesekere
          - S. W. R. D. Bandaranaike (1899–1959), Prime Minister of Ceylon, Government Minister, Member of Parliament, Member of State Council + Sirimavo Bandaranaike (1916–2000), Prime Minister of Ceylon, Member of Parliament, Senator
            - Sunethra Bandaranaike (born c. 1943), politician and socialite
            - Chandrika Bandaranaike (born 1945), President of Sri Lanka, Prime Minister of Sri Lanka, Member of Parliament, Chief Minister of Western Province, Provincial Councillor + Vijaya Kumaratunga (1945–1988), actor and politician
              - Yashodara Sirimavo Kumarathunga Walker
              - Vimukthi Kumaratunga
            - Anura Bandaranaike (1949–2008); Speaker of the Parliament of Sri Lanka, Government Minister, Member of Parliament

Other members of the family include;

- S. D. Bandaranayake
- Pandu Bandaranaike
- James de Alwis
- Albert L. De Alwis Seneviratne

(also related to Ratwatte family, William Gopallawa, A.R. Udugama, Hector Kobbekaduwa, Jeewan Kumaranatunga)

== Legacy ==
=== Horagolla Bandaranaike Samadhi ===
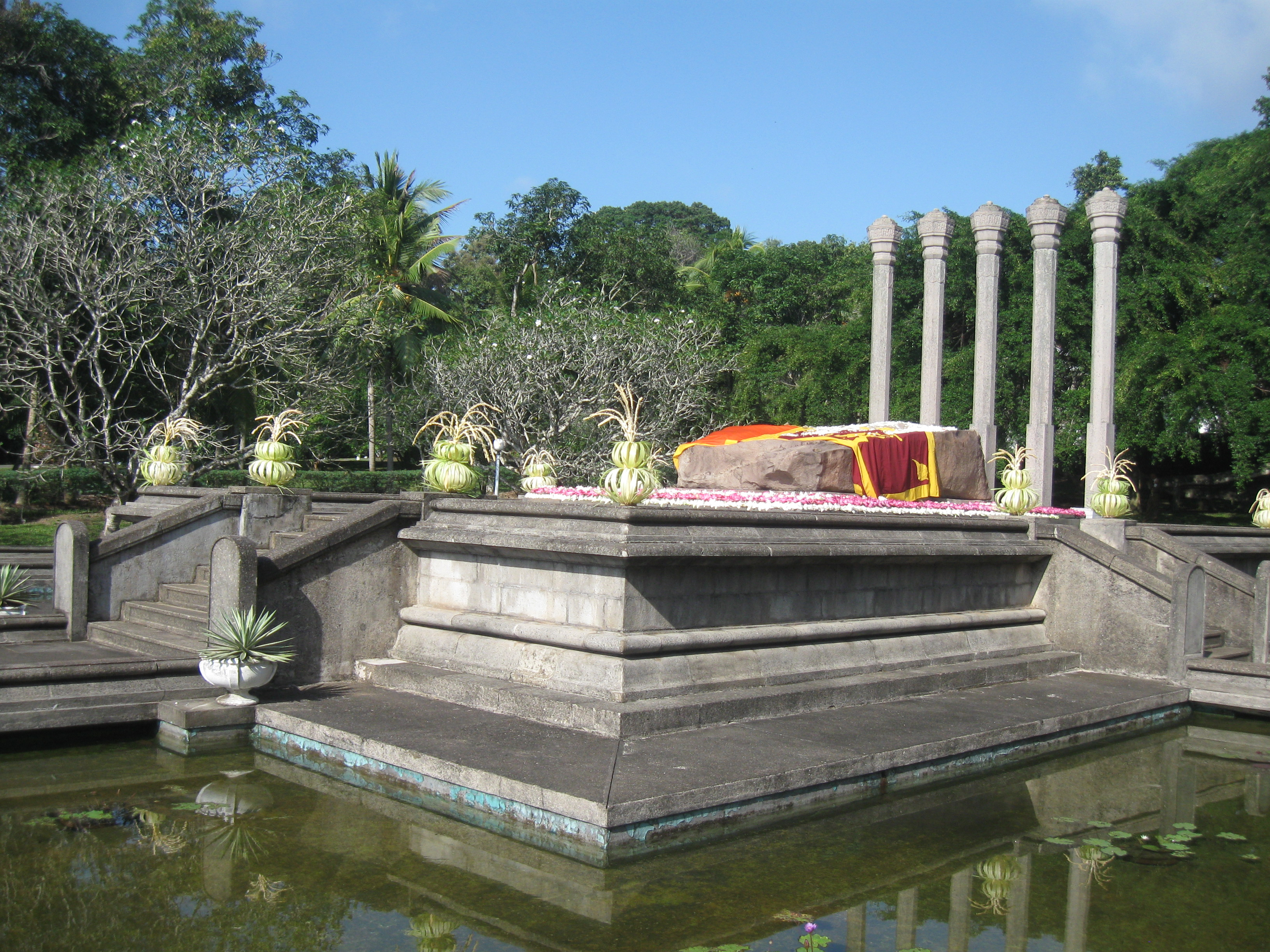
Horagolla Bandaranaike Samadhi.

The Horagolla Bandaranaike Samadhi is the final resting place of Solomon West Ridgeway Dias Bandaranaike and his wife Sirimavo Ratwatte Dias Bandaranaike. It is located in the grounds of the Bandaranaike family seat of Horagolla in Atthanagalla, Western Province, Sri Lanka.

=== Bandaranaike Memorial International Conference Hall ===
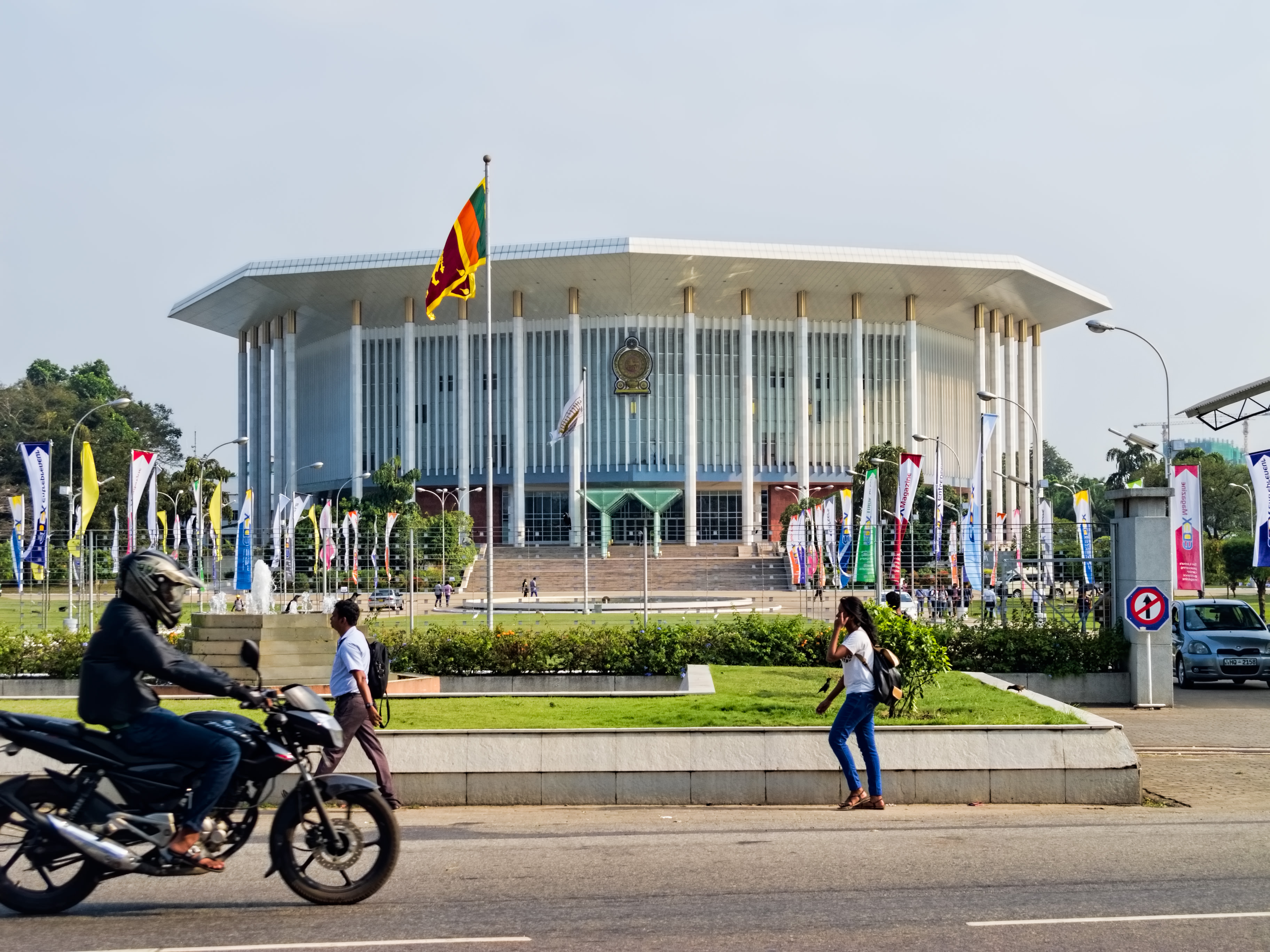
Bandaranaike Memorial International Conference Hall, Colombo.

Constructed as a gift from the People's Republic of China in 1970 in the memory of S. W. R. D. Bandaranaike, the Bandaranaike Memorial International Conference Hall was the largest conference hall on the island and in 2003 Sirimavo Bandaranaike Memorial Exhibition Centre was added to the same complex as a gift from the People's Republic of China in the memory of Sirimavo Bandaranaike. The complex is governed by the S. W. R. D. Bandaranaike National Memorial Foundation which was established by the S. W. R. D. Bandaranaike National Memorial Foundation Act No. 2 of 1975 with a permanent seat for the senior member of the Bandaranaike and two seats for distinguished individuals appointed by that family member on the board.

== See also ==
- List of political families in Sri Lanka
