= Obeyesekere =

Obeyesekere (Sinhala: ඔබේසේකර, romanized: Obēsēkara) is a Sinhalese surname. Notable people with the surname include:

- Arjuna Obeyesekere, Sri Lankan puisne justice of the Supreme Court
- Donald Obeyesekere (1888–1964), colonial era legislator of Ceylon
- Forester Augustus Obeysekera (1880–1961), colonial era legislator of Ceylon
- Gananath Obeyesekere (1930–2025), Sri Lankan anthropologist, Professor of Anthropology at Princeton University
- James Peter Obeyesekere I (????–1880), colonial era legislator of Ceylon
- James Peter Obeyesekere II (1879–1968), Head Mudaliyar
- James Peter Obeyesekere III (1915–2007), Sri Lankan politician
- Solomon Christoffel Obeyesekere (1848–1927), colonial era legislator of Ceylon
