= Felix Bandaranaike =

Felix Bandaranaike may refer to:

- Felix Reginald Dias Bandaranaike I (1861–1947), Ceylonese judge
- Felix Reginald Dias Bandaranaike II (1891–1951), Ceylonese judge
- Felix Dias Bandaranaike (1930–1985), Sri Lankan politician
