= James Obeyesekere =

James Obeyesekere may refer to:

- Sir James Peter Obeyesekere I, Ceylonese lawyer and legislator
- Sir James Peter Obeyesekere II (1879–1968), Head Mudaliyar
- Deshamanya James Peter Obeyesekere III (1915–2007), Sri Lankan politician
