= Solomon Christoffel Obeyesekere =

Ceylonese lawyer and legislator

Sir Solomon Christoffel Obeyesekere (12 February 1848 – 13 October 1927) was Ceylonese lawyer and legislator. He was an unofficial member of the Legislative Council of Ceylon (1900-1916).

== Early life and career ==
Solomon Christoffel Obeyesekere was born 12 February 1848, the youngest son of Don Bastian Ferdinandus Wijesiri Guneratne Obeyesekere, Mudaliyar of Talpe Pattu and Cornelia Susanna Dias née Bandaranaike (daughter of Don Solomon Dias Bandaranaike, Mudliyar of Udugaha). His older brother was James Peter Obeyesekere I. His father died soon after he was born and his mother returned to Colombo. She then married her cousin, Rev. Samuel William Dias Bandaranaike and they had two boys and two girls. The oldest son, Felix Reginald was a Supreme Court judge.

Obeyesekere was educated at Royal Academy and S. Thomas' College, Mutwal. In 1866 he passed the entrance examination for the Calcutta University, obtaining a first class diploma in 1868. He was apprenticed to Charles Ambrose Lorensz and in 1872 he qualified as a proctor, heading the list in every subject.

Engaging in his legal practice, Obeyesekere managed the large family land holdings and was elected President of the Low Country Planters’ Association. In February 1900, Obeysekara was appointed as the Unofficial Member representing the low country Sinhalese in the Legislative Council, replacing Anthonisz De Alwis Seneviratne. He served on the Council until 1916. In 1902 he was among the Ceylonese representatives invited to attend the London Coronation of King Edward VII and Queen Alexandra. He was knighted in 1911 as a Knights Bachelor.

== Family ==
He married Ezline Maria de Alwis, the eldest daughter of James De Alwis, an unofficial member of the Legislative Council. They had four children:

- Daisy Ezline who married Sir Solomon Dias Bandaranaike

- their son, Solomon West Ridgeway Dias Bandaranaike became Prime Minister of Ceylon (1956-1959), followed by his wife, Sirimavo Bandaranaike (1960–1965, 1970–1977 and 1994–2000)

- their daughter (Obeyesekere's great-grand daughter) Chandrika Kumaratunga, became the President of Sri Lanka (1994-2005)
- their son (Obeyesekere's great-grand son) Anura Bandaranaike (1949–2008); became the Speaker of the Parliament of Sri Lanka, a Government Minister and Member of Parliament

- Liliyan Augusta who married Gate Mudaliyar Simon William Ilangakoon

- their son Christophel Panini Illangakoon was the Member of Parliament for Weligama (1965-1960 and 1970-1977)

- Sir Forester Augustus, member of the Legislative Council and Speaker of the State Council (1934-1935)
- Ethel Mildred who married Dr William Christoffel Pieris Siriwardene.

== See also ==
- List of political families in Sri Lanka
- Bandaranaike family
