= Paul Pieris =

Ceylonese civil servant and historian

Sir Paul Edward Pieris Deraniyagala Samarasinha Sriwardhana, CMG (16 February 1874 – 1959; commonly known as Sir Paul E. Pieris) was a Ceylonese civil servant and historian. He served as Ceylon's Trade Commissioner and a District Judge and held multiple appointments as president of the Royal Asiatic Society of Sri Lanka. Although his academic and early career was in the legal field, he is best known for being one of the country's foremost experts on the history of European occupation of Sri Lanka.

== Early life and education ==
Born to John Martinus Pieris Sriwardhana and Don Johannes Dias Bandaranaike, Pieris was educated at S. Thomas' College, Mutwal, and his studies characterised by numerous distinctions; in 1889 he was judged the most successful candidate at the Cambridge Local Junior Examination in the under-sixteen group, and was similarly distinguished in the next two years of study.

Pieris won the University scholarship in 1891 and became the first Asian to be admitted to Trinity College, Cambridge where he gained BA (which was later upgraded to a MA), LLM and Litt.D.(Cantab). He was called to the bar as a barrister of the Inner Temple in 1895. Having passed the Civil Service exam in London, on his return to Ceylon, Pieiris was enrolled as an advocate of the Supreme Court of Ceylon and joined the Ceylon Civil Service in 1896.

== Civil service career ==
In 1896, he was selected to the Ceylon Civil Service and served until his retirement in 1935. Following his cadetship, he served as the office assistant to the Government Agent of the Southern Province. He had served mostly as a District Judge in the towns of Matara, Kegalle, Kandy and Kalutara. During his tenure as District Judge of Kandy, in 1914 he presided over the Gampola Perahera Case filled by a Basnayake Nilame. Pieris's judgement was referred to the Supreme Court of Ceylon by the Attorney General and was set aside eventually leading to the 1915 riots. He served as Trade Commissioner for Ceylon in Britain and thereafter appointed the first Public Trustee of Ceylon, from which he retired in 1935.

== Scholarly work ==
It has been remarked that Pieris was never given a position in the Civil Service that was commensurate with his intellect and ability, and as such he turned his attention toward in depth historical research on the European occupation in Ceylon from the 16th Century onwards. Pieris carried out extensive historical research in Ceylon and he was several times elected the president of the Royal Asiatic Society of Ceylon having last held the role from 1932 to 1934. to whose journal he contributed frequently from 1904 to 1948. He further single-handedly edited the journal during the years of World War II when the society's functions were greatly disrupted by external factors.

=== Notable publications ===
- Notes on some Sinhalese Families in Ceylon (in 6 volumes from 1902 onwards)
- Ceylon: The Portuguese Era (1913), II volumes, 1250 pp.
- Ceylon and the Portuguese, 1505-1658 (assisted by R.B. Naish), 310 pp (1920).
- Ceylon and the Hollanders, 1658-1796 (1918)
- The Kingdom of Jafanapatam, 1645. From the Portuguese Foral. (1920)
- Portuguese Maps and Plans of Ceylon, 1650 (1926)
- The Prince Vijayapala of Ceylon, 1634-1654 (1927), 66 pp.
- The Historic Tragedy of Ceilao, by Captain Joao Ribeiro, tr. 306 pp.
- The Growth of Dutch Influence in Ceylon, 1602-1660, 326 pp.
- The Dutch Power in Ceylon, 1602–1670. Edited by P. E. Pieris. 1929
- Ceylon and Portugal: Kings and Christians, 1539 - 1552. From the archives at Lisbon, P.E. Pieris and M.A.H. Fitzler (1927)
- Portugal in Ceylon: Lectures at King's College, London
- Letters to Ceylon, 1814-1824: Correspondence of Sir John D'Oyly 155pp.
- Tri Sinhala, the Last Phase, 1796–1815 (1945)
- The Ceylon Littoral, 1593 (1949) 88pp.
- Sinhalē and the Patriots, 1815–1818 (1950)

== Honours and awards ==
Pieris received numerous awards during his lifetime. These include;

- The first Asian to receive a Doctor of Letters from the University of Cambridge
- King's Birthday Honours 1933 - Companion of the Order of St Michael and St George (CMG) for service as Public Trustee
- The Royal Asiatic Society Medal for distinguished service in 1946
- Queen's Birthday Honours 1952 - Knight Bachelor for social service.

== Personal life ==
He married Hilda Obeyesekere, daughter of James Peter Obeyesekere I. Lady Hilda Obeyesekere Pieris was an active social worker, who endowed the Hilda Obeysekera Hall, the ladies residency hall at the University of Peradeniya. His brothers-in-law included Donald Obeyesekere and Sir James Peter Obeyesekere II. They had three sons, the zoologist Paules Edward Pieris Deraniyagala; the painter, Justin Pieris Deraniyagala; civil servant Ralph St. Louis Pieris Deraniyagala and one daughter Miriam Pieris Deraniyagala, herself an artist, who married Robert de Saram. Sri Lankan cellist Rohan de Saram is their grandson. Following their retirement from the civil service, Sir Paul Pieris and Lady Obeyesekere Pieris built the Nugedola Wallauwa in Pasyala, Gampaha District, where they spent their retirement.
