= Albert L. De Alwis Seneviratne =

Albert L. De Alwis Seneviratne was a Ceylonese legislator. He was an unofficial member appointed to the Legislative Council of Ceylon representing the Sinhalese from 1881 to 1899, he was succeeded by Solomon Christoffel Obeyesekere.

Born somewhere in 1830 to Johanna Agnetha Gertruda Pieris and David de Alwis Hidella Gunasekera Seneviratne, Mudaliyar Kalutara and Panadura Totamunes and President village Tribunals Raygam Korale. Mudaliyar David de Alwis Seneviratne had been awarded a Gold Medal by Governor Sir Robert Brownrigg for his services during the Great Rebellion of 1817–18. Albert De Alwis Seneviratne had a son, Theodore de Alwis who became a proctor. He was a relative of James De Alwis.

== See also ==
- Bandaranaike family
