= Rajakeeya Mawatha =

Street in Colombo, Sri Lanka

Rajakeeya Mawatha (Sinhalese: රාජකීය මාවත) (English: Royal Avenue formerly Race Course Avenue) is a street in Colombo, Sri Lanka, named after Royal College Colombo, whose grounds border it on the southern side. Located in the prominent residential area of Cinnamon Gardens in Colombo 7, it is home to many notable residents and old mansions.

The street connects Reid Avenue with Thurstan Road and is the Northern border of Royal College, Colombo. It runs east-west line - at its western end is situated the Orient Club, while at the eastern end is the Obeyesekere Walawa.

Two statues at each end of the street commemorate two prominent Sri Lankan politicians, both of whom were assassinated. At the juncture of Rajakeeya Mawatha, Thurstan Road and Flower Road is the statue of Hon. Lalith Athulathmudali an eminent Sri Lankan statesmen and an old Royalist, which was erected by the Government of Sri Lanka following his assassination. At the other end of the street is the statue of Sir Solomon Dias Bandaranike colonial era Maha Mudaliyar and an old Thomian, erected by the Colombo Turf Club facing the old Race Course which was dilapidated for years and has recently been renovated.

Notable residents of Rajakeeya Mawatha include Deshamanya J.P. Obeyesekere III former senator and cabinet minister for health & finance, his wife Dr Siva Obeyesekere, herself a former Health Minister. Notable Businessman Daham Arangallage resides there as well. The Embassy of Qatar is situated here along with the Sri Lanka office of The Asia Foundation.

== Transportation ==
Colombo City Bus 120 services Thurstan Road in both directions from Pettah to Piliyandala and back. Its route intersects Rajakeeya Mawatha at the following point: 6°54′21.4″N 79°51′32.4″E. The closest bus stop near Rajakeeya Mawatha is Thurstan bus stop at 6°54′18.6″N 79°51′30.4″E.
