= Panini Ilangakoon =

Sri Lankan politician (1919–1989)

Member of Parliament for Weligama
- In office 1970–1977
- Preceded by: Montague Jayawickrama
- Succeeded by: Montague Jayawickrama
- In office 1956–1960
- Preceded by: Montague Jayawickrama
- Succeeded by: Montague Jayawickrama

Personal details
- Born: 26 November 1919 Weligama, British Ceylon
- Died: 10 February 1989 (aged 69) Sri Lanka
- Party: Sri Lanka Freedom Party
- Spouse(s): Effie Samarakkody; Lilly Goonasekere
- Relations: S. W. R. D. Bandaranaike (cousin)
- Children: 2
- Education: S. Thomas' College, Mount Lavinia
- Profession: politician

Christophel Panini Illangakoon (Sinhala: ක්‍රිස්ටෝෆෙල් පනිනි ඉල්ලන්ගකූන්) (10 November 1919 – 10 February 1989) was a Sri Lankan politician. He was a member of parliament from Weligama in Matara and a first cousin of S. W. R. D. Bandaranaike, former Prime Minister of Ceylon.

== Early life and education ==
Ilangakoon was born on 26 November 1919 at Weligama to Gate Mudaliyar Simon William Ilangakoon and Liliyan Augusta Obeysekera, daughter of Sir Solomon Christoffel Obeyesekere, a member of the Legislative Council of Ceylon.

He received his primary and secondary education at S. Thomas' College, Mount Lavinia and completed his studies in agriculture in Bangalore and in the United Kingdom.

== Political career ==
Ilangakoon entered politics in 1947 being elected member of the Weligama Urban Council. He became a member of the newly formed Sri Lanka Freedom Party in 1952 and contested the Weligama seat unsuccessfully, losing to Montague Jayawickrama. In 1956, he elected in the general election defeating Jayawickrama. He was defeated by Jayawickrama in 1960, but was able to defeat Jayawickrama and was elected in 1970, to be defeated again in 1977 by Jayawickrama.

== Family ==
Ilangakoon was married twice, firstly to Effie née Samarakkody with whom he had a son, Panini (Jr); then to Lilly née Goonasekere with whom he had Gamini.

His first wife Effie remarried Robert Edward Jayatilaka and was later elected as the Chairman of the Nawalapitiya Urban Council. She was the first woman in the country to head an Urban Council.

Ilangakoon died on 10 February 1989, aged 69.

== See also ==
- List of political families in Sri Lanka
- Bandaranaike family
