= List of knights bachelor appointed in 1911 =

Knight Bachelor is the oldest and lowest-ranking form of knighthood in the British honours system; it is the rank granted to a man who has been knighted by the monarch but not inducted as a member of one of the organised orders of chivalry. Women are not knighted; in practice, the equivalent award for a woman is appointment as Dame Commander of the Order of the British Empire (founded in 1917).

== Knights bachelor appointed in 1911 ==
Date	Name	Notes	Ref
2 January 1911	The Hon. William Portus Cullen, LLD	Lieutenant-Governor of the State of New South Wales and Chief Justice of the Supreme Court" of the said State	
2 January 1911	Charles James Townshend	Chief Justice of the Supreme Court of Nova Scotia	
2 January 1911	Alfred van Waterschoodt Lucie Smith	Chief Justice of Trinidad and Tobago	
2 January 1911	The Hon. John Winthrop Hackett, LLD	Member of the Legislative Council of the State of Western Australia	
2 January 1911	John Bromhead Matthews	Chief Justice of the Supreme Court of the Bahama Islands	
2 January 1911	William Mackenzie	President of the Canadian Northern Railway Company	
2 January 1911	Solomon Christoffel Obeyesekere	Unofficial Member of the Legislative Council of the Island of Ceylon	
2 January 1911	Donald Mann	Vice-President of the Canadian Northern Railway Company	
2 January 1911	George Christie Gibbons, KC	in recognition of services in connection with the Treaty relating to Boundary Waters between Canada and the United States	
2 January 1911	Thomas Tait	lately Chairman of Railway Commissioners for the State of Victoria	
2 January 1911	The Hon. John Meiring Beck, MD	Senator of the Union of South Africa, one of the Delegates from the Cape of Good Hope to the South African National Convention	
2 January 1911	Thomas Hyslop	one of the Delegates from Natal to the South African National Convention	
2 January 1911	Johannes Gerard van Boeschoten	Mayor of Pretoria	
2 January 1911	Arthur Milford Ker, CIE	an Additional Member of the Council of the Lieutenant-Governor of the Punjab for making Laws and Regulation	
2 January 1911	Henry Edward Edleston Proctor	an Additional Member of the Council of the Governor of Bombay for making Laws and Regulations	
2 January 1911	Lt-Col. David Semple, MD	Royal Army Medical Corps; Director Central Research, Institute, Kasauli	
2 January 1911	William Heerlein Lindley		
23 February 1911	Herbert Fogelstrom Bartlett, ISO	a Commissioner of Inland Revenue	
23 February 1911	Robert William Aske, LLD		
23 February 1911	Captain John William Nott Bower	Commissioner of Police for the City of London	
23 February 1911	Charles Fortescue-Brickdale	Registrar of the Office of Land Registry	
23 February 1911	Capt Alfred John George Chalmers	Marine Department, Board of Trade	
23 February 1911	Sidney Colvin, DLitt	Keeper of Prints and Drawings at the British Museum	
23 February 1911	Horatio Bryan Donkin, MD	Medical Adviser to the Prison Commission and Director of Convict Prisons	
23 February 1911	Frederic Samuel Eve, FRCS	Senior Surgeon to the London Hospital	
23 February 1911	David Ferrier, MD, FRS		
23 February 1911	George Laurence Gomme, FSA	Clerk to the London County Council	
23 February 1911	George Green		
23 February 1911	Jesse Herbert	Barrister-at-Law	
23 February 1911	James Charles Inglis	General Manager of the Great Western Railway Company	
23 February 1911	Robert Ashton Lister		
23 February 1911	John Patrick Lynch		
23 February 1911	Joseph Lyons		
23 February 1911	George Newman, MD	Chief Medical Officer of the Board of Education	
23 February 1911	Arthur Priestley, MP		
23 February 1911	Joseph Michael Redmond, MD		
23 February 1911	John R. Roberts		
23 February 1911	Matthew G. Wallace	President of the Scottish Chamber of Agriculture	
23 February 1911	George Frederick Warner, DLitt	Keeper of MSS. and Egerton Librarian of the British Museum	
23 February 1911	Francis Webster		
23 February 1911	Henry J. Wood		
23 May 1911	Ernest Joseph Soares		
20 June 1911	William Edward Smith, CB	Superintendent of Construction Accounts and Contract Work, Admiralty	
20 June 1911	Reginald Arthur Egerton, CB	Secretary to the General Post Office, Dublin	
20 June 1911	Thomas Cave-Brown-Cave, CB	Special Commissioner, Royal Hospital, Chelsea	
20 June 1911	Anthony Alfred Bowlby, CMG, FRCS		
20 June 1911	Roger Casement, CMG	Consul-General at Rio de Janeiro	
20 June 1911	Frederick William Hewitt, MVO, MD, MRCS		
20 June 1911	William Ryland Dent Adkins, MP		
20 June 1911	William Maxwell Aitken, MP		
20 June 1911	George Alexander		
20 June 1911	Raymond Beck	Chairman of Lloyds	
20 June 1911	James Bell	Town Clerk of the City of London	
20 June 1911	Andrew Newton Brady		
20 June 1911	Richard Brayn, MRCS, LRCP	late Medical Superintendent, Broadmoor Criminal Lunatic Asylum	
20 June 1911	Harvey Cecil Buckingham	Sheriff of the City of London	
20 June 1911	William Pollard Byles, MP		
20 June 1911	Col. Edward Hildred Carlile, MP		
20 June 1911	Frederic Hymen Cowen, MusDoc		
20 June 1911	Alfred William Winterslow Dale, LLD	Principal of the University of Liverpool	
20 June 1911	Alexander Dempsey, MD		
20 June 1911	Frederick Eaton	Secretary to the Royal Academy	
20 June 1911	Harold Elverston, MP		
20 June 1911	Arthur John Evans, FRS		
20 June 1911	Hugh Fort	formerly Member of the Legislative Council of the Straits Settlements	
20 June 1911	Ernest George, ARA		
20 June 1911	William Guy Granet	General Manager of the Midland Railway	
20 June 1911	John Purser Griffith	Engineer of the Dublin Port and Docks Board	
20 June 1911	Col. Arthur Griffith-Boscawen, MP		
20 June 1911	Norman Hill	Secretary to the Liverpool Steamship Owners' Association	
20 June 1911	Henry James Johnson	President of the Incorporated Law Society	
20 June 1911	Charles Johnston	Alderman and Sheriff of the City of London	
20 June 1911	The Hon. Lyman Melvin Jones	Senator of the Dominion of Canada	
20 June 1911	Sidney Lee	Editor of the Dictionary of National Biography	
20 June 1911	The Hon. John McCall, MD	Agent-General in London for Tasmania	
20 June 1911	William Symington McCormick, LLD	Secretary to the Carnegie Trust for the Universities of Scotland	
20 June 1911	Joseph M'Grath, LLD	Secretary of the National University of Ireland	
20 June 1911	George Croydon Marks, MP		
20 June 1911	Frederic Mackenzie Maxwell	Chief Justice of the Colony of British Honduras	
20 June 1911	James Robert Mellor	Senior Master of the Supreme Court	
20 June 1911	The Hon. James Tennant Molteno, KC	Speaker of the House of Assembly of the Union of South Africa	
20 June 1911	George M. Paul	Deputy-Keeper of the Signet in Scotland	
20 June 1911	Claude Phillips	late Keeper of the Wallace Collection	
20 June 1911	William Plender	President of the Institute of Chartered Accountants	
20 June 1911	Alexander Rae		
20 June 1911	Walter Raleigh	Professor of English Literature at Oxford	
20 June 1911	Thomas Ratcliffe-Ellis	Secretary of the Federated Coalowners' Association	
20 June 1911	Gerald Hemmington Ryan	President of the Institute of Actuaries	
20 June 1911	John Edwin Sandys, LittD		
20 June 1911	Ernest Schiff		
20 June 1911	James Scott		
20 June 1911	Frank Short, RA		
20 June 1911	John Ward Spear, MP		
20 June 1911	Col. Charles John Stoddart		
20 June 1911	George Toulmin, MP		
20 June 1911	J. Wrench Towse, FRGS	Clerk to the Fishmongers' Company	
20 June 1911	Adolphus Hilgrave Turner	Procurator-General of Jersey	
20 June 1911	Thomas John Wadson	Speaker of the House of Assembly of the Bermuda Islands	
20 June 1911	Frederick Charles Wallis, MB, FRCS		
20 June 1911	Robert Patrick Wright	Agricultural Adviser to the Scottish Education Department	
20 June 1911	Richard Barter		
20 June 1911	Col. Lonsdale Hale		
20 June 1911	Claude Coventry Mallet, CMG	His Majesty's Minister Resident to the Republics of Panama and Costa Rica	
20 June 1911	Charles Henry Major	The Chief Justice of the Supreme Court of Fiji and Judicial Commissioner for the Western Pacific	
20 June 1911	Edwin Arney Speed, LLB	Chief Justice of Northern Nigeria	
20 June 1911	The Hon. Charles O'Grady Gubbins	Minister and Senator of the Union of South Africa	
20 June 1911	The Hon. Arthur Robert Guinness	Speaker of the House of Representatives of the Dominion of New Zealand	
20 June 1911	The Hon. Frank Madden	Speaker of the Legislative Assembly of the State of Victoria	
20 June 1911	The Hon. Joshua Strange Williams	Puisne Judge of the Supreme Court of the Dominion of New Zealand	
20 June 1911	The Rt Hon. Allen Taylor	Lord Mayor of the City of Sydney	
20 June 1911	Adolphe Basile Routhier	Judge of the Court of Admiralty, Quebec, in the Dominion of Canada	
20 June 1911	William Whyte	Vice-President of the Canadian Pacific Railway	
28 June 1911	Eustace Gurney	Lord Mayor of the City of Norwich. On the occasion of the King and Queen's visit to Norwich for the Royal Agricultural Show.	
1 July 1911	Charles Frederick Dyson	Mayor of the Borough of Windsor. On the King and Queen's return to Windsor after their Coronation.	
8 July 1911	Thomas Manley Deane	The Architect of the Royal College of Science in Dublin. On the occasion of the opening of the college.	
8 July 1911	Professor Walter Neil Hartley	On the occasion of the opening of the Royal College of Science in Dublin.	
12 July 1911	Frederick William Moore	Curator, Royal Botanic Gardens, Glasnevin	
13 July 1911	John Roberts	Mayor of Carnarvon. On the occasion of the King and Queen's visit to Carnarvon for the investiture of the Prince of Wales.	
13 July 1911	Thomas Roberts	Sheriff of the County of Carnarvon. On the occasion of the King and Queen's visit to Carnarvon for the investiture of the Prince of Wales.	
14 July 1911	Henry Lewis	Vice-Chairman of the Council of the University College of North Wales. On the occasion of the opening of the university college's new buildings.	
14 July 1911	Professor Edward Anwyl	On the occasion of the opening of the new Buildings of the University College of North Wales	
14 July 1911	William Goscombe John	On the occasion of the opening of the new Buildings of the University College of North Wales	
18 July 1911	Col. Archibald Mclnnes Shaw, VD	Lord Provost of the City of Glasgow	
21 July 1911	Thomas Smith Clouston, MD		
21 July 1911	James Ormiston Affleck, MD		
21 July 1911	Robert Stodart Lorimer, ARSA		
10 October 1911	Maj. Edmund Halbert Elliot, MVO	Ensign of His Majesty's Bodyguard of tho Yeomen of the Guard	
10 October 1911	Tom Scott Foster	Mayor of Portsmouth	
12 December 1911	James Molesworth Macpherson, CSI	Barrister-at-Law, Secretary to the Government of India in, the Legislative Department, and an Additional Member of the Council of the Governor-General for making Laws and Regulations	
12 December 1911	Cecil Michael Wilford Brett, CSI	Indian Civil Service, Puisne Judge of the High Court of -Judicature at Fort William in Bengal	
12 December 1911	Asutosh Mukharji, CSI	Puisne Judge of the High Court of Judicature at Fort William in Bengal, and Vice-Chancellor and Fellow of the Calcutta University	
12 December 1911	Henry George Richards, KC	Chief Justice of the High Court of Judicature, North-Western Provinces, and Vice-Chancellor of the Allahabad University	
12 December 1911	Hugh Daly Griffin	Puisne Judge of the High Court of Judicature, North-Western Provinces	
12 December 1911	Ralph Percy Ashton	President of the Mining and Geological Institute, Calcutta	
12 December 1911	Khan Bahadur Bezonji Dadabhoy Mehta		
12 December 1911	Cecil William Noble Graham	President, Bengal Chamber of Commerce, a Trustee of the Victoria Memorial Hall, and an Additional Member of the Council of the Governor-General for making Laws and Regulations	
12 December 1911	Lt-Col. Charles Henry Bedford, MD, DSc	Indian Medical Service, Chemical Examiner, Bengal	
12 December 1911	Hugh Stein Fraser	an Additional Member of the Council of the Governor of Fort St. George for making Laws and Regulations	
12 December 1911	Dinshaw Dhanjibhai Davar	Puisne Judge of the High Court of Judicature at Bombay	
12 December 1911	Shapurji Burjorji Broacha	Sheriff of Bombay	
12 December 1911	Rao Sahib Vasanji Trikamji Mulji	Head of the Jain community, a Justice of the Peace, and an Honorary Magistrate for the City of Bombay	
12 December 1911	Ibrahim Rahimtoola, CIE	a Justice of the Peace for the City of Bombay, a Fellow of the Bombay University, and an Additional Member of the Council of the Governor of Bombay for making Laws and Regulations	
12 December 1911	James Begbie	Secretary and Treasurer of the Bank of Bombay, and an Additional Member of the Council of the Governor of Bombay for making Laws and Regulation	
