= Montague Jayawickrama =

Sri Lankan politician

Major Deshamanya Montague Jayawickrama

2nd Governor of the North Western Province
- In office 1988–1993

Minister of Public Administration and Home Affairs
- In office 1977–1980
- President: J. R. Jayewardene
- Prime Minister: J. R. Jayewardene; Ranasinghe Premadasa
- Preceded by: T. B. Ilangaratne
- Succeeded by: K. W. Devanayakam

Minister of Transport and Works
- In office 1960–1960
- Prime Minister: Dudley Senanayake
- Preceded by: Robert Edward Jayatilaka
- Succeeded by: P. B. G. Kalugalla

Minister of Transport and Works
- In office 1954–1956
- Prime Minister: John Kotelawala
- Preceded by: John Kotelawala
- Succeeded by: Maithripala Senanayake

Member of Parliament for Weligama
- In office 4 August 1977 – 20 December 1988
- Preceded by: Panini Ilangakoon
- Succeeded by: Constituency abolished
- In office 30 March 1960 – 25 March 1970
- Preceded by: Panini Ilangakoon
- Succeeded by: Panini Ilangakoon
- In office 14 October 1947 – 18 February 1956
- Preceded by: Constituency created
- Succeeded by: Panini Ilangakoon

Personal details
- Born: 15 January 1911
- Died: November 16, 2001 (aged 90)
- Party: United National Party
- Spouse: Amara Amarasuriya
- Children: Devika, Kisani

Military service
- Branch/service: Ceylon Defense Force
- Years of service: 1934-1947
- Rank: Major
- Unit: Ceylon Light Infantry

Major Deshamanya Walter Geoffrey Montague "Monti" Jayawickrama (January 15, 1911 – November 16, 2001) was a Sri Lankan politician. He served as the Minister of Transport and Public Works (1952-1956) and the Minister of Public Administration, Home Affairs and Plantation Industries (1977-1987), having been elected from Weligama in Matara to the Sri Lankan Parliament. He was the Second Governor of the North Western Province of Sri Lanka.

== Early life ==
Born in Weligama, in Southern Ceylon to Walter Jayewickreme, a proctor and Lidia Margret, he had one sister Dorothina and one brother Errol. Educated at Richmond College, Galle, Jayewickreme studied at the Agriculture School in Peradeniya before becoming a planter.

== Military service ==
Joining the volunteer regiment Ceylon Light Infantry in 1934 as a Second Lieutenant. With the expansion of the Ceylon Defense Force for war time service during World War II, Jayewickreme gained rapid promotion. When the demobilisation began at the end of the war, Jayewickreme left the Ceylon Light Infantry, having been one of the few Ceylonese officers to reach the rank of Major.

== Political career ==
Jayewickreme entered politics when he was unanimously elected as President of Weligama Town Council on 4 January 1936. Undertaking the development and expansion of the Weligama town, Jayewickreme contested the 1947 General Election from the Weligama electorate. Weligama remained his constituency till 1987, having been re-elected in 1952, 1960, 1965 and again in 1977. His long standing opponent was Panini Ilangakoon who defeated Jayewickreme in 1956 and 1970, but was intern defeated by Jayewickreme in 1960 and 1977.

=== Member of Parliament ===
Having won a seat in the first Parliament of Ceylon, he was appointed Parliamentary Secretary to the Minister of Labour and Social Services by Prime Minister D. S. Senanayake in 1948.

=== Minister of Transport and Public Works ===
In 1952, he was appointed Parliamentary Secretary to the Minister of Transport and Public Works by Prime Minister Sir John Kotelawala, who held the portfolio of Transport and Public Works. In 1954, he was promoted to Minister of Transport and Public Works by Kotelawala and also appointed Parliamentary Secretary to the Minister of Defence and Foreign Affairs. As Minister of Transport and Public Works, he initiated the Ruhunu Kumari, Udarata Menike and Yal Devi train services of the Ceylon Government Railways. Major projects undertaken at the time include the Ella-Wellawaya road, Didula-World's End road, the Weligama Highway and the Mirissa Fishery Harbor. Operations Monty was launched during this time name after him to counter illegal immigration from South India.

=== Minister of Public Administration, Home Affairs and Plantation Industries ===
In 1977, he was appointed the Minister of Public Administration and Home Affairs by Prime Minister J.R. Jayewardene and later given the portfolio of Plantation Industries in the Jayewardene cabinet. During his tenure he developed the Tea Research Institute. A senior member of the United National Party, he served as its treasurer. On several occasions he served as Acting Prime Minister and Acting Leader of the House.

=== Retirement ===
He was injured in the 1987 grenade attack in the Parliament and shortly retired from active politics due to health issues. In 1988, he was appointed Governor of the North Western Province by President Premadasa and held the post till 1993.

== Family ==
Montague Jayewickreme married Amara Amarasuriya, they had two daughters, Devika and Kisani.

Political offices
| Preceded by Dingiri Banda Wijetunga | Governor of the North Western Province; 1989–1993 | Succeeded by Karunasena Kodituwakku |
