= Orient Club =

- Formation: 1894; 132 years ago
- Founder: Walter Pereira
- Location(s): 1 Rajakeeya Mawatha Colombo 7
- Coordinates: 6°54′21″N 79°51′35″E

The Orient Club is a private members' club, in Colombo, Sri Lanka. Established in 1894, it was the first Ceylonese-only social club in the country. Membership of the club is by nomination and election only.

== History ==
The club was founded in 1894, by a number of leading Ceylonese, including Walter Pereira. It was formed by the Sinhalese elite in response to the restrictions on Ceylonese membership by the exclusive British Colombo Club, established earlier in 1871, and denied membership to Europeans. Founding members included Frederick Dornhorst, James Peiris, Wilmont Arthur de Silva, E. J. Samerawickreme and F. R. Senanayake.

The club was initially located on Darley Road, before moving to "Lynden Hall" in Flower Road and then "Elscourt" in Turret Road before settling at its present premises in Racecourse Avenue (now known as Rajakeeya Mawatha). The Turret Road building now forms part of Bishop's College, an Anglican all-girls school.

== See also ==
- List of Sri Lankan gentlemen's clubs
