= James Peter Obeyesekere I =

Ceylonese legislator (????–1880)

James Peter Obeyesekere I (????-1880) was a Ceylonese legislator. He was an unofficial member of the Legislative Council of Ceylon representing the Sinhalese until his early death in 1880.

James Peter Obeyesekere was born the eldest son of Don Bastian Ferdinandus Wijesiri Guneratne Obeyesekere, Mudaliyar of Talpe Pattu and Cornelia Susanna Dias, née Bandaranaike, daughter of Don Solomon Dias Bandaranaike, Mudliyar of Udugaha. His younger brother was Solomon Christoffel Obeyesekere. His father died soon after he was born, and his mother returned to Colombo. She then married her cousin, Rev. Samuel William Dias Bandaranaike, and they had two boys and two girls. The oldest son, Felix Reginald was a Supreme Court judge.

He married Corneliya Henrietta Dias Bandaranaike, daughter of Gate Mudaliyar Don Christoffel Henricus Dias Bandaranaike and sister of Sir Solomon Dias Bandaranaike, Head Mudaliyar (1895-1928). Their sons were Sir James Peter Obeyesekere II, the last Maha Mudaliyar and Donald Obeyesekere, member of the State Council. Their daughter Hilda Obeyesekere married Sir Paul Edward Pieris of the Ceylon Civil Service.

== See also ==
- Bandaranaike family
