= Obeyesekere Walauwa =

Bungalow in Colombo, Sri Lanka

- Location within Colombo Municipality
- Alternative names: Maligawa

General information
- Type: Walauwa
- Architectural style: Tropical Neoclassical style
- Location: 19 Rajakeeya Mawatha, Cinnamon Gardens, Colombo, Sri Lanka
- Coordinates: 6°54′21.9″N 79°51′45.0″E
- Completed: 1890s
- Client: James Peter Obeyesekere II

Obeyesekere Walauwa, also known as Maligawa, (Sinhalese: Palace) is a large bungalow (as mansions are referred to locally), located at 19 Rajakeeya Mawatha, Colombo. A stately home in the tropical Neoclassical style, it was used as a town house by the Obeyesekere family. At the time of its construction, it was situated on a marsh at the edge of Cinnamon Gardens, a suburb of Colombo.

The house was built in the 1890s and contains a 2.0 ha (5 acres) garden and extravagant interior fittings. It was built by the wealthy Obeyesekere family and headed by Sir James Peter Obeyesekere II, Kt, MA, who was the First Mudaliyar, one of the highest posts available for a Ceylonese in the British Colonial Administration of Ceylon at the time.

In 1939, on request of the Royal College Colombo, Sir James granted the use of the house with its furniture for the school to use as a hostel after the school had attempted to reestablish one for students for several years. However, in December 1941 with the outbreak of World War II in the far east, the house and the Royal College premises were taken over by the British Army. The school was turned into a military hospital and the house soon became the officer's mess for the Royal Air Force, who had turned the Colombo Race Course into a temporary airfield.

Several years after the war, the house was returned to the Obeyesekere family, and it became the home of Deshamanya J.P. Obeyesekere III, former senator and minister of health and finance along with his wife Siva Obeyesekere, a former minister of health.
