= Weligama Electoral District =

Electoral district of Sri Lanka (1947-89)

Weligama electoral district was an electoral district of Sri Lanka between August 1947 and February 1989. The district was named after the town of Weligama in Matara District, Southern Province. The 1978 Constitution of Sri Lanka introduced the proportional representation electoral system for electing members of Parliament. The existing 160 mainly single-member electoral districts were replaced with 22 multi-member electoral districts. Weligama electoral district was replaced by the Matara multi-member electoral district at the 1989 general elections, the first under the proportional representation system.

== Members of Parliament ==
Key

Independent SLFP UNP

| Election | Member | Party | Term |
|---|---|---|---|
| 1947 | Montague Jayawickrama | United National Party | 1947 - 1956 |
| 1952 | Montague Jayawickrama | United National Party | 1947 - 1956 |
| 1956 | Panini Ilangakoon | Sri Lanka Freedom Party | 1956 -1960 |
| 1960 (March) | Montague Jayawickrama | United National Party | 1960 - 1970 |
| 1960 (July) | Montague Jayawickrama | United National Party | 1960 - 1970 |
| 1965 | Montague Jayawickrama | United National Party | 1960 - 1970 |
| 1970 | Panini Ilangakoon | Sri Lanka Freedom Party | 1970 1977 |
| 1977 | Montague Jayawickrama | United National Party | 1977 -1989 |

== Elections ==
=== 1947 Parliamentary General Election ===
Results of the 1st parliamentary election held between 23 August 1947 and 20 September 1947:

| Candidate | Party | Symbol | Votes | % |
|---|---|---|---|---|
| Montague Jayawickrama | United National Party | Umbrella | 11,255 | 42.95 |
| Edward Senaratne | | Star | 7,468 | 28.50 |
| A. B. Seneviratne | | Elephant | 5,212 | 19.89 |
| E. Y. D. Abeygunawardena | | Key | 1,422 | 5.43 |
| D. L. Senaratne | | Hand | 413 | 1.58 |
| Valid Votes | | | 25,770 | 98.35 |
| Rejected Votes | | | 433 | 1.65 |
| Total Polled | | | 26,203 | 100.00 |
| Registered Electors | | | 51,174 | |
| Turnout | | | | 51.20 |

=== 1952 Parliamentary General Election ===
Results of the 2nd parliamentary election held between 24 May 1952 and 30 May 1952:

| Candidate | Party | Symbol | Votes | % |
|---|---|---|---|---|
| Montague Jayawickrama | United National Party | Umbrella | 16,397 | 53.78 |
| Panini Ilangakoon | Sri Lanka Freedom Party | Star | 13,806 | 45.28 |
| Valid Votes | | | 30,203 | 99.06 |
| Rejected Votes | | | 286 | 0.94 |
| Total Polled | | | 30,489 | 100.00 |
| Registered Electors | | | 40,727 | |
| Turnout | | | | 74.86 |

=== 1956 Parliamentary General Election ===
Results of the 3rd parliamentary election held between 5 April 1956 and 10 April 1956:

| Candidate | Party | Symbol | Votes | % |
|---|---|---|---|---|
| Panini Ilangakoon | Sri Lanka Freedom Party | Hand | 18,648 | 57.27 |
| Montague Jayawickrama | United National Party | Elephant | 13,659 | 41.95 |
| Valid Votes | | | 32,307 | 99.23 |
| Rejected Votes | | | 252 | 0.77 |
| Total Polled | | | 32,559 | 100.00 |
| Registered Electors | | | 44,610 | |
| Turnout | | | | 72.99 |

=== 1960 (March) Parliamentary General Election ===
Results of the 4th parliamentary election held on 19 March 1960:

| Candidate | Party | Symbol | Votes | % |
|---|---|---|---|---|
| Montague Jayawickrema | United National Party | Elephant | 14,270 | 52.44 |
| Panini Ilangakoon | Sri Lanka Freedom Party | Hand | 10,240 | 37.63 |
| D. Wickremaratna | | Star | 1,709 | 6.28 |
| D. B. de S. Jayawardena | | Umbrella | 447 | 1.64 |
| G. P. J. Nanayakkara | | Eye | 271 | 0.99 |
| A. G. Piyasinghe | | Pair of Scales | 128 | 0.47 |
| Valid Votes | | | 27,065 | 99.46 |
| Rejected Votes | | | 147 | 0.54 |
| Total Polled | | | 27,212 | 100.00 |
| Registered Electors | | | 37,119 | |
| Turnout | | | | 73.31 |

=== 1960 (July) Parliamentary General Election ===
Results of the 5th parliamentary election held on 20 July 1960:

| Candidate | Party | Symbol | Votes | % |
|---|---|---|---|---|
| Montague Jayawickrema | United National Party | Elephant | 15,281 | 54.29 |
| Panini Ilangakoon | Sri Lanka Freedom Party | Hand | 12,741 | 45.26 |
| Valid Votes | | | 28,022 | 99.55 |
| Rejected Votes | | | 126 | 0.45 |
| Total Polled | | | 28,148 | 100.00 |
| Registered Electors | | | 37,119 | |
| Turnout | | | | 75.83 |

=== 1965 Parliamentary General Election ===
Results of the 6th parliamentary election held on 22 March 1965:

| Candidate | Party | Symbol | Votes | % |
|---|---|---|---|---|
| Montague Jayawickrema | United National Party | Elephant | 18,316 | 52.66 |
| Panini Ilangakoon | Sri Lanka Freedom Party | Hand | 16,271 | 46.78 |
| Valid Votes | | | 34,587 | 99.43 |
| Rejected Votes | | | 197 | 0.57 |
| Total Polled | | | 34,784 | 100.00 |
| Registered Electors | | | 44,912 | |
| Turnout | | | | 78.71 |

=== 1970 Parliamentary General Election ===
Results of the 7th parliamentary election held on 27 May 1970:

| Candidate | Party | Symbol | Votes | % |
|---|---|---|---|---|
| Panini Ilangakoon | Sri Lanka Freedom Party | Hand | 22,635 | 58.09 |
| S. S. Perera | United National Party | Elephant | 16,224 | 41.64 |
| Valid Votes | | | 38,859 | 99.73 |
| Rejected Votes | | | 107 | 0.27 |
| Total Polled | | | 38,966 | 100.00 |
| Registered Electors | | | 47,309 | |
| Turnout | | | | 82.36 |

=== 1977 Parliamentary General Election ===
Results of the 8th parliamentary election held on 21 July 1977:

| Candidate | Party | Symbol | Votes | % |
|---|---|---|---|---|
| Montague Jayawickrema | United National Party | Elephant | 25,440 | 55.95 |
| Chulpadmendra Dahanayake | Sri Lanka Freedom Party | Hand | 16,343 | 35.94 |
| H. G. S. Ratnaweera | Communist Party of Sri Lanka | Star | 3,560 | 7.83 |
| Valid Votes | | | 45,343 | 99.72 |
| Rejected Votes | | | 128 | 0.28 |
| Total Polled | | | 45,471 | 100.00 |
| Registered Electors | | | 54,430 | |
| Turnout | | | | 83.54 |
