= Felix Dias Bandaranaike =

Sri Lankan lawyer and politician

Minister of Finance
- In office 3 September 1975 – 18 May 1977
- Prime Minister: Sirimavo Bandaranaike
- Preceded by: N. M. Perera
- Succeeded by: Ronnie de Mel
- In office 21 July 1960 – 24 August 1962
- Prime Minister: Sirimavo Bandaranaike
- Preceded by: J. R. Jayewardene
- Succeeded by: C. P. de Silva

Minister of Justice
- In office 1970–1976
- Prime Minister: Sirimavo Bandaranaike
- Preceded by: A. F. Wijemanne
- Succeeded by: Ratnasiri Wickremanayake

Member of Parliament for Dompe
- In office 1960–1977
- Preceded by: Constituency Established
- Succeeded by: Sarathchandra Rajakaruna

Personal details
- Born: 5 November 1930 Colombo, British Ceylon
- Died: 26 June 1985 (aged 54) Colombo, Sri Lanka
- Party: Sri Lanka Freedom Party
- Spouse(s): Lakshmie Dias Bandaranaike (née Jayasundera)
- Children: Christine
- Education: Royal College, Colombo, University of Ceylon
- Occupation: Politician
- Profession: Lawyer

Felix R. Dias Bandaranaike (Sinhala:ෆීලික්ස් ඩයස් බණඩාරනායක) (5 November 1930 – 26 June 1985) was a Sri Lankan lawyer and politician, who served as Cabinet Minister of Finance, Parliamentary Secretary for the Prime Minister and Defence and External Affairs (de facto foreign minister) (1960–1965) and Cabinet Minister of Justice (1970–77) in the cabinet of Prime Minister Sirimavo Bandaranaike. He was a very popular person about the anti-corruption campaign and also known as the "virtual leader of the state" during the SLFP governments after the death of Prime minister S.W.R.D. Bandaranaike. He was very active in defeating two major coups against the government, one is 1962 attempted military coup and JVP's 1971 JVP Insurrection.

== Early life and education ==
Born on 5 November 1930 to Felix Reginald Dias Bandaranaike II, Judge of the Supreme Court and Freda Dias Abeysinghe, he had a sister Christine Manel Dias Bandaranaike and a half brother of Prof. Michael Dias Bandaranaike who held the Chair of Jurisprudence at the University of Cambridge, he was also a nephew of S. W. R. D. Bandaranaike. He was a scholar at Royal College, Colombo, at the University of Ceylon and at the Colombo Law College. Taking oaths as an Advocate, Felix Dias started his practice as in civil law.

== Political career ==
=== First Bandaranaike administration ===
Following the assassination of S. W. R. D. Bandaranaike, Felix Dias entered politics to help his uncle's party. He was elected to parliament from the electorate of Dompe in the 1960 March general election and again in the 1960 July general election from the Sri Lanka Freedom Party (SLFP). With formation of the SLFP lead government of Bandaranaike's widow Sirima Bandaranaike as Prime Minister. Felix Dias was appointed to the Cabinet as Minister of Finance, becoming the youngest Cabinet Minister of Finance in the Commonwealth, at the age of 29. He was concurrently appointed Parliamentary Secretary for Defence and External Affairs. In the early years Sirima Bandaranaike began to relay heavily on Felix Dias making him a powerful figure behind the Bandaranaike government. He influenced the governments actions in subduing the Satyagraha campaign in Jaffna in the 1961 and personally lead the crackdown and investigation into the 1962 military coup, rounding up the coup leaders and even personally interrogating them. He took many drastic steps to bring to leaders to bar, when the current law of the country was found inadequate to try the leaders he had the new Criminal Law Special Provision Act of 1962 drafted and passed by parliament. Due to problems in implementing rice subsidies he resigned from the post of minister. He retained his seat in the 1965 general election, but the SLFP was defeated and found itself in the opposition. While in opposition he established a private farm. Felix Dias was considered to be instrumental in the major public administration reforms that took place during this time. This included the abolition of the Ceylon Civil Service, which was replaced by the Ceylon Administrative Service and the replacement of the Village Headmen with that of Grama Sevaka.

=== Second Bandaranaike administration ===
He retained his seat in the 1970 general election with the landslide victory of the SLFP lead coalition, he was appointed Minister of Justice in Sirima Bandaranaike's second cabinet with the portfolio of Public Administration, Local Government and Home Affairs. The following year he played a major role in guiding the country though the 1971 JVP Insurrection. This included the establishment of the Criminal Justice Commission to prosecute the captured insurgents and the effective police investigation into routing out the JVP. During his term as Minister of Justice, the legal system saw many changes. The Court of Appeal of Sri Lanka was established in 1971, the Justice Law No. 44 of 1973 saw Advocates and Proctors merged into a single group of practitioners known as Attorneys-at-laws. In 1975, he was appointed Minister of Finance succeeding N. M. Perera after he and other LSSP ministers were sacked by Sirima Bandaranaike. Felix Dias continued many of the socialist economic policies that nationalized private estates and industries, focusing on a centralized economy. These policies resulted in corruption and inefficiency, lead to economic decline. A stout loyalist of Sirima Bandaranaike, he supported her in having the government extended by two more years using its majority in parliament, then the five years it was elected for ended in 1975. In 1977, SLFP faced a major defeat in the 1977 general election in which he lost his seat to Sarathchandra Rajakaruna of the United National Party.

=== Loss of civic rights ===
Felix filed several cases to prevent the abuse of power by the Government led by President Junius Richard Jayawardena. On 10 February 1978 the UNP government passed the Special Presidential Commissions of Inquiry Law No. 7 of 1978 to inquire into matters relating to alleged corruption during the 1970 – 1977 period. Felix successfully challenged the power of the Special Presidential Commission appointed to inquire against him. Immediately thereafter the Parliament passed the Special Presidential Commissions of Inquiry (Amendment) Act No. 4 of 1978 to enable the Commission to re-inquire into the allegations.

Thereafter, Two Supreme Court Judges and One Court of Appeal Judge was appointed to inquire into the allegations including those against Felix. Appearing in person and arguing on the basis that one Judge, K. C. E. de Alwis was unfit to hear cases due to his financial involvement with a person being investigated A. H. M. Fowzie. The Supreme Court held (2:1 majority with Neville Samarakoon CJ dissenting) that de Alwis was a person unfit to hold the office of a Commissioner. In this landmark case, it was held by Samarakoon CJ. that "Right‑minded people would not be unjustified if they look askance at other decisions of the 1st respondent. It might undermine that faith in the Commission itself which is necessary to command respect for its recommendations. This must be avoided, whatever the cost" reiterating emphatically the need to maintain judicial integrity and impartiality at all costs. He was deprived of his civic rights. He was later diagnosed with cancer and left active politics.

== Death ==
Bandaranaike died on 26 June 1985, after battling cancer.

In January 1986, Bandaranaike had his civic rights posthumously restored by a presidential decree issued by Jayewardene.

== Family ==
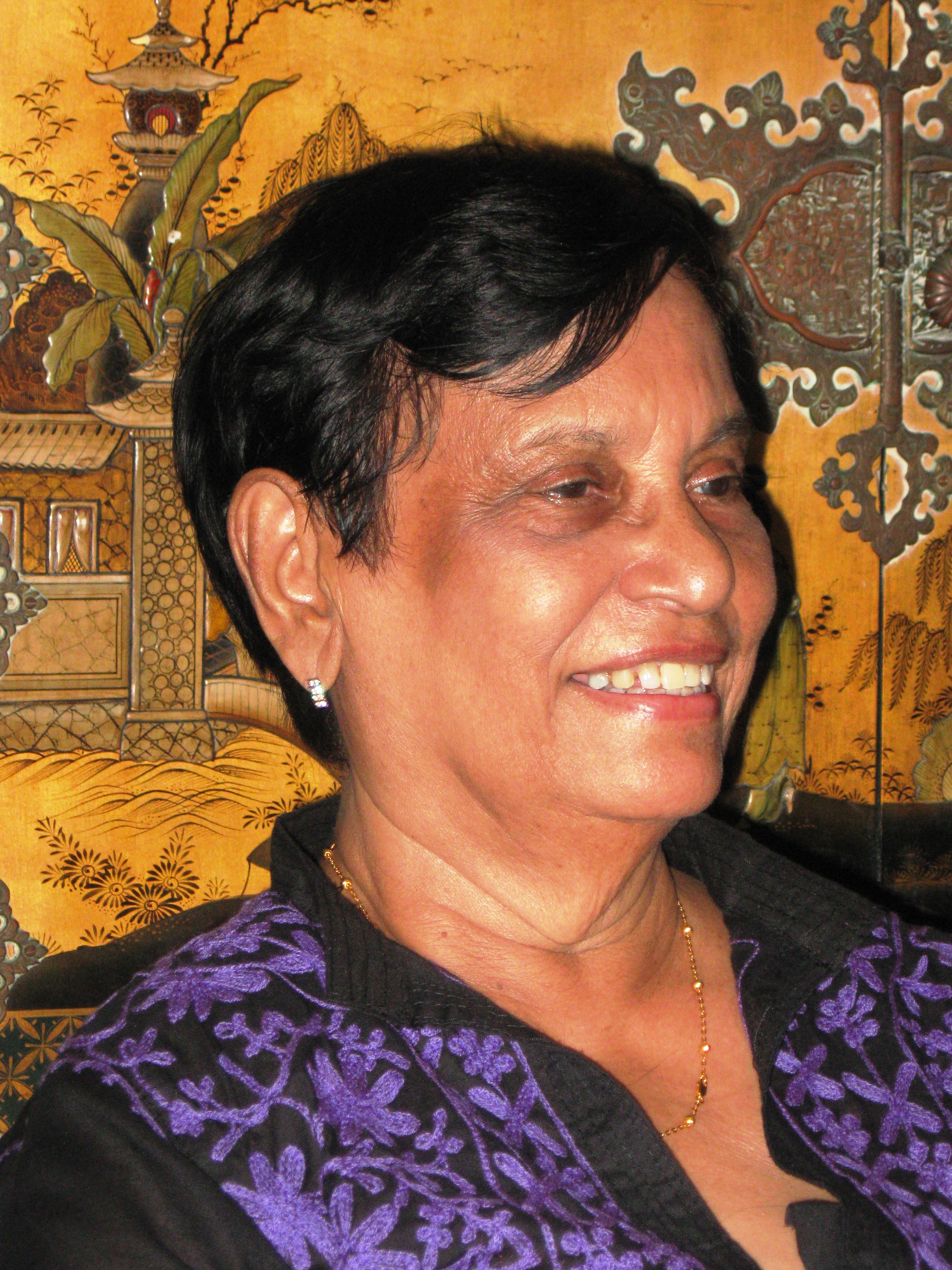
Mrs.Lakshmie Dias Bandaranaike (wife of Felix Dias Bandaranaike)

Felix Dias Bandaranaike married Elizabeth Muthulakshmi Jayasundera (known as Lakshmie Dias Bandaranaike) in 1953. She is a graduate of the University of Ceylon and Ceylon Law College and later became a member of the Inner Temple. They had a daughter named Christine. The family lived in the historic Maha Nuge Gardens in Colombo and he had his country seat at Weke Walawwa in Kirindawela.

== See also ==
- List of political families in Sri Lanka
- Attempted military coup in Ceylon, 1962

== Reading ==
- Sri Lanka: Third World Democracy (Studies in Commonwealth Politics and History, No 6) by James Jupp
