= Charles Ambrose Lorensz =

Lawyer, journalist and colonial era legislator from Ceylon

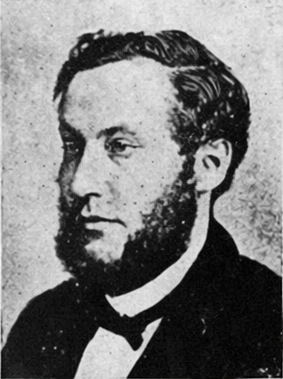
Charles Ambrose Lorensz portrait

Charles Ambrose Lorensz (1829–1871) was a lawyer, a journalist and a colonial era legislator from Ceylon. He was a member of the Legislative Council. He is credited for initiating Sri Lankan journalism and was the founder and editor of the island's first local news paper, the Ceylon Examiner. He was a District Judge and was an Acting Queen’s Advocate.

Born to a Burgher family, Lorensz was educated at the Colombo Academy, winning the Turnour Prize in 1846 with Frederick Nell. Beginning his legal practice in 1849, he became a barrister at the Lincoln's Inn in 1855. He was a member of the Royal Asiatic Society, Ceylon Branch .

After serving as the District Judge of Chilaw in 1855, he went back to being a practicing lawyer. He was appointed as a Burger non-official member of Legislative Council of Ceylon from 1856 to 1864, as opposed to the official members, who held their seats in the council by virtue of their offices in government. He was the first non-official member to claim and receive the right of introducing a private bill. An advocate for local government, he played a major role in the establishment of the Colombo Municipal Council, the first municipality, of which he was one of the first elected members from 1860 to 1870. He resigned from the Legislative Council in 1864.

Lorensz was credited with being the architect of the currency ordinance which enacted that Ceylon should switch from the British currency to its own of rupees and for coining the term Ceylonese. He played a major role in the reform and development of education, the amendment and codification of the law, and the inauguration of the Ceylon Government Railway.

In 1859, Lorensz and a syndicate purchased the Examiner, which was renamed as the Ceylon Examiner, thus becoming the first Ceylonese newspaper, of which he was the managing editor. Under Lorenz's leadership, the Ceylon Examiner was considered to be the newspaper representing Ceylonese, as opposed to European, interests.

He was part of the Macaulay of Ceylon along with James De Alwis, Frederick Nell and his brother Louis, John Prins, Charles Ferdinands and Dandris de Silva Gunaratna inspired by the Young England movement.

The Lorensz Scholarship is awarded at Royal College Colombo his old alma mater in his memory since 1876.

In August 2, 2024, The Ceylon Journal was established by historian Avishka Mario Senewiratne, who credits the influence of Lorenz and his works as its inspiration.

== Works ==
- Provisional Payment, 1856
- Editor, Law Reports, 1856–1870
- Notes on Kovil Practice, 1860
