= James Peter Obeyesekere II =

Ceylonese colonial-era headmen

James Peter Obeyesekere II Maha Mudaliyar, JP
- Coat of arms: 3x4.svg
- Tenure: 1928 – 1968
- Predecessor: Solomon Dias Bandaranaike
- Successor: Title abolished

Sir James Peter Obeyesekere II, Maha Mudaliyar, JP (1879–1968) was a Ceylonese colonial-era headmen. He was the last Head Mudaliyar and served as aide-de-camp to the British Governor of Ceylon and Governor General of Ceylon.

Born to James Peter Obeyesekere I, a barrister and Corneliya Henrietta Dias Bandaranaike, daughter of Gate Mudaliyar Don Christoffel Henricus Dias Bandaranaike and sister of Sir Solomon Dias Bandaranaike, Head Mudaliyar (1895-1928). He was the brother of Donald Obeyesekere, member of the State Council and his sister Hilda Obeyesekere married Sir Paul Edward Pieris of the Ceylon Civil Service.

Educated at S. Thomas' College, Mutwal and at Trinity College, Cambridge gaining a MA, he became a barrister and on his return to Ceylon became an advocate of the Supreme Court of Ceylon.

Having joined the colonial government service as a district commissioner, he succeeded his uncle Sir Solomon Dias Bandaranaike to the post of Head Mudaliyar (Maha Mudaliyar) in 1928. The post which was part of the staff of the British Governor, serving as his chief interpreter, native representative, adviser and aide-de-camp, therefore was one of the most powerful personalities in British colonial Ceylon. He was the last to hold the appointment serving under several British governors and governor generals in the post independence era. He was present when his nephew Solomon West Ridgeway Dias Bandaranaike took oaths as prime minister in front of the governor general Sir Oliver Goonetilleke on 12 April 1956. No other appointments to the post of Head Mudaliyar were made and it was dispensed with after the Bandaranaike government suspended British honors. His uniform was donated to the Colombo National Museum following his death by his family.

He was appointed a Knight Bachelor for public services in Ceylon in the 1936 New Year Honours by King George V and was appointed a justice of the peace by the Governor.

He married Amy Estelle Dias Bandaranaike and their son James Peter Obeyesekere III was elected a member of parliament and served as the acting Cabinet Minister of Health and Finance.

== See also ==
- List of political families in Sri Lanka
- Obeyesekere Walawa
- Bandaranaike family
