= James De Alwis =

Ceylonese lawyer

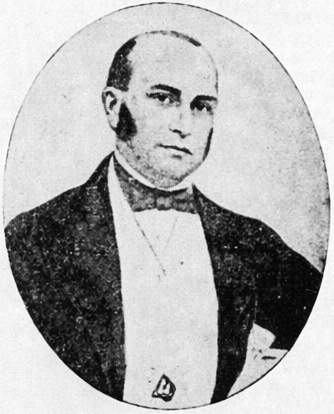
James De Alwis portrait

James De Alwis (1823–1878) was a lawyer, writer, poet and a prominent colonial era legislator from Ceylon. He was an unofficial member of the Legislative Council. He is remembered for his writings that included several works on Buddhism.

Educated at the Colombo Academy as one of its first students, he was part of the Macaulay of Ceylon along with Frederick Nell and his brother Louis, Charles Ambrose Lorensz, John Prins, Charle Ferdinands and Dandris de Silva Gunaratna inspired by the Young England movement.

Qualified as a Proctor, he went on to become an Advocate and served as a District Judge and Police Magistrate. During his legal practice, his clients included Mudliyar Jeronis de Soysa (father of Sir Charles Henry de Soysa), Arunasalam Ponnambalam Mudliyar (father of Sir Ponnambalam Ramanathan) and S. Edirimanasingham, Mudaliyar of the Governor's Gate (grand uncle of Sir Ponnambalam Ramanathan)

Later he was appointed as an unofficial member of the Legislative Council of Ceylon; however he resigned together with George Wall, Charles Ambrose Lorensz, W. Thompson, John Capper and John Eaton on 15 November 1864 on a point of principle regarding the fiscal policy of the Government and its strict disregard to respect the procedures of the Legislative Council.

His eldest daughter Ezline Maria de Alwis married Sir Solomon Christoffel Obeyesekere and his third daughter Annie Lucy "Florence" D' Alwis married Felix Reginald Dias Bandaranaike I, who became a Judge of the Supreme Court of Ceylon.

== Works ==
- Buddhism, 1862
- An Introduction to Kachchayana's Grammar of the Pàli Language, 1863
- The Attanagalu Vansa (A History of the Temple of Attanagalla), 1866
- Buddhist Nirvána, 1868 (A review of Max Müller's Dhammapada)
- Sedatsangarawa

== References & External links ==
- From a Reader’s Bookshelf by Arjuna More on Thrift and Arthur Alvis
- Kumar Sangakkara steps forth like Young Ceylon
- Not promoting the pretensions of' ‘literary theory'
