= Felix Reginald Dias Bandaranaike II =

Ceylonese judge and lawyer

Puisne Justice of the Supreme Court of Ceylon

Personal details
- Education: Royal College Colombo, University of Cambridge

Felix Reginald Dias Bandaranaike II (Sinhala: ෆෙලික්ස් රෙජිනල්ඩ් ඩයස් බණඩාරනායක) (17 January 1891 – 26 October 1951) was a Ceylonese (Sri Lankan) judge and lawyer. He was a Puisne Justice of the Supreme Court of Ceylon.

Born to Felix Reginald Dias Bandaranaike I, he was educated at the Royal College Colombo and graduated from the University of Cambridge.

Dias Bandaranaike married “Princess” Joy De Livera, they had one son, Reginald Walter Michael Dias Bandaranaike. He later married Freda Dias Abeysinghe. Their children include Christine Manel Dias Bandaranaike and Felix Dias Bandaranaike.
