= Donald Obeyesekere =

Sri Lankan boxer and politician

Donald Obeyesekere, MBE (1888–1964) was a prominent colonial era legislator from Ceylon. He was a member of the State Council of Ceylon, the Legislative Council of Ceylon and was the President of the National Olympic Committee of Ceylon.

Educated at S. Thomas' College, Mt Lavinia and at the Colombo Academy, he gained a BA from Trinity College, University of Cambridge, where he won blues for boxing. He was called to the Bar at the Inner Temple. On his return to Ceylon he introduced boxing in the country. He was appointed a Member of the Order of the British Empire for public service.

He is the younger brother of Sir James Peter Obeyesekere II - Maha Mudliyar, uncle of James Peter Obeyesekere III and first cousin of SWRD Bandaranaike. He married Johanna Ethel Perera and they had five children; Danton, Corneliya, Asoka, Fredrick, Amelia and Alexander. The Donald Obeyesekere Prize is awarded at Royal College, Colombo in his memory.

== See also ==
- Obeyesekere Walawa
- List of political families in Sri Lanka
- Bandaranaike family
