= Felix Reginald Dias Bandaranaike I =

Reginald Felix Dias Bandaranaike I

Puisne Justice of the Supreme Court of Ceylon

Personal details
- Education: Colombo Academy, S. Thomas' College, Trinity Hall, Cambridge

Reginald Felix Dias Bandaranaike I (Sinhala: ෆෙලික්ස් රෙජිනල්ඩ් ඩයස් බණඩාරනායක; 26 July 1861 – 30 January 1947) was a Ceylonese (Sri Lankan) judge and lawyer. He was a Judge of the Supreme Court of Ceylon.

Born to Rev. Canon Samuel William Dias Bandaranaike, he was educated at S. Thomas' College and the Colombo Academy. He went on to Trinity Hall, Cambridge gaining a MA and LLM from the University of Cambridge. He apprenticed to Henry Fielding Dickens, KC and was admitted to the Inner Temple in 1887 and took oaths as an Advocate in Ceylon in 1888.

He started his practice as an Advocate, before joining the judicial service as Police Magistrate and Commissioner of Requests in Gampola. From 1893 to 1897 he served as Crown Counsel. He became the acting District Judge of Colombo in 1897, Additional District Judge in 1898 and District Judge in 1906. (Note: At that time, Ceylon was divided into four districts, one of which was Colombo. There was a District Court and a District Judge in each district. Judicial proceedings took place before the District Judge sitting with three assessors.) In 1902 he was among the Ceylonese representatives invited to attend the London Coronation of King Edward VII and Queen Alexandra. He was a member of the Royal Colonial Institute.

Dias Bandaranaike married Annie Lucy "Florence" D' Alwis, third daughter of James De Alwis, with whom he had three children who survived to adulthood. These were Dr Reginald Felix Dias Bandaranaike II, Annette Lena Dias Bandaranaike who married William Ilangakoon the first Sinhalese Attorney General of Ceylon and Samuel James Felix Dias Bandaranaike who served as an agriculture officer.
