= List of Sri Lankan cabinets =

This is a list of cabinets of Sri Lanka since 1947.

== Background ==
The Executive Council of Ceylon was the Executive Council created in British Ceylon by the British colonial administration on the recommendations of the Colebrooke-Cameron Commission along with the Legislative Council of Ceylon on March 13, 1833.

At its creation the Executive Council was headed by the Governor, along with five members appointed by the Governor. These five members were officials who held the posts of the Colonial Secretary, the Attorney General, the Auditor-General, the Treasurer and the General Officer Commanding, Ceylon. The Council exercised executive power and advised the governor. As a result of the First Manning Reforms three non-officials were elected to the executive council.

With enactment of the new constitution of the Dominion of Ceylon in 1947 the Executive Council was replaced by a National Cabinet.

== Cabinets ==
#	Cabinet	Took office	Left office	Head of state	Head of government	Governing party
1	D. S. Senanayake cabinet	24 September 1947	22 March 1952	George VI (1947–1952)	D. S. Senanayake	United National Party
2	Dudley Senanayake cabinet I	22 March 1952	12 October 1953	Elizabeth II (1952–1972)	Dudley Senanayake	United National Party
3	Kotelawala cabinet	12 October 1953	12 April 1956	Elizabeth II (1952–1972)	John Kotelawala	United National Party
4	S. W. R. D. Bandaranaike cabinet	12 April 1956	26 September 1959	Elizabeth II (1952–1972)	S. W. R. D. Bandaranaike	Sri Lanka Freedom Party
5	Dahanayake cabinet	26 September 1959	20 March 1960	Elizabeth II (1952–1972)	Wijeyananda Dahanayake	Sri Lanka Freedom Party
6	Dudley Senanayake cabinet II	21 March 1960	21 July 1960	Elizabeth II (1952–1972)	Dudley Senanayake	United National Party
7	Sirimavo Bandaranaike cabinet I	21 July 1960	25 March 1965	Elizabeth II (1952–1972)	Sirimavo Bandaranaike	Sri Lanka Freedom Party
8	Dudley Senanayake cabinet III	25 March 1965	29 May 1970	Elizabeth II (1952–1972)	Dudley Senanayake	United National Party
9	Sirimavo Bandaranaike cabinet II	29 May 1970	23 July 1977	William Gopallawa (1972–1978)	Sirimavo Bandaranaike	Sri Lanka Freedom Party
10	Jayewardene cabinet I	23 July 1977	7 September 1978	William Gopallawa (1972–1978)	J. R. Jayewardene	United National Party
11	Jayewardene cabinet II	7 September 1978	1980	J. R. Jayewardene		United National Party
12	Jayewardene cabinet III	1980	1988	J. R. Jayewardene		United National Party
13	Jayewardene cabinet IV	1988	2 January 1989	J. R. Jayewardene		United National Party
14	Premadasa cabinet I	2 January 1989	1990	Ranasinghe Premadasa		United National Party
15	Premadasa cabinet II	1990	1 May 1993	Ranasinghe Premadasa		United National Party
16	Wijetunga cabinet I	1 May 1993	19 August 1994	Dingiri Banda Wijetunga		United National Party
17	Wijetunga cabinet II	19 August 1994	12 November 1994	Dingiri Banda Wijetunga		SLFP led People's Alliance
18	Kumaratunga cabinet I	12 November 1994	18 October 2000	Chandrika Kumaratunga		SLFP led People's Alliance
19	Kumaratunga cabinet II	18 October 2000	7 December 2001	Chandrika Kumaratunga		SLFP led People's Alliance
20	Kumaratunga cabinet III	12 December 2001	2 April 2004	Chandrika Kumaratunga		UNP led United National Front
21	Kumaratunga cabinet IV	2 April 2004	19 November 2005	Chandrika Kumaratunga		SLFP led United People's Freedom Alliance
22	M. Rajapaksa cabinet I	19 November 2005	28 January 2007	Mahinda Rajapaksa		SLFP led United People's Freedom Alliance
23	M. Rajapaksa cabinet II	28 January 2007	23 April 2010	Mahinda Rajapaksa		SLFP led United People's Freedom Alliance
24	M. Rajapaksa cabinet III	23 April 2010	28 January 2013	Mahinda Rajapaksa		SLFP led United People's Freedom Alliance
25	M. Rajapaksa cabinet IV	28 January 2013	9 January 2015	Mahinda Rajapaksa		SLFP led United People's Freedom Alliance
26	Sirisena cabinet I	12 January 2015	17 August 2015	Maithripala Sirisena		UNP led United National Front
27	Sirisena cabinet II	24 August 2015	26 October 2018	Maithripala Sirisena		UNP led United National Front
28	Sirisena cabinet III	29 October 2018	15 December 2018	Maithripala Sirisena		SLFP–SLPP led coalition
29	Sirisena cabinet IV	20 December 2018	21 November 2019	Maithripala Sirisena		UNP led United National Front
30	G. Rajapaksa cabinet I	21 November 2019	12 August 2020	Gotabaya Rajapaksa		SLPP led Sri Lanka People's Freedom Alliance
31	G. Rajapaksa cabinet II	12 August 2020	3 April 2022	Gotabaya Rajapaksa		SLPP led Sri Lanka People's Freedom Alliance
32	G. Rajapaksa cabinet III	18 April 2022	9 May 2022	Gotabaya Rajapaksa		SLPP led Sri Lanka People's Freedom Alliance
33	G. Rajapaksa cabinet IV	12 May 2022	14 July 2022	Gotabaya Rajapaksa		SLPP–UNP led coalition
34	Wickremesinghe cabinet	22 July 2022	23 September 2024	Ranil Wickremesinghe		SLPP–UNP led coalition
35	Dissanayake cabinet I	24 September 2024	18 November 2024	Anura Kumara Dissanayake		JVP led National People's Power
36	Dissanayake cabinet II	18 November 2024	Incumbent	Anura Kumara Dissanayake		JVP led National People's Power

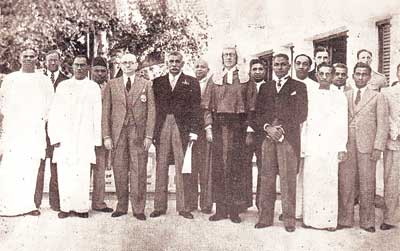
The First Cabinet of Ministers of Ceylon in 1947, headed by Rt Hon D.S. Senanayake as first Prime Minister of Ceylon. Also in the picture Sir Henry Monck-Mason Moore the Governor of Ceylon, and the Chief Justice.

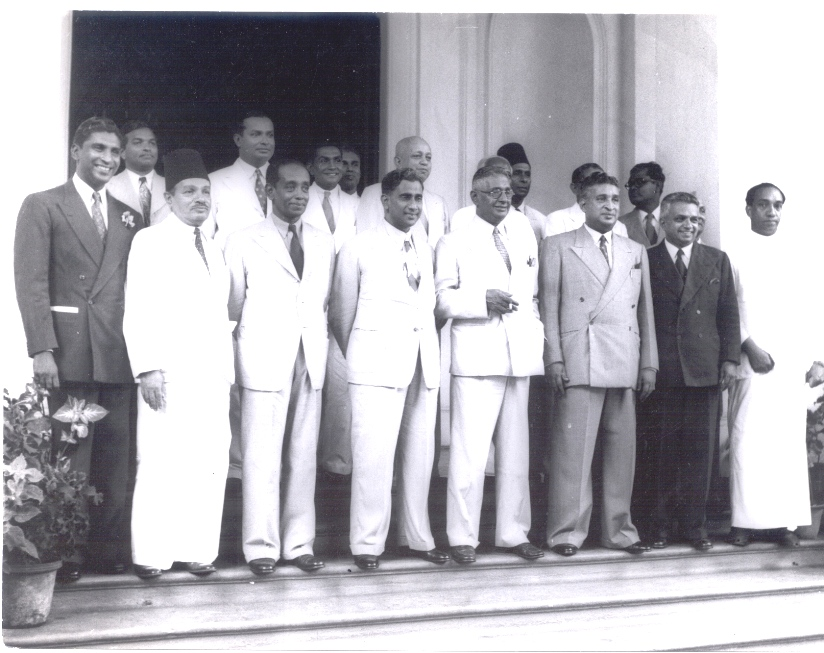
Cabinet of 1952 at Queen's House after swearing in ceremony on 17 June 1952

== See also ==
- Cabinet of Sri Lanka
- List of parliaments of Sri Lanka
