= Basnayake =

Basnayake is a Sri Lankan surname. Notable people with the surname include:

- Arthur Basnayake (1925–2015), Sri Lankan diplomat
- Asantha Basnayake (born 1987), Sri Lankan cricketer
- Bandula Basnayake (born 1947), Sri Lankan politician, former member of parliament and government minister
- B. M. U. D. Basnayake, Sri Lankan civil servant
- Eric Basnayake, Sri Lankan Judge
- Hema Henry Basnayake (born 1902), Sri Lankan judge
- Nirmala Basnayake, Canadian vocalist for Controller.controller
- Sinha Basnayake, Sri Lankan lawyer

== See also ==
- Basnayake Shalith Malinda Warnapura (born 1979), former professional Sri Lankan cricketer
- Tharanath Basnayaka, Sri Lankan politician
