= D. S. Senanayake cabinet =

- 1st Cabinet of Ceylon

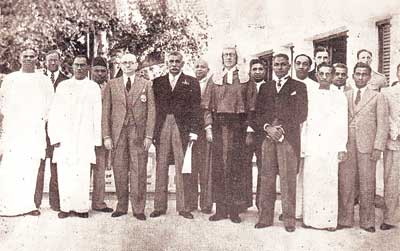
- The government in September 1947
- Date formed: 24 September 1947
- Date dissolved: 22 March 1952

People and organisations
- Monarch: George VI (1947–52); Elizabeth II (1952)
- Prime Minister: D. S. Senanayake
- Member parties: United National Party; Ceylon Labour Party; All Ceylon Tamil Congress (1948–52)
- Status in legislature: Majority coalition
- Opposition party: Lanka Sama Samaja Party
- Opposition leader: N. M. Perera

History
- Election: 1947
- Legislature term: 1st
- Predecessor: Second Board of Ministers of Ceylon
- Successor: Dudley Senanayake I

The D. S. Senanayake cabinet was the central government of Ceylon led by Prime Minister D. S. Senanayake between 1947 and 1952. It was formed in September 1947 after the parliamentary election and it ended in March 1952 with Senanayake's death. The Senanayake cabinet led Ceylon to independence in February 1948.

== Cabinet members ==
Name	Portrait	Party	Office	Took office	Left office	Refs
D. S. Senanayake		United National Party	Prime Minister	24 September 1947	22 March 1952	
D. S. Senanayake		United National Party	Minister of Defence and External Affairs	24 September 1947	22 March 1952	
H. W. Amarasuriya		United National Party	Minister of Trade and Commerce	14 December 1948	(Note: Continued to hold same office in next cabinet.)	
S. W. R. D. Bandaranaike		United National Party	Minister of Health and Local Government	26 September 1947	12 July 1951	
George E. de Silva			Minister of Industries, Industrial Research and Fisheries	26 September 1947	1948	
A. E. Goonesinha		Ceylon Labour Party	Minister Without Portfolio	1948		
Senator Oliver Goonetilleke			Minister of Home Affairs and Rural Development	26 September 1947	1948	
Senerat Gunewardene			Minister Without Portfolio	26 September 1947	1948	
T. B. Jayah			Minister of Labour and Social Services	26 September 1947	1950	
J. R. Jayewardene		United National Party	Minister of Finance	26 September 1947		
John Kotelawala		United National Party	Minister of Transport and Works	26 September 1947		
E. A. Nugawela			Minister of Education	26 September 1947		
G. G. Ponnambalam		All Ceylon Tamil Congress	Minister of Industries, Industrial Research and Fisheries	3 September 1948		
Senator Lalita Rajapaksa		United National Party	Minister of Justice	26 September 1947		
A. Ratnayake			Minister of Food and Cooperative Undertakings	26 September 1947		
Dudley Senanayake		United National Party	Minister of Agriculture and Lands	26 September 1947	26 March 1952	
C. Sittampalam		Independent	Minister of Posts and Telecommunication	26 September 1947		
C. Sittampalam		Independent	Minister of Industries, Industrial Research and Fisheries	1948	1948	
C. Suntharalingam		Independent	Minister of Trade and Commerce	26 September 1947	December 1948	
Senator Edwin Wijeyeratne			Minister of Home Affairs and Rural Development	1948		

== Parliamentary secretaries ==
Name	Portrait	Party	Office	Took office	Left office	Refs
Simon Abeywickrema			Parliamentary Secretary to the Minister of Transport	1947	2 May 1948	
P. B. Bulankulame			Parliamentary Secretary to the Minister of Agriculture and Lands	1947		
George R. de Silva			Parliamentary Secretary to the Minister of Justice	1947		
A. E. Goonesinha		Ceylon Labour Party	Parliamentary Secretary to the Minister of Labour	1947		
L. L. Hunter			Parliamentary Secretary to the Minister of Finance	20 September 1950		
Hameed Hussain Sheikh Ismail			Parliamentary Secretary to the Minister of Food	1947		
Senator Herbert Eric Jansz			Parliamentary Secretary to the Minister of Finance	17 May 1948	10 September 1950	
A. P. Jayasuriya			Parliamentary Secretary to the Minister of Posts	1947		
M. S. Kariapper		United National Party	Parliamentary Secretary to the Minister of Home Affairs	1947		
V. Nalliah		Independent	Parliamentary Secretary to the Minister of Health	1947		
H. de Z. Siriwardena			Parliamentary Secretary to the Minister of Industries	1947		

== See also ==
- Cabinet Office (Sri Lanka)

== Notes ==
Government offices
Preceded by None	Cabinets of Sri Lanka; 1947–1952	Succeeded by First Dudley Senanayake cabinet
