= First Dudley Senanayake cabinet =

- 2nd Cabinet of Ceylon

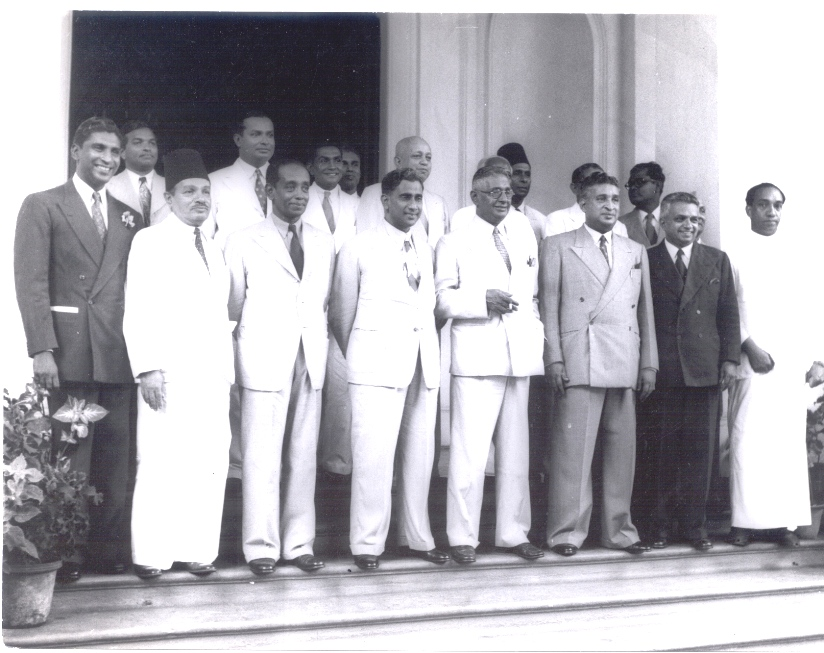
- The cabinet in June 1952
- Date formed: 26 March 1952
- Date dissolved: 12 October 1953

People and organisations
- Monarch: Elizabeth II
- Prime Minister: Dudley Senanayake
- Member parties: United National Party; All Ceylon Tamil Congress; Ceylon Labour Party
- Status in legislature: Majority coalition
- Opposition party: Lanka Sama Samaja Party (1952); Sri Lanka Freedom Party (1952–53)
- Opposition leader: N. M. Perera (1952); S. W. R. D. Bandaranaike (1952–53)

History
- Election: 1952
- Legislature terms: 1st, 2nd
- Predecessor: D. S. Senanayake
- Successor: Kotelawala

The First Dudley Senanayake cabinet was the central government of Ceylon led by Prime Minister Dudley Senanayake between 1952 and 1953. It was formed in March 1952 after the death of Senanayake's predecessor D. S. Senanayake and it ended in October 1953 with Senanayake's resignation.

== Cabinet members ==
Name	Portrait	Party	Office	Took office	Left office	Refs
Dudley Senanayake		United National Party	Prime Minister	26 March 1952	12 October 1953	
Dudley Senanayake		United National Party	Minister of Defence and External Affairs	26 March 1952		
Dudley Senanayake		United National Party	Minister of Health and Local Government	26 March 1952	1952	
H. W. Amarasuriya		United National Party	Minister of Trade and Commerce	(Note: Continuation of same office held in previous cabinet.)	1952	
M. D. Banda			Minister of Education	1952		
P. B. Bulankulame			Minister of Agriculture and Lands	26 March 1952	1952	
P. B. Bulankulame			Minister of Lands and Land Development	19 June 1952		
A. E. Goonesinha		Ceylon Labour Party	Minister Without Portfolio		1952	
Senator Oliver Goonetilleke			Minister of Agriculture and Food	19 June 1952		
J. R. Jayewardene		United National Party	Minister of Finance		13 October 1953	
M. C. M. Kaleel			Minister of Labour	1952		
C. W. W. Kannangara			Minister of Local Government	19 June 1952		
John Kotelawala		United National Party	Minister of Transport and Works			
V. Nalliah		United National Party	Minister of Posts and Information	19 June 1952	12 July 1952	
S. Natesan		United National Party	Minister of Posts and Information	1952		
E. A. Nugawela			Minister of Education		1952	
E. A. Nugawela			Minister of Health	1952		
G. G. Ponnambalam		All Ceylon Tamil Congress	Minister of Industries and Fisheries			
Senator Lalita Rajapaksa			Minister of Justice			
A. Ratnayake			Minister of Food and Cooperative Undertakings		1952	
A. Ratnayake			Minister of Home Affairs	1952		
R. G. Senanayake			Minister of Commerce and Trade	19 June 1952		
C. Sittampalam		Independent	Minister of Posts and Telecommunication		1952	
Senator Edwin Wijeyeratne			Minister of Home Affairs and Rural Development		1952	

== Parliamentary secretaries ==
Name	Portrait	Party	Office	Took office	Left office	Refs
C. E. Attygalle			Parliamentary Secretary to the Minister of Health			
L. L. Hunter			Parliamentary Secretary to the Minister of Finance		2 April 1952	
L. L. Hunter			Parliamentary Secretary to the Minister of Finance	2 June 1952	29 April 1953	
M. N. Ibrahim			Parliamentary Secretary to the Minister of Local Government			
T. F. Jayawardena			Parliamentary Secretary to the Minister of Labour			
Montague Jayawickrama			Parliamentary Secretary to the Minister of Defence and External Affairs			
N. H. Keerthiratne		United National Party	Parliamentary Secretary to the Minister of Posts and Information			
V. Kumaraswamy		All Ceylon Tamil Congress	Parliamentary Secretary to the Minister of Agriculture and Food			
T. B. Panabokke			Parliamentary Secretary to the Minister of Justice			
V. G. W. Ratnayake			Parliamentary Secretary to the Minister of Lands and Land Development			
Maithripala Senanayake			Parliamentary Secretary to the Minister of Home Affairs		September 1952	

== See also ==
- Cabinet Office (Sri Lanka)
- Hartal 1953

== Notes ==
Government offices
Preceded by D. S. Senanayake cabinet	Cabinets of Sri Lanka; 1952–1953	Succeeded by Kotelawala cabinet
