= Ministry of Justice, Prisons Affairs and Constitutional Reforms =

Government ministry of Sri Lanka

- අධිකරණ අමාත්‍යාංශය நீதி அமைச்சு

Agency overview
- Jurisdiction: Government of Sri Lanka
- Headquarters: Superior Courts Complex, Colombo 12; 6.935221°N 79.861824°E
- Minister responsible: Harshana Nanayakkara, Minister of Justice
- Agency executive: Ayesha Jinasena, Ministry Secretary
- Child agencies: Department of the Attorney General; Debt Conciliation Board; Department of the Legal Draftsman; Department of Public Trustee; Judicial and Reforms Unit; Law Commission of Sri Lanka; Legal Aid Commission of Sri Lanka; Mediation Boards Commission; National Authority for The Protection of Victims of Crimes and Witnesses; Office of the Registrar of the Supreme Court; Office of the Secretary of Labour Tribunals; Sri Lanka Judge’s Institute; Sri Lanka Law College; Superior Courts Complex Board of Management; Training Schools for Youthful Offenders
- Website: moj.gov.lk

The Ministry of Justice, Prisons Affairs and Constitutional Reforms (Note: (Sinhala: අධිකරණ, බන්ධනාගාර කටයුතු හා ආණ්ඩුක්‍රම ව්‍යවස්ථා ප්‍රතිසංස්කරණ අමාත්‍යාංශය; Tamil: நீதி, சிறைச்சாலை நடவடிக்கைகள் மற்றும் அரசியலமைப்பு மறுசீரமைப்பு அமைச்சு)) is the cabinet ministry of the Government of Sri Lanka responsible for the implementation of policies, plans and programmes for the administration of the country's justice system, and thereby administers its courts and prisons. Wijeyadasa Rajapakshe is the incumbent Minister of Justice as of 20 May 2022.

== History ==
The post was established in 1947 under the Soulbury Constitution as one of two fixed ministerial portfolios, the other being the Ministry of Finance. The post took over several functions of the previous colonial post of Legal Secretary. The Soulbury Constitution mandated that the appointee to the post of Minister of Justice should be from the Senate of Ceylon. This provision was removed following the abolishion of the Senate in October 1971. Since 1947, it has been tradition to appoint a lawyer to the post, with a few exceptions.

== Roles and responsibility ==
The ministry does not have oversight of policing, which comes under the Ministry of Defence.

=== Departments ===
- Department of the Attorney General
- Department of the Legal Draftsman
- Department of Public Trustee
- Judicial and Reforms Unit
- Mediation Boards Commission
- Law Commission of Sri Lanka
- Legal Aid Commission of Sri Lanka
- Debt Conciliation Board
- National Authority for The Protection of Victims of Crimes and Witnesses
- Office of the Registrar of the Supreme Court
- Office of the Secretary of Labour Tribunals
- Sri Lanka Judge’s Institute
- Sri Lanka Law College
- Superior Courts Complex Board of Management
- Training Schools for Youthful Offenders

=== Appointments ===
It also has the authority to appoint individuals to the positions of:

- Justice of the Peace
- Justice of the Peace and Unofficial Magistrate
- Commissioner for Oaths
- Sudden Death Inquirers
- Sworn Translator

== List of ministers ==
Parties

Sri Lanka Freedom Party United National Party Sri Lanka Muslim Congress Sri Lanka Podujana Peramuna

Name	Portrait	Party	Tenure	Head(s) of Government
Lalitha Rajapaksa		United National Party	26 September 1947 – 1953	D. S. Senanayake; Dudley Senanayake
E. B. Wikramanayake		United National Party	1953 – 1956	John Kotelawala
M. W. H. de Silva		Sri Lanka Freedom Party	1956 – June 1959	S. W. R. D. Bandaranaike
Valentine S. Jayawickrema		Sri Lanka Freedom Party	June 1959 – 1960	S. W. R. D. Bandaranaike; Wijeyananda Dahanayake
E. J. Cooray		United National Party	23 March 1960 – 21 July 1960	Dudley Senanayake
Sam Fernando		Sri Lanka Freedom Party	23 July 1960 – March 1965	Sirimavo Bandaranaike
A. F. Wijemanne		United National Party	March 1965 – 1970	Dudley Senanayake
Felix Dias Bandaranaike		Sri Lanka Freedom Party	1970 – 1976	Sirimavo Bandaranaike
Ratnasiri Wickremanayake	Ratnasiri Wickremanayake	Sri Lanka Freedom Party	1976 – 1977	Sirimavo Bandaranaike
K. W. Devanayagam		United National Party	23 July 1977 – 14 February 1980	J. R. Jayewardene
Nissanka Wijeyeratne	Nissanka Wijeyeratne	United National Party	14 February 1980 – 1988	J. R. Jayewardene
Vincent Perera		United National Party	1989 – 1990	Ranasinghe Premadasa
Abdul Cader Shahul Hameed		United National Party		Ranasinghe Premadasa
Harold Herath		United National Party	1993 – 1994	Dingiri Banda Wijetunga
G. L. Peiris	G. L. Peiris	Sri Lanka Freedom Party	1994 – 2001	Chandrika Kumaratunga
W. J. M. Lokubandara	W. J. M. Lokubandara	United National Party	2001 – 2004	Chandrika Kumaratunga
Amarasiri Dodangoda		Sri Lanka Freedom Party	2004 – 30 May 2009	Chandrika Kumaratunga; Mahinda Rajapaksa
Milinda Moragoda		Sri Lanka Freedom Party	30 May 2009 – 23 April 2010	Mahinda Rajapaksa
Athauda Seneviratne		Sri Lanka Freedom Party	23 April 2010 – 22 November 2010	Mahinda Rajapaksa
Rauff Hakeem		Sri Lanka Muslim Congress	22 November 2010 – 28 December 2014	Mahinda Rajapaksa
Wijeyadasa Rajapakshe		United National Party	12 January 2015 - 23 August 2017	Maithripala Sirisena
Thalatha Atukorale		United National Party	25 August 2017 - 22 November 2019	Maithripala Sirisena
Nimal Siripala de Silva	Nimal Siripala de Silva	Sri Lanka Freedom Party	22 November 2019 - 12 August 2020	Gotabaya Rajapaksa
Ali Sabry		Sri Lanka Podujana Peramuna	12 August 2020 - 3 April 2022	Gotabaya Rajapaksa
Office Vacant			3 April 2022 - 26 April 2022	Gotabaya Rajapaksa
Ali Sabry		Sri Lanka Podujana Peramuna	26 April 2022 - 9 May 2022	Gotabaya Rajapaksa
Wijeyadasa Rajapakshe		Independent	20 May 2022 - Present	Gotabaya Rajapaksa

== See also ==
- Minister of Justice, Prisons Affairs and Constitutional Reforms
