= S. W. R. D. Bandaranaike cabinet =

- 4th Cabinet of Ceylon

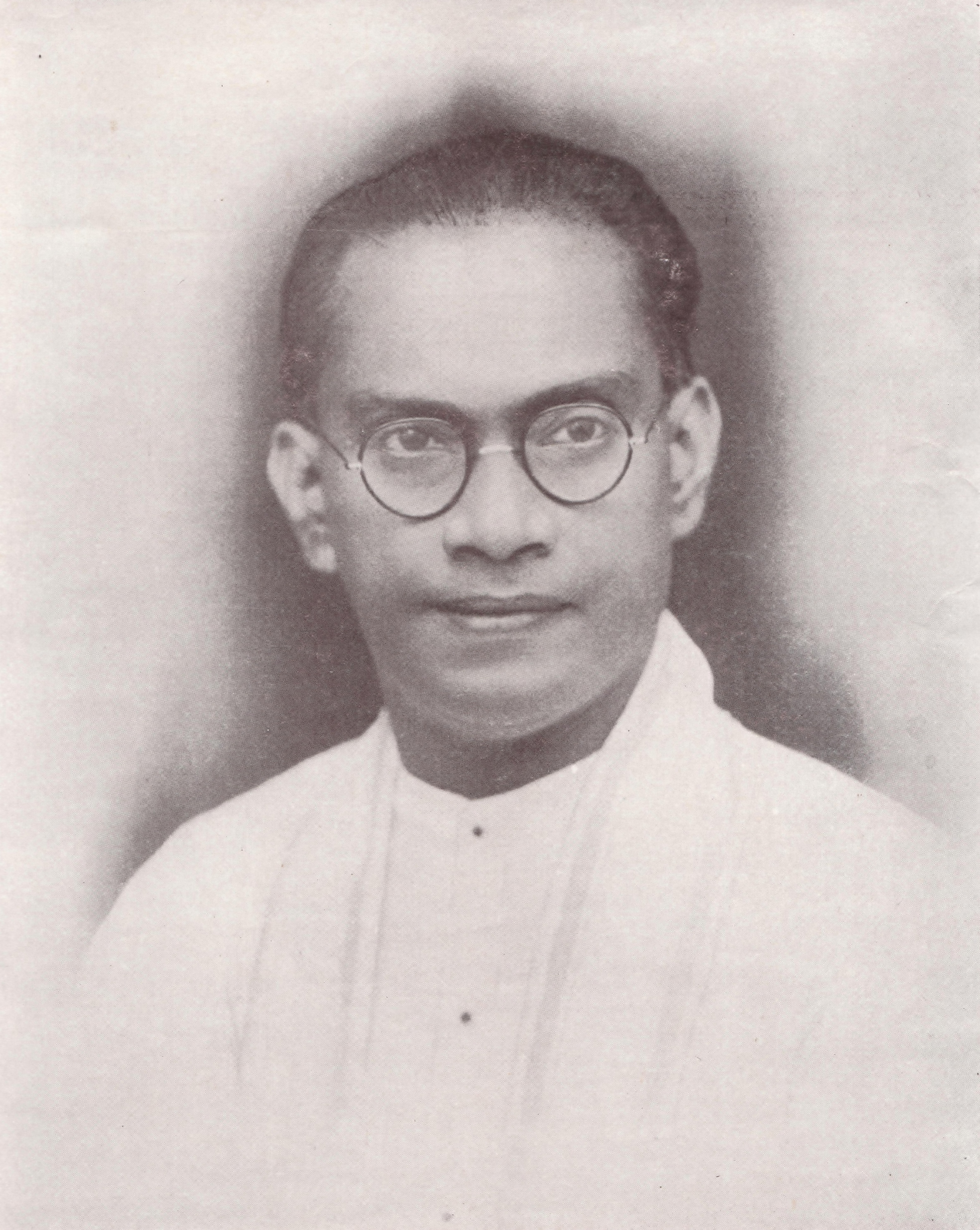
- Date formed: 12 April 1956
- Date dissolved: 26 September 1959

People and organisations
- Monarch: Elizabeth II
- Prime Minister: S. W. R. D. Bandaranaike
- Member parties: Sri Lanka Freedom Party; Sinhala Language Front; Viplavakari Lanka Sama Samaja Party (1956–59); Independents
- Status in legislature: Majority government (1956–59); Minority government (1959)
- Opposition party: Lanka Sama Samaja Party
- Opposition leader: N. M. Perera

History
- Election: 1956
- Legislature term: 3rd
- Predecessor: Kotelawala
- Successor: Dahanayake

The S. W. R. D. Bandaranaike cabinet was the central government of Ceylon led by Prime Minister S. W. R. D. Bandaranaike from 1956 to 1959. It was formed in April 1956 after the parliamentary election and ended in September 1959 with Bandaranaike's assassination.

== Cabinet members ==
Name	Portrait	Party	Office	Took office	Left office	Refs
S. W. R. D. Bandaranaike		Sri Lanka Freedom Party	Prime Minister	12 April 1956	26 September 1959	
S. W. R. D. Bandaranaike		Sri Lanka Freedom Party	Minister of Defence and External Affairs	12 April 1956	26 September 1959	
W. Dahanayake		Sinhala Language Front	Minister of Education			
C. P. de Silva		Sri Lanka Freedom Party	Minister of Lands and Land Development			
C. P. de Silva		Sri Lanka Freedom Party	Minister of Agriculture	9 June 1959	(Note: Continued to hold same office in next cabinet.)	
Senator M. W. H. de Silva			Minister of Justice		June 1959	
William de Silva		Viplavakari Lanka Sama Samaja Party	Minister of Industries and Fisheries		18 May 1959	
Stanley de Zoysa		Sri Lanka Freedom Party	Minister of Finance	12 April 1956		
Philip Gunawardena		Viplavakari Lanka Sama Samaja Party	Minister of Agriculture and Food	12 April 1956	18 May 1959	
T. B. Ilangaratne		Sri Lanka Freedom Party	Minister of Labour, Housing and Social Services	12 April 1956		
Senator A. P. Jayasuriya			Minister of Home Affairs	12 April 1956		
Senator Valentine S. Jayawickrema			Minister of Justice	June 1959		
P. B. G. Kalugalla		Sri Lanka Freedom Party	Minister of Cultural Affairs and Social Services	9 June 1959		
Jayaweera Kuruppu		Sri Lanka Freedom Party	Minister of Local Government and Cultural Affairs			
C. A. S. Marikar	C.A.S Marikar	Sri Lanka Freedom Party	Minister of Posts, Broadcasting and Information	12 April 1956		
W. J. C. Munasinha		Sri Lanka Freedom Party	Minister of Industries and Fisheries	9 June 1959		
Maithripala Senanayake		Sri Lanka Freedom Party	Minister of Transport and Works	12 April 1956		
R. G. Senanayake		Independent	Minister of Commerce and Trade	12 April 1956		
Senator Sarath Wijesinha			Minister of Nationalised Services and Road Transport			
Vimala Wijewardene		Sri Lanka Freedom Party	Minister of Health	12 April 1956		
Vimala Wijewardene		Sri Lanka Freedom Party	Minister of Local Government and Housing	9 June 1959		

== Parliamentary secretaries ==
Name	Portrait	Party	Office	Took office	Left office	Refs
Henry Abeywickrema		Sri Lanka Freedom Party	Parliamentary Secretary to the Minister of Transport and Works			
W. P. G. Ariyadasa		Sri Lanka Freedom Party	Parliamentary Secretary to the Minister of Posts, Broadcasting and Information			
C. R. Beligammana		Sri Lanka Freedom Party	Parliamentary Secretary to the Minister of Local Government and Cultural Affairs			
M. P. de Zoysa		Sri Lanka Freedom Party	Parliamentary Secretary to the Minister of Labour, Housing and Social Services			
Andrew Dissanayake		Sri Lanka Freedom Party	Parliamentary Secretary to the Minister of Nationalised Services and Shipping	1959		
Hugh Fernando		Independent	Parliamentary Secretary to the Minister of Agriculture and Food			
I. M. R. A. Iriyagolla		Independent	Parliamentary Secretary to the Minister of Home Affairs			
P. B. G. Kalugalla		Sri Lanka Freedom Party	Parliamentary Secretary to the Minister of Health			
M. S. Kariapper			Parliamentary Secretary to the Minister of Justice			
Nimal Karunatilake		Sri Lanka Freedom Party	Parliamentary Secretary to the Minister of Finance	18 November 1958	19 May 1959	
M. B. W. Mediwake		Sri Lanka Freedom Party	Parliamentary Secretary to the Minister of Local Government and Cultural Affairs			
D. B. Monnekulama		Sri Lanka Freedom Party	Parliamentary Secretary to the Minister of Nationalised Services and Road Transport			
W. J. C. Munasinha		Sri Lanka Freedom Party	Parliamentary Secretary to the Minister of Industries and Fisheries			
M. M. Mustapha			Parliamentary Secretary to the Minister of Finance	25 June 1959		
D. A. Rajapaksa		Sri Lanka Freedom Party	Parliamentary Secretary to the Minister of Lands and Land Development			
Lakshman Rajapaksa		Viplavakari Lanka Sama Samaja Party	Parliamentary Secretary to the Minister of Commerce and Trade			
K. M. P. Rajaratna		National Liberation Front	Parliamentary Secretary			
Mahanama Samaraweera		Sri Lanka Freedom Party	Parliamentary Secretary to the Minister of Justice			
Mahanama Samaraweera		Sri Lanka Freedom Party	Parliamentary Secretary to the Minister of Home Affairs			
T. B. Subasinghe		Independent	Parliamentary Secretary to the Minister of Defence and External Affairs			
P. B. A. Weerakoon		Sri Lanka Freedom Party	Parliamentary Secretary to the Minister of Education			
Senator Sarath Wijesinha			Parliamentary Secretary to the Minister of Finance	25 April 1956	10 September 1958	
