= Kotelawala cabinet =

Government of Ceylon from 1953 to 1956

- 3rd Cabinet of Ceylon

- Date formed: 12 October 1953
- Date dissolved: 12 April 1956

People and organisations
- Monarch: Elizabeth II
- Prime Minister: John Kotelawala
- Member parties: United National Party; All Ceylon Tamil Congress (1953)
- Status in legislature: Majority coalition (1953); Majority (1953–56)
- Opposition party: Sri Lanka Freedom Party
- Opposition leader: S. W. R. D. Bandaranaike

History
- Outgoing election: 1956
- Legislature term: 2nd
- Predecessor: Dudley Senanayake I
- Successor: S. W. R. D. Bandaranaike

The Kotelawala cabinet was the central government of Ceylon led by Prime Minister John Kotelawala between 1953 and 1956. It was formed in October 1953 after the resignation of Kotelawala's predecessor Dudley Senanayake and ended in April 1956 after the opposition's victory in the parliamentary election.

== Cabinet members ==
Name	Portrait	Party	Office	Took office	Left office	Refs
John Kotelawala		United National Party	Prime Minister	12 October 1953	12 April 1956	
John Kotelawala		United National Party	Minister of Defence and External Affairs	1953		
John Kotelawala		United National Party	Minister of Transport and Works	(Note: Continuation of same office held in previous cabinet.)	1954	
M. D. Banda			Minister of Education			
P. B. Bulankulame			Minister of Lands and Land Development			
Senator Oliver Goonetilleke			Minister of Finance	1953	1954	
J. R. Jayewardene		United National Party	Minister of Agriculture and Food	1953		
M. D. H. Jayawardena		United National Party	Minister of Finance	1 July 1954	18 February 1956	
Major Montague Jayawickrama			Minister of Transport and Works	1954		
M. C. M. Kaleel			Minister of Labour			
C. W. W. Kannangara			Minister of Local Government	1953		
S. Natesan		United National Party	Minister of Posts and Information		19 January 1956	
Major E. A. Nugawela			Minister of Health	1953		
G. G. Ponnambalam		All Ceylon Tamil Congress	Minister of Industries and Fisheries		22 October 1953	
Senator Lalita Rajapaksa			Minister of Justice		7 November 1953	
A. Ratnayake			Minister of Home Affairs	1953		
R. G. Senanayake			Minister of Commerce and Trade		10 July 1954	
Senator Kanthiah Vaithianathan			Minister of Housing and Social Services	1953	1953	
Senator Kanthiah Vaithianathan			Minister of Industries, Housing and Social Services	1953		
Senator E. B. Wikramanayake			Minister of Justice	1953		

== Parliamentary secretaries ==
Name	Portrait	Party	Office	Took office	Left office	Refs
Senator H. de Z. Siriwardena		United National Party	Parliamentary Secretary to the Minister of Home Affairs	19 October 1953		
M. D. H. Jayawardena		United National Party	Parliamentary Secretary to the Minister of Finance	19 October 1953	1 July 1954	
V. Kumaraswamy		All Ceylon Tamil Congress	Parliamentary Secretary			
V. Nalliah		United National Party	Parliamentary Secretary to the Minister of Defence and External Affairs	1953	1954	
U. B. Wanninayake		United National Party	Parliamentary Secretary to the Minister of Finance	1 July 1954		
C. E. Attygalle		United National Party	Parliamentary Secretary to the Minister of Health			
Shirley Corea		United National Party	Parliamentary Secretary to the Minister of Commerce, Trade and Fisheries			
Ivan Dassanayake		United National Party	Parliamentary Secretary to the Minister of Education			
Captain C. A. Dharmapala		United National Party	Parliamentary Secretary to the Minister of Industries, Housing and Social Services			
M. M. Ebrahim		United National Party	Parliamentary Secretary to the Minister of Local Government			
Major T. F. Jayewardene		United National Party	Parliamentary Secretary to the Minister of Labor			
Major Montague Jayawickrama		United National Party	Parliamentary Secretary to the Minister of Transport and Works	1953	1954	
Major Montague Jayawickrama		United National Party	Parliamentary Secretary to the Minister of Defence and External Affairs	1954	1956	
N. H. Keerthiratne		United National Party	Parliamentary Secretary to the Minister of Posts and Broadcasting			
T. B. Panabokke		United National Party	Parliamentary Secretary to the Minister of Agriculture and Food			
V. G. W. Ratnayake		United National Party	Parliamentary Secretary to the Minister of Lands and Land Development			
