= Minister for Internal Security (Ceylon) =

The Minister for Internal Security was a cabinet ministry of the Government of Ceylon that existed from January 1960 to March 1960 during the caretaker government of W. Dahanayake. Senator Layard Jayasundera served as Minister for Internal Security and Sydney de Zoysa served as Permanent Secretary. The Ministry had under it the Ceylon Police Force which at the time was tasked with internal security duties and had prior to January 1960, been under the Minister of Justice briefly after the Bandaranaike assassination. The police had traditionally been under the Ministry of External Affairs and Defence, which was a portfolio retained by the Prime Minister of Ceylon.

== See also ==
- Ministry of External Affairs and Defence
- Minister of Defence (Sri Lanka)
