= Wijewardene =

- Gender: Unisex
- Language: Sinhala

Other names
- Variant form: Wijewardena

Wijewardene or Wijewardena is a Sinhalese surname. Notable people with the surname include:

- Arthur Wijewardena (1887–1964), Ceylonese judge
- Clarence Wijewardena (1943–1996), Sri Lankan musician
- D. R. Wijewardena (1886–1950), Ceylonese businessman
- Ray Wijewardene (1924–2010), Ceylonese engineer and athlete
- Ruwan Wijewardene (born 1975), Sri Lankan politician
- Tyron Wijewardene (born 1961), Sri Lankan cricketer
- Upali Wijewardene (1938–1983), Sri Lankan businessman
- Vimala Wijewardene (1908–1985), Ceylonese politician
