= E. J. Cooray =

Ceylonese politician

Hon. Edmund J. Cooray CMG, OBE
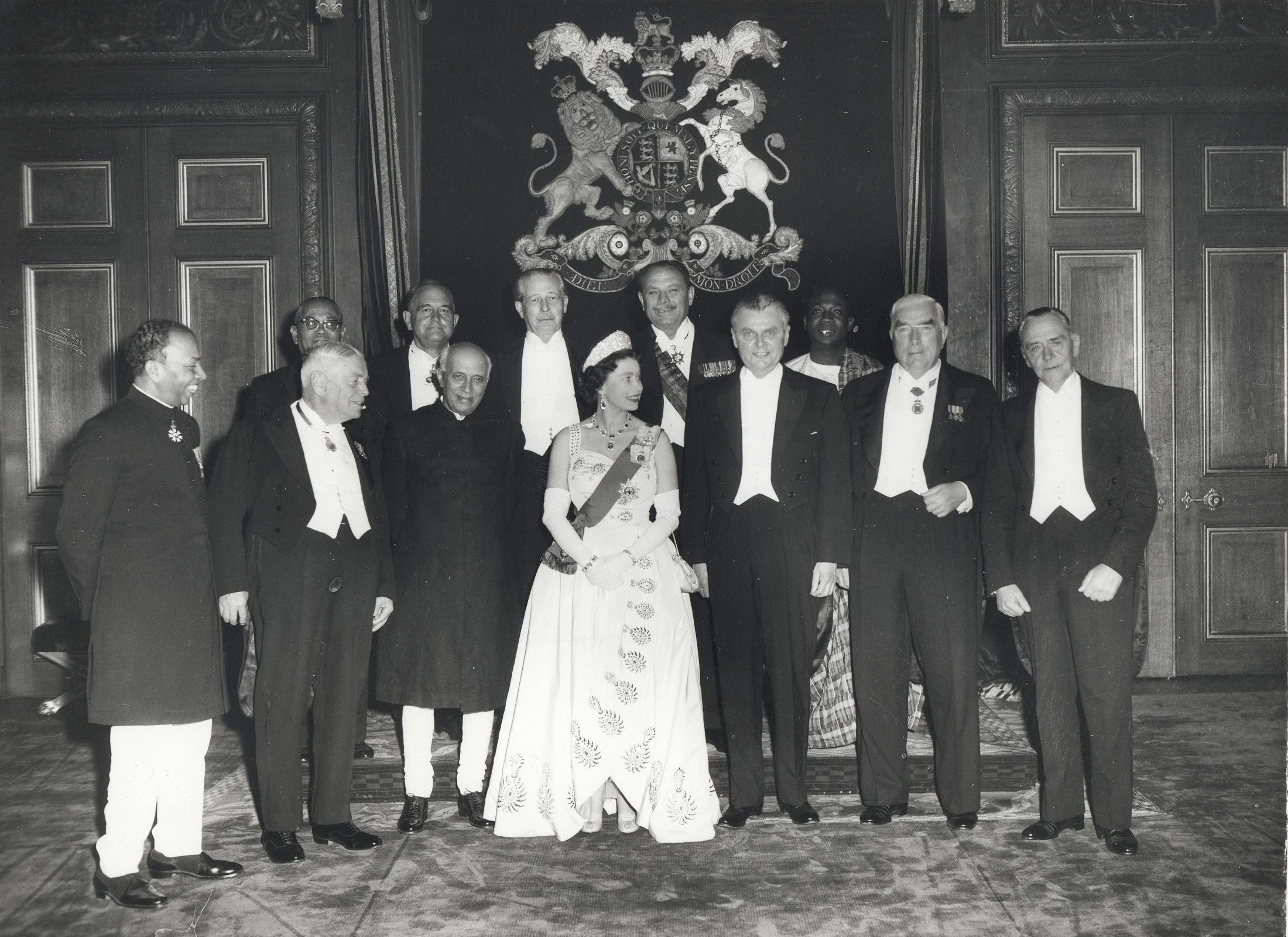
- Queen Elizabeth II and Commonwealth leaders including E. J. Cooray, taken at the 1960 Commonwealth Conference, Windsor Castle.

Minister of Justice
- In office 23 March 1960 – 21 July 1960
- Prime Minister: Dudley Senanayake
- Preceded by: Valentine S. Jayawickrema
- Succeeded by: Sam Peter Christopher Fernando

Personal details
- Born: November 16, 1907
- Died: November 6, 1979 (aged 71)
- Profession: Barrister

Edmund Joseph Cooray, CMG, OBE was a Ceylonese Senator and one-time Minister of Justice in the Second Dudley Senanayake cabinet. He attended the 1960 Commonwealth Prime Ministers' Conference in London on behalf of the Dominion of Ceylon.

He graduated with a BA from the University of London, qualified as a barrister and established his legal practice as an advocate. He was a lecturer for Digest and Voet at the Ceylon Law College. He served as the Commissioner of Co-operative Development and thereafter Chairman, Co-operative Wholesale Establishment. He was appointed an Officer of the Order of the British Empire (OBE) in the 1952 Birthday Honours and a Companion of the Order of St Michael and St George (CMG) in the 1955 Birthday Honours for his services to the co-operative movement.

Political offices
Preceded by Valentine S. Jayawickrema	Minister of Justice; 1960	Succeeded by Sam Peter Christopher Fernando
