= Muslim Central College =

Coordinates: 6°34′13.05″N 79°58′0.99″E

Muslim Central College or Kalutara Muslim Central College is a government (National school) located in Kalutara, Sri Lanka.

The school was established in 1918 when the 'Kur-Aan Madharasa' religious school was converted into a Tamil medium school, with 150 students. The first principal was Janab Marhoom M. M. Sultan. In 1928 the school was taken over by the government and the principal at that time was A. L. M. P. Mohemmed. Following the establishment of the Muslim Ladies College in 1956, the college was converted to an all boys’ school in 1957. In 1970 the school commenced lessons in Sinhalese and in 2002 began English classes. The college currently has over 2,000 students, and over 90 teachers. The school was converted to a National School in the year 2021 by the Department of Education.

== Notable alumni ==
| Name | Notability | Reference |
|---|---|---|
| Ali Sabry | Minister of Foreign Affairs (2022-Present), Minister of Finance (2022), Minister of Justice (2020–2022), Member of Parliament - National List (2020–present) | |
