= Edmund Peiris =

Gate Mudaliyar Edmund Peiris, JP, UM was a Ceylonese colonial-era headman and philanthropist. He was the Mudaliyar of Kalutara and was appointed as a Mudaliyar of the Governor's Gate.

His father was Mudaliyar Romanis Peiris, Customs Mudaliyar. Educated at St. John's College Panadura and Colombo Academy, he joined the public service as a clerk and served in the Colombo Kachcheri before being promoted to Muhandiram of Colombo Kachcheri in 1908 and was appointed as the youngest Mudaliyar of Pandadura and Kalutara Totamunes. He held the post for twenty five years retiring with the titular title of Mudaliyar, later to be given the titular title of Mudaliyar of the Governor's Gate. He was appointed a Justice of the Peace and an Unofficial magistrate.

He managed the Queen Victoria Diamond Jubilee Buddhist School, which his father built and donated it to the government. The Gate Mudliyar Edmond Peiris Prize is awarded by the Faculty of law of the University of Ceylon in his memory.

He married Somie, the eldest daughter of Mudaliyar C. F. S. Jayawickrama, Mudaliyar of the District Court of Kandy. Their children include Bernard Peiris, former Cabinet Secretary; Glanville Peiris, Ceylonese diplomat and S. W. Peiris, General Manager of Government Electrical Undertakings. His grandson is Prof G. L. Peiris, parliamentarian and government minister. He lived at Wasala Walauwa, Gorakapola, Panadura.
