= Minister of Justice (Sri Lanka) =

Minister of Justice and National Integration of Sri Lanka
- Incumbent; Harshana Nanayakkara since 18 November 2024
- Minister of Justice and National Integration
- Nominator: Prime Minister of Sri Lanka
- Appointer: President of Sri Lanka
- Formation: September 26, 1947; 78 years ago
- Website: www.moj.gov.lk

The minister justice, public administration, provincial councils, local government and labour is an appointment in the Cabinet of Sri Lanka.

The constitution defines that it is mandatory for a minister of the cabinet to be styled as the minister of justice. From 1947 to 1970, per section 48 of the constitution, the minister of justice was one of two ministers appointed from the Senate of Ceylon, as such appointments have been held by advocates. It succeeded the office of Legal Secretary of Ceylon which existed from 1932 to 1947.

== List of justice ministers ==
Parties

Sri Lanka Freedom Party United National Party Sri Lanka Muslim Congress Sri Lanka Podujana Peramuna National People's Power

Name	Portrait	Party	Tenure	Head(s) of government
Sir Lalita Rajapaksa, QC		United National Party	26 September 1947 – 1953	D. S. Senanayake; Dudley Senanayake
E. B. Wikramanayake, QC		United National Party	1953 – 1956	John Kotelawala
M. W. H. de Silva, QC		Sri Lanka Freedom Party	1956 – June 1959	S. W. R. D. Bandaranaike
Valentine S. Jayawickrema		Sri Lanka Freedom Party	June 1959 – 1960	S. W. R. D. Bandaranaike
Valentine S. Jayawickrema		Sri Lanka Freedom Party	June 1959 – 1960	Wijeyananda Dahanayake
E. J. Cooray		United National Party	23 March 1960 – 21 July 1960	Dudley Senanayake
Sam P. C. Fernando		Sri Lanka Freedom Party	23 July 1960 – March 1965	Sirimavo Bandaranaike
A. F. Wijemanne		United National Party	March 1965 – 1970	Dudley Senanayake
Felix Dias Bandaranaike		Sri Lanka Freedom Party	1970 – 1976	Sirimavo Bandaranaike
Ratnasiri Wickremanayake	Ratnasiri Wickremanayake	Sri Lanka Freedom Party	1976 – 1977	Sirimavo Bandaranaike
K. W. Devanayagam		United National Party	23 July 1977 – 14 February 1980	J. R. Jayewardene
Nissanka Wijeyeratne	Nissanka Wijeyeratne	United National Party	14 February 1980 – 1988	J. R. Jayewardene
Vincent Perera		United National Party	1989 – 1990	Ranasinghe Premadasa
Abdul Cader Shahul Hameed		United National Party	1990 – 1993	Ranasinghe Premadasa
Harold Herath		United National Party	1993 – 1994	Dingiri Banda Wijetunga
G. L. Peiris	G. L. Peiris	Sri Lanka Freedom Party	1994 – 2001	Chandrika Kumaratunga
W. J. M. Lokubandara	W. J. M. Lokubandara	United National Party	2001 – 2004	Chandrika Kumaratunga
John Seneviratne		Sri Lanka Freedom Party	2004 - 2006	Chandrika Kumaratunga
Amarasiri Dodangoda			2006 – 30 May 2009	Chandrika Kumaratunga
Amarasiri Dodangoda			2006 – 30 May 2009	Mahinda Rajapaksa
Milinda Moragoda		Sri Lanka Freedom Party	30 May 2009 – 23 April 2010	Mahinda Rajapaksa
Athauda Seneviratne		Sri Lanka Freedom Party	23 April 2010 – 22 November 2010	Mahinda Rajapaksa
Rauff Hakeem	Rauff Hakeem	Sri Lanka Muslim Congress	22 November 2010 – 28 December 2014	Mahinda Rajapaksa
Wijeyadasa Rajapakshe, PC	Wijeyadasa Rajapakshe	United National Party	12 January 2015 - 23 August 2017	Maithripala Sirisena
Thalatha Atukorale	Thalatha Atukorale	United National Party	25 August 2017 - 22 November 2019	Maithripala Sirisena
Nimal Siripala de Silva	Nimal Siripala de Silva	Sri Lanka Freedom Party	22 November 2019 - 12 August 2020	Gotabaya Rajapaksa; Ranil Wickremesinghe
Ali Sabry, PC		Sri Lanka Podujana Peramuna	12 August 2020 - 3 April 2022	Gotabaya Rajapaksa
Office Vacant			3 April 2022 - 26 April 2022	Gotabaya Rajapaksa
Ali Sabry, PC		Sri Lanka Podujana Peramuna	26 April 2022 - 9 May 2022	Gotabaya Rajapaksa
Wijeyadasa Rajapakshe, PC	Wijeyadasa Rajapakshe	Independent	20 May 2022 - 29 July 2024	Gotabaya Rajapaksa, Ranil Wickremesinghe
Ali Sabry, PC		Sri Lanka Podujana Peramuna	12 August 2024 - 23 September 2024	Ranil Wickremesinghe
Harini Amarasuriya		National People's Power	24 September 2024 – 18 November 2024	Anura Kumara Dissanayake
Harshana Nanayakkara		National People's Power	18 November 2024 – Present	Anura Kumara Dissanayake

== See also ==
- Ministry of Justice, Prisons Affairs and Constitutional Reforms
