= Dahanayake cabinet =

Dahanayake Cabinet
- 5th Cabinet of Ceylon
- Date formed: 26 September 1959
- Date dissolved: 20 March 1960

People and organisations
- Monarch: Elizabeth II
- Prime Minister: Wijeyananda Dahanayake
- Member party: Sri Lanka Freedom Party; Sinhala Language Front; Independents
- Status in legislature: Minority government
- Opposition party: Lanka Sama Samaja Party
- Opposition leader: N. M. Perera

History
- Outgoing election: March 1960
- Legislature term: 3rd
- Predecessor: S. W. R. D. Bandaranaike
- Successor: Dudley Senanayake II

The Dahanayake Cabinet was the central government of Ceylon led by Prime Minister Wijeyananda Dahanayake from 1959 to 1960. It was formed in September 1959 after the assassination of Dahanayake's predecessor S. W. R. D. Bandaranaike and ended in March 1960 after the opposition's victory in the parliamentary election.

== Cabinet members ==
Name	Portrait	Party	Office	Took office	Left office	Refs
Wijeyananda Dahanayake		Sinhala Language Front	Prime Minister	26 September 1959	20 March 1960	
Wijeyananda Dahanayake		Sinhala Language Front	Minister of Defence and External Affairs	26 September 1959	20 March 1960	
Henry Abeywickrema		Sri Lanka Freedom Party	Minister of Works	26 September 1959	20 March 1960	
C. P. de Silva		Sri Lanka Freedom Party	Minister of Agriculture and Lands	(Note: Continuation of same office held in previous cabinet.)	December 1959	
M. P. de Zoysa		Sri Lanka Freedom Party	Minister of Labour	26 September 1959	8 December 1959	
Stanley de Zoysa		Sri Lanka Freedom Party	Minister of Finance		22 November 1959	
T. B. Ilangaratne		Sri Lanka Freedom Party	Minister of Home Affairs	26 September 1959	8 December 1959	
Senator A. P. Jayasuriya			Minister of Health	26 September 1959	8 December 1959	
Senator Layard Jayasundera			Minister for Internal Security	20 January 1960	20 March 1960	
Senator Layard Jayasundera			Minister of Local Government and Housing	26 September 1959	31 December 1959	
Senator Valentine S. Jayawickrema			Minister of Justice			
P. B. G. Kalugalla		Sri Lanka Freedom Party	Minister of Cultural Affairs and Social Services		8 December 1959	
C. A. S. Marikar	C.A.S Marikar	Sri Lanka Freedom Party	Minister of Posts, Broadcasting and Information			
M. B. W. Mediwake		Sri Lanka Freedom Party	Minister of Local Government and Housing			
W. J. C. Munasinha		Sri Lanka Freedom Party	Minister of Industries and Fisheries			
M. M. Mustapha			Minister of Finance	22 November 1959	5 December 1959	
Maithripala Senanayake		Sri Lanka Freedom Party	Minister of Transport and Power		8 December 1959	
Robert Edward Jayatilaka		Independent	Minister of Transport and Works	9 December 1959	20 March 1960	
R. G. Senanayake		Independent	Minister of Food, Commerce and Trade			
Vimala Wijewardene		Sri Lanka Freedom Party	Minister of Local Government and Housing		21 November 1959	

== Parliamentary secretaries ==
Name	Portrait	Party	Office	Took office	Left office	Refs
M. M. Mustapha			Parliamentary Secretary to the Minister of Finance		5 December 1959	
D. S. Goonesekera			Parliamentary Secretary to the Minister of Trade & Commerce		5 December 1959	
W. P. G. Ariyadasa			Parliamentary Secretary to the Minister of Health		5 December 1959	
