= Bernard Peiris =

Bernard Percival Peiris, OBE, JP (29 March 1908 – 18 January 1977) was a Sri Lankan lawyer. He was the former Cabinet Secretary and the Legal Draftsmen who drafted the Ceylon Order in Council, the first constitution of independent Ceylon.

== Family ==
Born to a wealthy family in Panadura, his father was Gate Mudaliar Edmund Peiris and mother Somie Jayawickrama, daughter of Mudaliar C. F. S. Jayawickrama. He had three brothers and two sisters, of whom were S. W. Peiris an engineer who became General Manager of Government Electrical Undertakings and Glanville Peiris a diplomat who became Director-General External Affairs and was the former Ceylon's Ambassador to West Germany and Myanmar.

He was married to Adeline, daughter of K.C.j. de Silva of Galle and had a daughter Kamala who married Dr Cecil Dharamarajah Chelliah. His nephew is Prof G. L. Peiris former Sri Lankan Cabinet Minister of External Affairs.

== Education ==
Educated at the Royal College, Colombo where he won the George Wille Prize for Greek prose, came second in Latin prose and was made a prefect. He entered the University College, Colombo before leaving for England. Entering University College, London and Lincoln's Inn, he pursued his legal studies. He graduated from the University of London with an LL.B. degree and was called to bar at the Lincoln's Inn on return of Ceylon he became an Advocate and began his practice in the unofficial bar.

== Public service ==
In 1936 he joined public service as an Assistant Legal Draftsmen in the Legal Draftsmen's Department, when Mervyn Fonseka was head of the department. In 1946 based on the finding of Soulbury Commission and advice of Sir Ivor Jennings, D. S. Senanayake Vice President of the Board of Ministers asked Peiris then Second Assistant Legal Draftsmen to draft constitution to be-used for Ceylon's Independence. For this purpose he was seconded to the Attorney-General's department. The Ceylon Order in Council along with relevant supportive legislation were drafted by Peiris by 1946 and reviewed by Sir Robart Drayton, Chief Secretary and J.H.B. Nihill, Legal Secretary. The draft was approved by Senanayake and Jennings, after which it was sent to the Colonial Office in London, who added only a single line to protect British share holders in the island. In late 1946 he tuning down an invitation to become Attorney-General of Seychelles, which was filled by James Homer-Vanniasinkam of the same department.

In 1947 he was appointed to the post of Assistant Secretary to the Cabinet by D. S. Senanayake with the formation of Cabinet Government in Ceylon with its first Cabinet. He was promoted to Cabinet Secretary in October 1954 and later elevated to the pay-rate of a Permanent Secretary. He served under six prime ministers until he retired in 1963. For his public service he was awarded made Member (MBE) in the Order of the British Empire in the 1947 Birthday Honours and an Officer (OBE) in the 1954 New Year Honours.

He died on 18 January 1977.
