= Ali Sabry (Sri Lankan politician) =

Sri Lankan politician and lawyer

Hon. Ali Sabry PC MP
- අලි සබ්රි அலி சப்ரி
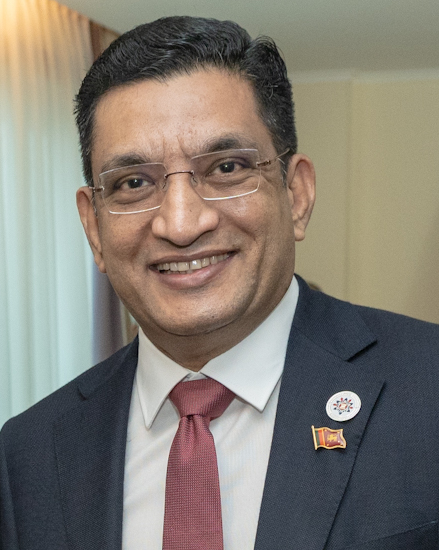
- Sabry in 2022

Minister of Foreign Affairs
- In office 22 July 2022 – 23 September 2024
- President: Ranil Wickremasinghe
- Prime Minister: Dinesh Gunawardena
- Preceded by: G. L. Peiris
- Succeeded by: Vijitha Herath

Minister of Justice
- In office 12 August 2024 – 23 September 2024
- President: Ranil Wickremasinghe
- Prime Minister: Dinesh Gunawardena
- Preceded by: Wijeyadasa Rajapakshe
- Succeeded by: Harini Amarasuriya
- In office 26 April 2022 – 9 May 2022
- President: Gotabaya Rajapaksa
- Prime Minister: Mahinda Rajapaksa
- Preceded by: Himself
- Succeeded by: Wijeyadasa Rajapakshe
- In office 12 August 2020 – 3 April 2022
- President: Gotabaya Rajapaksa
- Prime Minister: Mahinda Rajapaksa
- Preceded by: Nimal Siripala de Silva

Minister of Finance
- In office 5 April 2022 – 9 May 2022
- President: Gotabaya Rajapaksa
- Prime Minister: Mahinda Rajapaksa
- Preceded by: Basil Rajapaksa
- Succeeded by: Ranil Wickramasinghe

State Minister of Prison Management and Prisoners’ Rehabilitation
- In office 26 April 2022 – 9 May 2022
- President: Gotabaya Rajapaksa
- Prime Minister: Mahinda Rajapaksa
- Preceded by: Lohan Ratwatte
- Succeeded by: Vacant

Consul General of Sri Lanka in Saudi Arabia
- In office 1997–1999
- President: Chandrika Kumaratunga
- Prime Minister: Sirimavo Bandaranaike
- Minister: Lakshman Kadirgamar as Minister of Foreign Affairs

President's Counsel
- Incumbent
- Assumed office 2012

Member of Parliament for National List
- In office 12 August 2020 – 24 September 2024

Personal details
- Born: 1 May 1970 (age 56) Kalutara, Sri Lanka
- Party: Sri Lanka Podujana Peramuna
- Spouse: Sarah Sabry
- Children: 3
- Education: Zahira College, Colombo, Kalutara Muslim Central College
- Occupation: Politician, Lawyer

Mohamed Uvais Mohamed Ali Sabry, PC, MP (Sinhala: මොහොමඩ් උවයිස් මොහොමඩ් අලි සබ්රි, Tamil: மோஹமட் உவைஸ் மோஹமட் அலி சப்ரி; born 1 May 1970), commonly known as Ali Sabry, is a Sri Lankan lawyer and politician. He was the Minister of Foreign Affairs from 22 July 2022 to 23 September 2024. He previously served as the Minister of Finance until 9 May 2022. He was a Member of Parliament, appointed from the national list of the Sri Lanka Podujana Peramuna. He also served as the Minister of Justice until 9 May 2022. He served as the defense counsel of President Gotabaya Rajapaksa, chief legal adviser and President of the Muslim Federation of the Sri Lanka Podujana Peramuna.

Beginning 4 April 2022, Sabry was appointed as the new Minister of Finance, replacing Basil Rajapaksa (brother of President Gotabaya Rajapaksa) in the position. Due to the worsening of the financial crisis, Sabry tendered his resignation 5 April 2022, having served only a day in office. However, Sabry revoked his resignation and resumed office as the Minister of Finance of Sri Lanka. After the resignation of Prime Minister Mahinda Rajapaksa, the cabinet was dissolved on 9 May 2022.

== Early life and education ==
Born in Kalutara to M.S.M Uvais and Zareena Uvais, Sabry was educated at Kalutara Muslim Central College and Zahira College, Colombo. He entered Sri Lanka Law College where he was a notable student leader and was elected General Secretary of the Law Students’ Union, elected President of the SLFP Law Students’ Union and also led the Law College Sinhala debating team. He was admitted to the Sri Lankan bar as an Attorney-at- Law in 1995.

== Family ==
Ali Sabry is married to Sarah Sabry and they have three children, namely Bilal Sabry, Talal Sabry and Jamal Sabry. Bilal Sabry is a graduate from the prestigious University of California, Berkeley.

== Legal career ==
Having qualified as an attorney at law, Sabry joined the Unofficial Bar and developed a lucrative practice in original and appellate courts specializing in civil law. He served as Sri Lankan Consul General in Jeddah, Saudi Arabia and represented Sri Lanka in many International conferences including the Human Rights Session in the United Nations Human Rights Council in March 2012. He was the treasurer of the Bar Association of Sri Lanka and Chairman of the Junior Bar Committee of the Bar Association of Sri Lanka. In 2012 he was appointed a President's Counsel. At the time of his appointment he was the youngest ever President's Counsel.

In 2019 Sabry defended the then defense secretary Gotabaya Rajapaksa when the latter was accused of holding US citizenship in the runup to the 2019 Sri Lankan presidential election, and insisted that Gotabaya wasn't a US citizen, presenting evidence.

In 2020 he appeared in court cases for Rajapaksa, who was accused of corruption during the Presidency of Mahinda Rajapaksa.

== Political career ==
He campaigned for Gotabaya Rajapakse during the 2019 Sri Lankan presidential election and urged the Muslim community to vote for him to form a stable government following the pressure on the community aftermath the 2019 Easter attacks.

He entered the mainstream politics in 2020 and became a member of SLPP. In July 2020, he was appointed as the national leader of the SLPP party's Muslim Federation by the President.

He did not contest at the 2020 Sri Lankan parliamentary election but was named by SLPP as a national list candidate to enter the parliament. On 12 August 2020, he was appointed as the Justice minister by the President Gotabaya Rajapaksa in his cabinet during the swearing-in ceremony and was the only Muslim person in the 25 member cabinet of ministers for the 16th Parliament of Sri Lanka. He was the first President's Counsel to serve as Minister of Justice after M. W. H. de Silva, QC.

On 4 April 2022, he was part of the temporary four member cabinet which was formed following the resignation of 26 cabinet ministers from their ministerial portfolios in wake of the economic crisis and protests. He was also one of the 26 ministers to resign but was given a new ministry by the President soon afterwards so he was part of the temporary cabinet. The following day, on 5 April 2022 he quit the temporary cabinet by resigning from the finance ministry which was handed over to him in the new temporary cabinet. But, later on 8 April 2022, he informed the House that he would continue as the Finance Minister because the President did not accept his resignation and served until his government was dissolved on 9 May 2022. He was appointed the Minister of Foreign Affairs replacing G. L. Peiris on 22 July 2022.

=== Controversy ===
His appointment as a Justice minister was controversial. He also faced criticisms and backlash for his remarks on the government's decision and Ministry of Health, Nutrition and Indigenous Medicine's decision for prohibition of burials and a proper cremation process of the Muslims who died due to the COVID-19 pandemic in Sri Lanka.
