= C. Nagalingam =

Sri Lankan judge

C. Nagalingam KC

Acting Governor-General of Ceylon
- In office 1954–1954
- Monarch: Elizabeth II
- Prime Minister: John Kotelawala
- Preceded by: Lord Soulbury
- Succeeded by: Lord Soulbury

Acting Chief Justice of Ceylon
- In office 1954–1954
- Preceded by: Alan Rose
- Succeeded by: Hema Henry Basnayake

Puisne Justice of the Supreme Court of Ceylon
- In office 1947–1958

27th Attorney General of Ceylon
- In office 25 January 1946 – 1947
- Governor: Sir Henry Monck-Mason Moore
- Preceded by: Manikku Wadumestri Hendrick de Silva
- Succeeded by: Edward Percival Rose

Personal details
- Born: 25 October 1893
- Died: 25 October 1958 (aged 65)
- Spouse: Gnanam
- Relations: C. Amirthalingam; C. Panchalingam; C. Suntharalingam; C. Thiagalingam
- Education: Ceylon Law College; Royal College, Colombo; St. John's College, Jaffna
- Profession: Judge, lawyer
- Ethnicity: Ceylon Tamil

Chellappah Nagalingam, KC (25 October 1893 – 25 October 1958) was a leading Ceylonese judge and lawyer. He was a Judge of the Supreme Court of Ceylon and served as acting Governor-General of Ceylon in 1954. He also served as acting Chief Justice, acting Legal Secretary and Attorney General. He was the first Ceylon Tamil to be appointed to the bench of the Supreme Court of Ceylon. He is considered to be the leading founder of Hindu College Colombo.

== Early life and education ==
Nagalingam was born on 25 October 1893. He was the son of Chellappah and Meenachchi from Urumpirai in Northern Province of Ceylon. He hailed from a distinguished family and had four eminent brothers: C. Suntharalingam, a member of parliament and government minister; C. Panchalingam, a medical doctor; C. Amirthalingam, Director of Fisheries; and C. Thiagalingam, a leading lawyer. Nagalingam was educated at St. John's College, Jaffna and Royal College, Colombo where he excelled in studies and sports and won the De Soysa Science Prize. Thereafter he entered Ceylon Law College, qualifying as an advocate in 1917.

== Legal career ==
After Nagalingam was called to the bar, he practised law in Colombo until 1937. In 1938 he was appointed an Additional District Judge of Colombo. He was appointed District Judge of Kandy in 1941 and acting Attorney General in 1946. He was also appointed King's Counsel in 1946. In 1947 he became acting Legal Secretary, one of the three official members of the State Council, heading committee of justice with ministerial rank in the Board of Ministers. He was also called to the bench as an acting puisne justice and was confirmed justice of the Supreme Court in 1947, the first Tamil to hold that post. He was later appointed Senior Supreme Court Judge and acted as Chief Justice on a number of occasions. In this capacity he was called upon to briefly serve as acting Governor-General in 1954 whilst Lord Soulbury was out of the country.

Nagalingam was chairman of the Civil Courts Commission and the Salaries Commission, and member of the Council of Legal Education and the Judicial Service Commission.

Nagalingam was one of the founders of the Hindu Educational Society, which founded Hindu College Colombo in 1951.

== Family ==
Nagalingam married Gnanam, daughter of Vaithilingam. They had two sons (Yogalingam and Bakthilingam) and four daughters (Maheswari, Sarveswari, Vigneswari and Nandeswari). Nagalingam died on 25 October 1958.

Government offices
Preceded by Lord Soulbury	Acting; Governor-General of Ceylon; 1954	Succeeded by Lord Soulbury
Legal offices
Preceded by Alan Rose	Acting; Chief Justice of Ceylon; 1954	Succeeded by Hema Henry Basnayake
Preceded by Manikku Wadumestri Hendrick de Silva	Attorney General of Ceylon; 1946–1947	Succeeded by Edward Percival Rose
