= Layard Jayasundera =

Ceylonese politician

Senator Layard Jayasundera as a Ceylonese politician. He was the Minister of Local Government and Housing and the Minister for Internal Security in the cabinet of W. Dahanayake and a member of the Senate of Ceylon.

A tea planter by profession, he was appointed an unofficial member of the Colombo Port Commission in 1956. He succeeded Vimala Wijewardene as Minister of Local Government and Housing and having been appointed to the Senate. In January 1960 he was appointed Minister for Internal Security. The Ceylon Police Force was placed under the Minister and Sydney de Zoysa served as Permanent Secretary.
