= Alan Rose =

Chief Justice of Ceylon from 1951 to 1956

Sir Alan Rose

28th Attorney General of Ceylon
- In office 23 October 1947 – 1951
- Governors General: Andrew Caldecott; Henry Monck-Mason Moore
- Preceded by: Chellappah Nagalingam
- Succeeded by: Hema Henry Basnayake

3rd Chief Justice of the Colony of Singapore
- In office 1958–1959
- Appointed by: William Allmond Codrington Goode
- Preceded by: John Whyatt
- Succeeded by: Position abolished

1st Chief Justice of the State of Singapore
- In office 1959–1963
- Appointed by: William Allmond Codrington Goode
- Preceded by: Position established
- Succeeded by: Wee Chong Jin

30th Chief Justice of Ceylon
- In office 1952–1956
- Appointed by: Henry Monck-Mason Moore
- Preceded by: Edward Jayetileke
- Succeeded by: Hema Henry Basnayake; Chellappah Nagalingam (Acting)

Personal details
- Born: 8 October 1899 London, England
- Died: 20 June 1975 (aged 75) Brighton, Sussex
- Education: Trinity College, Cambridge

Sir Alan Edward Percival Rose, KCMG, QC (8 October 1899 – 20 June 1975) was a British barrister and colonial judge.

== Early life and education ==
Rose was born in London, the son of author Charles Edward Rose. He was educated at Aldenham School and Trinity College, Cambridge. He served in the 1st Battalion Rifle Brigade of the British Army in World War I. He was called to the bar in 1923.

== Career ==
Rose served in the Colonial Legal Service from 1929 to 1942 in Fiji, Rhodesia and Palestine. After serving as Solicitor General of British Palestine, Rose became Commissioner in charge of investigating corruption in the Customs Department in 1942 before serving in Ceylon until 1955. He was appointed to the Supreme Court of Ceylon in 1945, served as Legal Secretary in 1946–47 and Attorney General of Ceylon from 1947 to 1951, before being appointed the 30th Chief Justice of Ceylon. He was appointed in 1952 succeeding Edward Jayetileke and was Chief Justice until 1956. He was succeeded by Hema Henry Basnayake.

He initially retired following his appointment in Ceylon, but stayed active. In 1956, he chaired the Commission of Enquiry into the affairs of Nairobi City Council. In 1958, on the strength of his service in Ceylon, he was chosen as Chief Justice of Singapore and served during the period of time in which the colony achieved self governance.

Rose was knighted in 1950 and created a Knight Commander of the Order of St Michael and St George in 1955. He finally retired in 1963.

Rose returned to England and died in Brighton in 1975.

Legal offices
Preceded by John Whyatt	Chief Justice of Singapore; 1958–1963	Succeeded by Wee Chong Jin
Preceded by Edward Jayetileke	Chief Justice of Ceylon; 1952–1956	Succeeded by Hema Henry Basnayake; Chellappah Nagalingam as acting
