= Sydney de Zoysa =

Sri Lankan police officer (1909–1994)

- Born: January 15, 1909; Ceylon
- Died: October 20, 1994 (aged 85); Sri Lanka
- Police career
- Allegiance: Ceylon
- Department: Ceylon Police Force
- Service years: 1937 – 1960
- Rank: Deputy Inspector-General of Police
- Awards: Ceylon Police Medal for Meritorious Service
- Other work: Permanent Secretary to the Ministry of Internal Security

Sydney Godfrey de Zoysa (January 15, 1909 – October 20, 1994) was a Sri Lankan senior police officer. A former Deputy Inspector General of Police (DIG) of Range II and Permanent Secretary to the Ministry of Internal Security, he was one of the co-conspirators of the attempted military coup of 1962.

== Early life and education ==
Born to Sir Francis de Zoysa, KC an advocate and member of the first State Council and Lady Ethel Perera Amarasekera Siriwardena, his brothers were Stanly de Zoysa, former Cabinet Minister of Finance and a Member of Parliament and A. C. "Bunty" de Zoysa, a prominent criminal lawyer. His uncle was Sir Ernest de Silva. He was educated at Royal College, Colombo and at Ceylon University College where he read economics and was an active sportsman.

== Police career ==
In December 1931, he was appointed by the Governor as a Police Probationer Assistant Superintendent of Police in the Ceylon Police Force. Completing his service examinations, he was appointed Assistant Superintendent of Police, Colombo District (South) in December 1933 and there after of Colombo District (North) in August 1934. In May 1936, he attended the Senior Police Officers course at the Metropolitan Police. On his return, he was appointed Assistant Superintendent of Police, Tangalle in September 1936; Avissawella in July 1938; November 1940, Sabaragamuwa; and March 1941, Northern Province. From 1942 to 1944, he was interdicted from service. In August 1944, he was appointed Assistant Superintendent of Police, Colombo Division (North); October 1944, Colombo Division; December 1944, Police Headquarters. In 1945, he was appointed Acting Director of the Police Training School and re-established it at Katukurunda, Kalutara in 1948. He was confirmed in March 1947 as the first Director of Training with the grade of Superintendent of Police which he served until 1955. During this time he served as Superintendent of Police, Western Province (South) in addition to his duties. During the Gal Oya riots, de Zoysa who had been promoted to Deputy Inspector-General of Police of Range II, personally went to Gal Oya valley and threatened local politicians with arrest if they incited the mob to violence, even if they were Cabinet Ministers, thus bringing the situation under control.

During his service he received the Ceylon Police Medal for Meritorious Service, Defence Medal 1939-45, Ceylon Police Independence Medal and the Service Medal of the Order of St John.

== Bandaranaike assassination ==
In 1959, while he was serving as Deputy Inspector-General of Police of Range II, at a May Day rally, Minister Philip Gunawardena claimed that DIG Sydney de Zoysa was conspiring against the government along with his brother, the Finance Minister Stanley de Zoysa and called for their removal. Few days later on 18 May, Gunawardena and two other minister resigned from the government. De Zoysa sued Gunawardena on charges of criminal defamation, yet the court ruled in Gunawardena's favor.

On September 26, 1959, Bandaranaike was shot by an assassin at his home in Colombo. Shortly after the shooting, De Zoysa arrived at the crime scene and ordered that the wounded assassin who was in police custody to be taken to the Harbor Police Station. This action together with underlying suspicions following his brother F.R. de Zoysa was arrested and remanded under suspicion of the assassination along with former minister Vimala Wijewardene on November 19, 1959, forced the government to send him on compulsory leave. Other government ministers forced Stanley de Zoysa, the Minister of Finance to resign on November 22, 1959. F.R. de Zoysa was later released after no evidence was found against him. On November 26, the government members of the parliament called for the immediate retirement of DIG de Zoysa as a condition to vote against a no-confidence votebrought by the opposition in the parliament. The government conceded and DIG de Zoysa was informed by the Public Service Commission on November 27, 1959 that he was to retire from the police service in March 1960.

== Ministry of Internal Security ==
In January 1960, he was appointed Permanent Secretary to the Ministry of Internal Security when Senator Layard Jayasundera was appointed Minister of Internal Security by Prime Minister Wijeyananda Dahanayake. He functioned in that capacity until March 1960 when Dahanayake was defeated in the general election and the ministry was dissolved.

== Attempted military coup ==
As a member of the Christian elite, who were being deprived of the influence they once had due to the Sinhalisation process started by Prime Minister S.W.R.D. Bandaranaike and carried on by his widow Sirima Bandaranaike, several disgruntled Christian officers of the army, navy and the police began to plot a coup similar to that of General Ayub Khan. de Zoysa was a co-conspirator of it and has been claimed to be the architect of it. Arrested in January 1962, he was charged as one of the twenty four conspirators of the coup in June 1962 and was one of the eleven convicted on June 3, 1963. Upon appealing to the Judicial Committee of the Privy Council, the conviction was overturned on December 21, 1965 and he was acquitted.

== Family ==
He married Dr. Corrine Jackson. He had two sons; Subodai and Shivaji, and two daughters; Sydra and Sydol.

== See also ==
- List of Sri Lankan non-career Permanent Secretaries
