= John Curtois Howard =

Chief Justice of Ceylon from 1939 to 1949

Sir John Howard KC

27th Chief Justice of Ceylon
- In office 1 December 1939 – 1949
- Appointed by: Andrew Caldecott
- Preceded by: Sidney Abrahams; Francis Soertsz as acting
- Succeeded by: Arthur Wijewardena; Francis Soertsz as acting

24th Attorney General of Ceylon
- In office 27 July 1936 – 1936
- Governor: Edward Stubbs
- Preceded by: Edward St. John Jackson
- Succeeded by: John William Ronald Illangakoon

Attorney General of Cyprus
- In office 1925–1926
- Succeeded by: Charles Cyril Howard

Personal details
- Born: John Curtois Howard; 15 January 1887 Spalding, Lincolnshire, England
- Died: 19 November 1970 (aged 83) Eastbourne, Sussex, England
- Children: 4

Sir John Curtois Howard KC (15 January 1887 – 19 November 1970) was an English magistrate who was the 27th Chief Justice of Ceylon. He was appointed in 1939 succeeding the acting Francis Soertsz and was Chief Justice until 1949. He was succeeded by Arthur Wijewardena, also after the acting Francis Soertsz.

Howard was born in Spalding, Lincolnshire, to FitzAlan Howard and Edith Thacker. He was educated at Uppingham School and Clare College, Cambridge. He was called to the bar a year before the First World War, and his career was interrupted by six years in the British Army.

After the war, he accepted a job in the Colonial Legal Service, serving as Attorney General of Cyprus, Solicitor-General of Nigeria and Attorney-General of the Gold Coast (now Ghana). In 1936, he was promoted to Legal Secretary, Ceylon. After returning to England, from 1953 to 1957, he was chairman of the Police Council for Great Britain. He was recalled by Sir William Fitzgerald as "a strikingly handsome man with a commanding presence."

Howard was knighted in the 1942 New Year Honours.

Legal offices
Preceded by Sidney Abrahams; Francis Soertsz as acting	Chief Justice of Ceylon; 1939-1945	Succeeded by Arthur Wijewardena; Francis Soertsz as acting
Preceded by Edward St. John Jackson	Attorney General of Ceylon; 1936	Succeeded by John William Ronald Illangakoon
Preceded by	Attorney General of Cyprus; 1925-1926	Succeeded by Charles Cyril Howard
