= Arthur Wijewardena =

Chief Justice of Ceylon from 1949 to 1950

Sir Arthur Wijewardene KC

Acting Governor-General of Ceylon
- In office 1953
- Monarch: Elizabeth II
- Prime Minister: John Kotelawala
- Preceded by: Lord Soulbury
- Succeeded by: Lord Soulbury

28th Chief Justice of Ceylon
- In office January 1949 – 1950
- Appointed by: Henry Monck-Mason Moore
- Preceded by: John Curtois Howard; Francis Soertsz as acting
- Succeeded by: Edward Jayetileke

12th Solicitor General of Ceylon
- In office 1936–1938
- Appointed by: Reginald E. Stubbs
- Preceded by: J. W. R. Illangakoon
- Succeeded by: Edward Jayetileke

Personal details
- Born: 21 March 1887 British Ceylon
- Died: 1964
- Parent(s): D.S.L. Wijewardene and Maria Catherine Perera
- Education: Cambridge University

Sir Edwin Arthur Lewis Wijewardena, KC (21 March 1887 – 1964) was the 28th Chief Justice of Ceylon.

Educated at Ananda College, Colombo and S. Thomas' College, Mount Lavinia, Wijewardena graduated from University of Cambridge and qualified as a barrister. On his return to Ceylon he became an advocate. He took the entrance exam for the Ceylon Civil Service and passed, but was not admitted to failing the medical exam. He served as the solicitor general of Ceylon from 1936 to 1938 and was appointed King's Counsel. Appointed to the Supreme Court, Wijewardena was appointed Chief Justice in 1949 succeeding the acting Francis Soertsz and was Chief Justice until 1950. He was succeeded by Edward Jayetileke. He was knighted as a Knight Bachelor in the 1949 Birthday Honours.

Government offices
| Preceded by Lord Soulbury | Acting; Governor-General of Ceylon; 195? | Succeeded by Lord Soulbury |
Legal offices
| Preceded by John Curtois Howard; Francis Soertsz as acting | Chief Justice of Ceylon; 1949-1950 | Succeeded by Edward Jayetileke |
| Preceded by J. W. R. Illangakoon | Solicitor General of Ceylon; 1936-1938 | Succeeded by Edward Jayetileke |
