= Zahira College, Matale =

Zahira College (National School) Matale

Location
- Tharalanda Road; Matale, Central Province; Sri Lanka
- Coordinates: 7°28′37″N 80°37′36″E

Information
- Type: Public School
- Motto: Live in Light
- Established: 3 August 1942; 83 years ago
- School district: Matale District
- Principal: L. M. Abdul Azeez
- Grades: 1 - 13
- Gender: Male (Boys)
- Enrollment: 2,000
- Houses: Azad, Iqbal, Jayah, Jinnah
- Colours: Green and gold
- Alumni: Zahirians
- Website: zahiracollegematale.com (Maintained by the O.B.U/ Old Boys’ Union of the college)

Zahira College (National School) Matale, (Arabic: Zahira means "Excellence"; Tamil: சாஹிரா தேசிய கல்லூரி; Sinhala: සහිරා ජාතික පාසල), is one of the oldest schools in the Matale District. It is situated in the centre of the city.

== History ==
The school was founded on 3 August 1942 by Tuan Burhanuddin Jayah. The original 4.5 ha (11 acres) school site was donated by Vithanage Tergin Nanayakkara, the local member for Matale. The first buildings were funded by a donation from a local Muslim philanthropist, Cassim Had Sar.

The school is noted for its accomplishments in the field of hockey, winning a number of national schoolboy championships. Hockey was first introduced to the school by a local businessman, George Mant, who learnt the sport at St. Thomas' College, Mount Lavinia. Mant with a number of other enthusiasts established the Matale Hockey Association in September 1942. The school has produced a number of national players, including S. I. Ajward, M. Ayub, M. Zarook, and A. J. M. Farook.

== Houses ==
The houses compete to win the inter-house games held by the college annually.

House	Color
Azad	
Iqbal	
Jayah	
Jinnah	

== Past Principals ==
Principal	Arrived	Departed
T. S. Sally	03-08-1942	29-06-1943
A. R. M. Nilam	30-06-1943	12-01-1945
S. Rauf Pasha	08-02-1945	13-01-1946
A. V. Ponnusaami	09-02-1946	30-03-1946
Anif Doray	01-04-1946	30-04-1946
M. V. Mathai	28-08-1947	27-08-1961
S. H. A Wadood	28-08-1961	31-05-1965
A. Z. Omerdeen	01-06-1965	15-02-1968
A. C. M. Zeirideen	16-02-1968	07-12-1970
S. H. A. Wadood	07-12-1970	27-04-1976
A. M. Rakeem	28-04-1976	22-11-1977
A. A. M. Fuaji	23-11-1977	30-11-1979
A. C. M. Zeirideen	01-12-1979	01-03-1985
A. A. M. Fuaji	01-03-1985	31-12-1990
T. Uzair	01-01-1991	24-09-1994
A. J. M. Farook	24-09-1994	19-04-1996
M. Azeez	19-04-1996	31-07-1998
K. M. Buharideen	01-08-1998	05-11-1999
M. I. Thaibdeen	11-02-2000	12-11-2003
K. M. Buharideen	13-11-2003	20-03-2006
J. M. Nisfer	20-03-2006	15-06-2006
Kamil Sarap	16-06-2006	02-08-2007
J. M. Iqbal	02-08-2007	01-09-2018
Abdul Kalam	01-09-2018	15-08-2019
Siddique Najeen	15-08-2019	09-05-2025
L. M. Abdul Azeez	09-05-2025	Currently in office

== Notable alumni ==
- Abdul Cader Shahul Hameed (former Foreign Minister)
