= John William Ronald Illangakoon =

Ceylonese lawyer (1894–1982)

John William Ronald Ilangakoon KC

25th Attorney General of Ceylon
- In office 1 October 1936 – 1942
- Governor: Reginald E. Stubbs; Andrew Caldecott
- Preceded by: John Curtois Howard
- Succeeded by: Manikku Wadumestri Hendrick de Silva

11th Solicitor General of Ceylon
- In office 1935–1935
- Governor General: Reginald E. Stubbs
- Preceded by: L. M. D. de Silva
- Succeeded by: Arthur Wijewardena

Personal details
- Born: 16 August 1894
- Died: 1982 (aged 87–88)

John William Ronald Ilangakoon, KC (16 August 1894 – 1982) was a Ceylonese lawyer. He was the 25th Attorney General of Ceylon and 11th Solicitor General of Ceylon.

Having studied law at Cambridge University and qualifying as a barrister, he became an advocate. In 1928 he was appointed a District Judge and in 1935 he was appointed Solicitor General succeeding L. M. D. de Silva. He was succeeded by Arthur Wijewardena and was appointed King's Counsel in 1936. He was appointed Attorney General on 1 October 1936, succeeding John Curtois Howard, and held the office until 1942. He was succeeded by Manikku Wadumestri Hendrick de Silva. He was the first Sinhalese to hold the office of Attorney General.

He married Annette Lena Dias Bandaranaike daughter of Justice Felix Reginald Dias Bandaranaike I on 10 October 1914. His brother S. W. Illangakoon was the Mudaliyar of Colombo.

Legal offices
Preceded by John Curtois Howard	Attorney General of Ceylon; 1936–1942	Succeeded by Manikku Wadumestri Hendrick de Silva
Preceded by L. M. D. de Silva	Solicitor General of Ceylon; 1935	Succeeded by Arthur Wijewardena
