= Edward Jayetileke =

Chief Justice of Ceylon from 1950 to 1952

Sir Edward Jayetileke
- KC

29th Chief Justice of Ceylon
- In office 1950–1952
- Appointed by: Henry Monck-Mason Moore
- Preceded by: Arthur Wijewardena
- Succeeded by: Alan Rose

Puisne Justice of the Supreme Court of Ceylon
- In office 14 May 1942 – ?

13th Solicitor General of Sri Lanka
- In office 1939–1940
- Governor: Andrew Caldecott
- Preceded by: Arthur Wijewardena
- Succeeded by: M. W. H. de Silva

Personal details
- Born: 11 October 1888
- Died: 2 August 1975 (aged 86)

Sir Edward George Perera Jayetileke KC (11 October 1888 – 2 August 1975) was a Sri Lankan judge who was the 29th Chief Justice of Ceylon as well as the 13th Solicitor General. He was appointed in 1950 succeeding Arthur Wijewardena and was Chief Justice until 1952. He was succeeded by Alan Rose.

Jayetileke received a knighthood in 1951 for his services as Chief Justice in the 1951 New Year Honours.

Legal offices
Preceded by Arthur Wijewardena	Chief Justice of Ceylon; 1950-1952	Succeeded by Alan Rose
Preceded by Arthur Wijewardena	Solicitor General of Ceylon; 1939-1940	Succeeded by M. W. H. de Silva
