= Sidney Abrahams =

Chief Justice of British Ceylon from 1936 to 1939 and athlete

The Right Honourable Sir Sidney Abrahams QC
- Sir Sidney Abrahams

26th Chief Justice of Ceylon
- In office 3 July 1936 – 1939
- Appointed by: Reginald Edward Stubbs
- Preceded by: Philip James Macdonell
- Succeeded by: John Curtois Howard; Francis Soertsz as acting

Personal details
- Born: 1 February 1885 Birmingham, England
- Died: 14 May 1957 (aged 72) London, England
- Education: Cambridge University
- Sports career
- Sport: Athletics
- Event: long jump
- Club: University of Cambridge AC; Achilles Club

Sir Sidney Solomon Abrahams PC QC (11 February 1885 – 14 May 1957), nicknamed Solly, was a British barrister, judge, and Olympic athlete. He served as Chief Justice of Ceylon and as a member of the Judicial Committee of the Privy Council. He was the older brother of famed Olympian Harold Abrahams.

== Early life ==
Born in Birmingham, England, Abrahams was educated at Bedford Modern School and Emmanuel College, Cambridge.

He competed in athletics for Cambridge University from 1904 to 1906. At the unofficial Olympiad, the 1906 'Intercalated Games' held in Athens, he finished fifth in the long jump with 6.21 metres. Abrahams finished second behind Tim Ahearne in the long jump event at the 1909 AAA Championships.

At the 1912 Stockholm Olympics, he finished in twelfth place in the same event at 6.72 metres. At the 1913 AAA Championships in London, he won the long jump with 6.86 metres.

=== Career ===
He studied law at the Middle Temple and was called to the bar in 1909.

He joined the Colonial Service and was Advocate General in Baghdad in 1920 and President of the Civil Courts in Basra in 1921. After serving as Attorney General of Zanzibar (1922), Uganda (1925) and Gold Coast (1928), Abrahams was appointed Chief Justice of Uganda in 1933 and Chief Justice of Tanganyika in 1934.

He then served as Chief Justice of Ceylon from 1936 to 1939 and was knighted in 1936. The most celebrated case he presided over was that of the Australian Mark Anthony Bracegirdle, whom the Governor of British Ceylon Sir Reginald Stubbs was attempting to have deported; the court ruled against the Governor. He was the founder-president of the Medico-Legal Society of Ceylon. He was succeeded by John Curtois Howard, after the acting Francis Soertsz. He retired from the bench in 1939.

In 1941, he was sworn in as a member of the Privy Council and served on the Judicial Committee of the Privy Council.

Sidney Abrahams chaired a Committee on the Administration of Justice in Nigeria. He was later Senior Legal Assistant to the Commonwealth Relations Office. He played a major role in the suspension of the People's Progressive Party Government of Cheddi Jagan in British Guiana (Guyana) in 1953.

He was elected president of the London Athletic Club. Abrahams was the first Jew to hold the post.

Abrahams was married to Ruth Bowman and they had two children, Valerie and Anthony Abrahams.

== See also ==
- List of select Jewish track and field athletes
- List of British Jewish sportspeople

Legal offices
Preceded by Philip James Macdonell	Chief Justice of Ceylon; 1936-1939	Succeeded by John Curtois Howard; Francis Soertsz as acting
