= John Whyatt =

British colonial judge (1905–1978)

Sir John Whyatt

2nd Chief Justice of the Colony of Singapore
- In office 1955–1958
- Preceded by: Sir Charles Murray-Aynsley
- Succeeded by: Sir Alan Rose

Attorney-General of Barbados
- In office 1948–1951

Attorney General of Kenya
- In office 1951–1955

Personal details
- Born: 13 April 1905
- Died: 14 March 1978 (aged 72) Sussex
- Education: Balliol College, Oxford
- Occupation: Colonial judge

Sir John Whyatt (13 April 1905 – 14 March 1978) was a colonial judge who served as Chief Justice of Singapore from 1955 to 1958.

== Early life and education ==
Whyatt was born on 13 April 1905. He was educated at Stonyhurst College and Balliol College, Oxford.

== Career ==
Whyatt joined the colonial legal service in 1937 and went to Hong Kong as Assistant Crown Solicitor, and in the following year was appointed Crown Counsel, Hong Kong. In 1941, he was seconded to the Eastern Group Supply Council in India as Secretary. In 1944, he returned to Hong Kong and served with the planning department at the Colonial Office. The following year, he went to Australia as supplies officer for the Colonial Office in Australia, and served as adviser to the British representative of UNRRA at its meeting in Sydney. In 1946, he returned to Hong Kong as Custodian of Energy Property.

Whyatt served as Attorney-General of Barbados in 1948, and from 1951 to 1955, he was Attorney General of Kenya and Minister for Legal Affairs. During the Kenya Emergency, he faced exceptional challenges as government member for law and order dealing with unrest and crime. In order to tackle the large number of prosecution cases accumulating, his responsibility for the police force was transferred to the Chief Secretary. In 1955, he was appointed Chief Justice of Singapore and remained in the post until his retirement in 1958.

In 1961, Whyatt was recalled from retirement to serve as President of the Committee of Justice set up to inquire into current procedures for handling citizens' grievances against the government and public bodies, and to consider improvements, with reference to the use of Ombudsman in Scandinavian countries, and he recommended in his report the appointment of a Parliamentary Commissioner to investigate such claims. In the same year, he was appointed judge of the Chief Court for the Persian Gulf and remained in the post until 1966, when he became Director of Studies of the Government Legal Officers course.

== Personal life and death ==
Whyatt married Margaret Stewart in 1936 and they had a son.

Whyatt died on 14 March 1978 in Sussex, aged 73.

== Honours ==
Whyatt was created a Knight Bachelor in the 1957 Birthday Honours.
