= Hema Henry Basnayake =

Chief Justice of Ceylon from 1956 to 1964

Hema Henry Basnayake QC

31st Chief Justice of Ceylon
- In office 1 January 1956 – 31 July 1964
- Appointed by: Viscount Soulbury
- Preceded by: Alan Rose; Chellappah Nagalingam as acting
- Succeeded by: Miliani Sansoni

29th Attorney General of Ceylon
- In office 11 October 1951 – 31 December 1955
- Governors General: Herwald Ramsbotham; Oliver Ernest Goonetilleke
- Preceded by: Edward Percival Rose
- Succeeded by: Edward Fredrick Noel Gratiaen

16th Solicitor General of Ceylon
- In office 1 March 1946 – 1947
- Appointed by: Henry Monck-Mason Moore
- Preceded by: J. M. Fonseka
- Succeeded by: M. F. S. Pulle

Personal details
- Born: 3 August 1902
- Died: Unknown

Hema Henry Basnayake, QC (3 August 1902 – ?) was the 31st Chief Justice of Ceylon as well as the 29th Attorney General and 16th Solicitor General. He was appointed in 1956 succeeding acting Chellappah Nagalingam and was Chief Justice until 1964.

== Legal career ==
Basnayake was admitted as an Advocate on 9 March 1927. Starting his legal practice in the Unofficial Bar, he acted as a Crown Counsel on several occasions between May 1928 to June 1932. On 20 June 1932, he was appointed Crown Counsel. From Oct 1937 to September 1937, he served as Commissioner for preparation and revision of the Legislative Enactments of Ceylon. In 1939, he served as acting Assistant Legal Draftsman and was promoted to Senior Crown Counsel on 1 October 1944. During this time he served on several occasions as acting Solicitor General. On 1 March 1945, he was appointed Solicitor General and took silks as a King's Counsel in 1946. He served as acting Attorney General on several occasions. On 23 October 1947, he was appointed a Puisne Justice of the Supreme Court of Ceylon. On 11 October 1951, he was appointed Attorney General and held the position until 31 December 1955. He prosecuted journalist Herbert Hulugalle on charge of contempt of court and secured a conviction resulting in a two day jail sentence for Hulugalle. Hulugalle was defended by J. R. Jayewardene.

On 1 January 1956, he was appointed Chief Justice of Ceylon, succeeding Sir Alan Rose and held the position until his retirement on 31 July 1964. He was succeeded by Miliani Sansoni.

He succeeded Peter de Abrew as a trustee of Musaeus College in 1940 and served as Chairman of the Board of Trustees. Sinha Basnayake is his son.

Legal offices
Preceded by Alan Rose; Chellappah Nagalingam as acting	Chief Justice of Ceylon; 1956-1964	Succeeded by Miliani Sansoni
Preceded by Edward Percival Rose	Attorney General of Ceylon; 1951-1956	Succeeded by Edward Fredrick Noel Gratiaen
Preceded by J. M. Fonseka	Solicitor General of Ceylon; 1946-1947	Succeeded by M. F. S. Pulle
