= Sinha Basnayake =

Sri Lankan lawyer

Sinha Basnayake, PC is a Sri Lankan lawyer. He was a former director of the General Legal Division of the United Nations Office of Legal Affairs and a member of the UN Internal Justice Council.

Son of the prominent lawyer Hema Henry Basnayake, QC; he was educated at the Royal College, Colombo and graduated with a first-class in law from the University of Oxford. After qualifying as a barrister he joined the UN as a Legal Officer in the International Trade Law Branch of the Office of Legal Affairs, eventually becoming its director. Appointed a President's Counsel by the government of Sri Lanka, he has served in many committees of the UN.

- In 1999, he served as the Secretary of the group of legal experts of the International Criminal Tribunal for the former Yugoslavia and International Criminal Tribunal for Rwanda.
- In 2004, he served as a member of the Special Panel set up by the Secretary-General to investigate and report on the bombing of the United Nations headquarters in Baghdad.
- In 2005, he served as the Secretary of the Group set up by the Secretary-General to study the criminal accountability of staff and experts on mission serving in peacekeeping operations, as suggested by the Prince Zeid report on a comprehensive strategy to eliminate future sexual exploitation and abuse in United Nations peacekeeping operations.
- In 2009, he was a member of a UN Board of Inquiry that reviewed and investigated several incidents in the Gaza Strip in which death or injuries occurred at, and/or damage was done to, United Nations premises or in the course of United Nations operations.
