= Wijeyadasa Rajapakshe =

Sri Lankan lawyer and politician

Hon. Wijeyadasa Rajapakse PC
- විජයදාස රාජපක්ෂ விஜயதாச ராஜபக்ஷ
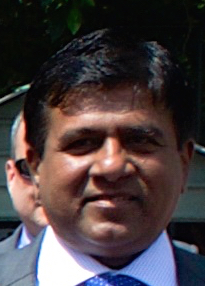

Minister of Justice, Prison Affairs and Constitutional Reforms
- In office 12 May 2022 – 29 July 2024
- President: Gotabaya Rajapaksa; Ranil Wickremesinghe
- Prime Minister: Ranil Wickremesinghe; Dinesh Gunawardena
- Preceded by: Ali Sabry
- Succeeded by: Ali Sabry
- In office 12 January 2015 – 23 August 2017
- President: Maithripala Sirisena
- Prime Minister: Ranil Wickremesinghe
- Preceded by: Rauff Hakeem
- Succeeded by: Thalatha Atukorale

Minister of Higher Education and Cultural Affairs
- In office 1 May 2018 – 26 October 2018
- President: Maithripala Sirisena
- Prime Minister: Ranil Wickramasinghe
- Preceded by: Kabir Hashim

Minister of Education
- In office 29 October 2018 – 15 December 2018
- President: Maithripala Sirisena
- Prime Minister: Mahinda Rajapakse

Minister of Buddha Sasana
- In office 4 September 2015 – 23 August 2017
- President: Maithripala Sirisena
- Prime Minister: Ranil Wickremesinghe
- Preceded by: Karu Jayasuriya
- Succeeded by: Gamini Jayawickrama Perera

Non-Cabinet Minister for State Banks Development
- In office 23 November 2005 – 23 April 2010
- President: Mahinda Rajapaksa
- Prime Minister: Ratnasiri Wickremanayake

Member of Parliament for Colombo District
- In office 2010 – 24 September 2024

Member of Parliament for National List
- In office 2004–2010

Chairman of the Sri Lanka Freedom Party
- Disputed
- In office 12 May 2024 – 20 May 2024
- Preceded by: Maithripala Sirisena

Personal details
- Born: 16 March 1959 (age 67)
- Party: Sri Lanka Freedom Party (2004–2010, since 2024); United National Party (2010–2019); Sri Lanka Podujana Peramuna (2019–2024)
- Profession: Lawyer

Wijeyadasa Rajapakse, MP, PC (born 16 March 1959) is a Sri Lankan lawyer and politician. He was the Minister of Justice from 2022 to 2024 and from 2015 to 2017. He was the prime minister's nominee for the Constitutional Council of Sri Lanka.

During the 2018 Sri Lankan constitutional crisis, he had briefly served as the Minister of Education and Higher Education, and his post was suspended by the court in 2018. He was controversially appointed as the chairman of the Sri Lanka Freedom Party in 2024 and was announced as the party's presidential candidate in the 2024 presidential elections.

== Political career ==
In May 2004 he was appointed as a Member of Parliament to represent the ruling party, the Sri Lanka Freedom Party (SLFP) and was offered the Ministry of Constitutional Affairs which was refused by him. Later he continued as the only Member of Parliament on the government side, without holding any portfolio. Following the 2005 presidential elections, President Mahinda Rajapaksa appointed him as the Minister of State Banking Development in November 2005, but he resigned in April 2006 on a matter of policy. He also resigned from the post of the party organiser in the Maharagama electorate. Thereafter he was elected the Chairman of the Committee On Public Enterprises in July 2006 and presented the first report in January 2007, which led to serious controversies both local and overseas. He gained publicity for highlighting corruption in the public sector. In 2007, LMD magazine named him "Sri Lankan of the year 2007".

In 2010, he was elected to Parliament from the Colombo District. In 2012, he was elected President of the Bar Association of Sri Lanka. During his tenure he led the Bar Association in support of former Chief Justice Shirani Bandaranayake during her impeachment. Following the 2015 presidential election he was appointed Minister of Justice. In 2017, he was sacked from his ministerial position by President Maithripala Sirisena at the request by the United National Party due to his views against the privatisation and involvement of the judiciary by the government. He was appointed Minister of Higher Education and Cultural Affairs in May 2018. In 2018, with the onset of the 2018 Sri Lankan constitutional crisis, he was appointed to the new cabinet of ministers headed by Mahinda Rajapaksa as the Minister of Education and Higher Education in October 2018.

=== MV X-Press Pearl compensation controversy ===
Wijeyadasa Rajapakshe was appointed Minister of Justice, Prison Affairs and Constitutional Reforms by in May 2022 by Gotabaya Rajapaksa and continued in this capacity under Ranil Wickremesinghe. In August 2023, he confirmed that the owners of X-Press Pearl had agreed to pay compensation of USD 878,000 and LKR 16 Million after the Government of Sri Lanka had initially claimed USD 40 million in 2021. This was after earlier that year, when he had claimed that local official had been bribed by the insurer of the tanker MV X-Press Pearl.

=== Chairman of Sri Lanka Freedom Party ===
Rajapakshe was appointed the chairman of Sri Lanka Freedom Party on 12 May 2024, following the resignation of Maithripala Sirisena. However on 20 May, the Colombo District Court issued an interim order preventing Rajapakshe from functioning as the party chairman, after considering a complaint submitted by Duminda Dissanayake.

=== 2024 presidential campaign ===
In 2024, Rajapakshe announced that he would be running for president in the 2024 elections. He resigned from his ministerial post on 29 July 2024 to run for office. At the election, Rajapakshe won 21,306 votes, less than 1% of all votes cast.
