= Eric Basnayake =

Sri Lankan Judge

The Honourable Justice Eric Basnayake

Justice of the Court of Appeal of Sri Lanka
- In office 2005–2014

Personal details
- Education: University of Ceylon, Royal College, Colombo

Justice Eric Lloyd Basnayake is a Sri Lankan Judge. He was a Justice of the Court of Appeal of Sri Lanka and Court of Appeal of Fiji as well as a Judge of the High Courts and District Courts in Sri Lanka.

Basnayake received his primary education at St. Thomas College, Kotte and completed his secondary education at Royal College, Colombo. Thereafter he entered University of Ceylon, Colombo in 1969 graduating with an LL.B and was admitted to the bar in December 1975. He had apprenticed under Vernon Wijethunge, QC and Nimal Senanayake, PC.

He joined the Attorney General's Department as a State Counsel in 1979. He left the Attorney General's Department in 1987 on his appointment as a District Judge in September 1987. In this capacity he served as District Judge in Ampara, Kalutara, Embilipitiya, Kurunegala, Mt. Lavinia and Colombo. He was thereafter appointed as a Judge of the High Court in February 1999 serving in Kurunegala, Hambantota, Kegalle and Colombo. His last appointment in the High Court was that of Presiding Judge of the Trial-at-Bar which was constituted to hear the Udathalawinna murder case.

In February 2005 he was appointed to as a Justice of the Court of Appeal of Sri Lanka and served until his retirement from the judicial service. In 2015, he was appointed as a Justice of the Court of Appeal of Fiji. He was the President of the Judicial Service Association.
