= Mervyn Fonseka =

Sri Lankan lawyer

J. M. Fonseka

15th Solicitor General of Ceylon
- In office 1943–1945
- Governor General: Andrew Caldecott
- Preceded by: M. W. H. de Silva
- Succeeded by: Hema Henry Basnayake

Personal details
- Born: 1897
- Died: 1946 (aged 48–49)

Mervyn Fonseka, OBE, KC (1897–1946) was a Sri Lankan lawyer. He was the 15th Solicitor General of Ceylon.

Educated at the Royal College, Colombo and at the Colombo Law College. He taught briefly at Royal College before he joined the legal service as a Crown Counsel in 1928, later serving as an assistant to the Attorney General. Taking up appointment as Assistant Legal Draftsman, he was later promoted to the post of Legal Draftsman and served as acting Legal Secretary on several occasions. He was appointed Solicitor General in 1943, succeeding M. W. H. de Silva. Foneska took silks as a King's Counsel that year and held the office until 1945. During his tenure, he served as the acting Attorney-General.

Legal offices
Preceded by M. W. H. de Silva	Solicitor General of Ceylon; 1943–1945	Succeeded by Hema Henry Basnayake
