= Harshana Nanayakkara =

Justice Minister of Sri Lanka since 2024

Hon. Harshana Nanayakkara MP
- හර්ෂණ නානායක්කාර ஹர்ஷண நாணயக்கார

Minister of Justice and National Integration
- Incumbent
- Assumed office 18 November 2024
- President: Anura Kumara Dissanayake
- Prime Minister: Harini Amarasuriya
- Preceded by: Harini Amarasuriya

Member of Parliament for Colombo District
- Incumbent
- Assumed office 21 November 2024
- Majority: 82,275 Preferential votes

Personal details
- Born: Delgahawatte Harshana Nanayakkara; 16 January 1972 (age 54)
- Party: National People's Power
- Parents: Yasapalitha Nanayakkara (father); Manoshi Perera (mother)
- Relatives: Vasudeva Nanayakkara (uncle); Hemakumara Nanayakkara (uncle); Somasiri Alakolanga (uncle-in-law); Rajeewa Nanayakkara (brother)
- Profession: Lawyer

Harshana Nanayakkara (born 16 January 1972) is a Sri Lankan former film actor, lawyer, and politician currently serving as the Minister of Justice and National Integration of the Government of Sri Lanka since November 2024. He is a member of the Parliament of Sri Lanka from Colombo Electoral District since November 2024 as a member of the National People's Power. He is also a national executive committee Member of NPP.

Minister Nanayakkara has stated that he intends to repeal the Prevention of Terrorism Act and replace it with a new law.

== Personal life ==
His father Yasapalitha Nanayakkara was a popular director in Sri Lankan cinema and stage drama as well as a screenwriter, producer, lyricist and actor. His mother Manoshi Perera was a housewife. Harshana has four uncles - Vasudeva, Padmakumara, Hemakumara, Asanga and four aunties - Swarna Sakunthala, Ranjani, Lanka and Nilmini. Harshana's two uncles: Vasudeva Nanayakkara is a former minister and a member of the parliament, and Hemakumara Nanayakkara is a former minister and governor of Western Province.

Educated at Isipathana College, Colombo.

His uncle Somasiri Alakolanga, who is married to Harshana's mother's younger sister is also an actor. His elder brother, Rajeewa is also an actor, screenplay writer, and assistant director.

== Notable comments ==
"Courts are not there simply for Judges to earn salaries or for lawyers to make money." (උසාවි තියෙන්නේ නඩු කාරයින්ට පඩි ගන්නයි, නීතිඥවරුන්ට හම්බ කරන්නයි නෙවෙයි).

He said this asking the courts to expedite hearings and judgements addressing numerous complaints and the general dissatisfaction of the general public.

Prior to this, he is also quoted as saying (circa 2018):

"Politicians use the Constitution like toilet paper"

"Our political culture is on default mode"

== Electoral history ==
Electoral history of Harshana Nanayakkara
| Election | Constituency | Party | Votes | Result | Ref |
|---|---|---|---|---|---|
| 2020 parliamentary | Colombo District | National People's Power | 5,477 | Not elected | |
| 2024 parliamentary | Colombo District | National People's Power | 82,275 | Elected | |

== Filmography ==
He has acted in 5 films.

| Year | Film | Role | Ref. |
|---|---|---|---|
| 1977 | Age Adara Kathawa | | |
| 1981 | Geethika | | |
| 1991 | Sihina Ahase Wasanthe | assistant director | |
| 1993 | Yasasa | | |
| 1995 | Cheriyo Captain | Tuntun | |
| 2001 | Dinuma Kageda | | |

Political offices
| Preceded by Harini Amarasuriya | Minister of Justice and National Integration; November 2024–present | Incumbent |
