= A. C. S. Hameed =

Sri Lankan politician (1927–1999)

Minister of Foreign Affairs
- In office July 23, 1977 – March 28, 1990
- President: J. R. Jayewardene (1977–89); Ranasinghe Premadasa (1989–90)
- Preceded by: Sirimavo Bandaranaike
- Succeeded by: Ranjan Wijeratne
- In office 12 August 1993 – 15 August 1994
- President: Dingiri Banda Wijetunga (1993–94)
- Preceded by: Harold Herath
- Succeeded by: Lakshman Kadirgamar

Minister of Justice
- In office 1990–1993
- President: Ranasinghe Premadasa (1990–93)
- Preceded by: Vincent Perera
- Succeeded by: Harold Herath

Personal details
- Born: April 10, 1927 Akurana, Sri Lanka
- Died: September 3, 1999 (aged 72)
- Party: United National Party
- Education: St. Anthony's College, Kandy; Vijaya College, Matale; Zahira College, Matale

Abdul Cader Shahul Hameed (10 April 1927 – 3 September 1999) was a Sri Lankan diplomat and prominent political figure. He served as Minister of Foreign Affairs of Sri Lanka from 1977 to 1989; and from 1993 to 1994. In the intervening period, he was Minister of Justice & Higher Education of Sri Lanka.

Born on 10 April 1927 in Kurugoda, Akurana, he was educated at St. Anthony's College, Katugastota; Vijay College, Matale and Zahira College, Matale. Joining the United National Party in 1956, he contested the March 1960 general election from Akurana and was elected to parliament. He was re-elected in all the consecutive elections and in 1970 changed his electorate to Harispattuwa and continued to be re-elected until his death in 1999. In 1978, he was appointed the first Minister of Foreign Affairs, a position that had been held by the Prime Minister since 1948. He served as Foreign Minister until 1989, becoming the longest-serving Foreign Minister in Sri Lanka. From 1989 to 1993 he served as Justice Minister from 1989 to 1993 before taking over as Foreign Minister from 1993 to 1994. He remained a member of the opposition until his death on 3 September 1999. He had been awarded honorary doctorates by the Hankuk University and the University of Sri Jayawardenepura.

== See also ==
- Ministry of Foreign Affairs (Sri Lanka)
- List of St. Anthony's College, Kandy alumni

Political offices
Preceded by Office Created	Minister of Foreign Affairs of Sri Lanka; 1978–1989	Succeeded by Ranjan Wijeratne
Preceded by Harold Herath	Minister of Foreign Affairs of Sri Lanka; 1993–1994	Succeeded by Lakshman Kadirgamar
