= Harold Herath =

Sri Lankan politician and Cabinet Minister

Hon. Deshabandu Harold Herath

Minister of Foreign Affairs
- In office 1991–1993
- President: Ranasinghe Premadasa
- Prime Minister: Dingiri Banda Wijetunga
- Preceded by: Ranjan Wijeratne
- Succeeded by: Abdul Cader Shahul Hameed

Minister of Justice
- In office 1993–1994
- President: Dingiri Banda Wijetunga
- Prime Minister: Ranil Wickremasinghe
- Preceded by: Abdul Cader Shahul Hameed
- Succeeded by: G. L. Peiris

Minister of Coconut Development

Member of Parliament for Puttalam District
- In office 1989–2000

Personal details
- Born: 10 March 1930 Nattandiya, British Ceylon (now in Sri Lanka)
- Died: 31 August 2007 (aged 77) Colombo, Sri Lanka
- Party: United National Party
- Other political affiliations: United National Front
- Spouse: Gwen Herath
- Children: 3

Deshabandu James Edward Herath Herald known as Harold Herath (10 March 1930 – 31 August 2007) was a senior Sri Lankan politician and Cabinet Minister. Herath was most notably Minister of Foreign Affairs under President Ranasinghe Premadasa from 1991 to 1993. He entered Parliament winning the Nattandiya electorate in the Puttalam Electoral District 1977, and held his seat until 2000 retiring not contesting the 2001 parliamentary election. He has also held the portfolios of Minister of Justice and Minister of Coconut Development.

In 2005 Harold Herath was conferred the national honour and title Deshabandu by President Chandrika Kumaratunga. Harold Herath died on 31 August 2007 after a brief illness, he was 77. He was married to Gwen Herath, a former Provincial Council member and President of the Women's Cricket Association of Sri Lanka (WCASL), and was father to three children.

== See also ==
- Minister of Foreign Affairs (Sri Lanka)

Preceded by	Member of Parliament for Puttalam; 1977–10 October 2000	Succeeded by
Political offices
Preceded by ?	Minister of Coconut Development –	Succeeded by ?
Preceded by Abdul Cader Shahul Hameed	Minister of Justice; 1993–1994	Succeeded by Gamini Peiris
Preceded by Ranjan Wijeratne	Minister of Foreign Affairs; 1991–1993	Succeeded by Abdul Cader Shahul Hameed
