= Francis Soertsz =

Sri Lankan judge

Sir Francis Soertsz KC

Acting Chief Justice of Ceylon
- In office 1946–1946
- In office 1945–1945
- Preceded by: John Curtois Howard
- Succeeded by: John Curtois Howard
- In office 1939–1939
- Preceded by: Sidney Abrahams
- Succeeded by: John Curtois Howard

Puisne Justice of the Supreme Court of Ceylon

Personal details
- Born: 14 March 1886
- Died: 10 January 1951 (aged 64)

Sir Francis Joseph Soertsz KC (14 March 1886 – 10 January 1951) was an Acting Chief Justice of Ceylon who served on three occasions, in 1939, 1945 and 1946.

Soertsz was born in 1886, the son of Francis William and Emily Josephine Soertsz. He was educated at Saint Joseph's College, Colombo and the Law College of Ceylon.

He was knighted in the 1947 New Year Honours.

Legal offices
Preceded by	Acting Chief Justice of Ceylon; 1946	Succeeded by
Preceded by John Curtois Howard	Acting Chief Justice of Ceylon; 1945	Succeeded by
Preceded by Sidney Abrahams	Acting Chief Justice of Ceylon; 1939	Succeeded by John Curtois Howard
