= M. W. H. de Silva =

Ceylonese lawyer, judge and statesman

M. W. H. de Silva QC

Minister of Justice
- In office 1956–1959
- Governor General: Oliver Goonetilleke
- Preceded by: E. B. Wikramanayake
- Succeeded by: Valentine S. Jayawickrema

Puisne Justice of the Supreme Court of Ceylon
- In office 1946–1947

Ceylonese representative in India
- In office 1947–1948
- Preceded by: Tikiri Bandara Panabokke II
- Succeeded by: Senate Abolished

26th Attorney General of Ceylon
- In office 7 July 1942 – 1946
- Governor: Andrew Caldecott
- Preceded by: John William Ronald Illangakoon
- Succeeded by: Chellappah Nagalingam

Personal details
- Born: 22 September 1886
- Died: 6 March 1960 (Aged 73)
- Education: University of London
- Profession: Advocate

Manikku Wadumestri Hendrick de Silva, QC (22 September 1886 - 6 March 1960) was a Ceylonese lawyer, judge and statesman. He served in several top legal positions in the island, as the 26th Attorney General of Ceylon, a Puisne Justice of the Supreme Court of Ceylon and finally the Minister of Justice in the cabinet of S. W. R. D. Bandaranaike as a member of the Senate of Ceylon.

== Legal career ==
Having graduated from the University of London, de Silva became an Advocate. Joining the Attorney General's Department, de Silva served as a Crown Counsel and a Senior Crown Counsel, before being appointed Deputy Solicitor General. As Deputy Solicitor General, de Silva led the prosecution of the famous Duff House murder case in 1934. He served as Solicitor General of Ceylon from 1941 to 1942, in which year he was also appointed King's Counsel. He was appointed Attorney General of Ceylon on 7 July 1942, succeeding John William Ronald Illangakoon, and held the office until 1946. He was succeeded by Chellappah Nagalingam. He was thereafter called to the bench as an acting Puisne Judge, but retired in 1947 to take up appointment as Representative of the Government of Ceylon in India, serving until Ceylon gained self rule in 1948. In 1949, he chaired the commission of inquiry to investigate allegations of bribery in the Colombo Municipal Council.

== Minister of Justice ==
He was appointed to the Senate of Ceylon and made Minister of Justice by Prime Minister S. W. R. D. Bandaranaike in 1956. He introduced conciliation boards through the Conciliation Broads Act and attempted to regulate fees charged by proctors and advocates, but was met by stiff resistance from the legal practitioners which included threats of trade union action. He served until June 1959 when he resigned from the Cabinet, two days after a Cabinet reshuffle in which he retained the seat.

== Family ==
He was the great-uncle of Harsha de Silva.

Political offices
Preceded by E. B. Wikramanayake	Minister of Justice; 1956-1959	Succeeded by Valentine S. Jayawickrema
Diplomatic posts
Preceded by Tikiri Bandara Panabokke II	Ceylonese representative in India; 1947–1948	Succeeded by Abolished
Legal offices
Preceded by John William Ronald Illangakoon	Attorney General of Ceylon; 1942–1946	Succeeded by Chellappah Nagalingam
Preceded by Edward Jayetileke	Solicitor General of Ceylon; 1941–1942	Succeeded by J. M. Fonseka
