= Sam Peter Christopher Fernando =

Sri Lankan politician (1909-?)

Hon. Sam Peter Christopher Fernando MP

Minister of Justice

Senator of Ceylon

Ceylon's Ambassador to Egypt

Personal details
- Born: 18 January 1909 Colombo
- Died: Colombo
- Education: Prince of Wales' College, Moratuwa; S. Thomas' College, Mount Lavinia
- Occupation: Politician, Diplomat
- Profession: Barrister

Sam Peter Christopher Fernando (18 January 1909 – after 1962), was a Ceylonese (Sri Lankan) lawyer, politician and diplomat. He was the former Cabinet Minister of Justice and a Senator. He had also served as Ceylon's Ambassador to Egypt.

He was educated at Prince of Wales' College, Moratuwa; S. Thomas' College, Mount Lavinia and at the University College, Colombo; Fernando became a barrister at the Gray's Inn.

Having established his legal practice, he was nominated by the then Minister of Local Government, the S. W. R. D. Bandaranaike as a member of the Moratuwa Urban Council. Later he was appointed to the Senate of Ceylon by Sirimavo Bandaranaike and appointed as minister of justice on 23 July 1960 serving till March 1965. In this capacity he held much influence in the cabinet of Mrs Bandaranaike, playing a major role in the prosecution of the 1962 attempted coup and the takeover of Roman Catholic schools by the government. Later he was appointed as Ceylon's ambassador to Egypt.

His daughter Sicille is married to Deshamanya Deshabandu Lalith Kotelawala.

== See also ==
- Sri Lankan Non Career Diplomats
