= Valentine S. Jayawickrema =

Ceylonese politician

Senator Valentine S. Jayawickrema was a Ceylonese politician. He was the Minister of Justice in the cabinet of W. Dahanayake and a member of the Senate of Ceylon.

He succeeded M. W. H. de Silva as Minister of Justice and to his seat in the Senate (appointed by the Governor General), following de Silva's resignation. Appointed by Prime Minister Dahanayake, the Ceylon Police Force was placed under the Minister. Soon he faced a motion of no confidence in Parliament which he survived and remained the only original Sri Lanka Freedom Party member to remain in the Dahanayake cabinet.
