= List of parliaments of Sri Lanka =

This is a complete list of all Sri Lankan parliaments since 1931, including their beginnings, endings, and dates of sessions.

== List of parliaments ==
#	Parliament	Began	Session	Session opened	Session adjourned	Ended	Duration	Governing party
State Council of Ceylon (1931–1947)
1	1st State Council	6 July 1931				7 December 1935	4 years, 5 months and 1 day	None
2	2nd State Council	16 March 1936				4 July 1947	11 years, 3 months and 18 days	None
Parliament of Ceylon (1947–1972)
3	1st Parliament	14 October 1947	1	25 November 1947	31 January 1948	8 April 1952	4 years, 5 months and 25 days	United National Party
3	1st Parliament	14 October 1947	2	10 February 1948	17 June 1949	8 April 1952	4 years, 5 months and 25 days	United National Party
3	1st Parliament	14 October 1947	3	12 July 1949	6 April 1950	8 April 1952	4 years, 5 months and 25 days	United National Party
3	1st Parliament	14 October 1947	4	20 June 1950	24 April 1951	8 April 1952	4 years, 5 months and 25 days	United National Party
3	1st Parliament	14 October 1947	5	20 June 1951	8 April 1952	8 April 1952	4 years, 5 months and 25 days	United National Party
4	2nd Parliament	9 June 1952	1	10 June 1952	29 April 1953	18 February 1956	3 years, 8 months and 9 days	United National Party
4	2nd Parliament	9 June 1952	2	7 July 1953	31 March 1954	18 February 1956	3 years, 8 months and 9 days	United National Party
4	2nd Parliament	9 June 1952	3	12 April 1954	27 April 1955	18 February 1956	3 years, 8 months and 9 days	United National Party
4	2nd Parliament	9 June 1952	4	7 June 1955	18 February 1956	18 February 1956	3 years, 8 months and 9 days	United National Party
5	3rd Parliament	19 April 1956	1	20 April 1956	3 May 1957	5 December 1959	3 years, 7 months and 16 days	SLFP led Mahajana Eksath Peramuna
5	3rd Parliament	19 April 1956	2	13 June 1957	15 May 1958	5 December 1959	3 years, 7 months and 16 days	SLFP led Mahajana Eksath Peramuna
5	3rd Parliament	19 April 1956	3	4 June 1958	23 May 1959	5 December 1959	3 years, 7 months and 16 days	SLFP led Mahajana Eksath Peramuna
5	3rd Parliament	19 April 1956	4	30 June 1959	5 December 1959	5 December 1959	3 years, 7 months and 16 days	SLFP led Mahajana Eksath Peramuna
6	4th Parliament	30 March 1960	1	6 April 1960	23 April 1960	23 April 1960	24 days	United National Party
7	5th Parliament	5 August 1960	1	12 August 1960	4 July 1961	17 December 1964	4 years, 4 months and 12 days	Sri Lanka Freedom Party
7	5th Parliament	5 August 1960	2	13 July 1961	20 June 1962	17 December 1964	4 years, 4 months and 12 days	Sri Lanka Freedom Party
7	5th Parliament	5 August 1960	3	11 July 1962	6 May 1963	17 December 1964	4 years, 4 months and 12 days	Sri Lanka Freedom Party
7	5th Parliament	5 August 1960	4	17 July 1963	12 March 1964	17 December 1964	4 years, 4 months and 12 days	Sri Lanka Freedom Party
7	5th Parliament	5 August 1960	5	2 July 1964	12 November 1964	17 December 1964	4 years, 4 months and 12 days	Sri Lanka Freedom Party
7	5th Parliament	5 August 1960	6	20 November 1964	17 December 1964	17 December 1964	4 years, 4 months and 12 days	Sri Lanka Freedom Party
8	6th Parliament	5 April 1965	1	9 April 1965	22 June 1966	25 March 1970	4 years, 11 months and 20 days	United National Party
8	6th Parliament	5 April 1965	2	8 July 1966	20 June 1967	25 March 1970	4 years, 11 months and 20 days	United National Party
8	6th Parliament	5 April 1965	3	8 July 1967	22 June 1968	25 March 1970	4 years, 11 months and 20 days	United National Party
8	6th Parliament	5 April 1965	4	7 July 1968	25 June 1969	25 March 1970	4 years, 11 months and 20 days	United National Party
8	6th Parliament	5 April 1965	5	10 July 1969	25 March 1970	25 March 1970	4 years, 11 months and 20 days	United National Party
9	7th Parliament	7 June 1970	1	14 June 1970	23 March 1971	22 May 1972	1 year, 11 months and 15 days	Sri Lanka Freedom Party
9	7th Parliament	7 June 1970	2	28 March 1971	22 May 1972	22 May 1972	1 year, 11 months and 15 days	Sri Lanka Freedom Party
National State Assembly (1972–1978)
10	1st National State Assembly	22 May 1972	1	22 May 1972	10 February 1977	10 February 1977	4 years, 8 months and 19 days	Sri Lanka Freedom Party
11	2nd National State Assembly	4 August 1977	1	4 August 1977	7 September 1978	7 September 1978	1 year, 1 month and 3 days	United National Party
Parliament of Sri Lanka (1978–present)
12	8th Parliament	7 September 1978	1	7 September 1978	26 March 1982	20 December 1988	10 years, 3 months and 13 days	United National Party
12	8th Parliament	7 September 1978	2	29 April 1982	7 January 1983	20 December 1988	10 years, 3 months and 13 days	United National Party
12	8th Parliament	7 September 1978	3	9 February 1983	19 January 1984	20 December 1988	10 years, 3 months and 13 days	United National Party
12	8th Parliament	7 September 1978	4	23 February 1984	25 January 1985	20 December 1988	10 years, 3 months and 13 days	United National Party
12	8th Parliament	7 September 1978	5	20 February 1985	31 January 1986	20 December 1988	10 years, 3 months and 13 days	United National Party
12	8th Parliament	7 September 1978	6	20 February 1986	27 January 1987	20 December 1988	10 years, 3 months and 13 days	United National Party
12	8th Parliament	7 September 1978	7	19 February 1987	22 January 1988	20 December 1988	10 years, 3 months and 13 days	United National Party
12	8th Parliament	7 September 1978	8	25 February 1988	20 December 1988	20 December 1988	10 years, 3 months and 13 days	United National Party
13	9th Parliament	9 March 1989	1	9 March 1989	23 March 1990	24 June 1994	5 years, 3 months and 15 days	UNP led coalition
13	9th Parliament	9 March 1989	2	4 April 1990	21 March 1991	24 June 1994	5 years, 3 months and 15 days	UNP led coalition
13	9th Parliament	9 March 1989	3	19 April 1991	30 August 1991	24 June 1994	5 years, 3 months and 15 days	UNP led coalition
13	9th Parliament	9 March 1989	4	24 September 1991	23 March 1993	24 June 1994	5 years, 3 months and 15 days	UNP led coalition
13	9th Parliament	9 March 1989	5	22 April 1993	24 June 1994	24 June 1994	5 years, 3 months and 15 days	UNP led coalition
14	10th Parliament	25 August 1994	1	25 August 1994	15 December 1994	18 August 2000	5 years, 11 months and 24 days	SLFP led People's Alliance
14	10th Parliament	25 August 1994	2	6 January 1995	12 January 1996	18 August 2000	5 years, 11 months and 24 days	SLFP led People's Alliance
14	10th Parliament	25 August 1994	3	9 February 1996	18 August 2000	18 August 2000	5 years, 11 months and 24 days	SLFP led People's Alliance
15	11th Parliament	18 October 2000	1	18 October 2000	27 October 2000	10 October 2001	11 months and 22 days	SLFP led People's Alliance
15	11th Parliament	18 October 2000	2	9 November 2000	10 July 2001	10 October 2001	11 months and 22 days	SLFP led People's Alliance
15	11th Parliament	18 October 2000	3	6 September 2001	10 October 2001	10 October 2001	11 months and 22 days	SLFP led People's Alliance
16	12th Parliament	19 December 2001	1	19 December 2001	3 November 2003	7 February 2004	2 years, 1 month and 19 days	UNP led United National Front
16	12th Parliament	19 December 2001	2	19 November 2003	7 February 2004	7 February 2004	2 years, 1 month and 19 days	UNP led United National Front
17	13th Parliament	22 April 2004	1	22 April 2004	21 November 2005	9 February 2010	5 years, 9 months and 18 days	SLFP led United People's Freedom Alliance
17	13th Parliament	22 April 2004	2	25 November 2005	6 May 2008	9 February 2010	5 years, 9 months and 18 days	SLFP led United People's Freedom Alliance
17	13th Parliament	22 April 2004	3	5 June 2008	17 May 2009	9 February 2010	5 years, 9 months and 18 days	SLFP led United People's Freedom Alliance
17	13th Parliament	22 April 2004	4	19 May 2009	9 February 2010	9 February 2010	5 years, 9 months and 18 days	SLFP led United People's Freedom Alliance
18	14th Parliament	22 April 2010	1	22 April 2010	26 June 2015	26 June 2015	5 years, 2 months and 4 days	SLFP led United People's Freedom Alliance
19	15th Parliament	1 September 2015	1	1 September 2015	12 April 2018	2 March 2020	4 years, 6 months and 1 day	UNP led United National Front for Good Governance
19	15th Parliament	1 September 2015	2	8 May 2018	27 October 2018	2 March 2020	4 years, 6 months and 1 day	UNP led United National Front for Good Governance
19	15th Parliament	1 September 2015	3	14 November 2018	2 December 2019	2 March 2020	4 years, 6 months and 1 day	UNP led United National Front for Good Governance
19	15th Parliament	1 September 2015	4	3 January 2020	2 March 2020	2 March 2020	4 years, 6 months and 1 day	UNP led United National Front for Good Governance
20	16th Parliament	20 August 2020	1	20 August 2020	12 December 2021	24 September 2024	4 years, 1 month and 4 days	SLPP led Sri Lanka People's Freedom Alliance
20	16th Parliament	20 August 2020	2	18 January 2022	28 July 2022	24 September 2024	4 years, 1 month and 4 days	SLPP led Sri Lanka People's Freedom Alliance
20	16th Parliament	20 August 2020	3	3 August 2022	27 January 2023	24 September 2024	4 years, 1 month and 4 days	SLPP led Sri Lanka People's Freedom Alliance
20	16th Parliament	20 August 2020	4	8 February 2023	26 January 2024	24 September 2024	4 years, 1 month and 4 days	SLPP led Sri Lanka People's Freedom Alliance
20	16th Parliament	20 August 2020	5	7 February 2024	24 September 2024	24 September 2024	4 years, 1 month and 4 days	SLPP led Sri Lanka People's Freedom Alliance
21	17th Parliament	21 November 2024	1	21 November 2024	TBA	Incumbent	6 months and 8 days	JVP led National People's Power

== See also ==
- Parliament of Sri Lanka
- Cabinet of Sri Lanka
