= Lalitha Rajapakse =

Ceylonese lawyer and politician

Sir Lalitha Rajapakse QC

High Commissioner for Ceylon to the United Kingdom
- In office February 1967 – October 1969
- Monarch: Elizabeth II
- Prime Minister: Dudley Senanayake
- Preceded by: Gunapala Piyasena Malalasekera
- Succeeded by: M. V. P. Peiris

Minister of Justice
- In office 26 September 1947 – 1953
- Prime Minister: D. S. Senanayake; Dudley Senanayake
- Preceded by: Office Created
- Succeeded by: E. B. Wikramanayake

Personal details
- Born: Louis Alexander Rajapakse; 3 May 1900 Herambe Walauwwa, Balapitiya, British Ceylon
- Died: 25 May 1976 (aged 76)
- Party: United National Party
- Spouse: Chrysobel Rajapakse
- Children: 3
- Education: Ananda College, Saint Joseph's College, Colombo, University of London
- Occupation: Advocate
- Profession: Barrister

Sir Lalitha Abhaya Rajapaksa, QC (born Louis Alexander Rajapakse; 3 May 1900 – 25 May 1976) was a Ceylonese lawyer and politician. He was the first Minister of Justice of Ceylon and a member of the Senate of Ceylon.

== Early life and education ==
Born Louis Alexander Rajapakse at Herambe Walauwwa in the southern coastal town of Balapitiya, Rajapakse received his primary and secondary education in Ananda College, and Saint Joseph's College, Colombo. He joined the first batch of students to enter the University College, Colombo, where he was the first cricket captain and won the Obeysekara gold medal in athletics in 1922. He graduated in 1922 with a BA degree from the University of London External Programme and proceeded to London where he attended University of London. He obtained a Bachelor of Laws in 1924, became a barrister having called to the bar in 1924 from the Lincoln's Inn. In 1925, he achieved the feat of youngest person at the time to receive Doctor of Laws (LLD) in the world.

== Legal career ==
On his return to Ceylon 1925, Rajapakse began his legal practice as an advocate in the Unofficial Bar, mainly in civil law in apex courts. He served as a lecturer and examiner at the Ceylon Law College and was a member of the Council of Legal Education. In 1944, he took silk as a King's Counsel and was appointed Commissioner of Assize in 1946, an appointment he relinquished quickly and returned to his lucrative legal practice.

== Politician and Diplomat ==
Rajapakse was a founding member of the United National Party in 1947 and was appointed to the Senate of Ceylon and became the leader of the house. He was soon after appointed by Prime Minister D. S. Senanayake as the first Minister of Justice. In 1948 he was appointed to the seven member flag committee that consisted of S. W. R. D. Bandaranaike, J. R. Jayawardene, John Kotelawala, T. B. Jayah, G. G. Ponnambalam and S. Nadesan. He was knighted in the 1952 New Year Honours. He resigned as Minister of Justice in 1953, after Prime Minister Sir John Kotelawala requested his resignation from the cabinet and returned to his legal practice.

In 1965, he actively campaigned for the United National Party, specking of authoritarian actions of the Sri Lanka Freedom Party, following its attempts to nationalize Lake House. Following the United National Party victory in the 1965 general elections, he was appointed Ceylon's Ambassador to France in 1965. In February 1967 he was appointed the Ceylon's High Commissioner to the United Kingdom which he held until October 1969.

Rajapakse died on 25 May 1976, at the age of 76.

== Family ==
Rajapakse married Chrisoble Mendis Gunasekara, her sister Ruby Mendis Gunasekara became the first lady Proctor in Ceylon. Their son Bimal, became a barrister from Lincoln's Inn and they had two daughters, Ramani became a proctor and headed the All Ceylon Women's Buddhist Congress and Vineetha who married Jayantha Gunasekera is a President's Counsel.

== See also ==
- Sri Lankan Non Career Diplomats
