= Minister of Defence (Sri Lanka) =

Minister of Defence of Sri Lanka
- ශ්‍රී ලංකා ආරක්ෂක අමාත්‍ය
- Emblem of Sri Lanka

- Flag of Sri Lanka

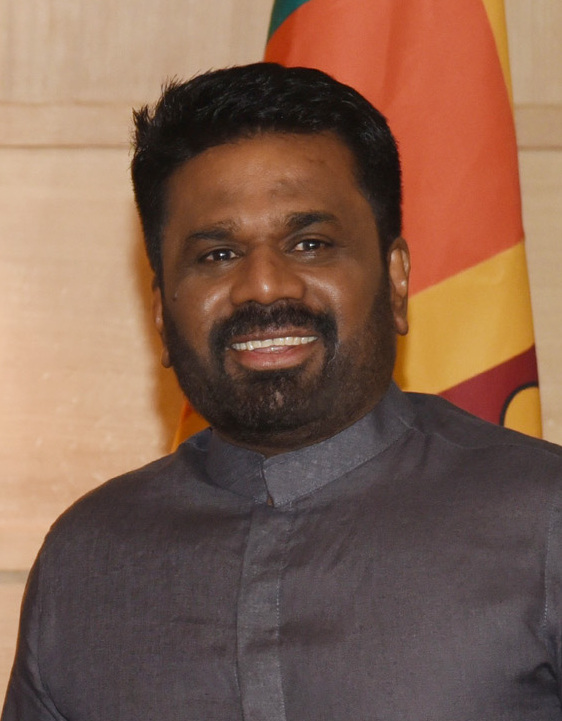
- Incumbent; Anura Kumara Dissanayake since 24 September 2024
- Ministry of Defence
- Appointer: President of Sri Lanka
- Inaugural holder: Don Stephen Senanayake
- Formation: 24 September 1947
- Website: www.defence.lk

The Minister of Defence is an appointment in the Cabinet of Sri Lanka who is responsible for the implementation of the Government of Sri Lankas defence policy and the headquarters of the Sri Lankan Armed Forces. The post was first created in 1947 as Minister of External Affairs and Defence, in 1978 the Ministry of External Affairs and Defence separated into two ministries, the Ministry of Foreign Affairs and the Ministry of Defence. Prior to the separation of the post the Minister of External Affairs and Defence was held by the Prime Minister since 1947, with a Parliamentary Secretary for Defence and External Affairs who was an elected parliamentarian and was the de facto foreign minister.

== List of Defence Ministers ==
No.	Portrait	Name (Born-Died)	Term			Political Party	Head(s) of Government
No.	Portrait	Name (Born-Died)	Took office	Left office	Time in office	Political Party	Head(s) of Government
Minister of External Affairs and Defence
1	D. S. Senanayake	D. S. Senanayake (1883–1952)	24 September 1947	22 March 1952 †	4 years, 180 days	UNP	D. S. Senanayake
2	Dudley Senanayake	Dudley Senanayake (1911–1973)	22 March 1952	12 October 1953	1 year, 204 days	UNP	Dudley Senanayake
3	John Kotelawala	John Kotelawala (1895–1980)	12 October 1953	12 April 1956	2 years, 183 days	UNP	John Kotelawala
4	S. W. R. D. Bandaranaike	S. W. R. D. Bandaranaike (1899–1959)	12 April 1956	26 September 1959 †	3 years, 167 days	SLFP	S. W. R. D. Bandaranaike
5	Wijeyananda Dahanayake	Wijeyananda Dahanayake (1901–1997)	26 September 1959	20 March 1960	176 days	Sinhala Language Front	Wijeyananda Dahanayake
(2)	Dudley Senanayake	Dudley Senanayake (1911–1973)	21 March 1960	21 July 1960	122 days	UNP	Dudley Senanayake
6	Sirimavo Bandaranaike	Sirimavo Bandaranaike (1916–2000)	21 July 1960	25 March 1965	4 years, 247 days	SLFP	Sirimavo Bandaranaike
(2)	Dudley Senanayake	Dudley Senanayake (1911–1973)	25 March 1965	29 May 1970	5 years, 65 days	UNP	Dudley Senanayake
(6)	Sirimavo Bandaranaike	Sirimavo Bandaranaike (1916–2000)	29 May 1970	23 July 1977	7 years, 55 days	SLFP	Sirimavo Bandaranaike
7	J. R. Jayewardene	J. R. Jayewardene (1906–1996)	23 July 1977	4 February 1978	196 days	UNP	J. R. Jayewardene
Minister of Defence
1	Ranasinghe Premadasa	Ranasinghe Premadasa (1924–1993)	1989	?	?	UNP	Ranasinghe Premadasa
2	Ranjan Wijeratne	Ranjan Wijeratne (1931–1991)	?	?	?	UNP	Ranasinghe Premadasa
3	Dingiri Banda Wijetunga	Dingiri Banda Wijetunga (1916–2008)	7 May 1993	12 November 1994	1 year, 189 days	UNP	Dingiri Banda Wijetunga
4	Chandrika Kumaratunga	Chandrika Kumaratunga (born 1945)	12 November 1994	12 December 2001	7 years, 30 days	SLFP	Chandrika Kumaratunga
5	Tilak Marapana	Tilak Marapana (born 1942)	12 December 2001	4 November 2003	1 year, 327 days	UNP	Chandrika Kumaratunga
(4)	Chandrika Kumaratunga	Chandrika Kumaratunga (born 1945)	4 November 2003	19 November 2005	2 years, 15 days	SLFP	Chandrika Kumaratunga
Minister of Defence and Urban Development
1	Mahinda Rajapaksa	Mahinda Rajapaksa (born 1945)	19 November 2005	8 January 2015	9 years, 50 days	SLFP	Mahinda Rajapaksa
Minister of Defence
6	Maithripala Sirisena	Maithripala Sirisena (born 1951)	12 January 2015	18 November 2019	4 years, 310 days	SLFP	Maithripala Sirisena
7	Gotabaya Rajapaksa	Gotabaya Rajapaksa (born 1949)	28 November 2019	14 July 2022	2 years, 228 days	SLPP	Gotabaya Rajapaksa
8	Ranil Wickremesinghe	Ranil Wickremesinghe (born 1949)	15 July 2022	23 September 2024	2 years, 70 days	UNP	Ranil Wickremesinghe
9	Anura Kumara Dissanayake	Anura Kumara Dissanayake (born 1968)	23 September 2024	Incumbent	2 years, 33 days	NPP	Anura Kumara Dissanayake

== See also ==
- Ministry of Defence
- Ministry of External Affairs and Defence
- Minister for Internal Security (Ceylon)
