= Campus of University of Colombo =

College campus in Colombo, Sri Lanka

The urban campus of University of Colombo is located in Colombo, Sri Lanka, primarily situated around Cinnamon Gardens.

== Campus ==
The University of Colombo occupies an estate of 50 acres (200,000 m^{2}) in the heart of the city of Colombo known as Cinnamon Gardens. The administrative center of the university is the College House, which houses the office of the vice chancellor, with its period architecture is a city landmark.

The College House, the Faculty of Graduate Studies and the Institute of Biochemistry, Molecular Biology and Biotechnology (IBMBB) is located along Thurstan Road between Queens Road and the India House. Situated between the Thurstan Road and Reed Avenue is the iconic Old Royal College Building, King George Hall, New Arts Theatre, sports ground along with the buildings of the science faculty and the School of Computing. On the other side of the Reed Avenue is the university library flanked by the arts and law faculty buildings along with the gymnasium.

The estate includes several properties outside Cinnamon Gardens, such as the Faculty of Medicine which is located at Kynsey Road opposite the Colombo General Hospital close to the Postgraduate Institute of Medicine located at Norris Canal Road. The Institute of Indigenous Medicine is located in the suburbs of Colombo in Nawala. In addition, there are several properties outside Colombo, including the Sri Palee Campus in Wewala, Horana and the Institute of Agro Technology and Rural Science in Hambantota.

== Cinnamon Gardens ==
Much of the faculties of University of Colombo situated in and around the fashionable residential area of Cinnamon Gardens. Separated from to maid roads of Colombo, the campus consists of three blocks.

=== College House Block ===
==== The College House ====
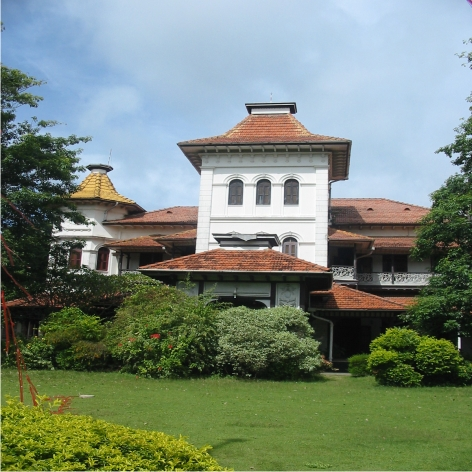
College House the administrative headquarters of the University of Colombo.

The College House Block occupies the estate of the former Regina Walauwa, now known as the College House, with its period architecture is a city landmark, located along Thurstan Road between Queens Road and the India House. The College House is the administrative center of the university, therefore the office of the vice-chancellor, Registrar’s office, administrative staff and support staff are located here. The stores and vehicle deport could be found here along with the university tennis courts too.

==== New FGS & Administration building ====
Located at the rear of historic college house is the four floor buildings built in the 1980s. It houses the Faculty of Graduate Studies and several support staff units including student affairs and internal audit units.

==== IBMBB building ====
Built opposite College House is the newly built five floor building for the Institute of Biochemistry, Molecular Biology and Biotechnology. It is the country's foremost center of research into biotechnology and related fields.

=== Science faculty block ===
Science faculty block makes up the center of the campus complex, between the Thurstan Road; Reed Avenue and boarded in the north by the Royal College Colombo. Located here are the iconic Old Royal College Building, King George Hall, New Arts Theatre as well as many department and faculty buildings of the School of Computing, Department of Nuclear Science, Department of Physics, Department of Plant Science, Department of Zoology and the Faculty of Management and Finance. The University Health Center is based here as well.

==== Old Royal College Building ====
The Old Royal College Building is the main building of the University. The iconic symbol of the University of Colombo, it is located on campus center in front of the university sports grounds, and presently houses the Department of Mathematics. It was built in 1911 for the Royal College Colombo before it was transferred to the Ceylon University College a year after its formation in 1921.

==== King George Hall ====
The King George Hall (KGH or KG Hall) is one of the oldest theaters of Sri Lanka. Built the mid 1920s following the establishment of the Ceylon University College it was meant function as a theater, main lecture hall and venue for many university functions, a purpose it serves to this day.

==== Sports grounds ====
The university sports ground forms a triangular spear in front of the building façade, pointing due south. At the southern tip of the grounds are Thurstan Road and Reed Avenue, connecting at Thumulla Junction. The sports ground is a venue for many sporting events year-round, with cricket, rugby union, soccer, athletics, netball, and basketball played here. Originally part of the Alfred House Estate, it was gifted by E.L.F. de Soysa, a son of the famous philanthropist Sir Charles Henry de Soysa. Located on the Thurstan Road side of the southern tip is the Old University Pavilion, dating back to the 1930s, along with the university bookshop and post office.

==== University Observatory ====
The former Colombo Observatory is located within the science faculty block adjoin Reed Avenue. Although not operational at present it was established in 1920s was put into disrepair due to World War II and the Insurrection 1987-89.

=== Arts and Law faculty block ===
On the other side of the Reed Avenue is the Arts faculty block, made up of the arts and law faculty buildings along with the gymnasium. Located in the centre is the university library.

==== Planetarium ====
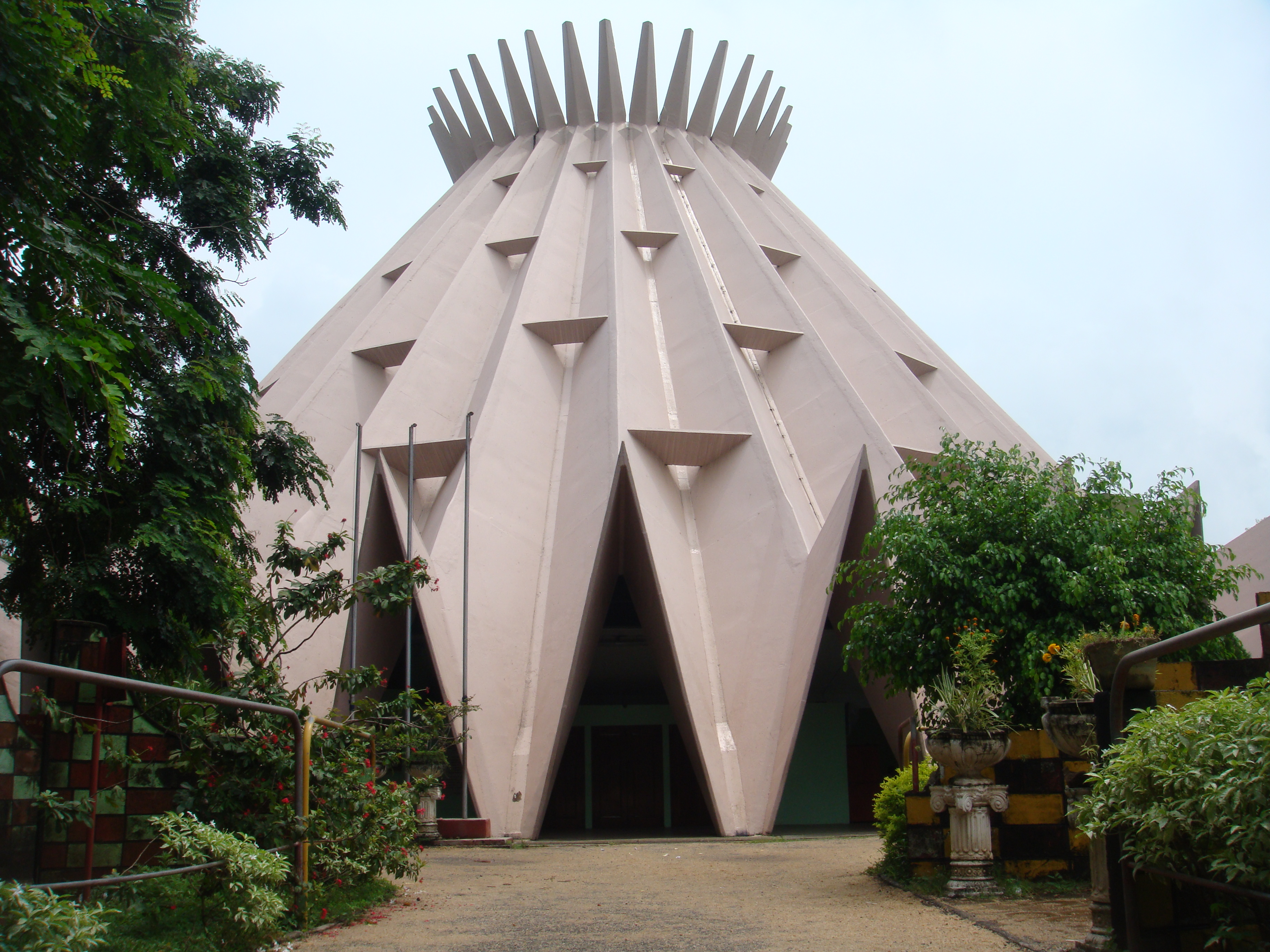
planetarium exterior designed by Dr. A. N. S. Kulasinghe

Created as an exhibit for the industrial exhibition held in 1965, the Colombo Planetarium in the Arts and Law Faculty Block is the only planetarium in Sri Lanka. The domed planetarium seats 570 around a Carl Zeiss AG star projector.

== Colombo Medical College ==
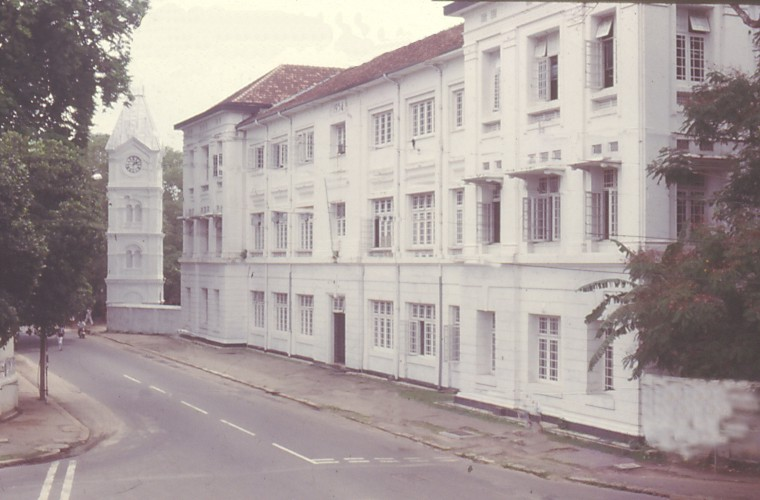
The Faculty of Medicine building and the Koch Memorial Clock Tower on Kynsey Road.

The Faculty of Medicine building which is located at Kynsey Road opposite the Colombo General Hospital close to the Postgraduate Institute of Medicine located at Norris Canal Road. The current Anatomy Department Building which was built in 1913 provides the primary facade at Kynesy Road next to the Koch Memorial Clock Tower named after Dr. E.L.Koch, the second principle of the Colombo Medical School.

== Sri Palee Campus ==
The Sri Palee Campus, known as the western campus of the University of Colombo is located in Wewala, Horana. Located in the Kalutara District on lands and buildings donated to the University of Sri Lanka in 1976 by the board of the Sri Palee Trust set up by the late Wilmot A. Perera, a statesman and philanthropist.

== Institute of Agro Technology and Rural Science ==
The Institute of Agro Technology and Rural Science of the university is located in the rural area of Hambantota District in the Southern Province. Started in 1999 in Weligatta new town which had been constructed under Lunugamvehera Irrigation project, it was developed with the collaboration of the Irrigation Department.
