= University of Colombo library =

Network of libraries in University of Colombo, Sri Lanka

University of Colombo Library
- Location: Colombo, Sri Lanka
- Type: Academic library
- Established: 1870
- Branches: 3

Collection
- Items collected: books, journals, newspapers, magazines, sound and music recordings, maps, prints, drawings and manuscripts

Access and use
- Population served: University of Colombo and worldwide
- Members: University of Colombo (and some other groups on application)

Other information
- Website: Official Website

University of Colombo library is a centrally administered network of libraries in University of Colombo, Sri Lanka. It is home to one of the largest and oldest collections in Sri Lanka, with its roots dating back to 1870 with the establishment of the library of the Ceylon Medical College.

== History ==
In 1870 the medial library of the Ceylon Medical College was established at its premises. After the establishment of the Ceylon University College in 1921 a new library was founded for the university college supporting its two departments of Arts and Science. It began in a room of College House with a collection of books belonging to Arunachalam Padmanabha, donated by his father Sir Ponnambalam Arunachalam. The first volume of the 11th edition of Encyclopædia Britannica was given the accession number 1.

With the establishment of the University of Ceylon, the Ceylon University College and the Ceylon Medical College were amalgamated, forming the new university. Therefore the libraries of the University College and Medical College were amalgamated yet were based separate. University College library that became the University of Ceylon library was housed at the former residence of Sir Marcus Fernando, the Villa Venezia in Queens Road by this time; the Medical College library which became the Medical Faculty Library was housed at the Ceylon Medical College building in Kynsey Road.

Following completion of buildings at Peradeniya Arts and Oriental Studies faculties were moved in the early 1950s. With this move, collections of the library used by these faculties were shifted to the new seven-story library building in Peradeniya along with much of its administrators. The Medical Faculty Library remained at its original location and collections of the library used by the Science Faculty moved to the facility premises at the Old Royal College Building. This led to the formation of two semi-independent branches of libraries that continue to this day under the University of Colombo library system.

Following re-transfer of the departments of Law and Education, as well as the re-establishment of the Arts faculty, a new collection began to support these faculties as well as other centers and institutions that began emerging in the Colombo Campus of the University of Ceylon from 1952 to 1972, thereafter the University of Sri Lanka from 1972 to 1978. In 1979 with the formal establishment of the University of Colombo, the University of Colombo library system was born. Due to a lack of a permanent building the units of the library kept moving until the Central Library Building was built in the late 1990s at Reed Avenue. The Law library collection was moved here to the second floor as collections of Humanities, Education, Management and Social Sciences. Two semi-independent branches of libraries faction at the Medical Faculty and the Science Faculty. All other faculties, departments and institutes maintain their own libraries for reference purposes with collections lend from the central library.

== Lineage ==
University of Colombo library was changed its name from time to time as follows:

- Medical Library, Ceylon Medical College (Since 1870)
- Library, Ceylon University College (1921 to 1942)
- Library, University of Ceylon (1942 to 1952)
  - Science library, Faculty of Science (Since 1932)
  - Law library, Faculty of Law (Since 1949)
- Library, University of Ceylon, Colombo (1952 to 1972)
- Library, Colombo Campus, University of Sri Lanka (1972 to 1978)
- Library, University of Colombo (Since 1979)

== Central Library ==
The newly built library building is located at Reed Avenue flanked by the arts and law faculty buildings along with the gymnasium.

== e-Repository ==
University of Colombo e-Repository is a collection of scientific research publications by researchers at the University of Colombo, Sri Lanka. This e-Repository serves to manage, preserve and make available the academic works of the faculty, postgraduate students, and research groups. The collection includes faculty publications, masters and doctoral theses. This repository is updated regularly, and new works are added to collections on a continuous basis.

== Branches ==
- Central Library
- Medical Library
- Science Library

== See also ==
- University of Colombo
- List of libraries in Sri Lanka
