= Joseph Lionel Christie Rodrigo =

Ceylonese academic

Joseph Lionel Christie Rodrigo, CMG (1895 - 1972) was a Ceylonese academic. He was the professor of Western classics and dean of the faculty of arts of the University of Ceylon.

Born in Panadura to J. A. G Rodrigo, Rodrigo was educated at Royal College, Colombo, before moving to Trinity College, Kandy for his final year here he won the Ryde Gold Medal and the Ceylon Government Scholarship to read classics at Balliol College, Oxford, where he gained first in greats and a MA. At Oxford he was contemporary of S.W.R.D. Bandaranaike. He then qualified as a barrister from Gray's Inn and gained a Diploma in Journalism from the University of London. Returning to Ceylon, Rodrigo became the editor of the Ceylon Morning Leader owned by his uncle A. J. R. de Soysa, succeeding Armand de Souza. He then moved to academia, becoming the headmaster of Wesley College, Colombo. He then joined the Ceylon University College as an assistant lecturer. He was appointed professor of classics in 1947 and then dean of the faculty of arts of the University of Ceylon. He served in the board of governors of Trinity College and Ladies College and as chairman of the Church Missionary Society Schools and education officer in the Ceylon High Commission in London. He was appointed a Companion of the Order of St Michael and St George in the 1956 New Year Honours.

Rodrigo married Evelyn Fernando, daughter of Dr Solomon Fernando, who was one of the first western qualified physicians in the island, and her mother was a daughter of Charles Henry de Soysa. They had three daughters and two sons, including Dr Nalin Rodrigo.
