= Nalin Rodrigo =

Jayatissa Nalin Rodrigo
- Born: 1929; Ceylon
- Died: 2006 (aged 76–77); Sri Lanka
- Education: University of Colombo; Royal College Colombo
- Occupations: Consultant Obstetrician and Gynaecologist
- Employer: Ministry of Health Sri Lanka
- Known for: President Sri Lanka College of Obstetricians 1981-83, Medical Teacher, Chairman Sri Jayawardanapura General Hospital
- Title: Dr

Jayatissa Nalin Rodrigo FRCS FRCOG was a Sri Lankan Obstetrician and Gynaecologist, Surgeon, Medical Teacher and Medical Administrator.,

== Family, early life and education ==
Rodrigo was a great-grandson Sir Charles Henry de Soysa. His father Professor J. L. C. Rodrigo from a famous family of Panadura was a Ryde Gold Medal winner at Trinity College, Kandy, read classics at Oxford University as a contemporary of S. W. R. D. Bandaranaike and was Professor of Western Classics at the University of Ceylon. Educated at Royal College Colombo, Rodrigo studied medicine Colombo Medical College now known as Faculty of Medicine, University of Colombo

== Career ==
Rodrigo trained in Sri Lanka and in the United Kingdom where he became a member of the Royal College of Obstetricians and Gynaecologists by examination. He was one of the 4 house officers appointed at the inception of Castle Street Maternity Hospital 1n 1952. He returned to Sri Lanka spending 19 years in peripheral hospitals before being appointed to Castle Street Hospital for Women.

== Contributions to maternal and child health ==
Rodrigo made many contributions to developing the speciality in Sri Lanka, served as president of the Sri Lanka College of Obstetricians and Gynaecologists. Rodrigo trained many of the leading Obstetricians in practice and was regarded as a mentor by many. Professor Chamberlain, President of the Royal College of Obstetricians and Gynaecologists is reputed to have commented on his role as a trainer of Obstetricians with a statement that "he (Prof Chamberlain) seemed to be the only Obstetrician in the country who had not worked with Dr. Rodrigo". Rodrigo is referred to as "the godfather of the quest to reduce maternal mortality and doyen of obstetricians" by Dr MALR Perera Secretary of Health.

== Leadership positions ==
Rodrigo was President Sri Lanka College of Obstetricians 1981-83 and served on its council for two decades and was also Editor and its Patron. He also served as chairman of the Board of Study in Obstetrics and Gynaecology at the Postgraduate Institute of Medicine University of Colombo Rodrigo also served as chairman of the board at Sri Jayawardanapura General Hospital and medical director of Asha Central Hospital, During his tenure as chairman between 1988 and 1994 with Dr RC Rajapakse was medical director and Dr. Narme Wikramasinghe as Deputy Medical Director, the hospital developed specialist units such as Renal Disease (Dr Chula Herath) in addition to others where local expertise was lacking like scoliosis surgery through attracting specialists based overseas such as Professor Randunna Corea, which ceased after his demise and Diabetes and Endocrinology through Professor Devaka Fernando, who moved the department to the university in 1992.

== Honours ==
The Sri Lanka College of Obstetricians and Gynaecologists commemorates his work through an annual award of a gold medal for an oration and the postgraduate Institute of Medicine awards a gold medal for best performance at its examination.
