= Saifee Villa =

Mansion in Colombo, Sri Lanka

Coordinates: 6°53′57.05″N 79°51′33.00″E

Saifee Villa (previously known as Lakshmigiri) is a mansion at 102, Thurstan Road in Colombo 03, Sri Lanka, located between Thunmulla Junction and College House, Colombo.

== History and Alfred Joseph Richard de Soysa ==
Lakshmigiri (built in 1910) was the stately home of Hon. A. J. R. de Soysa, Member of the Legislative Council of Ceylon, planter and musician. He was the second son of Sir Charles Henry de Soysa. Born in 1869 at Brodie House (later gifted to Ceylon University College) he was educated at S. Thomas' College, Prince of Wales' College and Royal College. He completed his education at Highbury House School St Leonards-on-Sea, where he excelled as a sprinter and pursued a degree in music at Trinity Hall, Cambridge. In 1911 he became the second member to be appointed to the Low Country Sinhalese seat of the Legislative Council of Ceylon.

The Alfred House Estate of the De Soysa family covered a large area of about 125 acres stretching from what is now Duplication road to Cinnamon Gardens; and Thunmulla Junction to Charles Circus. It is said that Sir Charles de Soysa owned a total of 48 houses in the city of Colombo. Over the years, the 125-acre Alfred House Estate underwent several subdivisions, some major changes being precipitated by the master plan for Colombo which foresaw many new roads across the estate. The earlier subdivisions were however made by the de Soysa family itself, which constructed several stately mansions within the property and gifted the land in front of Lakshmigiri to Royal College, Colombo, now the University grounds (playing fields).

The house is an example of the beautiful colonial architecture of the time. In the book India House, Colombo by Sarvodaya Vishvalekha, Lakshmigiri is described as an extravagant mix of Baroque and Italianate architecture reminiscent of a retreat of Queen Victoria with gates inspired by those of Buckingham Palace. The Gates of Lakshmigiri are identical to the gates of the Egyptian Museum, Cairo. It said that designer of the Egyptian Museum gates was inspired by the design of the gates of Lakshmigiri.

A. J. R. de Soysa had a keen interest in horse racing. It is said that he built the western and eastern towers of Lakshimigiri, to be able to observe the races taking part at the Colombo Racecourse Airstrip, situated just down the road. In 1893 he built the Chevaliar Jusey de Silva ward at the Lady Ridgeway Hospital for Children and in 1913 inaugurated the Ceylon School for the Deaf and Blind, Ratmalana. The De Soysa Trophy (formerly for shooting) is awarded for the best cadet platoon from a girls' school by the National Cadet Corps (Sri Lanka) in his memory.

== Ownership from the Soysa Family to the Adamjee Lukmanjee Family ==
According to 'Colombo Heritage' as time ran on De Soysa ran into financial difficulties and various properties were sold off, the house was mortgaged, and later foreclosed. It was then bought in and around 1923 by the Dawoodi Bohra "Adamjee Lukmanjee" family, and has remained in their ownership to date under the name "Saifee Villa".

During World War II, the Royal Air Force was temporarily shifted to the Colombo Racecourse Airstrip. Lakshmigiri is located adjoining the airstrip, therefore it was transformed into one of the RAF headquarters in Colombo. Unfortunately, it was during this time that many ornaments, antiques, chandeliers & valuable furniture was ransacked by these British troops prior to their exodus from Sri Lanka.

In 1972 under the Land Reform act, a large portion of the land surrounding Lakshmigiri was seized, and the tenants were given ownership rights. What remains today is a portion of the land that once was.

== Transformation from "Lakshmigiri" to Saifee Villa ==
The Adamjee Lukmanjee family are members of the Muslim Dawoodi Bohra community. They were honoured to house the head of the community, Syenda Taher Saifuddin, on all five of his visits to Sri Lanka at Lakshmigiri. It was considered a center for the community in Sri Lanka, as it was the venue for numerous religious and cultural gatherings.

On 19 June 1979, after the death of Syenda Taher Saifuddin, his heir Syedna Mohammed Burhanuddin, in the memory of his fathers' visits, changed the name from "Lakshmigiri" to "Saifee Villa" (where the word "Saifee" is derived from the name Saifuddin). The crown of the gates of Lakshmigiri adorns an "S" that once stood for "Soysa" family, after the name-change to "Saifee Villa", the "S" is still appropriate.

Syedna Mohammed Burhanuddin stayed once at Saifee Villa. The Villa hosts numerous functions, and religious gatherings. During the era of Syenda Taher Saifuddin, as a child, Mufaddal Saifuddin, began the recitation of the Quran in Saifee Villa.

In the year 2007 and 2008, Syedna Mohammed Burhanuddin held the 9 sermons of Ashara Mubaraka in Colombo, Sri Lanka. On both occasions, Saifee Villa was chosen as the venue for his arrival reception. Dignitaries such as Mr A. H. M. Fowzie were present at this event.

In 2007, in the first sermon of Ashara Mubaraka, he stated that Saifee Villa is a "Historical House" (tareekhi makaan).

Mufaddal Saifuddin arrived in Sri Lanka from Karachi on Monday 17 September 2012 and his arrival reception was held in Saifee Villa at 10pm. A large gathering of Dawoodi Bohra community of Colombo was present at this function. On Saturday 9 June 2013 Mufaddal Saifuddin arrived in Sri Lanka from Chennai. His arrival reception was held at Saifee Villa where a crowd of about 3,000 people were present. He also solemnized 7 wedding Nikahs on that day. Since then, he has visited at least once on each of his 15 visits to Sri Lanka.

== In popular culture ==
The house was featured in the 1981 film Kaliyugaya by Lester James Peries.

The mansion is also described in the books; Architecture and Nationalism in Sri Lanka: The Trouser Under the Cloth by Anoma Pieris and India House Colombo by Sarvodaya Vishvalekha.
