= Milroy Paul =

Ceylonese surgeon

Major Milroy Paul MRCP FRCS
- Born: 20 January 1900
- Died: 8 October 1988
- Education: Royal College, Colombo; Ceylon Medical College; King's College London
- Occupation: Surgeon

Major Milroy Aserappa Paul (20 January 1900 - 8 October 1988) was a leading Ceylonese surgeon. He was the first Professor of Surgery at the Ceylon Medical College and co-founder of the International College of Surgeons.

== Early life ==
Paul was born on 20 January 1900. He was the eledet son of S. C. Paul, a leading surgeon from Manipay in northern province of Ceylon. He had six brothers (William, Egerton, Albert, Jeyarajan, Arthur and Ellalasingam) and three sisters (Girlie Cooke, Amy Crosette-Thambiah and Tutse Rasaratnam). He was educated at Royal College, Colombo. He then went on to study medicine at Ceylon Medical College and King's College London from where he graduated in 1925 with MB degree and a Conjoint Diploma. Soon afterwards he gained the MRCP and FRCS qualification.

Paul married his cousin Winifred Hanah Ponmani, daughter of William H. Ponniah Kanagasabai, in 1926. They had one son – Wakeley. Ponmani was a sick woman and died in 1944 of cardiac failure caused by rheumatic mitral stenosis. After Ponmani's death Paul married Irma Maheswari Tampoe Phillips, daughter of Francis Philips. They had three sons (Sivanta, Amarjit and Avinder) and one daughter (Shikhandini).

== Career ==
Paul returned to Ceylon in 1926 after obtaining his medical qualifications in the UK. He applied for the post of Fifth Surgeon at Colombo General Hospital but was rejected due to his "youth and inexperience". He was instead appointed acting professor of anatomy. The Fifth Surgeon post remained vacant and two years later Paul applied for the post again. He was rejected again due to his inexperience. He was instead appointed surgical tutor in 1930. A year later he applied for the Fifth Surgeon post for the third time but was again rejected. He was advised to obtain a MS qualification and so he returned to King's College London. Paul returned to Ceylon after obtaining his MS and took up a position as surgeon at the Civil Hospital in Jaffna in 1930. In 1937 he was finally appointed Fifth Surgeon at Colombo General Hospital. In 1937 he was appointed first professor of surgery at Ceylon Medical College, a position he held until his retirement. He continued to work at Colombo General Hospital and Lady Ridgeway Hospital for Children during that time.

Paul was the first Ceylonese to deliver the Hunterian Oration at the Royal College of Surgeons of England on three occasions – The Surgical Anatomy of the Spermatic Cord (1950), Congenital Abnormalities of the Midline Abdominal Wall (1953) and Haemorrhages from Head Injuries (1955). He was also the first Ceylonese to become a member of the James IV Association of Surgeons. He was an honorary member of the Association of Surgeons of Great Britain and Ireland. He served as president of the Sri Lanka Medical Association and Registrar of the Ceylon Medical Council (1942–82). He was one of the founders of the International College of Surgeons and the Association of Surgeons of Sri Lanka. He was awarded honorary degrees by University of Colombo, University of Peradeniya and University of Jaffna. During World War II, Paul served with the Ceylon Medical Corps of the Ceylon Defence Force, holding the Major (temporary Lieutenant Colonel) as the officer in charge of the surgical division at 55 British Military Hospital, Colombo. He was the surgical consultant to the Royal Air Force in Ceylon. Paul died in 1989.

The late Paul pioneered plaster casting to treat neuropathic foot wounds and is credited with developing the total contact cast (TCC) in the 1930s for treating non-healing ulcers in Hansen's Disease (leprosy). This technique was then redeployed by others such as the late Paul Brand after several modifications and he introduced the concept in the United States in the 1960s where the technique remains the gold-standard of pressure offloading treatment in the management of neuropathic foot ulcers of the lower limb to this day.
