= Solomon Fernando =

Ceylonese physician and community leader

Solomon Fernando (1850 - 1915) was a Ceylonese physician and a community leader. He was the first Ceylonese to qualify in Western Medicine along with John Attygala and went on to serve as the Director of Health Services before his retirement. He died of a heart attack after delivering a protest speech against the imprisonment of Sinhalese by the British Colonial administration during the 1915 riots.

He married Georgina de Soysa, daughter of the wealthy philanthropist Charles Henry de Soysa and Lady Catherine de Soysa. They lived at Icicle Hall, Colombo. Professor Joseph Lionel Christie Rodrigo was his son-in-law. His brothers-in-law included Sir Marcus Fernando, Sir Wilfred de Soysa, A. J. R. de Soysa and Charles Matthew Fernando.
