= M. B. Ariyapala =

- Born: Manikku Badaturuge Ariyapla; 1 June 1916; Dodanduwa, Galle, Sri Lanka
- Died: 10 December 2006 (aged 90); Colombo, Sri Lanka
- Education: Piyarathana Vidyalaya,Dodanduwa, Mahinda College, Galle, Ceylon University College, University of London, University of Ceylon
- Occupation: Academic
- Spouse: Nilamani née de Silva
- Children: Kumundini, Harshini, Hemamala, Venya, Peshali

Manikku Badaturuge Ariyapala (1 June 1916 – 10 December 2006) was a Sri Lankan academic and former President of the Colombo Campus, University of Colombo.

Ariyapla was born 1 June 1916 in Dodanduwa, Galle. He attended school at Mahinda College, before attending Ceylon University College. He then entered the University of London, where in 1941 he obtained a Bachelor of Arts in Sinhala with first class honors. During this time he had the opportunity to teach Sinhala to Lord Soulbury, who went on to become the Governor-General of Ceylon (1949–1954). In 1949 Ariyapala obtained a PhD from the School of Oriental and African Studies at the University of London. His thesis, Society in Mediaeval Ceylon, has been extensively cited since its publication in 1956.

After becoming the President (Vice Chancellor) at the University of Colombo in 1977, Ariyapala implemented an extensive program of infrastructural activities to make Colombo Campus one of the best in the university system. He established country's first department of Linguistics in Colombo. Ariyapala was the head and first professor of the Department of Sinhala. He was also the Dean of the Faculty of Arts and Faculty of Humanities of the University of Colombo.

On 6 March 1952 he married Nilamani née de Silva, with whom he had five children: Kumundini, Harshini, Hemamala, Venya, and Peshali.

Ariyapal served as the President of the Buddhist Theosophical Society (1981-1982), President of All Ceylon Buddhist Congress (1983–1986, 1990–1991) and President of Royal Asiatic Society of Sri Lanka (1980–1985).

In 1984 he received an honorary Doctor of Letters (D. Litt.) from the University of Colombo and in 1992 an honorary D. Litt. from the University of Ruhuna.

In 1990 he collaborated with English scholar and poet, W. R. McAlpine, publishing the first English translation in verse of Kavsilumina, a historical Sinhalese love poem, which is purported to have been written by King Parakrama Bahu II.

Ariyapal died on 10 December 2006, at the age of ninety.

== Bibliography ==
- Ariyapala, M. B. (1956). Society in Mediaeval Ceylon : the state of society in Ceylon as depicted in the Saddharma-Ratnavaliya and other literature of the thirteenth century. Colombo: Ceylon Government Press (Department of Cultural Affairs).
- Ariyapala, M. B.; McAlpine, W. R. (1990). The Crest Gem of Poetry - Kavilumina. Colombo: The Royal Asiatic Society of Sri Lanka. ISBN 978-955-9086-00-0.
- Ariyapala, M. B. (Ed.) (1994). Kavsiḷumiṇa. Colombo: S. Godage and Brothers.
