= College House =

College House can refer to:

- College House, Colombo, Sri Lanka is the administrative headquarters of the University of Colombo
- College House (University of Canterbury), Ilam, Christchurch, New Zealand is a hall of residence associated with the University of Canterbury.
