= Colombo Library =

Colombo Library may refer to:

- Colombo Public Library, the largest public library in Sri Lanka
- University of Colombo library, a university library on the campus of the University of Colombo, also in Sri Lanka.
