= Journal of Science =

Journal of Science may refer to:

- American Journal of Science
- Caribbean Journal of Science
- Ceylon Journal of Science
- South African Journal of Science
- Journal of Science (1878–1885), formerly Quarterly Journal of Science, British periodical

== See also ==
- List of scientific journals
- Science (journal)
