= Percy B. Molesworth =

British astronomer

Percy Braybrooke Molesworth (2 April 1867 in Colombo – 25 December 1908) was a Major in the corps of Royal Engineers and an amateur astronomer.

== Life and work ==
Molesworth was the youngest son of Sir Guildford Molesworth, and was educated at Winchester College. He obtained his commission in the Corps of Royal Engineers in 1886 and was stationed at Fort Camden until 1891. He then was ordered to Hong Kong and three years later moved to Trincomalee on Ceylon (now called Sri Lanka). He retired in 1906 intending to pursue astronomy full-time at his estate at Trincomalee, but he died of dysentery before he could realize his plans. He is buried in the St Stephen's Cemetery in Docklands Road Trincomalee and the grave is two to the left of the memorial to the Royal Engineers. The inscription can be still seen clearly on the stone, as at Sept 19th 2013.

He was a founding member of the British Astronomical Association in 1890 and was elected a Fellow of the Royal Astronomical Society in 1898.

Molesworth was a talented observer creating first-class drawings of Mars and Jupiter in the years 1903 to 1905. He is credited with discovering a "great disturbance" in the southern bands of Jupiter on 28 February 1901. Known as the "South Tropical Disturbance" it lasted for close to forty years.

A crater on Mars was named in his honour.

The reflector telescope that he used was gifted to the University of Colombo many years after his death. It was used by Colombo University Observatory until 1988, when bandits looted the telescope's metallic parts and sold them for scrap. It has not been used since, and can still be seen at the astronomy dome of the university at Reid Avenue, Colombo 7.
