= Charles Henry de Soysa =

Ceylonese entrepreneur and philanthropist

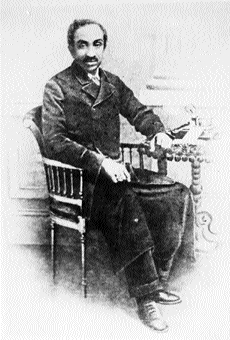
- Born: 3 March 1836; Moratuwa, Ceylon
- Died: 29 September 1890 (aged 54); Colombo, Ceylon
- Resting place: Holy Emmanuel Church
- Education: Colombo Academy, S. Thomas' College, Mutwal
- Occupations: Tea planter, Industrialist
- Known for: Philanthropy, Entrepreneurship
- Spouse(s): Catherine, Lady de Soysa
- Children: 8, including Wilfred de Soysa and A. J. R. de Soysa
- Parent(s): Mudliyar Jeronis de Soysa Dissanayake and Francesca de Soysa Lamatheni
- Relatives: Bishop Harold de Soysa (grandson); Bennet Soysa (nephew); A. H. T. de Soysa (cousin)

Charles Henry de Soysa Dharmagunawardana Vipula Jayasuriya Karunaratna Disanayaka popularly known as Charles Henry de Soysa, JP (3 March 1836 – 29 September 1890) was a Ceylonese entrepreneur and philanthropist. He was a pioneering planter, industrialist and the wealthiest Ceylonese of the 19th century. He was instrumental in the establishment of the first Ceylonese bank, the Moratuwa carpenters guild, the Ceylon Agricultural and National Associations. He is widely regarded as the greatest philanthropist of the island for contributions which includes the De Soysa Maternity Hospital, the Prince and Princess of Wales Colleges, the Model Farm Experimental Station and many other institutions and acts of charity, establishing infant-maternal healthcare and secular education for girls in the country. He would have been the island's first Knight Bachelor, but having died prior, his widow was given the rare honor of the use of the style and dignity of wife of the Knight Bachelor and was known as Catherine, Lady de Soysa.

== Early life and education ==
Charles de Soysa was born at the humble abode of his maternal grandfather in Moratuwa on 3 March 1836. He was the only son of Mudliyar Jeronis de Soysa Dissanayake and Francesca de Soysa Lamaethani (née Cooray). Jeronis de Soysa, an Ayurveda doctor, was one of the most successful merchants in Ceylon and established the largest native commercial enterprise of the era. His grandfather Warusahennadige Joseph Soysa (1764-1839), an Ayurveda practitioner, great grandfather Bastian Soysa and earlier ancestors; Don Francisco, Juan and Manual Soysa Muhandiram were salt and grain merchants having interests in the transportation, boat building and the agricultural sector. Their ancestor was the lay custodian of the Devinuwara Temple Matara at the time of its destruction in 1587. Having his primary education at the Palliyagodella Buddhist Temple in Moratuwa, de Soysa went on to gain his secondary education at the Colombo Academy and then became one of the first students of S. Thomas' College, Mutwal before completing his education at home with a tutor. He became an apprentice under his father and uncle Susew de Soysa (1809–1881) in managing the large estates and trading network of the family, starting at Hanguranketha. From a young age De Soysa had displayed a benevolent nature.

== Marriage ==
De Soysa, a devout Anglican, sought the hand of Catherine (1845–1914), the daughter of Chevalier Jusey de Silva Deva Aditya (1816–1889) and Weerahennadige Weerabala Jayasuriya Patabendi Anna Fernando (1825–1877) who were staunch Catholics. De Silva hailed from the traditional nindagam land holders of Moratuwa during the Kotte Kingdom and was a successful wholesaler and exporter of arrack. A compromise was made to solemnise the marriage according to the rites of the Roman Catholic Church and the wedding was held on 4 February 1863 at the Chevalier walauwa, Moratuwa

== Trade and Industry ==
De Soysa was a pioneering tea planter which was usually the preserve of Europeans. When the coffee crash occurred in 1869 many European planters went back home. However, De Soysas' investments were not only in coffee, which enabled him to survive the coffee crisis and expand his plantations further. De Soysa planted tea in the former coffee estates and it fetched record prices at the Colombo and London auctions. Guru Oya, Marigold, Hantana and others, established in 1870, were among the earliest tea plantations of the country.

De Soysa also cultivated citronella, coconut, cinnamon, rice, rubber, cocoa and cotton in seven of the nine provinces of the Island. His other investments included transportation, graphite mining, coffee, coir and oil mills, tea factories and the import-export trade. Built in 1870, the Wolfendhal and Diyatalawa mills were some of the earliest steam mills of Ceylon and his fibre mill was the largest in the world. C. H. de Soysa Exports was the first company registered by a Ceylon national. He constructed commercial buildings at Galle Face, Colpetty, Fort and Pettah and the De Soysa building in Slave Island, Colombo. The residential property he owned became the most sought after residential areas in latter times.

De Soysa was also the first Ceylonese banker and he was instrumental in establishing the Bank of Kandy at Dalada veediya and Pettah, Colombo in 1860. He was the first Ceylonese member of the Ceylon Chamber of Commerce. De Soysa undertook measures to improve and diversify agricultural productivity in the country by experimenting with farming methods and promoting agricultural innovations. He adopted measures to compete directly in the international market and encouraged other local entrepreneurs to do so. He introduced emerging technologies and setup incentives for his employees including pensions at a time when such a system was yet to be formally adopted by governments and institutions.

== Royal banquet ==
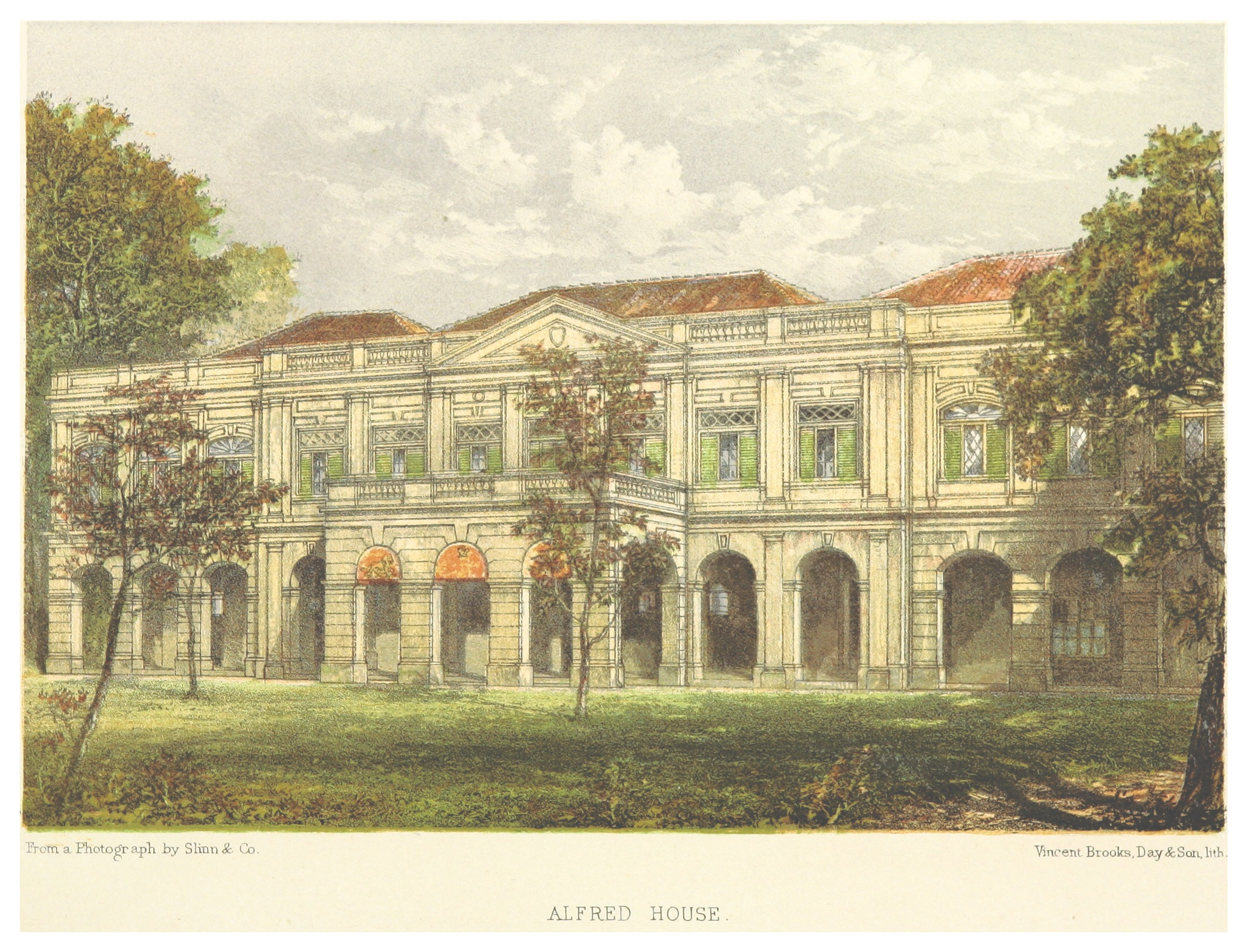
Charles Henry de Soysa residence in Colombo Alfred House.

De Soysa was accorded the unique privilege of being invited to hold a reception on behalf of the people of Ceylon for Prince Alfred, Duke of Edinburgh who was the first member of British Royalty to visit the Island. This he did in royal style at his palatial mansion in Colombo Bagatelle walauwa, (later renamed Alfred House) which had been specially reconstructed for the occasion in a sprawling park of 120 acres. De Soysa entertained the Prince where the crockery and cutlery of the banquet was made of gold and studded with gems and pearls. De Soysa extended the invitation to the elites as well as the commoners from all communities. Consequent to this event H.R.H. the Duke of Edinburgh hosted a reception to the De Soysas (at Queen's House, Colombo) and conferred the title of Gate Mudaliyar (Wasala Mudaliyar) on Susew de Soysa and of Justice of the Peace for the Island on Charles Henry de Soysa (the latter had declined the title of Mudaliyar).

== Philanthropy ==
=== Health ===
De Soysa initiated measures to reduce the infant mortality rate by creating a supply of trained Sinhalese midwives. He later became the first person in Asia to gift a maternity hospital; the De Soysa Lying-In-Home at Borella, which was once his childhood residence. The original buildings of the Ceylon Medical College gifted by him and his uncle Mudliyar Susew de Soysa were also declared open on the same day by the Governor Sir James Robert Longden on 9 December 1879.

The Lunawa Hospital Moratuwa, the Panadura hospital, Marawila hospital, Hanguranketha dispensary, the Ingiriya hospital and the Bacteriological Institute (Medical Research Institute) headed by the erudite Dr Aldo Castellani were also gifted by the de Soysa family. The Victoria Memorial Eye Hospital, the Lady Ridgeway Hospital for Children and the Ophthalmology Departments of the Kandy and Galle hospitals also benefited from the de Soysa generosity. On a visit to Great Britain in 1886, De Soysa gave liberally to 20 major hospitals including the Guy's Hospital London, Great Ormond Street Children's Hospital, Seamen's Hospital and the Royal Free Hospital. He also maintained a convalescent home at the Alfred House premises for the Buddhist clergy.

=== Education ===
De Soysa introduced a system of free education and scholarships in the schools he founded in his home-town; the Prince & Princes of Wales Colleges. A statue sculptured by Tissa Gunawardena was unveiled during the early 1980s at the College premises in Moratuwa. De Soysa lavished the then princely sum of Rs. 300,000 on the buildings alone, on a beautiful site of 15 acres bordering the Lunawa lagoon. The secular school catered to both genders of all walks of life as the mediums of instruction were English, the language of the elite as well as the vernacular (Sinhala), the native language of the masses. Two plantations were also endowed for its maintenance. The ceremonial opening was performed by Sir William Gregory, the Governor of Ceylon, on 14 September 1876 (along with the ceremonial opening of the St. John's Church and St. John's College Panadura built by Mudliyar Susew De Soysa). Princess of Wales' College was the first major attempt at imparting a secular education for girls in the country.

De Soysa's earliest contribution to education was the establishment of the Alfred Model Farm Agriculture School in 1871 and lavish grants to S. Thomas' College, Mutwal. He also facilitated his alma maters with the impetus for teaching science. The family also gifted land to Royal College, Colombo, now the University of Colombo sports grounds and for the inauguration of the Ceylon School for the Deaf and Blind, Ratmalana. as well as financing several building projects of Trinity College, Kandy. De Soysa gifted the first buildings of the Ceylon Medical College. He gave liberally to the National Museum of Colombo and other institutions throughout the island, including Jaffna, scholarships to individuals and also endowed several rural schools. De Soysa is considered a grandfather of free education. Lady De Soysa also patronised St. Sebastian's College and the Convent of Our Lady of Victories founded by her father.

De Soysa also extended his patronage to literary projects. He initiated and sponsored the translation, printing and publication of the Hitopadesha, works by the poet Kumaradasa and the Ven. Weligama Sri Sumangala Thero, including the publication of the 3rd standard reader. De Soysa also arranged educational charities through the Ven. Ratmalane Sri Dharmarama Thero, the Chief Incumbent of the Vidyalankara Pirivena.

=== Spiritual ===
At the request of the people of Lakshapathiya, De Soysa built the St. Mathias Church in Lakshapathiya. The foundation for this church was laid by the Rt. Revd. Hugh Willoughby Jermyn (3rd Bishop of Colombo) on 24 February 1872. The church was consecrated on St. Matthias’ Day, 24 February 1876 by the Rt. Revd. Dr. Reginald Stephen Copleston (4th Bishop of Colombo).

De Soysa was a Life Warden of the Holy Emmanuel Church Moratuwa, built by his father, St. John's Church Panadura, built by his uncle, Saint Stephen's Church Marawila and the Holy Emmanuel Church, Hanguranketha, built by him and his uncle. He was also a patron of the St. Sebastians Church Moratuwa, built by his father-in-law Chevalier Jusey de Silva who was also a chief contributor to St. Lucia's Cathedral, Colombo.

The Marawila Buddhist temple, Soysaramaya Moratuwa, Pothgul Viharaya Hanguranketh and grants to charities through the Ven. Ratmalane Sri Dharmarama Nayake Thero, the Chief Incumbent of the Vidyalankara Pirivena and the Ven. Weligama Sri Sumangala Mahanayake Thero are examples of the patronage extended to Buddhism. De Soysa also maintained a convalescent home at his Alfred House estate for the Buddhist clergy. Hindu and Islamic institutions also benefited from this generosity, a testimony to the broad-minded religious outlook.

=== Other welfare activities ===
De Soysa set up measures to improve agricultural productivity and the dairy industry in the country. In 1871 he inaugurated the Alfred Model Farm Experimental Station and Agricultural School at Borella and Narahenpita to conduct research into farming methods and to promote agricultural innovations. He also introduced new species of crops and livestock and provided teaching and residential facilities. The sum of 10,000 Pound Sterling and 160 acres (0.65 km^{2}) of land was set apart for this project. It was declared open on 31 December 1871 by Governor Sir Hercules Robinson. The Board of Directors included George Henry Kendrick Thwaites, the Superintendent of the Peradeniya Botanical Gardens. However, as the project was less than successful most of the land was later utilized for the Royal Colombo Golf Course and the remainder for extending the Colombo General Cemetery and the Castle Street Hospital. The family also gifted the De Soysa Stadium.

De Soysa presented the Royal Institution and museums with archaeological antiquities purchased at the Colonial and Indian Exhibition including a facsimile of the Yapahuwa gate. He constructed the Lunawa road from Galle road to Lunawa and the bridge across the lagoon. He also had the Katubedda road (Moratuwa) constructed and donated land and money to build the Lunawa Railway Station. He established a Co-operative Society for carpenters and craftsmen in Moratuwa and gave land for resettlement to over a hundred displaced families of Walapane evicted for non-payment of the grain tax and was one of the largest contributors to the Indian and Irish famine funds. When the colonial authorities introduced the Poll Tax (which could not be paid by the many thousands of poor people in Moratuwa, at the time consisting the third largest population in Ceylon), De Soysa paid the sums involved on behalf of all the townfolk. De Soysa is reputed to have given far more in private benefactions than his known public benefactions.

== Socio-political activity ==
On 11 November 1871, Ceylon's first mass political meeting was held on the grounds of the De Soysa walauwa in Moratuwa agitating against the discriminatory provisions of the Village Councils Ordinance 1871, to uphold the dignity of minority groups and to oppose the colonial policy of divide and rule. De Soysa's name headed the petition signed by 1000 persons from Moratuwa and Dehiwala-Mount Lavinia requesting the Governor to amendment the Ordinance and to print it in the native language.

On 24 June 1881 the Ceylon Agricultural Association was formed to safeguard the interests of the native enterprises facing stiff competition from the Europeans and to limit their control of the economic activities of the country. It also inaugurated a movement to abolish the paddy tax. De Soysa was the Founder-President of the Ceylon Agricultural Association which later transformed itself into the Ceylon National Association in 1888 and subsequently played a significant role in the struggles for constitutional reforms in the early part of the twentieth century with such celebrities as Sir James Peiris as President and D. R. Wijewardena as Secretary. The Ceylon National Association paved the way for the rise of the Ceylon National Congress, which in turn played a decisive role along with the Lanka Sama Samaja Party in the penultimate lap on the road to independence. The Ceylon Standard and the Ceylon Morning Leader newspapers, owned by the de Soysa family powerfully molded the public opinion when it was under the editorship of Armand de Souza.

== Death ==
De Soysa was bitten by a rabid dog that strayed into Alfred House on 2 August 1890. It was originally decided to remove him to Paris for treatment, but he opted to remain in Ceylon and obtain native treatment. He died of rabies on 29 of September 1890. As per his wishes, he was buried outside the Holy Emmanuel Church in the graveyard next to his son who had died in his infancy. His mortal remains were laid to rest amidst a gathering described as the largest in the nineteenth century.

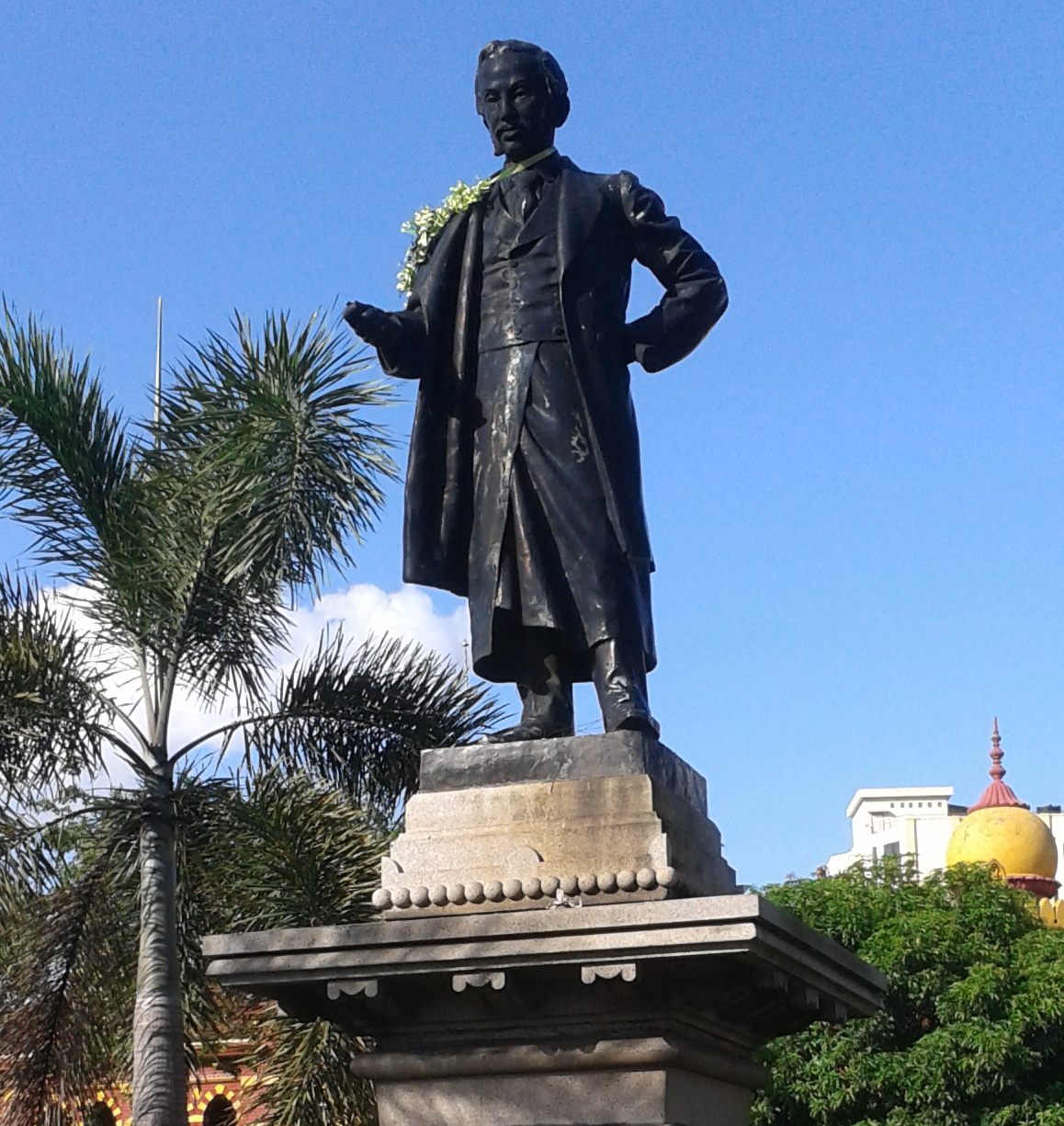
De Soysa's statue at De Soysa Circus Colombo, erected in 1919 by public subscription was the first of a native in Ceylon.

== Honors ==
In addition to be appointed a Justice of the peace by Duke of Edinburgh, following his sudden death, his widow, became the first Sinhalese to be granted the use of the courtesy title of Lady and was known as Lady de Soysa, as a widow of a Knight Bachelor of the realm, with its style and precedence in February 1892.

== Legacy ==
De Soysa, the far sighted native entrepreneur and philanthropist played the role of a paternal figure in 19th century Ceylon. He was the first Ceylonese since the days of the Sinhalese kings to build and equip a complete hospital. He introduced a system of free education long before the state took on that responsibility. The example he set in philanthropy is unique in our annals; he catered from the womb to the tomb. In contrast to the latter day culture where institutions built by public funds, foreign gifts or collected through charities are named after individuals, particularly politicians, most institutions pioneered by De Soysa's personal wealth and foresight were in fact not named after himself. He was a public man of the first degree. The first steps towards a formation of a political process which later opened up the possibility of negotiating legislative reforms, self governance and independence were initiated with the stand taken by Mr. De Soysa and others. All the major political parties in Sri Lanka, with the exception of the Marxist and communalist parties can trace their origins even partly to the Ceylon Agricultural Association. De Soysa was far ahead of his times in understanding the importance of the economic, social and moral progress in the process of nation building.

== Family ==
He married Catherine de Silva (1845 - 1914), the only child of Chevalier Lindamulage Jusey de Silva, KSG and Weerahennadi Weerabala Jayasuriya Patabendige Anna Fernando on 4 February 1863. They had eight sons and seven daughters; J. W. C de Soysa, Hon. A. J. R. de Soysa of Lakshmigiri, E. L. F. de Soysa, T. H. A. de Soysa of Regina Walauwa, J. S. W. de Soysa, Sir Wilfred de Soysa and R. E. S. de Soysa who were phillanthrophists in their own right. Famous sons-in law include Sir Marcus Fernando, Charles Matthew Fernando, Dr Solomon Fernando, Dr. W. H. de Silva, Francis Perera-Abeywardena of Closenberg and Louis H. S. Pieris of Whist Bungalow. Famous grandchildren include Bishop Harold de Soysa, cricketer Ryle de Soysa. labour unionist and campaigner for universal suffrage, Chevalier C.H.Z. Fernando and Loranee Senaratne, the island's first Ambassadress. Other relatives include Metropolitan Bishop Lakdasa De Mel, Sir Henry De Mel, J. L. D. Peiris, Wilmot A. Perera, Sir James Peiris, Apollonia de Soysa, Professor Indra de Soysa, Flying Officer Chinthaka de Soysa, and golfer Amrith de Soysa.
