= Department of Commerce and Management Studies =

Department Of Commerce And Management Studies may refer to:

- a department in Indian Institute of Management Kozhikode
- a department in University of Calicut, Malappuram, India
- a department in Andhra University
- former name of Faculty of Management and Finance, University of Colombo
