= Senaratne =

Senaratne is a surname. Notable people with the surname include:

- Akash Senaratne (born 1996), Sri Lankan cricketer
- Chathura Senaratne (born 1982), Sri Lankan politician
- Indika Senaratne (born 1986), Sri Lankan cricketer
- Loranee Senaratne (1913-2004), Sri Lankan diplomat
- Nipuna Senaratne (born 1993), English cricketer
- Rajitha Senaratne (born 1950), Sri Lankan dentist and politician
- Sisira Senaratne (1935–2015), Sri Lankan singer
