= King George Hall, Colombo =

King George Hall
- KGH
- Owner: University of Colombo
- Type: Theatre
- Events: Music, Concerts, Theatre, Dance

The King George Hall (KGH) of the University of Colombo in Colombo is one of the oldest theatres of Sri Lanka. Built during the mid-1920s following the establishment of the University College Colombo, it was meant to function as a theatre, lecture hall, and venue for many university functions, a purpose it serves to this day.
