= Faculties and institutions of University of Colombo =

The University of Colombo currently has seven faculties with 41 academic departments and two interdependent schools with five academic departments. All faculties and schools carries out courses of study and research in both graduate and undergraduate studies. In addition, the university has several institutions that specialize in different areas of research.

== Faculties & Institutions ==
Founding of Faculties & Institutions of the University of Colombo
| Faculty | Year founded |
| Faculty of Medicine | 1942 |
| Faculty of Science | 1942 |
| Faculty of Arts | 1942 |
| Faculty of Law | 1967 |
| Faculty of Education | 1973 |
| Faculty of Graduate Studies | 1987 |
| Faculty of Management and Finance | 1994 |
| Sri Palee Campus | 1996 |
| School of Computing | 2002 |
| Faculty of Technology | 2017 |
| Faculty of Nursing | 2017 |
| Faculty of Indigenous Medicine | 2023 |

=== Faculty of Medicine (1942) ===
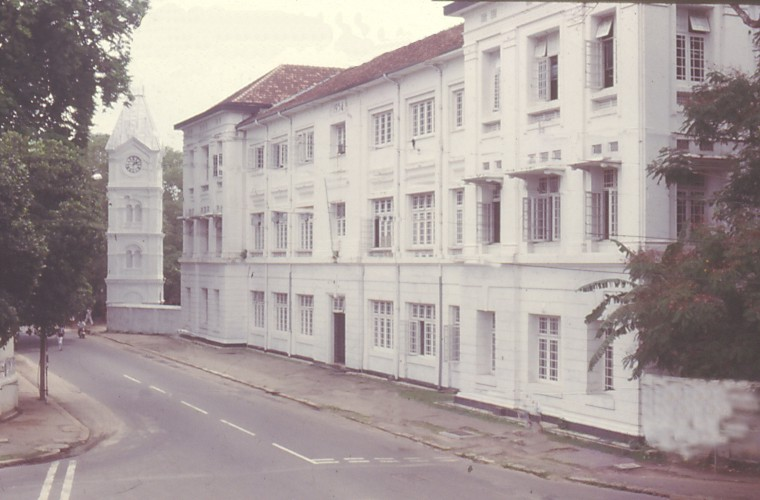
The Faculty of Medicine building and the Koch Memorial Clock Tower on Kynsey Road.

The Faculty of Medicine is the oldest faculty of the university and oldest medical school in Sri Lanka. Established in 1870 as the Colombo Medical School later renamed as the Colombo Medical College, it was integrated as a faculty of the University of Ceylon at its formation in 1942. The Faculty has close links with several hospitals for teaching, training, clinical services and research. These include;

- The National Hospital of Sri Lanka (Colombo General Hospital)
- De Soysa Maternity Hospital
- Castle Street Maternity Hospital
- Lady Ridgeway Hospital for Children

Departments of the Faculty of Medicine

- Department of Anatomy
- Department of Biochemistry and Molecular Biology
- Department of Clinical Medicine
- Department of Community Medicine
- Department of Forensic Medicine and Toxicology
- Department of Microbiology
- Department of Obstetrics and Gynaecology
- Department of Paediatrics
- Department of Parasitology
- Department of Pathology
- Department of Pharmacology
- Department of Physiology
- Department of Physiotherapy
- Department of Psychological Medicine
- Department of Surgery

=== Faculty of Science (1942) ===
Faculty of science logo

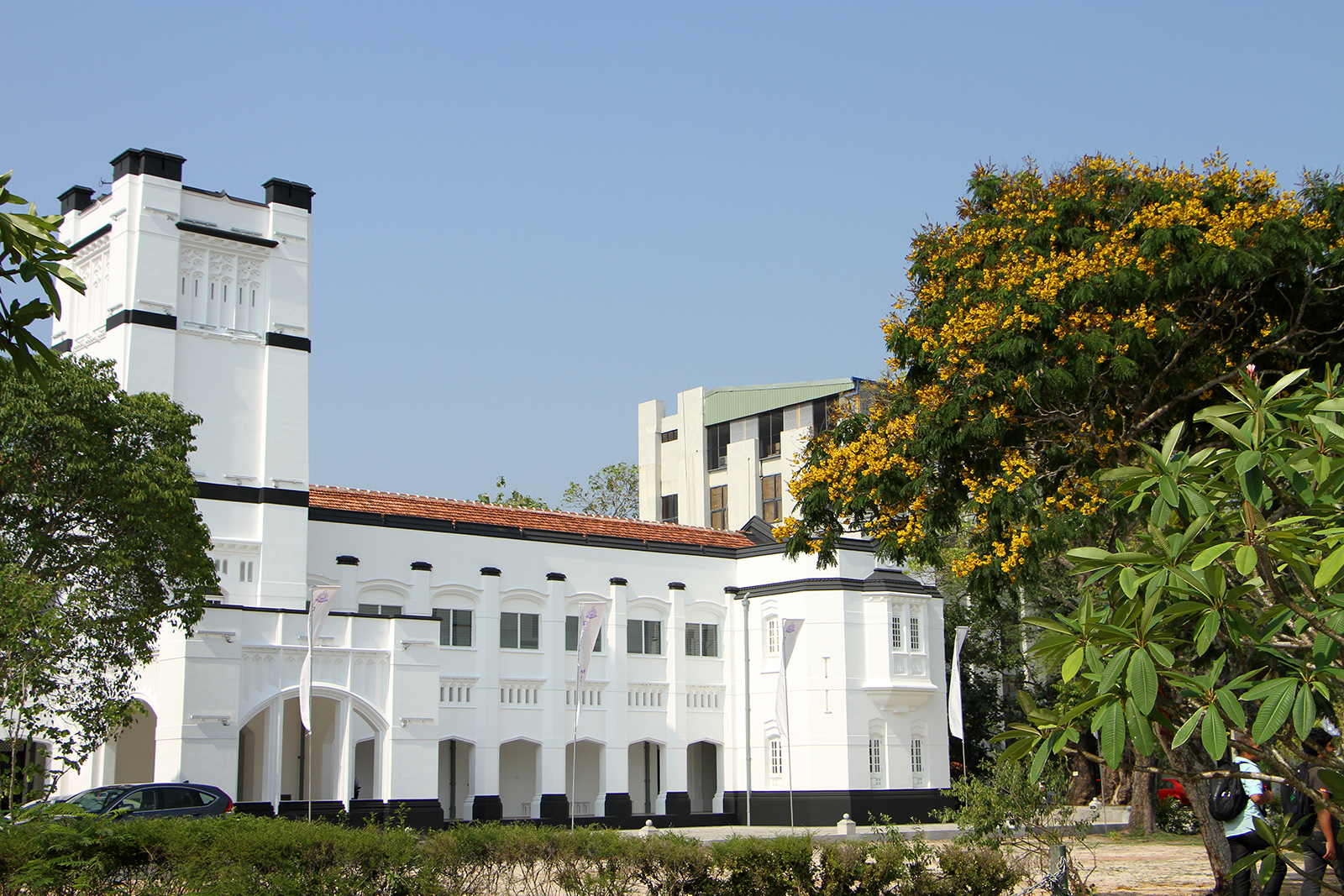
Landmark building of Department of Mathematics, Faculty of Science, University of Colombo

The Faculty of Science was established in 1942 with the founding the University of Ceylon. Part of the faculty was moved to Peradeniya, with other department remaining in Colombo. The faculty carries out research and studies chemistry, mathematics, nuclear science, physics, plant sciences, statistics and zoology. The oldest Faculty of Science in the country, it conducts both undergraduate and post-graduate degree programs in many fields of science.

Established in 1942 with the founding the University of Ceylon, as such it is one of the two oldest faculties in the island. At its formation its nucleus was formed from staff from the Science Section of the Ceylon Technical College. Part of the faculty was moved to Peradeniya, with other department remaining in Colombo. The faculty carries out research and studies Chemistry, Mathematics, Nuclear science, Physics, Plant Sciences, Statistics and Zoology.

Departments of the Faculty of Science

- Department of Chemistry
- Department of Mathematics
- Department of Physics
  - Centre for Instrument Development
- Department of Plant Science
- Department of Statistics
- Department of Zoology
- Department of Nuclear Science

=== Faculty of Arts (1942) ===
In terms of student population the Faculty of Arts is the largest faculty in of the University of Colombo. Made up of ten academic departments and several teaching units, it undertakes studies and research in areas of humanities and social sciences. The origins of the faculty dates back to 1921, with the establishment of the Ceylon University College, as courses in arts subjects where the first to be started. Upgraded to a faculty in 1942 with the establishment of the University of Ceylon that year, it was moved completely to Peradeniya in the early 1950s. In 1963, a new arts faculty was established in Colombo as part of the University of Ceylon, Colombo campus which continues to function as the current faculty.

Departments of the Faculty of Arts

- Department of Demography
- Department of Economics
- Department of English
- Department of English Language Teaching
- Department of Geography
- Department of History and International Relations
- Department of Journalism
- Department of Sinhala
- Department of Sociology
- Department of Political Science and Public Policy

=== Faculty of Law (1967) ===
The Faculty of Law originated as the Department of Law in Colombo within the University of Ceylon in July 1947 under the Faculty of Arts. It was relocated to Peradeniya in 1950 and remained part of the Faculty of Arts. In 1965, the Department of Law was moved back to Colombo, and in 1967 it was upgraded to become Sri Lanka’s first and to this day only faculty of law within the university system. The Faculty maintains close links with the Sri Lanka Law College, which administers the law examinations required for admission as an Attorney-at-Law. As the country’s oldest law faculty and the only one of its kind in the university system, it offers both undergraduate and postgraduate degree programmes in law.

=== Faculty of Education (1973) ===
The Faculty of Education was established in 1973, followed by the merger of Departments of Education of the Peradeniya, Vidyodaya and Vidyalankara that had been brought back to Colombo. However it traces it roots to 1949 when the Department of Education was founded in Colombo before it move to Peradeniya. It has become the primary center of undergraduate and postgraduate studies and research in education.

Departments of the Faculty of Education

- Department of Humanities Education
- Department of Educational Psychology
- Department of Social Science Education
- Department of Science and Technology Education

=== Faculty of Graduate Studies (1987) ===
The Faculty of Graduate Studies (FGS) is a graduate school it conducts post-graduate degree programs in many fields, via on campus lectures and distance learning. It has the largest number of distance learning course offered via e-learning and m-learning with a student base in both Sri Lanka and the Maldives. It was established by the Faculty of Graduate Studies Ordinance No. 03 of 1987.

=== Faculty of Management and Finance (1994) ===
The Faculty of Management and Finance traces it roots to the establishment of the Department of Commerce and Management Studies which was later upgraded to a faculty made up of six academic departments in 1994. Studies into accounting, business economics, finance, human resource management, management, organization studies and marketing. Its Postgraduate & Mid-career Development Unit which conducts the highly recognized MBA program of the Colombo University.

Departments of the Faculty of Management and Finance

- Department of Accounting
- Department of Business Economics
- Department of Finance
- Department of Human Resource Management
- Department of Management Studies
- Department of Marketing

=== Sri Palee Campus (1996) ===
The Sri Palee Campus of the University of Colombo is located in Wewala, Horana. Established in 1996 it conducts courses in the field of performing arts and mass media. It was established by a notification of the Sri Lanka government gazette (Extraordinary ) No 928/1 dated June 20, 1996. The campus is located in buildings and land donated to the University of Sri Lanka by the Sri Palee Trust in memory of Hon Wilmot A. Perera. The Sri Palee Trust was established by Wilmot A. Perera with his personal lands. The campus is due to expand into two faculties with five academic departments.

Departments of the Sri Palee Campus

- Department of Performing Arts
- Department of Mass Media

=== University of Colombo School of Computing (2002) ===
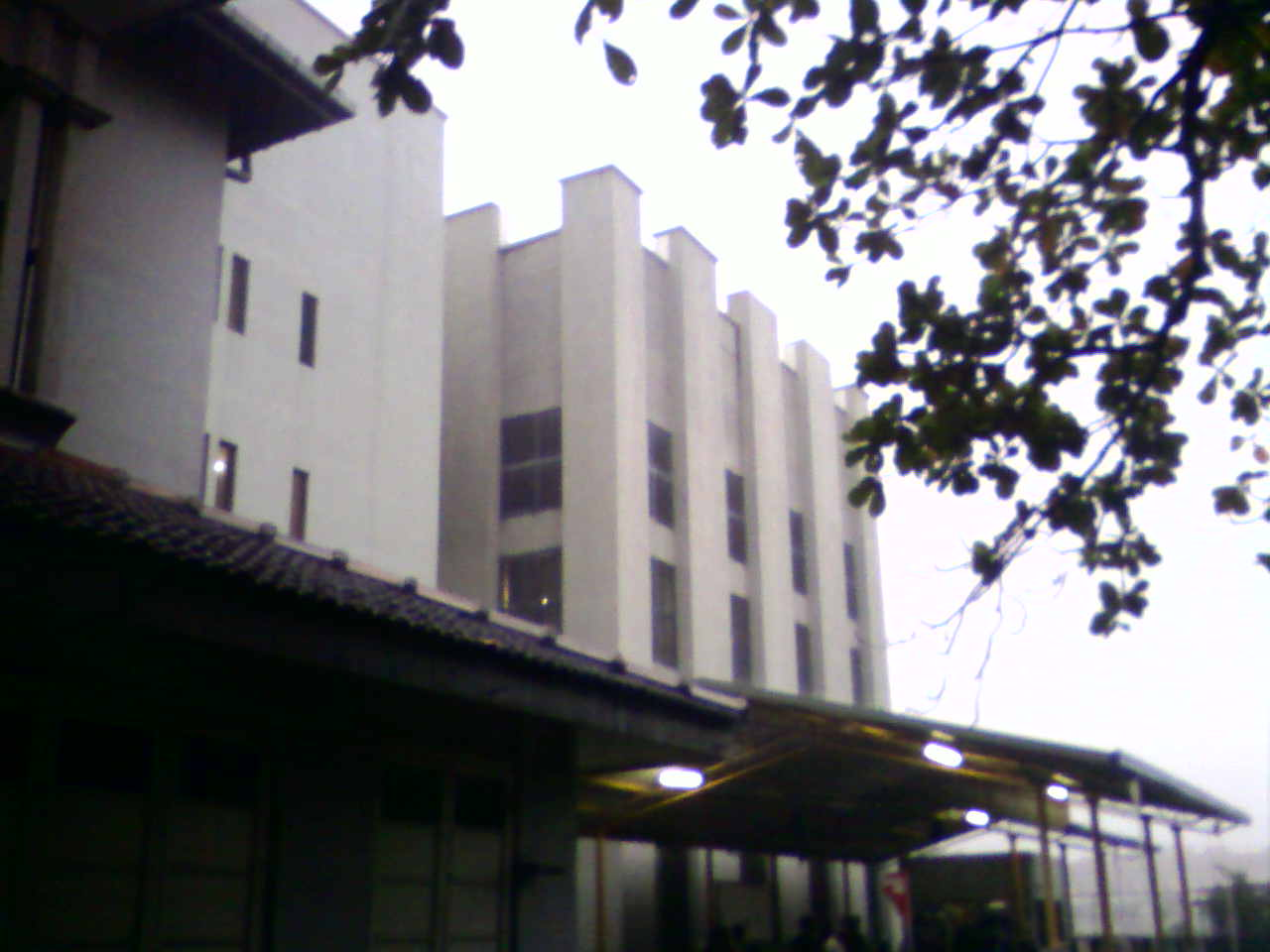
Main building of the UCSC

The University of Colombo School of Computing (UCSC) is a higher educational affiliate institute providing undergraduate and postgraduate education in Computer Science, Information Systems, and Information and Communication Technology. The UCSC was formed on 1 September 2002 with the argumentation of the Department of Computer Science of the Faculty of Science of the University of Colombo and the Institute of Computer Technology by Professor V. K. Samaranayake. The institution conducts undergraduate and postgraduate degree programs in Computer Science, Software Engineering, Information Systems and IT

Departments of the University of Colombo School of Computing

- Department of Computation and Intelligent Systems
- Department of Communication and Media Technologies
- Department of Information Systems Engineering

Education centres include: the Advanced Digital Media Technology Centre, Computer Services Centre, Digital Forensic Centre, e-Learning Centre, External Degrees Centre, and the Professional Development Centre.

=== Faculty of Technology (2017) ===
The Faculty of Technology is one of the newer faculties to join the University of Colombo. Established in Homagama, Pitipana, in 2017, the Faculty of Technology of the University of Colombo is positioned to provide technological education to undergraduates seeking admission to the Faculty. Through the academic programs conducted by the departments of the Faculty, the students are trained as technology professionals with knowledge of existing technologies.

Departments of Faculty of Technology

- Department of Instrumentation & Automation Technology
- Department of Information & Communication Technology
- Department of Environmental Technology
- Department of Agricultural Technology

=== Faculty of Nursing (2017) ===
The Faculty of Nursing at the University of Colombo is the first-ever dedicated nursing faculty in Sri Lanka. It was established in 2017 through a government gazette notification. The faculty was inaugurated with support from the government of the Republic of Korea and Inje University, aiming to enhance the quality of nursing education in Sri Lanka.

==== Departments of Faculty of Nursing ====
- Department of Basic Science & Social Science for Nursing
- Department of Fundamental Nursing
- Department of Clinical Nursing

== Affiliated institutes ==
=== Postgraduate Institute of Medicine ===
The Postgraduate Institute of Medicine (PGIM) is the only graduate school in the country that provides specialist training of medical doctors. It was established in 1976 as the Institute of Postgraduate Medicine under the University of Ceylon Act No.1 of 1976 with Professor K. N. Seneviratne its first director, it was reorganized and given its current name under the Postgraduate Institute of Medicine Act No.1 of 1980.

=== National Institute of Library & Information Sciences ===
The National Institute of Library & Information Sciences (NILIS) is a graduate school that focus on the study and research of library science, information management, and allied fields. It was established in 1999 by an ordinance under section 18 and 24 of the Universities Act No. 16 of 1978 as an institution affiliated to the University of Colombo.

=== Institute of Biochemistry, Molecular Biology and Biotechnology ===
The Institute of Biochemistry, Molecular Biology and Biotechnology (IBMBB) is the Sri Lankan node for the European Molecular Biology Network. It is also designated as a resource centre for molecular life sciences by the international program in chemical sciences, University of Uppsala.

=== Institute of Indigenous Medicine ===
The Institute of Indigenous Medicine specialize in the study of the form of ayurvedic medicine, which has been practiced in the island for over two thousand years. It is located in Nawala a suburb of Colombo.

=== Institute of Human Resource Advancement ===
The Institute of Human Resource Advancement, formerly the Institute of Workers Education provide access to education and lifelong learning for adults. It conducts studies in many areas that is part of adult education.

=== Institute of Agro Technology and Rural Science ===
The Institute of Agro Technology and Rural Science is an affiliated institute of for the UoC, located in Hambantota in the Southern Province of the country.

== Former Institutes & entities ==
- Institute of Computer Technology (ICT) (now functioning as the School of Computing)
- Institute of Workers Education (now Institute of Human Resource Advancement)
- Department of Architecture (now Faculty of Architecture, University of Moratuwa)
