= Charles Matthew Fernando =

Charles Matthew Fernando (1866 – 9 June 1909) was a Ceylonese lawyer and scholar. He was the first Ceylonese Crown Counsel.

== Early life and education ==
Charles Matthew Fernando was born in 1866 in Colombo, the son of Andrew Fernando Jr. and the grandson of Andrew Fernando Sr., the Mudaliyer of Colombo. He was the brother of Sir Marcus Fernando.

Educated at the St Benedicts Academy (later known as St Benedict's College Colombo) and at Royal College, Colombo, where he won the Turnour Prize, Shakespeare Prize and the Junior Cambridge Scholarship. Taking his matriculation, he was the first Ceylonese student to pass the Intermediate in Arts of the University of London. He attended St John's College, Cambridge where he completed law tripos in 1886 gaining a BA and LLB degrees, he was called to the bar as a barrister from the Lincoln's Inn in 1888.

== Legal career ==
On his return to Ceylon in 1889, he was enrolled as an Advocate and started his legal practice. In 1897, he was appointed acting District Judge of Kurunagala and thereafter moved to Kandy as Crown Advocate. In 1901, he was appointed Acting Crown Counsel, Colombo and was confirmed in 1903. He led the prosecution in many of the major criminal cases including the Attygalle murder case. He served as the Senior Crown Counsel and Assistant Attorney General of Ceylon. He was one of the founders of the Ceylon Law Students Union.

He was also a member of the Colombo Municipal Council, the Kandy Municipal Council and the Road Committee of the Western province.

== Academic career ==
In 1908 he made English translations of the Rajaveliya and the Nikaya Sangarava. C. M. Fernando's writings are some of the oldest written accounts on the subject of Ceylonese dance music forms such as baila.

== Family ==
Fernando married Jane Maria Caroline, third daughter of Charles Henry de Soysa and Lady de Soysa in 1901. They had a daughter and a son, Chevalier C.H.Z. Fernando, the pioneer labour unionist Councillor who was responsible for submitting a motion in the Legislative Council of Ceylon to abolish the Poll Tax in 1922 and co-founded the Young Lanka League (1915) and the Ceylon Labour Party, being the only Ceylonese to have met Lenin, His wife and daughter Christobel, were notably the only two among the urbanised elite to be in saree for their portrait in the Twentieth Century Impressions of Ceylon by Arnold Wright.

Fernando died on 9 June 1909 in Béziers, France.
