= C. H. Z. Fernando =

Hon. Charles Hubert Zaleski Fernando
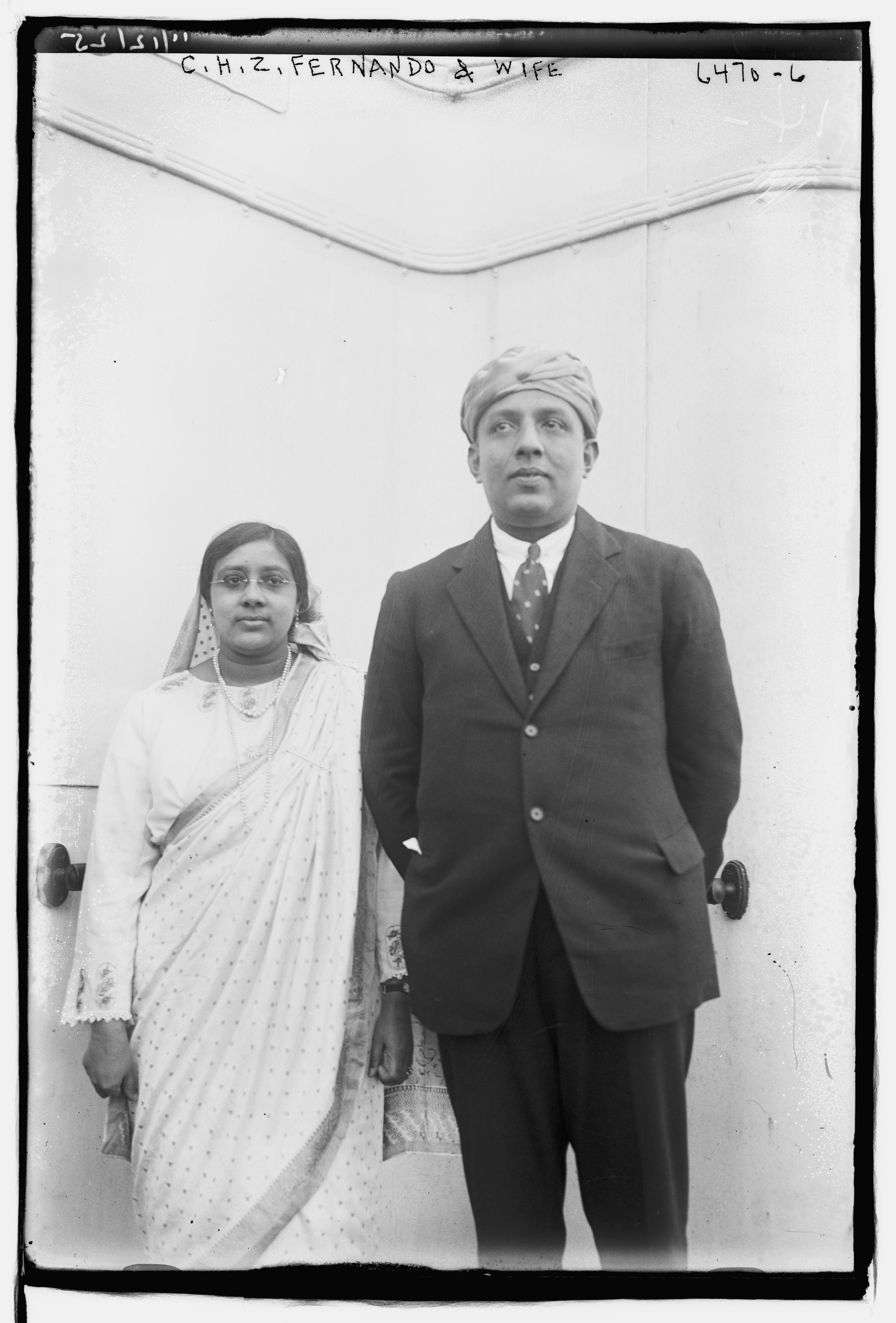

Member of the Legislative Council of Ceylon
- In office 1924–1929

Personal details
- Party: Ceylon Labour Party
- Spouse: Daisy M. née Fernando
- Relations: R. A. de Mel
- Children: P. C. S. Fernando
- Education: University of Cambridge
- Profession: Advocate

Charles Hubert Zaleski Fernando (18 November 1892 - 5 July 1973) was a Ceylonese lawyer and colonial era politician. He was a member of the Legislative Council of Ceylon and the Colombo Municipal Council.

== Early life and education ==
Fernando was born to Charles Matthew Fernando, a Crown Counsel and Jane Maria Caroline, third daughter of Charles Henry de Soysa, Sir Marcus Fernando was his uncle. He was educated at St. Joseph's College, Colombo and Royal College, Colombo before proceeding to the United Kingdom of Great Britain and Ireland in 1907. There, he was drawn to the activities of the Sinn Féin and had met Lenin at party meetings. Having graduated from the University of Cambridge in 1913, with a BA and a LLB, on his return to Ceylon, Fernando became an Advocate.

== Business career ==
He soon took to business with holdings in tea and rubber plantations, plumbago (graphite) mining and shipping, which he consolidated in the holding company C. H. Z. Fernando & Co. In 1928 he became the owner of the Mount Lavinia Hotel. He was the Chairmen of the Ceylon Import Merchants Association and a member of the Low-Country Products Association.

== Political career ==
He became a founding member of the radical political association named Young Lanka League in 1915 and together with A. E. Gunasinha, E. A. P. Wijerathne, A. P. Thambayah and Valentine S. Perera, going on to form the Workers’ Welfare League in 1919. In the same year he became a co-founder of the Ceylon National Congress. In the Municipal Council he presented the motion to repeal the Poll tax, which lead to its repeal in 1922. He was elected to the Legislative Council of Ceylon in 1924 from Chilaw as the member for the Western division of the North-western province defeating Charles Edgar Corea. He was a founder of the Ceylon Labour Party in 1928 and in July 1928 he along with A. E. Gunasinha represented Ceylon at the British Empire Labour Conference in London. Fernando was a strong campaigner for universal suffrage including for the plantation Tamils, which was introduced by the Donoughmore Constitution in 1931. Between 1920 and 1941, he was elected as a member of the Colombo Municipal Council for Kotahena and served as Chairman of the Ceylon Coconut Board, the Rubber Research Board and the Plumbago Trade Wages Board. He was made a Chevalier of the Order of the Holy Sepulchre.

== Family ==
He married Daisy M. Fernando daughter of Hettikandage Bastian Fernando, their sons were P. C. S. Fernando and Chitra Bhanu Fernando R. A. de Mel was their brother-in-law.
