= St Matthias' Church, Lakshapathiya =

Church in Lakshapathiya, Moratuwa, Sri Lanka

St Matthias’ Church
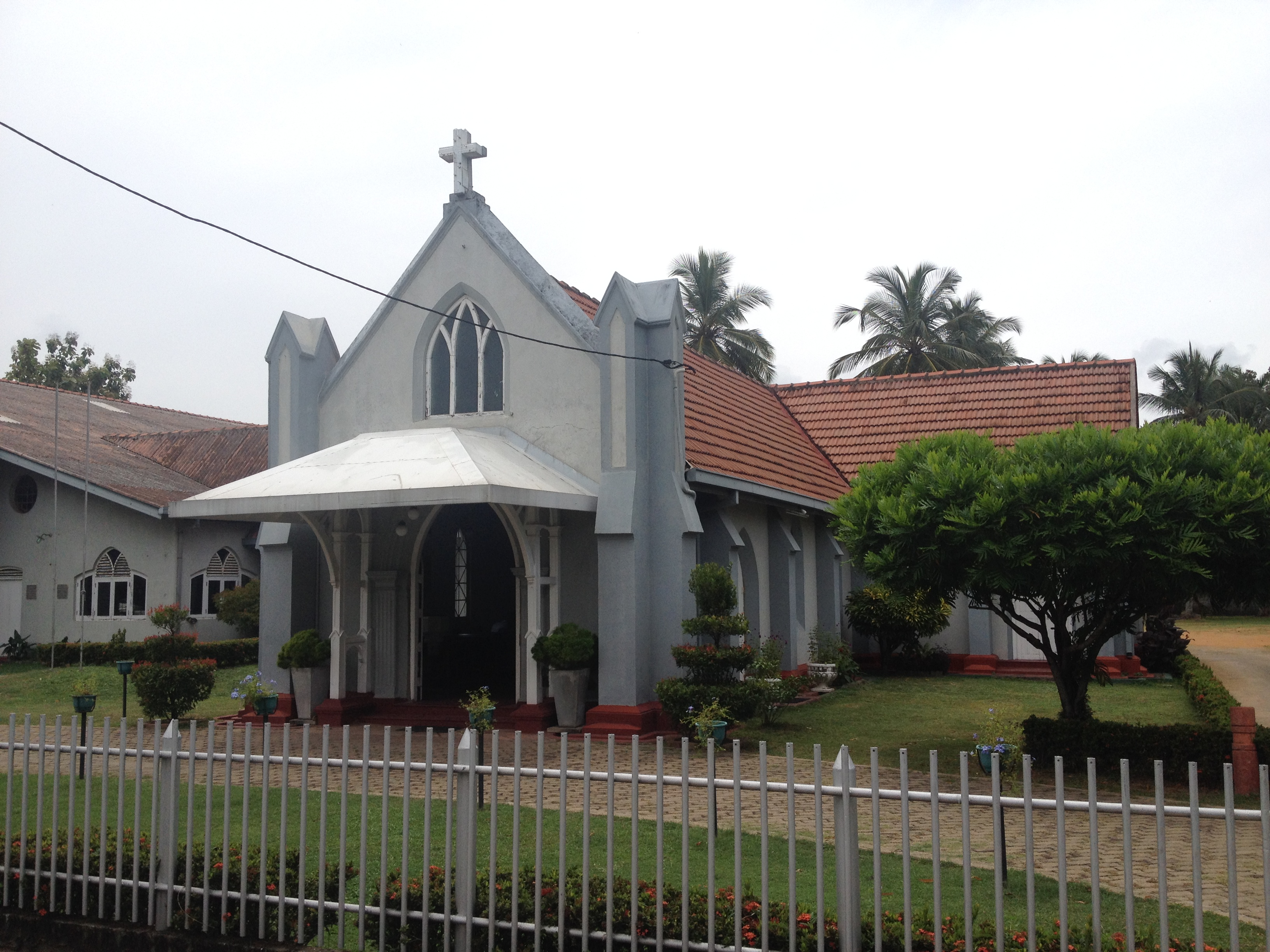

Religion
- Affiliation: Anglican
- District: Colombo
- Province: Western Province
- Year consecrated: 26 February 1876; 150 years ago
- Status: Active

Location
- Location: Lakshapathiya, Moratuwa, Sri Lanka
- Interactive map of St Matthias’ Church
- Coordinates: 06°47′57.1″N 79°52′41.4″E

Architecture
- Type: Church
- Founder: Charles Henry de Soysa
- Groundbreaking: 24 February 1872
- Completed: 1875

St Matthias’ Church, is a church in Moratuwa in Sri Lanka. The church is located in Lakshapathiya approximately 1.1 km (0.68 mi) away from the Soysapura junction on Colombo-Galle main road (A2). It was consecrated on 24 February 1876 (St. Matthias’ Day) by Reginald Stephen Copleston, the fourth Bishop of Colombo.

== History ==
The first church school in Lakshapathiya was opened in 1849, and the school building was used as the place for the church services on Sunday. In 1861, there was an idea to establish a church in Lakshapathiya when Abraham Mendis was appointed as the colonial Chaplain for Moratuwa area. After a few years, Mendis conceived the idea of having a day school festival and at that time there were only two schools namely Rawatawatte School and Laxapathiya School. On 15 December 1869 the school festival was taken place and at the occasion Charles Henry de Soysa, a Ceylonese entrepreneur and philanthropist, agreed to assist in building a new church for the village.

The foundation stone for the church in Lakshapthiya was laid on 24 February 1872 by Hugh Willoughby Jermyn, the third Bishop of Colombo. A bottle containing different coins of Ceylon and an inscription engraved on a metal plate were also laid with the foundation stone. The occasion was attended by the chaplain Mendis, Rev. J. Bacon, Mudaliyar Susew de Soysa, and de Soysa. By the end of 1875 the construction work was completed and the church was consecrated on 24 February 1876, St. Matthias’ Day, by the Bishop of Colombo, Reginald Stephen Copleston.

== See also ==
- Christianity in Sri Lanka
