= Colombo University Observatory =

Astronomical observatory at the University of Colombo

Coordinates: 6°54′05″N 79°51′41″E

The Colombo University Observatory is the astronomical observatory located at the University of Colombo. Formally the Colombo Observatory it is a permanently mounted telescope with its own observatory dome located on the university grounds next to Reid Avenue in Colombo. The observatory is used by the Mathematical and Astronomical Society.

The telescope is a 12½-inch (32 cm) Newtonian reflector solidly fixed on a polar mount. This is housed in an observatory with a rotating hemispherical dome moving on rollers. Established in the 1920s, it was disused during the 1940s and 1950s after it was taken over by the RAF during World War II and damaged. It was put back into use in the early 1960s. The telescope was fully operational until the late 1980s when its components were stolen during the 1987–89 Insurrection. Since then attempts have been made for its restoration.

== See also ==
- Arthur C. Clarke Institute for Modern Technologies
- Percy B. Molesworth
