= Ceylon Journal of Science =

- Discipline: Multidisciplinary
- Language: English
- Edited by: S.H.P. Parakrama Karunaratne

Publication details
- Former names: Ceylon Journal of Science (Biological Sciences), Ceylon Journal of Science (Physical Sciences)
- History: 1924–present
- Publisher: University of Peradeniya (Sri Lanka)
- Frequency: Quarterly
- Open access: Yes

Standard abbreviations
- ISO 4: Ceylon J. Sci.

Indexing
- ISSN: 2513-2814 (print); 2513-230X (web)

Links
- Journal homepage

The Ceylon Journal of Science is a peer-reviewed open access scientific journal established in 1924 by the Government of Ceylon. The journal was the result of the merger of Annals of the Royal Botanic Gardens, Peradeniya, Spolia Zeylanica, and Bulletin of the Ceylon Fisheries. The journal had several sections, covering different fields, but now consists of a single quarterly publication.

In 1942, the University of Peradeniya took over the publication, and Spolia Zeylanica reverted to a separate publication. In 1958, sections A, B, and C (together covering botany, zoology, and fishery) merged to form Ceylon Journal of Science (Biological Sciences) while sections E and F (together covering mathematics, physics, meteorology, and chemistry) merged to form Ceylon Journal of Science (Physical Sciences). Section D was renamed to Ceylon Journal of Medical Science in 1965 and is now published by the University of Colombo. Section G (covering anthropology, archaeology and ethnology) ceased publication in 1954.

The Ceylon Journal of Science (Biological Sciences) and the Ceylon Journal of Science (Physical Sciences) were amalgamated in 2016 and is now being published as the Ceylon Journal of Science, regaining its original name when founded in 1924. The new journal continues to be a University of Peradeniya journal published quarterly in electronic and print versions, and administered by the Faculty of Science. It caters research articles from different scientific disciplines under five themes; Chemistry; Earth and Environment; Mathematics, Statistics & IT; Life Sciences and Physics.
