= Ceylon Journal of Medical Science =

- Discipline: Medical sciences
- Language: English
- Edited by: R.L. Jayakody, Senaka Rajapakse

Publication details
- History: 1924–present
- Publisher: University of Colombo (Sri Lanka)
- Open access: Yes

Standard abbreviations
- ISO 4: Ceylon J. Med. Sci.

Indexing
- ISSN: 0011-2232
- OCLC no.: 682095416

Links
- Journal homepage; Online access; Online archive

The Ceylon Journal of Medical Science is a peer-reviewed medical journal that started out as Section D of the Ceylon Journal of Science, which was first published in 1924 by the Government of Ceylon. It obtained its current name in 1965 and is now being published by the University of Colombo. The journal publishes articles, reviews, original research, and case reports in medicine and medical sciences.
