= Old Royal College Building, Colombo =

Coordinates: 6.90484°N 79.86117°E

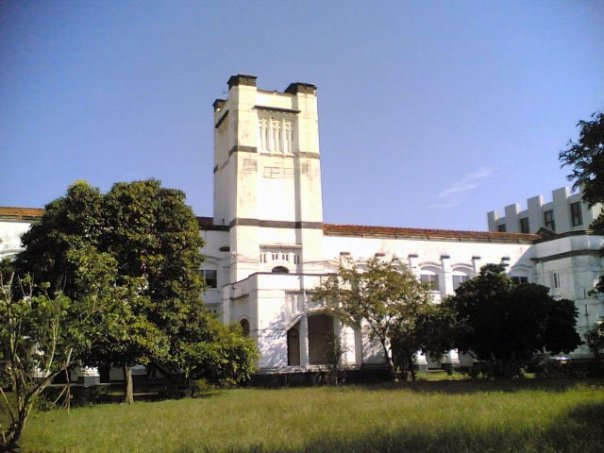
Old Royal College Building

Old Royal College Building is the main building of the University of Colombo. The iconic symbol of the University of Colombo, it is located on campus center in front of the university sports grounds, and presently houses the Department of Mathematics. Originally built in 1911 for the Royal College Colombo before it was transferred to the University College Colombo a year after its formation in 1921. Located behind the building is the King George Hall.

The foundation stone for a new building for the Royal College Colombo was laid by the Governor of Ceylon Sir Henry McCallum on 31 May 1911 and the college was transferred from its former location in Sebastian Hill on 27 August 1913.
