= A. J. R. de Soysa =

Ceylonese politician (1869–1939)

Hon. AJR de Soysa

Alfred Joseph Richard de Soysa (15 February 1869 – 1939) was a Ceylonese landed proprietor and politician. He was a member of the Legislative Council of Ceylon.

== Early life and education ==
He was the second of eight sons of Sir Charles Henry de Soysa and Lady Catherine de Soysa. He was born at Brodie House, Bambalapitya and educated at S. Thomas' College, Prince of Wales' College and Royal College and completed his education at Highbury House School St Leonards-on-Sea, where he excelled as a sprinter and pursued a degree in music at Trinity Hall, Cambridge.

== Career ==
Following his father's unexpected death in August 1890, de Soysa returned to Ceylon to manage his father's extensive tea, rubber and coconut estates. In 1898 he was appointed to the Colombo Harbor Board and in 1911 he became the second member to be appointed to the Low Country Sinhalese seat of the Legislative Council of Ceylon. He was appointed to the 'Salaries Commission of 1912' and paid workers from his private funds when the government refused to pay wages for the week-long railway strike.

De Soysa was a proprietor of the Ceylon Morning Leader newspaper.

== Family ==
On 4 February 1892 he married Mary Margaret de Silva of Henley House (now St. Bridget's Convent, Colombo). In 1895 he built the Chevaliar Jusey de Silva ward at the Lady Ridgeway Hospital for Children and in 1913 inaugurated the Ceylon School for the Deaf and Blind, Ratmalana. In 1910, he built the stately mansion Lakshmigiri.
