= Lunawa =

Coordinates: 06°47′23″N 79°52′28″E

Lunawa is a suburb in Sri Lanka lying on the coast just south of the capital, Colombo.

It is a suburb of Moratuwa in the Colombo District of the Western Province. The main sources of income in this city are carpentry and fishing. There are also two government schools and an international school in the city. Among them are St. Sebastian's College.Among the shrines in the Lunawa area are the trinity of Buddhist shrines: Sri Visuddharamaya, Sri Bodhirajaramaya, Sri Visuddhasramaya, as well as St. Peter and Paul's Church, Uyana Methodist Church and Uyana Anglican Church. The only hospital in Moratuwa is located in the Lunawa suburb.

== Transport ==
It is served by a station on the national railway network. 208 Bus route runs through Lunawa.

== See also ==
- Railway stations in Sri Lanka
