= Koch Memorial Clock Tower =

Clock tower at University of Colombo, Sri Lanka

Coordinates: 6.91912°N 79.87084°E

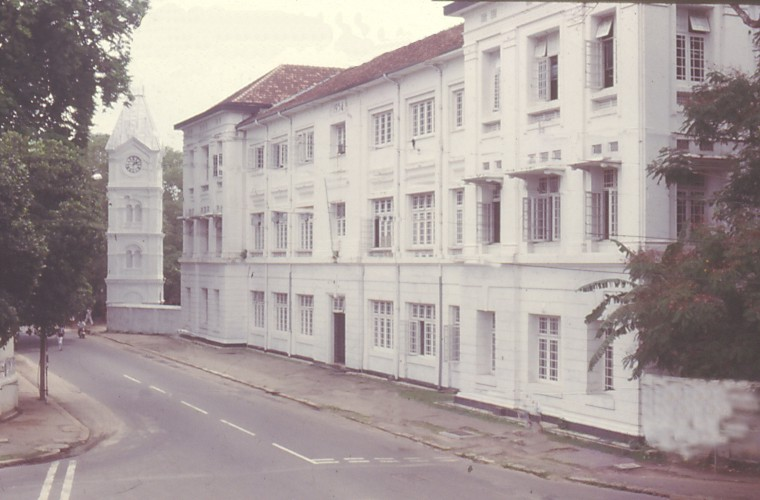
The Faculty of Medicine building and the Koch Memorial Clock Tower on Kynsey Road.

Koch Memorial Clock Tower (Sinhala: කොලඹ වෛද්‍ය පීඨ ඔරලෝසු කනුව), is located on Kynsey Road, Colombo next to the Faculty of Medicine of the University of Colombo. It was built in 1881 in memory of Dr. E. L. Koch (1838–1877), the second principal of the Colombo Medical School. It stands directly in front of the National Hospital of Sri Lanka.

Edwin Lawson Koch was born on 29 November 1838 in Jaffna, the son of John Godfried Koch, a local proctor and Angenita Dordthea Aldons. Koch originally qualified at the Bengal Medical College in Calcutta before obtaining his Doctorate in Medicine from the University of Aberdeen. In July 1862 he entered the Ceylon Medical Service and was a surgeon at the Colombo General Hospital (now known as the 'National Hospital'). Koch was one of the first lecturers at the Colombo Medical School when it opened in 1870 and succeeded Dr. James Loos as principal in 1875. On 20 December 1877 he died of sepsis from a wound he received whilst performing an autopsy, at the age of 39. He is recorded to have been "a bold surgeon, a successful physician and an expert obstetrician". Through the efforts of Dr. J. L. Vanderstraaten (one of the other lecturers at Colombo Medical School) Rs. 3,000 was raised by public subscription for the construction of a clock tower, with Sir James Longden, the Governor at the time, on behalf of the government, donating the clock, which cost Rs. 5,000.

The plaque on the clock tower carries the inscription: "In memory of E. L. Koch, M.D. Principal Medical College erected by public subscription and Civic Medical Officers 1881".

The clock and tower was restored by the descendants of E.L. Koch, Philippa and John E. Marrack.
