= Kumaratunga Munidasa Mawatha =

Street in Colombo, Sri Lanka

Kumaratunga Munidasa Mawatha (Sinhala:කුමාරතුංග මුනිදාස මාවත) (formally Thurstan Road) is a road in Colombo, Sri Lanka. Located in Cinnamon Gardens, it was named after Rev. J. Thurstan, a missionary from the Society for the Propagation of the Gospel. In the 1970s, it was renamed after the Sri Lankan poet Kumaratunga Munidasa.

It separates College House, Colombo from the main campus and sports grounds of the University of Colombo and it forms the western border of Royal College Colombo and its junior cricket grounds. The Senior Government School located on the road was named after the road as Thurstan College.

Located on Kumaratunga Munidasa Mawatha are India House, Colombo, Saifee Villa, the Geoffrey Bawa-designed house belonging to Upali Wijewardene (since been demolished) and the Flower Drum Chinese Restaurant.

A roundabout at the junction between Kumaratunga Munidasa Mawatha, Flower Road and Rajakeeya Mawatha was removed after Kumaratunga Munidasa Mawatha was made a one-way road in 2006. Located at this junction is the Ministry for Power and Energy. Since the late 1980s, this building and its grounds have housed the Joint Operations Command (JOC) of the Sri Lankan Armed Forces. In 1991, the LTTE detonated a van filled with explosives in a suicide bombing targeting the JOC.
