= S. C. Paul =

S. C. Paul MD FRCS
- Born: 28 February 1868
- Died: 1942
- Education: Jaffna Central College; Wesley College; S. Thomas' College; Madras Medical College; King's College London
- Occupation: Surgeon

Dr Samuel Chelliah Paul was a leading Ceylon Tamil surgeon.

== Early life ==
Paul was born on 28 February 1868. He was the son of Dr William Thillayampalam Paul, a physician and leading resident from Manipay in northern province of Ceylon. He had three brothers (Albert, Victor and Charles) and nine sisters (Thangamma, Annamma, Chellamma, Rasammah, Ratnamma, Pakiam, Muttamma, Nallamma and Nesammah). He was educated at Jaffna Central College, Wesley College, Colombo and S. Thomas' College, Mount Lavinia. He later passed his First in Arts Examination from Presidency College, Madras. He then went on to study medicine at Madras Medical College from where he obtained a first class MB BCh degree. Later he went to King's College London from where he obtained the FRCS qualification in 1901. He was the first Ceylonese to gain the FRCS qualification.

Paul married Dora Elenor, daughter of Dr Simon de Melho Aserappa, on 8 May 1899. They had seven sons (Milroy, William, Egerton, Albert, Jeyarajan, Arthur and Ellalasingam) and three daughters (Girlie Cooke, Amy Crosette-Thambiah and Tutse Rasaratnam).

== Career ==
Paul returned to Ceylon after obtaining his medical qualifications in the UK. He was appointed a lecturer in anatomy in 1902 and in 1905 he became a pathologist. In 1908 he was appointed a surgeon. Paul's reputation grew and he was appointed senior surgeon at the General Hospital, Colombo, a position he held until his retirement.

Paul was president of Ceylon Medical Association, president of the Royal Asiatic Society and chairman of the Ceylon Planters' Association. He was also a member of the Ceylon Medical Corps which he commanded between 1923 and 1927 as a lieutenant colonel. Paul and Justin Kotalawela founded the Ceylon Insurance Company. He and the De Vos family founded Colonial Motors. Paul died in 1942 aged 74.

The Sri Lanka Medical Association has honoured Paul by naming on its annual orations after him.
