= Aruppola =

Suburb of Kandy, Sri Lanka

Coordinates: 7°18′N 80°39′E

Aruppola is a suburb of Kandy, Sri Lanka. Aruppola is located about 4 kilometers from the heart of the Kandy City.

Aruppola is popular for its government-funded Technical College. The population of Aruppola consists of mostly middle-class families who work for both the government and the private sector. Arruppola shares a border with Mahaweli river, the longest river in Sri Lanka.

== Maps ==
- Aruppola in Sri Lanka road map
