= Ceylon University College =

Public university in Ceylon (1921–1942)

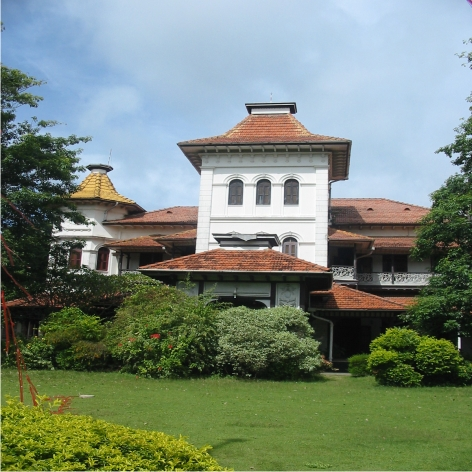
- Regina Walauwa, later renamed College House
- Type: Public
- Active: 24 January 1921–1 July 1942
- Affiliations: University of London
- Location: Colombo, Western Province, Ceylon; 06°53′59.90″N 79°51′31.80″E
- Campus: Urban campus

Ceylon University College was a public university college in Ceylon. Established in 1921, it was Ceylon's first attempt at university education. The college didn't award degrees under its own name but prepared students to sit the University of London's external examination. The college was based in Colombo. The college was merged with Ceylon Medical College in 1942 to form the University of Ceylon. The college was also known as University College, Ceylon; University College, Colombo; and Colombo University College. Its buildings and grounds are now occupied by the University of Colombo which is considered its successor.

== History ==
In the nineteenth century the only institutions to offer higher education in Ceylon were the Ceylon Medical College, Ceylon Law College and a small number of schools which offered undergraduate courses followed by external examinations for Indian or British universities. The country's elite would send their children to be educated at British universities. Demand started growing for the establishment of a university in Ceylon. The Ceylon University Association was formed in 1906 by a group of the country's elite including Ponnambalam Arunachalam, James Peiris and Marcus Fernando. In June 1911 Governor Henry McCallum appointed a ten-member sub-committee of the Legislative Council of Ceylon to look into education in Ceylon. The Macleod Committee finished its work in 1912 and amongst its recommendations were that a university college be established to centralise the country's fragmented higher education system. McCallum accepted the committee's recommendations and submitted the proposals to the Secretary of State for the Colonies and the Board of Education. The proposals were sent back with questions which were in turn answered by Robert Chalmers, McCallum's successor. The college would be called Ceylon University College and would be based in the buildings of Royal College, Colombo. It would be affiliated to an English university, preferably the University of Oxford, and would offer general higher education including courses in arts and sciences for trainee teachers and preliminary courses in chemistry, physics and biology for medical students. The college was to be residential and hostels would be provided by the government. The college was to be open to women. The college would in due course be converted into a degree-granting university. The proposals were accepted by the Secretary of State. World War I and the resulting increases in prices put a halt to the project.

The project was resurrected in 1917 and provision was made in the 1917/18 budget for construction of new facilities and purchase of equipment. However, work was slow and in May 1920 the government purchased Regina Walauwa, a private house on Thurstan Road, for use by the college. Regina Walauwa was later renamed College House. E. B. Denham, the local director of education, decided that the college should open immediately, using College House as lecture rooms whilst the Royal College buildings were completed. Provision was made in the 1920/21 budget for the running of the college which officially opened on 24 January 1921. The college was not affiliated to the University of Oxford as originally proposed, but instead offered courses for the University of London's Intermediate and Final examinations. Edwin Evans, the acting director of education, was the college's first principal. All classes were held at College House except science which was taught at Government Technical Schools. 115 students were registered at the college in its first academic year at the end of which eight students sat the University of London's examinations, seven of whom passed.

Robert Marrs succeeded the director of education as principal at the beginning of the 1921/22 academic year. The University College laboratories were opened by Governor William Manning on 1 October 1921 and the teaching of science was transferred from Government Technical Schools to the new laboratories. The Christian Hostel (Brodie House, Bagatelle Road) and Union Hostel (Guildford Crescent) were opened in October 1922 whilst the Catholic Hostel (Havelock Road) opened in November 1922. The Old Royal College Building was transferred to the college in October 1923 and teaching of arts was transferred from College House to the Old Royal College Building. A hostel for women students (Cruden, Queen's Road) opened in June 1932. Ivor Jennings became principal in 1940.

The college had always been intended to be a stepping stone to a fully fledged degree-granting university. In February 1924 the legislative council set aside Rs. 3 million for the creation of such a university. Marrs had prepared a draft university ordinance, based on the Sadler Commission, by 1925. However, the establishment of the university was delayed by disputes over its location. Ceylon University College was based on an 18 1/2-acre site in Colombo which was inadequate for a university. Marrs favoured a non-residential university based in Colombo. Others, including P. Arunachalam, D. B. Jayatilaka, D. R. Wijewardena and S. C. Paul, favoured Peradeniya or Kandy because of their climate and they had ample cheap land. Governor Hugh Clifford appointed a committee to investigate a site for the university. The committee recommended that the university should be residential and be based at Uyanawatta near Kandy. In 1927 the legislative council resolved that the university should be located in the Dumbara Valley near Kandy and requested the government appoint a commission (the Buchanen-Riddel Commission) to formulate the details. A draft constitution for the university was prepared in 1930.

The legislative council was replaced by the State Council of Ceylon in 1931, and responsibility for the establishment of the university was entrusted to the State Council's various executive committees. In 1937 the State Council approved a motion by George E. de Silva for the university to be located at Aruppola near Kandy. However, Paul and Andreas Nell argued that the site should be in Peradeniya not Aruppola, and they were now supported by Marrs. Eventually Peradeniya was chosen to be the site and it was decided the university would be residential. The Buchanen-Riddel Commission's recommendations were incorporated into the Ceylon University Ordinance No. 20 of 1942 which established the University of Ceylon on 1 July 1942 by amalgamating Ceylon University College with Ceylon Medical College.
