= Institute of Biochemistry, Molecular Biology and Biotechnology =

The Institute of Biochemistry, Molecular Biology and Biotechnology (IBMBB), Sri Lanka, is the National Node for European Molecular Biology Network (EMBnet) and is designated as a Resource Centre for Molecular Life Sciences by the International Programme in Chemical Sciences, University of Uppsala, Sweden.
