= Ceylon Labour Party =

Ceylon Labour Party ලංකා කම්කරු පක්ෂය இலங்கை தொழிலாளர் கட்சி
- Founder: A. E. Gunasinha
- Founded: 1928

The Ceylon Labour Party (CLP) was a political party in Sri Lanka.

== History ==
The Ceylon Labour Party was formed in October 1928, with A. E. Gunasinha as president and Proctor Marshall Perera as secretary. Its executive committee included C. H. Z. Fernando, A. Mahadeva, C. W. W. Kannangara, Victor Corea, George E. de Silva and Satiyawageswera Iyer and women members were included for the first time in Ceylon. Its foundation followed contact between Gunasinha and the British Labour Party; when Ramsay MacDonald, the British Labour Party leader and Prime Minister visited Ceylon in 1926, Gunasinha had received him on behalf of the Ceylonese labour movement. Having already set up the Ceylon Labour Union, Gunasinha modelled the new party on the British Labour Party after a visit to the UK in 1927 when he was encouraged to set up a new party by Labour Party members. Gunasinha had also appeared on behalf of the labour movement at the Donoughmore Commission for universal suffrage and represented Ceylon at the British Empire Labour Conference held in London in 1928.

In the 1931 State Council elections Gunasinha was elected on the Labour Party ticket as Member for Colombo Central. He was re-elected in the 1936 elections. In 1940, he was elected to Colombo Municipal Council and in 1943 became the first Ceylonese Mayor of Colombo.

In the 1947 parliamentary elections, the CLP won a single seat, with Gunasinha elected as the first Member for Colombo Central. He was subsequently appointed as Chief Government Whip in the United National Party coalition government, Minister without Portfolio and Minister of State of the First Parliament of Ceylon by Prime Minister D. S. Senanayake.

Gunasinha was re-elected in the 1952 parliamentary elections as the party's sole MP. After failing to win any seats in the 1956 elections, the party did not contest any further elections.
