= Loranee Senaratne =

Sri Lankan diplomat

Loranee Senaratne (1917 - 2004) was a Sri Lankan diplomat. She was the first woman appointed to head a Sri Lankan diplomatic mission.

== Biography ==
Prime Minister Sirimavo Bandaranaike selected Senaratne to serve as High Commissioner to Ghana from 1963 to 1965. She was also Ambassador to Italy, from 1970 to 1973. Senaratne held the position of secretary of the national Sri Lankan women's group, Lanka Mahila Samiti.

Senaratne was also a writer, and in 1969 published a book on Sri Lankan history Heirs to History.
