= Marcus Fernando =

Ceylonese statesman, physician and banker (1864-1936)

Sir Marcus Fernando
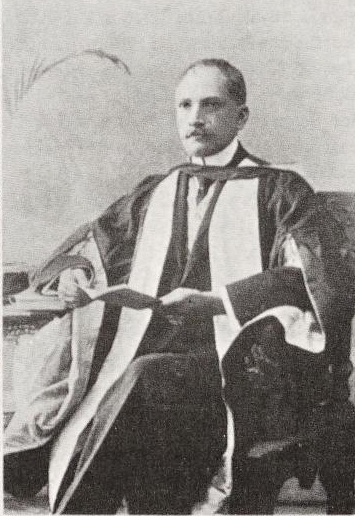
- Born: Hilarion Marcus Fernando; 21 October 1864; Colombo, Ceylon (now Sri Lanka)
- Died: 18 December 1936 (aged 72); Colombo, Ceylon (now Sri Lanka)
- Education: University College London; Colombo Academy; St Benedict's Academy
- Occupations: Physician, public servant, planter, politician
- Spouse: Mary Frances née de Soysa

Sir Hilarion Marcus Fernando, FRCP (21 October 1864 – 18 December 1936) was a pre-independence Ceylonese statesman, physician and banker. He was a member of both the executive council and legislative council, as well as the chairman of the State Mortgage Bank of Ceylon.

== Education ==
Fernando was educated at St Benedicts Academy (later known as St Benedict's College Colombo) and the Colombo Academy (which was subsequently renamed Royal College Colombo). At the Colombo Academy, he won the Turnour Prize, Junior Cambridge Scholarship and the Mathematical Prize. He received a Ceylon Government Scholarship and Scholarship from the Gilchrist Educational Trust, enabling him to study medicine at University College London. He graduated with a BSc, winning the Atchinson Scholarship and University of London Gold Medals in Physiology, Medicine, Forensic Medicine and Obstetrics. He graduated with an MB in 1888, an MD in 1889, and in 1890, was elected a Fellow of University College London.

== Medical career ==
On his return to Ceylon, he served as Registrar of the Ceylon Medical College and the Superintendent of the De Soysa Maternity Home and was appointed the first Consultant Physician to be appointed to the General Hospital Colombo. He contributed to scientific discussions on a wide range of diseases, and is associated with a discussion on Diabetes in the Tropics, where he is credited with the observation that it was more common among the affluent Ceylonese. He was a member of the Ceylon Branch of the British Medical Association, was Secretary from 1891 to 1897, and President in the years 1905 and 1914. He was the founding Director of the Bacteriological Institute in Colombo, and Chemical Examiner to the Government of Ceylon.

== Political career ==
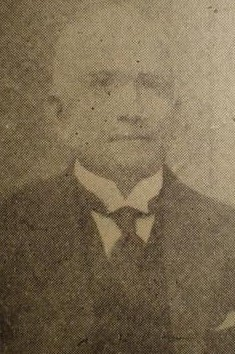
Sir Marcus Fernando

At the age of 43, he resigned from the medical service to take up a career in business and politics. He contested unsuccessfully for the newly created seat (proposed by Sir James Peiris) in the 1911 legislative council election losing to the conservative, but well known retired government servant, Sir Ponnambalam Ramanathan, but subsequently served on both the Executive Council and Legislative Councils. Fernando's manifesto had proposed a progressive programme towards industrialisation. He supported the Donoughmore Constitution enabling general elections with adult universal suffrage and was largely responsible for devising wider representation to the Northern Tamils and Eastern Muslims. Fernando was a former proprietor of The Ceylon Independent, when the editorial staff included Noel Gratiaen and Manicasothy Saravanamuttu.

In 1931 the State Mortgage Bank of Ceylon (the first state-owned bank) was established with Sir Marcus Fernando as its chairman. He also assisted to create the Bank of Ceylon. He, along with Sir James Peiris and Sir Ponnambalam Arunachalam, were instrumental in the creation of the University of Ceylon. He was made a Knight Batchelor in the 1923 New Year Honours. In 1929, he co-founded the Rotary Club of Colombo.

== Family ==
His father was Andrew Fernando Jr. and his grandfather Andrew Fernando Sr. was the Mudaliyer of Colombo. In 1891 he married Mary Frances, second daughter of Charles Henry de Soysa and Lady de Soysa, they had two daughters and a son. Advocate Charles Matthew Fernando, the first Ceylonese Crown Counsel was his brother. His nephews were Chevalier C.H.Z. Fernando, a pioneer labour unionist Councillor and campaigner for universal suffrage, founding the Young Lanka League and the Ceylon Labour Party, the only Ceylonese to have met Lenin, and C. M. Fernando, a founder member of the SLFP.

== Legacy ==
The Association Sri Lanka Medical Association commemorates his life through an endowed oration. Orators include Surendra Ramachandran, Nimal Senanayake and Hithanadura Janaka De Silva. A hall of residence in the University of Peradeniya and a road in Colombo 7 are named after him in his honour.
