= College House, Colombo =

Administrative center of the University of Colombo

College House
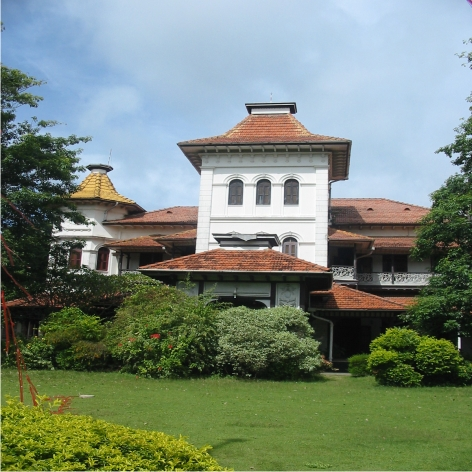
- College House the administrative headquarters of the University of Colombo.
- Former names: Regina Walauwa

General information
- Architectural style: Travancore
- Location: Colombo, Sri Lanka
- Completed: 1912
- Owner: University of Colombo

College House is the administrative center of the University of Colombo, situated in the Cinnamon Gardens suburb of Colombo, it is a national heritage site.

With construction completed in 1912, the house was built by Thomas Henry Arthur de Soysa, who was a prominent businessmen and the Consul for Chile. He was also the son of Sir Charles Henry de Soysa and named the house Regina Walauwa, after his wife Regina Perera. Arthur de Soysa sold the house to the Government of Ceylon in 1920 to establish the University College Colombo the following year. With the name of the house changed to College House on the instructions of Sir Edward Denham. The Library of the University College began in a room of the house with a collection of books belonging to A. Padmanabha, gifted by his father Sir Ponnambalam Arunachalam.

Following the formation of the University of Colombo it became it administrative center and housed the office of the Vice Chancellor. On March 8, 1989, elements of the Janatha Vimukthi Peramuna assassinated the Vice Chancellor, Prof Stanley Wijesundera at the Library Room in the College House.

A new building was constructed on the ground as part of the expansion of the university administration in the 1980s and to house the Faculty of Graduate Studies.

== See also ==
- Walauwa
- Kumaratunga Munidasa Mawatha
