= Lady Ridgeway Hospital for Children =

Children's hospital in Colombo, Sri Lanka

Coordinates: 6.9176°N 79.8758°E

Lady Ridgeway Hospital for Children (රිජ්වේ ආර්යා ළමා රෝහල லேடி றிஜ்வே சிறுவர் வைத்தியசாலை)
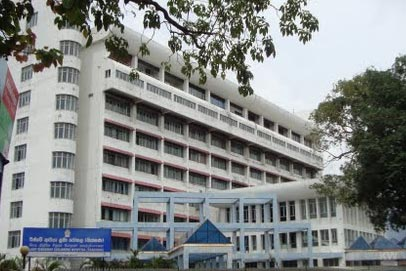
- Lady Ridgeway Hospital for Children

Geography
- Location: Dr. Denister De Silva Mawatha, Colombo 08, Sri Lanka

Organisation
- Care system: Government
- Type: Teaching
- Affiliated university: University of Colombo

Services
- Beds: 1232 licensed beds (as of December 2013)
- Speciality: Pediatrics and pediatric subspecialties

History
- Founded: 1895

Links
- Website: lrh.health.gov.lk
- Lists: Hospitals in Sri Lanka

The Lady Ridgeway Hospital for Children is a tertiary care children's hospital in Colombo, Sri Lanka. t has a bed-strength of over 1200. Established by public subscription in 1895 as the Lady Havelock Hospital for Women and Children, it was named the Lady Ridgeway Hospital for Children in 1910. Both these distinguished ladies were the respective wives of successive British Governors in Ceylon - Sir Arthur Havelock and Sir Joseph West Ridgeway.

Lady Ridgeway Hospital serves as the national referral center for pediatric care for Sri Lanka. It also serves as local pediatric hospital for the population in and around Colombo city for emergency and outpatient care.

All services are free of charge in keeping with the free state health care policy of the Sri Lankan Government.

In July 2021, Sri Lankan cricketer Angelo Mathews announced that he was interested in taking a major responsibility to find donors for a social welfare project titled "Little Hearts" which is also a national fundraising project being initiated in order to build a Cardiac and Critical Care Complex at the LRH hospital. He was inspired to get involved with the Little Hearts fundraiser after acknowledging the way the doctors and nurses had treated his daughter who was admitted to LRH hospital.

== Outpatient care ==
The Outpatient Department (OPD) and the Accident Service Department of this hospital are open for services 24 hours a day, 365 days a year. Outpatient clinics conducted by the relevant consultants of inpatient units and visiting consultants of the OPD maintain a continuous link with patients discharged from their units. There is also an emergency treatment unit, diarrhea treatment unit and immunization clinic which operate in the OPD to improve the quality of care. The outpatient attendance is over one million per year and about 50,000 children are immunised annually.

== Inpatient care ==
Currently the hospital has six general paediatric medical and four general paediatric surgery units. It has specialised units in cardiology and cardiothoracic surgery, orthopaedic, rheumatology, rehabilitation, dermatology, ophthalmology, psychiatry, neonatology, intensive care, orthodontics, maxillo-facial surgery, plastic surgery, burns and ENT surgery.

In addition to these, radiology, pathology, haematology, microbiology and anesthesiology departments headed by senior consultants provide quality assistance to both inpatients and outpatients.

As this hospital acts as a teaching hospital under the Ministry of Health, it is responsible for undergraduate and most of the post graduate medical and surgical paediatric training. Undergraduate and postgraduate training is provided by all units of the hospital. It is affiliated with the Faculty of Medicine, University of Colombo and Postgraduate Institute of Medicine. The two university units at this hospital are also directly involved in undergraduate and postgraduate medical training. Intern medical officers are also accommodated for their six-month internship training at the hospital.
