= Ceylon Medical College =

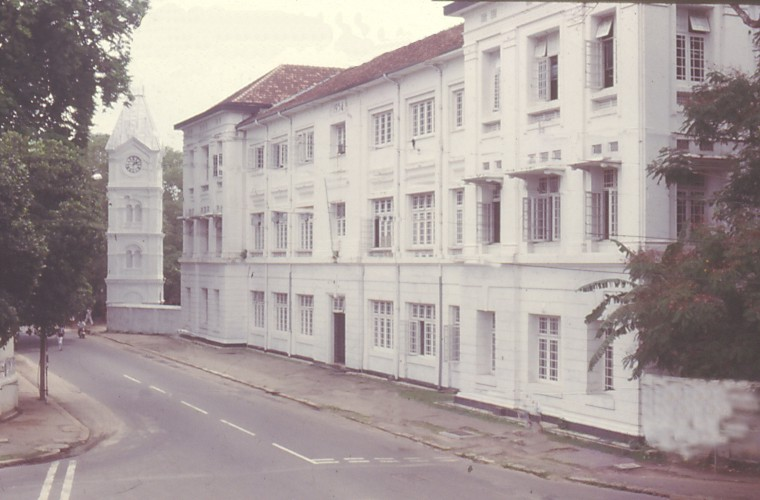
- Type: Public
- Active: 1 June 1870–1 July 1942
- Location: Colombo, Western Province, Ceylon; 06°55′08.30″N 79°52′16.30″E
- Campus: Urban campus

Ceylon Medical College was a public medical school in Ceylon. The college was established in 1870 as the Colombo Medical School. The college was based in Colombo. The college was merged with Ceylon University College in 1942 to form the University of Ceylon. The medical college became the university's faculty of medicine. The college was also known as Colombo Medical College.

== History ==
The Bengal Medical College was established in Calcutta in 1835. In 1839 Stewart-Mackenzie, the British Governor of Ceylon, started sending a small number of Ceylonese to study medicine in Calcutta. In 1847 Samuel Fisk Green, an American medical missionary, started a private medical school in Manipay, northern Ceylon. The establishment of a medical school in Ceylon was advocated by Governor George William Anderson in 1852.

The island was hit by the yaws disease in the 1860s, leading to a massive depopulation in the Vanni. In 1867 governor Hercules Robinson appointed James Loos, the colonial surgeon for the Northern Province, to investigate the depopulation. Amongst Loos' recommendations was that there should be a plan for medical education in the country. The Colombo Medical School was opened on 1 June 1870 by Governor Robinson. The school was based in the female surgical ward of the then General Hospital in Colombo. The school was controlled by the government's Principal Civil Medical Officer. The school's courses lasted five years after which students sat examinations and if they passed they received a diploma of Licentiate of Medicine and Surgery (LMS). This allowed them to practice medicine and surgery. The school had lecture rooms, laboratories, dissecting rooms and two libraries. Physics and chemistry was taught at Ceylon Technical College. The first batch consisted of 25 students (all male). James Loos was the school's first principal.

The school benefited from large endowments, including land and buildings, provided by locals. In 1875 Mudaliyar Samson Rajapakse gifted three and a half acres of land on which the school's successor, the Faculty of Medicine, University of Colombo, stands today. The De Soysa Hospital/Lying-in-Home and the biology building was given to the school by Sir Charles Henry de Soysa. In the same year his uncle Mudaliyar Susew de Soysa donated the school buildings which housed the colonial medical library, the pathology museum and the biological laboratory. His son Mudaliyar J. W. C. de Soysa provided the funds to build the bacteriological institute in 1899. Other benefactors included Muhandiram A. Simon Fernando Wijegooneratne and Vimala Gunawardane.

The school's course length was extended to four years in 1873. Loos left the school in 1875 after being appointed colonial surgeon for the Central Province. He was replaced by Edwin Lawson Koch. In 1876 the government started providing scholarships which provided free education at the school and post-graduate studies in Britain. Koch died in 1877 and was replaced by Julian Louis Vanderstraatcn. The school was renamed Ceylon Medical College in 1880. The college's course length was extended to five years in 1884.

On 29 December 1887 the school's LMS diploma was recognised by the General Medical Council at a meeting of the Privy Council held at Osborne House. This recognition meant that holders of the Colombo LMS were registered medical practitioners under the Medical Act 1886 and could practice anywhere in the British Empire. They could also pursue post-graduate studies in Britain without needing to re-take any undergraduate courses.

The college started admitting female students in 1892. Allan Perry took over from Vanderstraatcn in 1898. In 1905 two ordinances were passed relating to the college. The Council of the Ceylon Medical College was incorporated by Ordinance No. 3 1905. Ordinance No. 5 1905 (Medical Registration Ordinance) allowed the Council of the Ceylon Medical College to register individuals (including holders of the Colombo LMS) allowed to practice medicine and surgery in Ceylon.

The Ceylon University Ordinance No. 20 of 1942 established the University of Ceylon on 1 July 1942 by amalgamating Ceylon Medical College with Ceylon University College. The medical college became the new university's faculty of medicine.

== Principals ==
Principal	Took office	Left office
James Loos	1870	1875
Edwin Lawson Koch	1875	1877
Julian Louis Vanderstraatcn	1878	1898
Allan Perry	1898	1915
O. J. Rutherford		
J. F. E. Bridger		
J. F. L. Briereliffe		
S. T. Gunasekera		
