= University of Colombo =

Public university in Colombo, Sri Lanka

Coordinates: 6.90157°N 79.85962°E

- කොළඹ විශ්වවිද්‍යාලය கொழும்புப் பல்கலைக்கழகம்
- Motto: Sanskrit: बुद्धिः सर्वत्र भ्राजते (Buddhih Sarvatra Bhrajate)
- Motto in English: Wisdom Enlightens
- Type: Public research university
- Established: 1870; 156 years ago
- Accreditation: University Grants Commission (Sri Lanka)
- Academic affiliations: University Grants Commission (Sri Lanka), Association of Commonwealth Universities, International Association of Universities
- Endowment: LKR 1.461 billion
- Chancellor: Ven. Muruththettuwe Ananda Thero
- Vice-Chancellor: Professor Indika Mahesh Karunathilake
- Faculty: 843
- Administrative staff: 88
- Students: 37,636
- Undergraduates: 19,216
- Postgraduates: 10,678
- Location: Colombo, Sri Lanka
- Campus: Urban
- Publications: University of Colombo Review, The Ceylon Journal of Medical Science
- Colours: UOC Purple
- Sporting affiliations: Sri Lanka University Games
- Website: cmb.ac.lk

The University of Colombo (informally Colombo University or UoC) is a public research university located primarily in Colombo, Sri Lanka. It is the oldest institution of modern higher education in Sri Lanka. It specializes in the fields of Natural, Social, Applied, Formal, and Computer Sciences as well as Fine Arts, Law and Technology. It is ranked among the top 10 universities in South Asia.

The University of Colombo was founded in 1921 as University College Colombo, affiliated with the University of London. Degrees were issued to its students from 1923 onwards. The university traces its roots to 1870 when the Ceylon Medical School was established. UoC has produced notable alumni in the fields of science, law, economics, business, literature, and politics.

== Overview ==
The university is a state university, with most of its funding coming from the central government via the University Grants Commission (UGC). Therefore, as with all other state universities in Sri Lanka, the UGC recommends its vice-chancellor for appointment by the President of Sri Lanka and makes appointments of its administrative staff. Its motto is "Buddhih Sarvatra Bhrajate", which means "Wisdom shines forth everywhere" in Sanskrit.

With a student population of over 11,000, the university is made up of ten faculties with 65 academic departments and eight institutions. Most faculties offer both undergraduate and postgraduate degrees, with some offering courses for external students and distance-learning programs.

== History ==
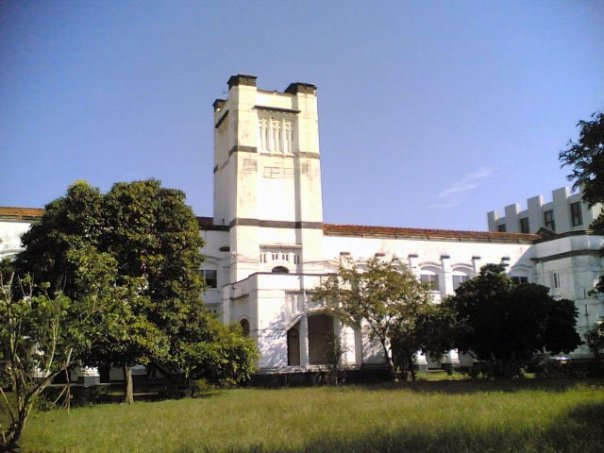
The iconic Old Royal College Building, now home to the Department of Mathematics, with the University tower.

=== Ceylon Medical College ===
The origins of the University of Colombo lie in the establishment of the Ceylon Medical School in June 1870. It was the second European medical school to be established in South Asia. In 1880, the school was raised to the status of college, thus becoming the Ceylon Medical College, which permitted it to award the Licentiate in Medicine and Surgery (LMS), which continued until the late 1940s. In 1889, the college was recognised by the General Medical Council of the United Kingdom when holders of its license became eligible to practice in Great Britain.

=== Ceylon University College ===
The Ceylon University Association (CUA) was formed in 1906 by a group of western-educated elite, including Sir Ponnambalam Arunachalam, Sir James Peiris and Sir Marcus Fernando. Owing to the persistent demands of the CUA the government decided in 1913 to set up a University college.

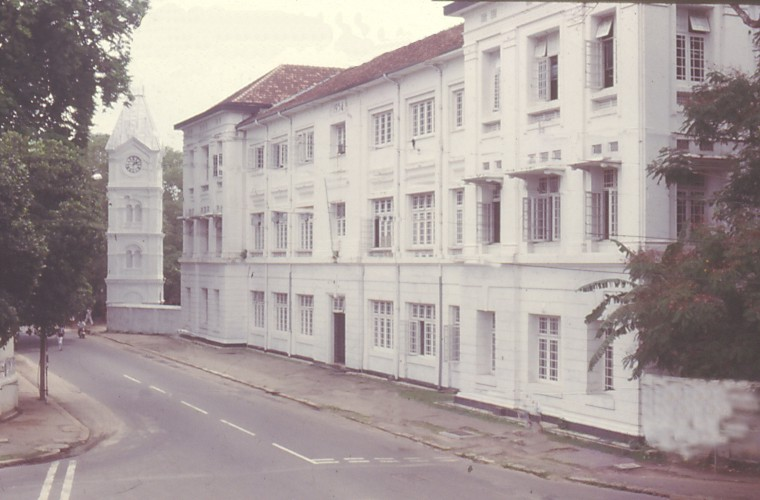
The Faculty of Medicine building and the Koch Memorial Clock Tower on Kynsey Road

Arguments regarding the nature and status of the institution to be set up, its location, and the outset of World War I halted the establishment process until 1920 when the government purchased a private mansion called the Regina Walawwa which later came to be known as College House for the purpose of setting up the University College under the recommendations of Sir Edward Denham.

The Ceylon University College was formerly declared open in January 1921 in the building that was originally the main building of Royal College Colombo, located on Kumarathunga Munidasa Mawatha (formerly Thurstan Road) opposite College House. The University College was affiliated to the University of London and prepared students for University of London external degrees, which were jointly examined. Even though this fell short of a full university for Ceylon, it proved a platform to develop the academia required for a university. It had two departments: Arts and Science.

University rankings

Regional – Overall
- QS Asia: =275 (2025)

=== University of Ceylon ===
The University of Ceylon was established on 1 July 1942 by the Ceylon University Ordinance No.20 of 1942, which was passed by the State Council of Ceylon amidst World War II and the threat of Japanese invasion. The Ceylon University College and the Ceylon Medical College were combined to form the University of Ceylon, with its administration based at College House and the ability to grant its own degrees. The two departments of Arts and Science of the University College were upgraded to faculties, the Medical College became the faculty of medicine and a new faculty of Oriental Studies was established at Cruden House. The university library was based at Villa Venezia in Queens Road. Residential facilities were provided at the Union Hostel with three halls of residence Jayatilleke and Arunachalam based at Guildford Crescent and Queens Hall (Q Hall or Women's hostel) along with two other hostels named Brodie and Aquinas.

Following the completion of new buildings at Peradeniya, the departments of Law and Agriculture and the department of Veterinary Science were transferred out of Colombo to Peradeniya in 1949; the department of Law was brought back to Colombo in 1965. Later in 1952, the faculties of Arts and Oriental Studies were moved to Peradeniya too, along with sections of the university administration and library. Two halls of residence, Jayatilleke Hall and Arunachalam Hall, were transferred to Peradeniya too. The Faculty of Engineering, University of Peradeniya|Faculty of Engineering]] was established in 1950 and was later transferred to Peradeniya in 1965.

Sections of the University of Ceylon, which functioned in Colombo and Peradeniya, acted as campuses of the same university until 1966. But in 1966, these campuses were split into two. The section located in Colombo was known as the University of Ceylon, Colombo, while the section located in Peradeniya was known asthe University of Ceylon, Peradeniya.

=== University of Ceylon, Colombo Campus ===
The announcement of the creation of a separate university in Colombo was made in Parliament in the Throne Speech of 1967. The necessary legislation for this purpose had been prepared by the Minister of Education and Cultural Affairs under section 34 of the Higher Education Act No. 20 of 1966 on the recommendation of the National Council of Higher Education. The new institution, which came into existence on 1 October 1967 with the Colombo Campus as its nucleus, had a student population of nearly 5000 reading for degrees in arts, law, the sciences and medicine, and a teaching staff of nearly 300.

The University of Ceylon Act No. 1 of 1972, which replaced the Higher Education Act of 1966, altered the university structure. The four independent autonomous universities (University of Ceylon, Peradeniya, University of Ceylon, Colombo, Vidyodaya University and Vidyalankara University), which had been set up by then and the Ceylon College of Technology at Katubedda became campuses of a single university styled the University of Sri Lanka. Its headquarters designated Senate House was located in Colombo. This arrangement did not last very long. With the promulgation of the Universities Act. No 16 of 1978, university status was again restored to the Campuses, and the Colombo Campus of the University of Sri Lanka was renamed the University of Colombo, Sri Lanka.

=== University of Colombo ===
Under the Universities Act No. 16, 1978, the University of Sri Lanka was split into six independent, autonomous universities as University of Colombo, University of Peradeniya, University of Sri Jayewardenepura, University of Kelaniya, University of Moratuwa and University of Jaffna. This Act brought back some of the central features of the Ceylon University Ordinance of 1942 such as the Senates, the Councils, and Courts.

== Organization ==
Faculty/Institution	Year founded
Faculty of Medicine	1942
Faculty of Science	1942
Faculty of Arts	1942
Faculty of Law	1967
Faculty of Education	1973
Faculty of Graduate Studies	1987
Faculty of Management and Finance	1994
Sri Palee Campus	1996
School of Computing	2002
Faculty of Technology	2017
Faculty of Nursing	2017
Faculty of Indigenous Medicine	2023

The University of Colombo has ten faculties of study. These faculties contain 65 academic departments in addition to the faculties it has a small campus and a computer school that contain five academic departments of their own. In addition, the university has six institutions and five affiliated centers. At the beginning, it had only three of the current faculties, namely; the Faculty of Law, the Faculty of Medicine and the Faculty of Science. Since then, seven other faculties have been added. School of Computing (UCSC) was established in 2002 while the Faculty of Nursing and the Faculty of Technology was established in 2017. The Latest addition was the Faculty of Engineering which inaugurated in 2021.

There are six postgraduate institutions affiliated, three of which are located on campus. These include the Postgraduate Institute of Medicine, the only institution in the country that provides specialist training of medical doctors. The Colombo Planetarium and the Colombo Observatory are located within the main campus of the university.

== University Library ==
University of Colombo library is a centrally-administered network of libraries of the university primary made up of the main library and two branch libraries. It is the oldest academic library in the country since its constituent Colombo Medical College library was established in 1870. Containing 400,000 plus items, it is one of the largest libraries in the country. Two branches of the library are established in faculties in the Faculty of Medicine and the Faculty of Science. The Ceylon Collection and the Rare Collection contains large number of important documents and books including a large palm-leaf manuscript collection.

== Publications ==
The UoC publishes some of the key academic journals in the country.

- University of Colombo Review
- The Ceylon Journal of Medical Science
- Sri Lanka Journal of International Law
- International Journal on Advances in ICT for Emerging Regions
- Sri Lanka Journal of Bio-Medical Informatics
- Sri Lanka Journal of Critical Care

== International collaborations ==
UoC has established international links with universities around the world. Such links would be traced as far back as 1921 when the University College Colombo established close links to the University of London. Modern links have led to several global partnerships that have resulted in exchange in teaching and learning models, collaborative research, curriculum design, and student exchange.

The International Unit of the University of Colombo (IUUC) coordinates and develops international links. IUUC facilitates staff exchanges, distance learning, dual degree programs, joint conferences, seminars, workshops and academic networking.

=== Global networking ===
UoC is a member of several international academic networks:

- Asian Universities Alliance (AUA)
- Association of Commonwealth Universities (ACU)
- Association of Southeast Asian Institutions of Higher Learning (ASAIHL)
- International Association of Universities (IAU)

=== International teaching and research partners ===
- La Trobe University, Australia
- Western Sydney University, Australia
- Monash University, Australia
- University of British Columbia, Canada
- University of Ottawa, Canada
- Darmstadt University of Technology, Germany
- City University of Hong Kong, Hong Kong
- Mahatma Gandhi University, India
- Ritsumeikan University, Japan
- University of Oslo, Norway
- National University of Singapore, Singapore
- University of Uppsala, Sweden
- University of London, United Kingdom
- University of Pennsylvania, United States

=== Government partnerships ===
- (European Union) European Molecular Biology Network
- Government of Sweden – research Cooperation: SAREC Project
- (Sweden) Swedish International Development Cooperation Agency (SIDA)
- United Nations Development Programme (UNDP) – Research co-operation

== Student life ==
Student organizations

Over 10,000 students attend the University of Colombo and others follow external degree programs conducted by the university. Students at the University of Colombo run over 40 clubs and organizations, including cultural and religious groups, academic clubs and teams, and common-interest organizations. Each faculty has its own Students Unions, where committee members are elected to by the students of the faculty. These student societies include:

- Arts Students' Union
- Medical Students' Union
- Science Students' Council
- Law Students' Union
- UCSC Students' Union
- Moot Court and Debating Society, Faculty of Law
- Religious Societies
  - Buddhist Students' Association
  - Muslim Majlis
  - Hindu Students' Union
  - Catholic Students' Movement
  - Student Christian Movement
- FMF Media Unit - Faculty of Management and Finance Media Unit
- AIESEC Colombo Central Local Committee
- Epsilon Delta Society
- Rotaract Club
- Computer Science Society (CompSoc)
- UCSC ISACA Student Group
- Tamil Literary Union
- Mathematical and Astronomical Society
- Physics Society
- FOS Media - Faculty of Science Media Unit
- University Amalgamated Club
- Technology students' Union
- Techno Media - Faculty of Technology Media Unit

== Residential facilities ==
Since its inception, the University of Colombo has maintained residential facilities for its undergraduate students. This has been an integral part of the urban university culture of the UoC. Some of the early residential halls that were part of the Union Hostel which was based in Colombo were moved to Peradeniya in the 1950s, these residential halls function independently now. Currently, the university has nine student hostels along with several houses leased on a temporary basis which is administrated by the Student's Center. These hostels provide accommodation for 2973 undergraduate students annually. Residential facilities for academics and visiting faculty are provided both on and off campus.

Men

- Bloemfontein Medical Hostel
- The Lamela Hostel
- Kithyakara Hostel
- Sarasavi Medura Boys Hostel

Women

- Sujata Jayawardena Memorial Hostel
- Muttiah Hostel
- Havelock Road Hostel
- Sarasavi Medura Girls Hostel
- De Saram Hostel

== Clubs and sports ==
In the university, there are forty-three Students' societies and associations functioning in the university engaging in activities and interests. The university has a strong Rotaract movement with clubs established in three faculties.

Sports activities of the university are implemented by the Department of Physical Education via the University Amalgamated Club. The Amalgamated Club includes 29 Captains and Vice-Captains of the major sports played by the UoC at an inter-university level. The Amalgamated club's strong movement to the university sports can be seen from 2006, under the president Sachitra Samarasinghe. The Sports Board is an advisory body to the Department of Physical Education. Annually the university takes part in the Inter-University sports Championships and the University Games. Within the university, itself inter-faculty tournaments and the University Championship are held and University Colours awarded. The UoC has links with many sports bodies such as Sri Lanka Cricket, Sri Lanka Rugby Football Union, Tennis Association of Sri Lanka, Colombo Rowing Club, etc.

Facilities for most sports are provided within the university, with a gymnasium for indoor sports and the university sports ground for out door sports. The swimming and rowing team has use of the swimming pool of Royal College Colombo and the Colombo Rowing Club facilities respectively.

The University of Colombo are the overall champions of the Sri Lanka University Games which is held every three years among the public universities in Sri Lanka. The university is also the most successful in the games winning 8 out of the 10 championships since its inception in 1980.

== Past Chancellors and Vice-Chancellors ==
Chancellors

- University of Ceylon
  - Sir Andrew Caldecott (1942–44)
  - Sir Henry Monck-Mason Moore (1944–49)
  - Lord Soulbury (1949–54)
  - Sir Oliver Goonetilleke (1954–62)
  - William Gopallawa (1962–72)
- University of Sri Lanka
  - William Gopallawa (1972–78)
- University of Colombo
  - J.R. Jayewardene (1978–1981)
  - P.R. Anthonis (1981–2002)
  - Oswald Gomis (2002-2021)
  - Ven. Muruththettuwe Ananda Thero (17 November 2021 - Present)

Presidents

- Colombo Campus (1972–1977)
  - Osmund Jayaratne
  - M. B. Ariyapala
  - P. P. G. L. Siriwardena
  - Hiran Dias

Vice-Chancellors

- University College Colombo
  - Robert Marrs (1922–1939)
  - Sir Ivor Jennings (1940–1942)
- University of Ceylon
  - Sir Ivor Jennings (1942–1954)
  - Sir Nicholas Attygalle (1954–1967)
  - O.H. de A. Wijesekera (1967)
- University of Ceylon, Colombo
  - Walwin A. de Silva (1968–1969)
  - B. A. Abeywickrema (1969–1972)
- University of Sri Lanka
  - B. A. Abeywickrema (1972–1974)
  - L. H. Sumanadasa(1974)
  - P. P. G. L. Siriwardena (1974–1978)
- University of Colombo
  - Stanley Wijesundera (1978–1988)
  - G. L. Peiris (1988–1994)
  - Nandadasa Kodagoda (1994)
  - W. D. Lakshman (1994–1999)
  - Savitri Goonesekere (1999–2002)
  - T. Hettiarachchy (2002–2007)
  - Kshanika Hirimburegama (2007–2013)
  - W. K. Hirimburegama (2013–2015)
  - Lakshman Dissanayake (2015-2019)
  - Chandrika N. Wijayaratne (2019-2022)
  - H. D. Karunarathne (2022-2025)

== See also ==
- List of split up universities
