= Attygalle murder =

The murder of Francis Dixon Attygalle (known as the Attygalle murder) took place on 5 December 1906, after he was shot in the abdomen and later succumbed to his injuries in hospital. The murder became Ceylon's first sensational trial, which lay blame on Attygalle's brother-in-law John Kotelawala Sr, who committed suicide in jail before the verdict was given.

== Background ==
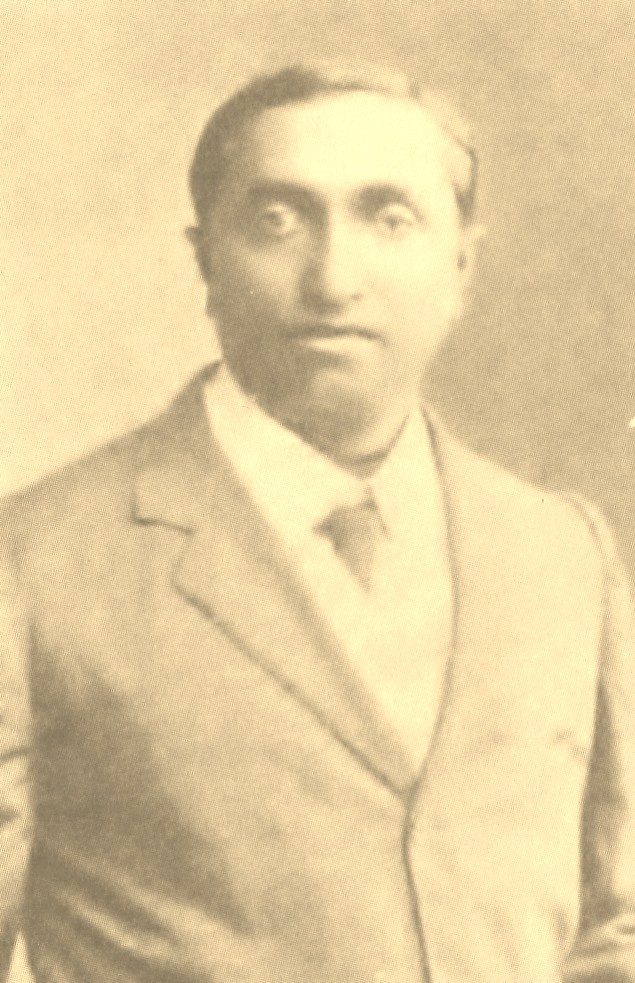
John Kotelawala Snr.

John Kotelawala Sr, a police inspector married Alice Elizabeth Attygalle, daughter of the wealthy Mudaliyar Don Charles Gemoris Attygalle, after an illicit love affair to which the Attygalle family objected, but later conceded. As dowry, Kotelawala received 2,058 acres (833 ha) of rubber and coconut estates, as well as a one-fourth share of graphite mines owned by the Attygalle family.

Soon after, the ill Mudaliyar Gemoris Attygalle died in 1901 and Kotelawala resigned from the police force and took over the management of the Attygalle family business, since the Mudaliyar's only son, Francis Dixon Attygalle, was a minor. Later the Mudaliyar's widow, Petronella Attygalle, accused Kotelawala of misappropriating funds, and took legal action to bar him from the family business. She filed several cases in the Kurunegala District Court to eject him from the management. Francis Dixon Attygalle left Wesley College, aged 16, to take over the family business. Petronella made representations to the governor and had letters of venia aetatis conferred, thus freeing Francis Dixon Attygalle from the status of minor. She also had her second daughter Lena marry T. G. Jayewardene, an engineer in the Public Works Department and a lieutenant in the Ceylon Light Infantry. The Jayewardenes were a family of lawyers, and Kotelawala insulted them on the day of the wedding.

Thereafter, Kotelawala was removed from the management of the Attygalle family business and he started his own business ventures, in transportation using bullock carts. He had confrontations in managing his estate he received as dowry from the Attygalle family, which led to increasing the animosity against Francis Dixon Attygalle. In 1905, he formed the Ceylon-Japan Trading Company and set out for Japan on business.

== Murder ==
Francis Dixon Attygalle, on 5 December 1906 was staying at the house of C.P. Dias, Wesley College Head Master in Pettah as was his practice when he came to Colombo from his home in Collamune Walauwa in the Salpita Korale. At 10 PM, he was called out to the veranda by a man named Baron Singho when he was shot in the abdomen and was taken to hospital in a very critical condition. The police were alerted of the incident and Herbert Dowbiggin, Superintendent of Police, Colombo went to the Pettah Police Station and then to the crime scene to direct investigations. Initial investigations indicated that a gunshot was fired from behind a bush from a crouching position. Baron Singho and Singhoney Perera, a former police constable were arrested, following a confession by a man named Piloris who had turned himself in to the police. Baron Singho and Singhoney Perera were taken to Attygalle in hospital for identification. Attygalle identified Baron Singho as the person talking to him at the time of the shooting and died soon after. With evidence indicating that Singhoney Perera was the shooter, suspicion soon fell on John Kotelawala. Singhoney Perera had served under John Kotelawala when the latter was a police inspector at the Kollupitiya Police Station in 1895. Since leaving the police, Perera lived in a house belonging to Kotelawala in Messenger Street and helped Kotelawla in collecting rents.

== Trial ==
Non-summary proceedings were held by Magistrate Keith Macleod, and these were held within the Welikada Prison, as it was deemed safer and limited the crowds witnessing the proceedings. After the non-summary proceedings were terminated and the case was committed to the Supreme Court of Ceylon, Kotelawala asked for an English-speaking jury. The Supreme Court trial began on 15 April at Hulftsdorf, with Justice Alexander Wood Renton presiding, and drew large crowds. The prosecution was led by Crown Counsel C. M. Fernando, assisted by B. W. Bawa, H. J. C. Pereira, and R. H. Morgan. The accused were defended by Eardley Norton, a Calcutta lawyer, assisted by T. Thornhill, F. W. Williams, P. G. Cooke, Hayley, Schneider and Donald Obeyasekara.

Piloris, alias Pila, had been hired by Singhoney Perera and Baron Singho to carry out the murder since he knew how to handle a gun, having fought in the Boer War under Winston Churchill. Singhoney Perera and Baron Singho had also purchased a gun from the Walkers for Rs 25 and kept Pila in a rented room. They had planned to kill him after the murder, but failed when Pila took a different escape route. He was arrested by the police and confessed to the murder. He was offered a pardon, in exchange for becoming a crown witness.

Singhoney Perera was found guilty and sentenced to death. Baron Singho was acquitted. On 14 June at 8:00 am, Perera was executed at Welikade prison.

Despairing of the outcome, Kotelawala committed suicide in jail on the fourth day of the trial by taking poison, leaving a letter claiming his innocence.

== Long-term effects ==
Alice Elizabeth Kotelawala and her young family faced destitution having spent a large amount of funds on her husband's legal defence. On his deathbed, Francis Dixon Attygalle willed his wealth to his sister Lena Jayewardene and unmarried younger sister Ellen who married F. R. Senanayake. The Senanayakes assisted Alice Kotelawala in her situation by giving her shares of the Kahatagaha Graphite Mine and of the family estates as well as taking care of the education of the Kotelawala children. F. R. Senanayake who was leading the Sri Lankan independence movement, died on a pilgrimage to India in 1924. Senanayake's brother D. S. Senanayake took over leadership of the independence movement and formed the United National Party and was elected as the first Prime Minister of Ceylon in 1947. He was loyally supported by Kotelawala's son John Kotelawala, who went on to become the third prime minister of Ceylon in 1953. F. R. Senanayake's son R. G. Senanayake and T. G. Jayewardene's son T. F. Jayewardene had active political careers serving as Members of Parliament and ministers.
