= Attygalle =

Attygalle ආටිගල
- Pronunciation: Āṭigala
- Language: Sinhala

Origin
- Region of origin: Sri Lanka

Attygalle (Sinhala: ආටිගල, romanized: Āṭigala) is a Sinhalese surname. Notable people bearing the surname include:

- Athula Attygalle (born 1950), Sri Lankan scientist
- C. E. Attygalle (1905–1980), Ceylonese politician
- Dhanapala Attygalle, Sri Lankan politician
- Dharmasena Attygalle (1925–1989), Sri Lankan politician
- Don Charles Gemoris Attygalle (1836–1901), Ceylonese businessman
- Francis Dixon Attygale (died 1906), murder victim - see Attygalle murder
- John Attygalle (1906–1981), Ceylonese police officer
- Nicholas Attygalle (1894–1970), Ceylonese academic
- Sepala Attygalle (1921–2001), Ceylonese army officer
