= Fredrick Richard Senanayake =

Ceylonesen lawyer and independence activist (1882-1926)

F. R. Senanayake

Colombo Municipal Councilor
- In office 1912–1926

Personal details
- Born: 20 October 1882 Botale, Mirigama, Ceylon
- Died: 1 January 1926 (aged 43) Kolkata, India
- Spouse: Ellen Attygalle
- Relations: D. S. Senanayake (brother)
- Children: R. G. Senanayake
- Education: Downing College, Cambridge, Royal College, Colombo, S. Thomas' College, Mount Lavinia
- Profession: Barrister

Fredrick Richard Senanayake (known to as F. R. Senanayake) (20 October 1882 – 1 January 1926) was a Ceylonese lawyer and independence activist. A leading member of the Sri Lankan independence movement, he was an elected member of the Colombo Municipal Council and became a barrister of independent Sri Lanka in 1947. D. S. Senanayake, who would go on to lead Sri Lanka's independence movement, was his younger brother.

== Early life and education ==
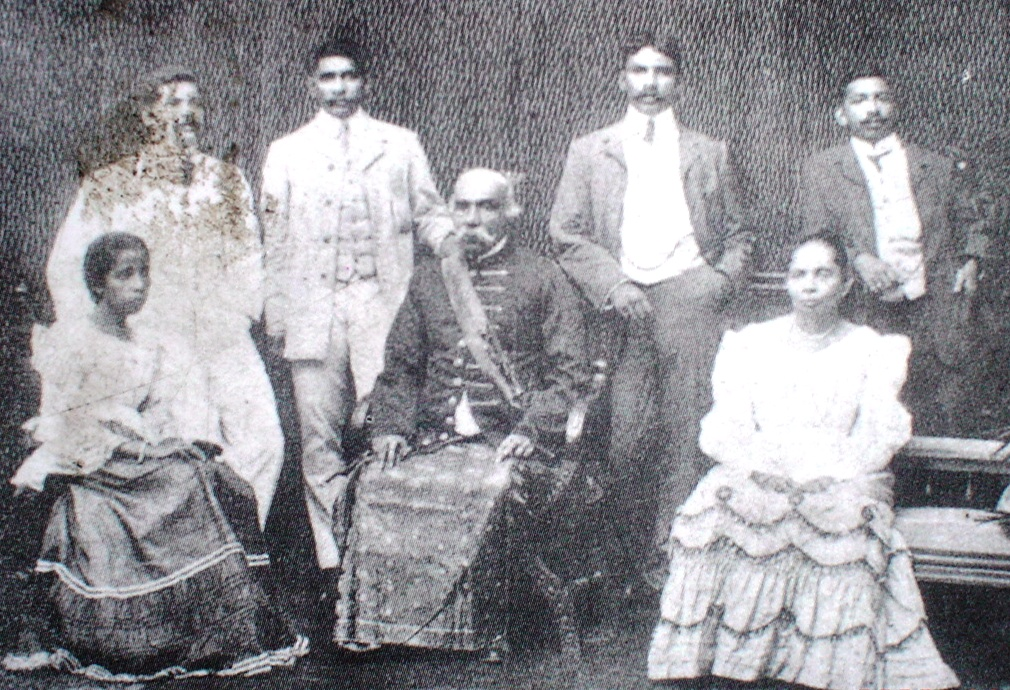
D.S. Senanayake, with brother-in-law F.H. Dias-Bandaranaike, brothers Don Charles and Don Stephen, sister Maria Frances, father Mudaliyar Don Spater, and mother Dona Catherina Elizabeth Perera. (circa. 1902)

He was born in the village of Botale in the Hapitigam Korale on 20 October 1882, to Don Spater Senanayake (1847–1907) and Dona Catherina Elizabeth Perera Gunasekera Senanayake (1852–1949). Spater Senanayake had made his fortune in graphite mining and at the time he was expanding into plantations and investments in the arrack renting franchise, later he would be awarded the title of Mudaliyar for his philanthropy. F. R. Senanayake had an elder brother, Don Charles "D. C." Senanayake; a younger brother Don Stephen Senanayake and one sister, Maria Frances Senanayake who married F. H. Dias Bandaranaike.

Educated at S. Thomas' College, Mount Lavinia, Royal College, Colombo and Downing College, Cambridge, where he gained a BA and an LL.B. degree. Thereafter he became a barrister from the Lincoln's Inn, London in 1905.

== Law and business ==
On his return to Ceylon, he took oath as an Advocate in the Supreme Court of Ceylon and started a legal practice in the criminal courts. Soon becoming disenchanted with the legal profession, he focused on his family plantation and mining business. These were expanded to the holding of his wife's family after his marriage.

== Community leader ==
=== Colombo Municipal Council ===
An active social worker, F. R. Senanayake was elected to the Colombo Municipal Council from the Colpetty Ward in 1912. He retained his seat in the municipality until his death.

=== Temperance movement ===
The three Senanayake brothers were involved in the temperance movement formed in 1912, led by F. R. Senanayake. He was a founder of the Buddhist Theosophical Society with Colonel Henry Steel Olcott and became its president in 1914. The Temperance movement actively campaigned against the Excise Ordinance and the government practice of Arrack renting, auctioning liquor licenses to open taverns and sell liquor locally. The practice brought in revenue to government coffers and was a profitable business for tavern owners leading to many business families establishing themselves. However, it caused many social problems in local communities with whispered liquor addiction.

=== Arrest and imprisonment ===
When World War I broke out in 1914, the Senanayake brothers joined the Colombo Town Guard. The brothers were imprisoned without charges during the 1915 riots and faced the prospect of execution since the British Governor Sir Robert Chalmers considered the temperance movement as seditious and had its leaders imprisoned. He was released after 46 days on a bail bond.

=== Politics ===
Although capable of gaining membership to the Legislative Council of Ceylon, he didn't seek a seat in the Legislative Council. He stood for and was elected to the Colombo Municipal Council in 1912 and held the seat till his death. He formed the Lanka Mahajana Sabha and assisted in the formation of the Young Men's Buddhist Association. He was a strong supporter of his brother D. S. Senanayake being elected unopposed to the Legislative Council from Negombo in 1924.

== Death ==
He died on 1 January 1926, in Kolkata, India following an appendicitis operation. He was on a pilgrimage to Gaya when he became ill.

== Legacy ==
A statue of F. R. Senanayake has been erected in the Viharamahadevi Park facing the Colombo Town Hall. In the 2018 film Nidahase Piya DS about the life of his brother D S Senanayake, Palitha Silva played the role of FR Senanayake.

== Personal life ==
=== Family ===
He married Ellen Attygalle, the youngest daughter of Mudaliyar Don Charles Gemoris Attygalle and they had six children; Richard Gotabhaya, Fredrick Tissa, Phyllis Nedra "Girlie", Swarna Neela, Chandra Upali, Rupawathi. His eldest son Richard Gotabhaya Senanayake went on to become a member of parliament and a Cabinet minister. His eldest daughter Phyllis Nedra "Girlie", married Siripala Samarakkody and Swarna Neela married his brother's younger son Robert Parakrama Senanayake. His brother-in-laws included Colonel T. G. Jayewardene and John Kotelawala Sr. He supported his sister-in-law, Alice Kotelawala after she became destitute following the death of her husband John Kotelawala Sr. He educated and cared for his nephews John Kotelawala and Justin Kotelawala.

=== Residence ===
Grassmere was the town house of F. R. Senanayake and R. G. Senanayake. The house was built by F. R. Senanayake in the exclusive neighbourhood of Gregory's Road and moved in with his family from his family a rented home in Colombo. It was at Grassmere, that Senanayake was taken into custody under martial law by Punjabi soldiers during the 1915 riots. Following Senanayake's sudden death in 1926, the house was inherited by his son R. G. Senanayake. Gregory's Road was renamed R. G. Senanayake Mawatha in 2013. Today the house hosts the Colombo branch of the Goethe-Institut.

== See also ==
- List of political families in Sri Lanka
- Senanayake family
- History of Sri Lanka
- Don Stephen Senanayake
- Richard Gotabhaya Senanayake
- Dudley Senanayake
- Rukman Senanayake
