= Don Attygalle =

Don Attygalle may refer to:

- Don Sepala Attygalle (1921–2001), Sri Lankan army officer, civil servant and diplomat
- Don Charles Gemoris Attygalle (1836–1901), Ceylonese entrepreneur and mine owner
