= Justin Kotelawala =

Sri Lankan businessman (1904–1973)

Senator of Ceylon
- In office 1947-1954

Personal details
- Born: 22 August 1904
- Died: 2 April 1973 (aged 68)
- Party: United National Party
- Spouse: Millicent
- Children: Ayoma Wickremasinghe, Punyakante Wijenaike, Lalith Kotelawala
- Education: Royal College, Colombo, University of Cambridge
- Occupation: Business

Justin Kotelawala, CBE, JP (22 August 1904 - 2 April 1973) was a Sri Lankan businessman and senator. He was the former chairman of the Ceylinco Group.

== Early life and education ==
He was born to John Kotelawala, a police inspector turned businessman and Alice Elisabeth Kotelawala, daughter of Mudaliyar Don Charles Gemoris Attygalle, a wealthy land and mine owner. His elder brother was Sir John Kotelawala, the third Prime Minister of Sri Lanka and his sister was Freda Kotelawala.

The Kotelawalas lived in considerable comfort owing to the considerable land and mine holdings of his grandfather Mudaliyar Attygalle, which his father managed following the death of his grandfather. After he was forced out of the management of the Attygalle estates by the family, Kotelawala Snr started his own business ventures including the Ceylon-Japan Trading Company. In 1907, he was arrested and found guilty of conspiring to murder his brother-in-law, Francis Attygalle. While the murder trial was underway, Kotelawala Snr committed suicide by poisoning himself.

Kotelawala was three years old when his father died and with this, the family fortunes declined after much funds were spent on the legal defence of his father. Alice Kotelawala who had converted to Christianity slowly built up the family wealth through careful management of their remaining land holdings and the share of the Kahatagaha graphite mine, which she received from her younger sister Ellen and brother-in-law, Fredrick Richard Senanayake. F. R. Senanayake took a keen interest in the education of the Kotelawala children.

Justin Kotelawala was educated at the Royal College, Colombo and at the University of Cambridge, where he gained an MA.

== Business career ==
Kotelawala joined the mercantile sector, he served on the boards of Ceylon Insurance, Finance Company, Central Hospital, and Ceylon Tours and became the Chairman of the Ceylinco Group. He was a council member of the Ceylon National Chamber of Commerce. In 1953, he was awarded a CBE in the 1953 Coronation Honours for his services to commerce and had been appointed a Justice of the peace.

== Political career ==
Kotelawala was elected as a member of the Colombo Municipal Council from 1940 to 1944. In 1947, he was elected to the Senate of Ceylon and served until 1954. He was a founding member of the United National Party and served as its treasurer.

== Family ==
He married heiress Millicent de Silva, the only child of Sir Arthur Marcelles de Silva and Lady Laura Elizabeth de Silva in 1931. They had three children, A son Deshamanya Lalith Kotelawala and two daughters, the writer Punyakante Wijenaike and Ayoma Wickremasinghe. He died in London in 1973.

== See also ==
- List of political families in Sri Lanka
