= Arthur Marcelles de Silva =

Ceylonese surgeon

Sir Arthur Marcelles de Silva, KCMG, KBE, FRCS (5 November 1879 - 22 September 1957) was a Ceylonese surgeon. He was a member of the Public Service Commission.

== Early life and education ==
Born to Mudaliyar William Marcellus De Silva, he was educated at the Royal College, Colombo. Having missed by four marks the Ceylon Government University Scholarship for Oxbridge study in classics in 1898, he shifted to study in medicine and attended the London Hospital Medical College, becoming the first Ceylonese postgraduate student to gain Membership of the Royal College of Surgeons of England (MRCS) and Licentiate of the Royal College of Physicians (LRCP) in 1903. He was the first Ceylonese to gain Fellowship Royal College of Surgeons of England (FRCS) in December 1906.

== Medical career ==
Having practiced as an assistant to a general practitioner in the West End of London, he returned to Ceylon in 1907 joined the Colombo General Hospital as a junior physician and thereafter a surgeon and was promoted to senior surgeon in 1930. From 1908 to 1930, he served as an ENT surgeon at the Victoria Memorial Hospital. He lectured on surgery and clinical surgery at the Ceylon Medical College from 1907 to 1940. From 1940, he served as a consulting surgeon at Colombo General Hospital and Victoria Memorial Hospital. He served as a member of the Public Service Commission.

== Honors ==
He was awarded a Commander of the Order of the British Empire in the 1939 Birthday Honours, Knight Commander of the Order of the British Empire in the 1949 Birthday Honours and Knight Commander of the Most Distinguished Order of Saint Michael and Saint George in the 1956 New Year Honours. The Sir A. M. de Silva Oration is held annually in his memory.

== Family ==
He married Laura Elizabeth Dias in 1909 and they had one daughter, Millicent de Silva who married Justin Kotalawela, brother of Sir John Kotelawala. He died on 22 September 1957 at his home, 14 Ward Place, Colombo.
