= Alice Elisabeth Kotelawala =

Ceylonese businesswoman and philanthropist

Alice Elisabeth Kotelawala (née Attygalle), CBE was a Ceylonese businesswoman and philanthropist. She was the mother of Sir John Kotelawala, third Prime Minister of Ceylon.

She was born to Mudaliyar Don Charles Gemoris Attygalle, a wealthy land and mine owner, and Petronella Abeykoon, daughter of Fonseka Abeykoon. She was the eldest of four siblings. Her sister Lena married Colonel T. G. Jayewardene. Their son Major T. F. Jayewardene was a member of parliament, and Colonel Jayewardene's nephew J. R. Jayewardene became the President of Sri Lanka. Her youngest sister, Ellen, married F. R. Senanayake, a barrister and member of the Colombo Municipal Council. He initiated the Sri Lankan independence movement with his brother D. S. Senanayake, who became the first Prime Minister of Ceylon. Her only brother was Francis Dixon Attygalle.

She married John Kotelawala Snr, a police inspector against the wishes of her family. They had two sons, John Kotelawala and Justin Kotelawala and a daughter Freda, who married Dr. C.V.S. Corea, and was the mother of Dr Gamani Corea .

Kotelawala had converted to Christianity and became heavily involved in social service. She was awarded a MBE in the 1939 Birthday Honours and a CBE in the 1951 Birthday Honours.

== See also ==
- List of political families in Sri Lanka
