= Kahatagaha Graphite Mine =

Graphite mine in Sri Lanka

Coordinates: 7°34′30″N 80°32′46″E

- Location within Sri Lanka
- Location: Kahatagaha, North Western Province, Sri Lanka
- Products: Graphite
- Production: 811 t (798 long tons; 894 short tons)
- Financial year: 2016/2017
- Greatest depth: 610 m (2,000 ft)
- Opened: 1872; 154 years ago
- Company: Kahatagaha Graphite Lanka Limited
- Website: kgraphite.lk

Kahatagaha Graphite Mine (Sinhala: කහටගහ මිනිරන් පතල Kahatagaha Miniran Pathala) is a graphite mine located in the village of Kahatagaha in Dodangaslanda in Kurunegala District, North Western Province. It is one of the largest mines in Sri Lanka. Mining started in 1872, under a British owner and was purchased by Don Charles Gemoris Attygalle. It remained in the Attygalle family after the deaths of Don Charles Gemoris Attygalle and his son Francis Dixon Attygalle and was managed by D. S. Senanayake and John Kotelawala until it was nationalised in 1972. Its production dropped after it was taken over by the state due to corruption and mismanagement. Today its managed by the government owned Kahatagaha Graphite Lanka Limited.

== See also ==
- Graphite mining in Sri Lanka
