= Gamani Corea =

Sri Lankan economist, civil servant and diplomat (1925–2013)

Deshamanya Gamani Corea

Secretary-General of the United Nations Conference on Trade and Development
- In office 1974–1984
- Preceded by: Manuel Pérez-Guerrero
- Succeeded by: Alister McIntyre

Personal details
- Born: 4 November 1925 Ceylon
- Died: 3 November 2013 (aged 87) Colombo, Sri Lanka
- Education: Nuffield College, Oxford, Corpus Christi College, Cambridge, Royal College, Colombo
- Occupation: Civil Servant
- Profession: Economist; Diplomat

Deshamanya Gamani Corea (4 November 1925 – 3 November 2013) was a Sri Lankan economist, civil servant and diplomat. He was also the Secretary-General of the United Nations Conference on Trade and Development and Under-Secretary-General of the United Nations from 1974 to 1984, Ceylon's Ambassador to the EEC, Belgium, Luxembourg and the Netherlands, the Permanent Secretary of the Ministry of Planning and Economic Affairs of Ceylon and the Senior Deputy Governor of the Central Bank of Ceylon.

== Family ==
He was the son of C.V.S. Corea and Freda Corea, sister of Sir John Kotelawala, Prime Minister of Ceylon. Gamani Corea's grandfathers were the freedom fighter from Chilaw Victor Corea, who was a member of the Legislative Council of Ceylon, and John Kotelawala Snr. Vijaya Corea was his half-brother and Siva Obeyesekere his stepsister.

== Education ==
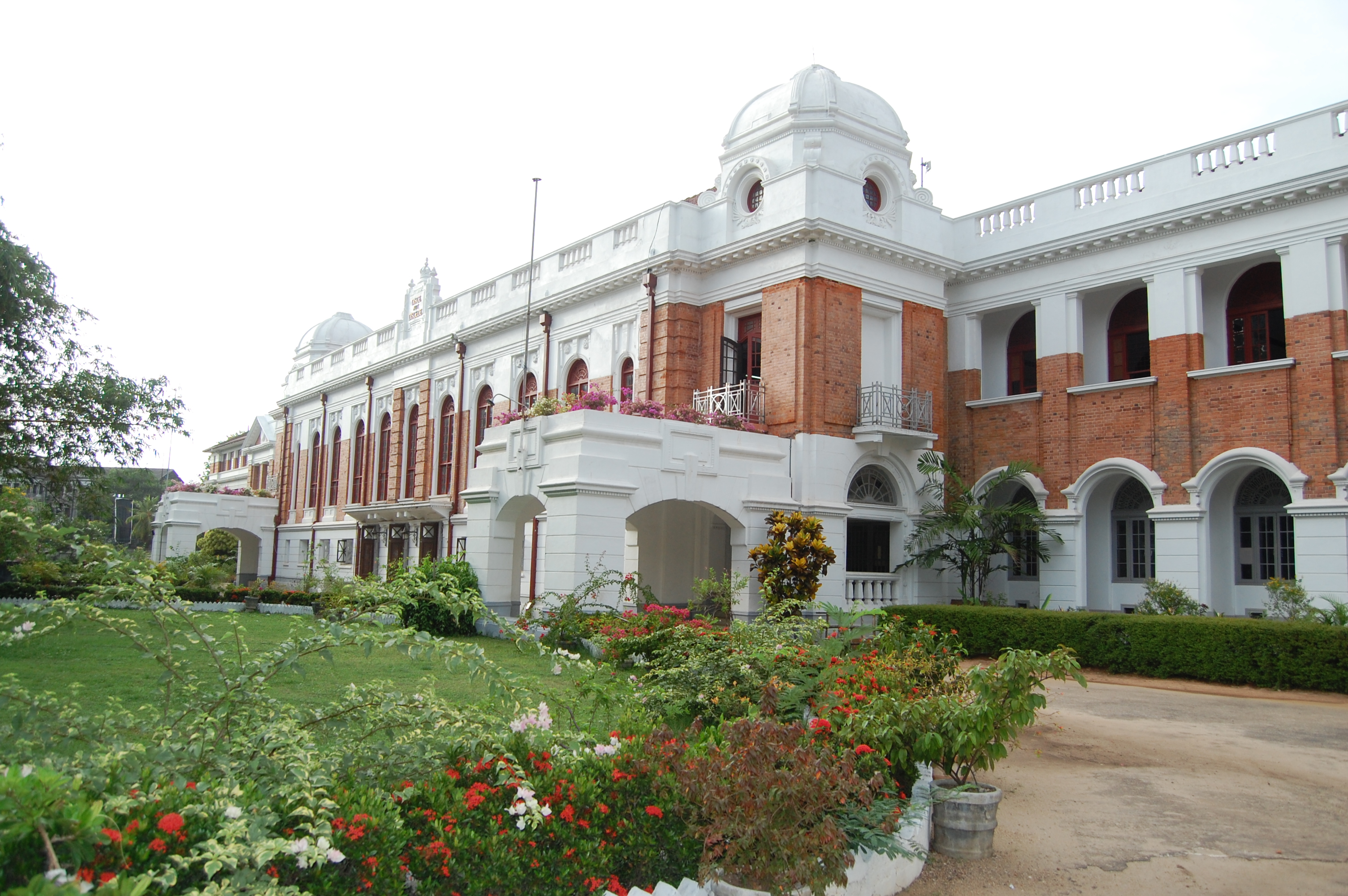
Corea was educated at the Royal College, Colombo.

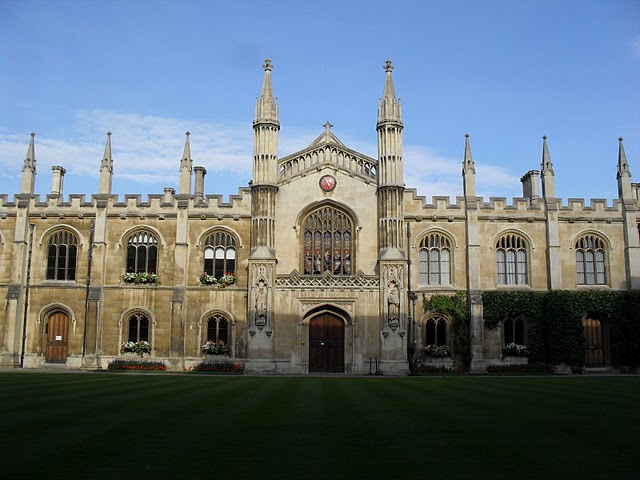
Dr. Gamani Corea attended both the Universities of Oxford and Cambridge. He studied at Corpus Christi College, Cambridge, and was an Honorary Fellow of the college.

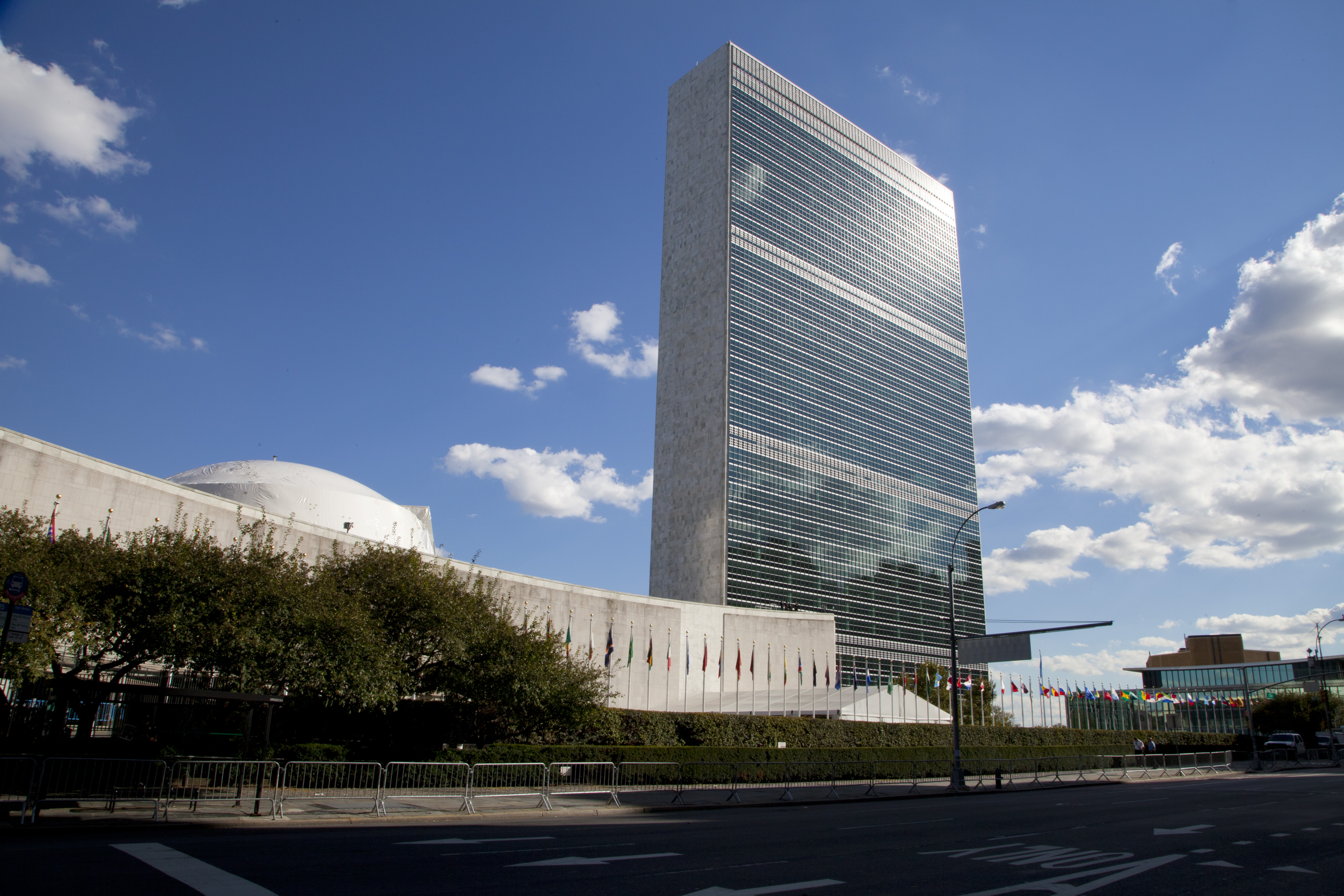
Dr. Gamani Corea was Secretary – General of UNCTAD and Assistant Secretary-General of the United Nations in New York City.

Gamani Corea was educated at the Royal College, Colombo, after which he started his higher education at the University of Ceylon in 1944, before going to study at Corpus Christi College, Cambridge, and Nuffield College, Oxford, from 1945 to 1952. There he obtained two BAs and MAs from both the University of Oxford and the University of Cambridge, and afterward a DPhil from Oxford.

He also received a doctorate (Honoris Causa) from the University of Nice; a DLitt (Hon) from the University of Colombo; and a DSc (Honoris Causa) from the University of Sri Jayewardenepura.

== Career ==
Corea returned to Ceylon briefly to work as a Research Officer at the Central Bank of Ceylon before leaving for Oxford to do his DPhil. He returned in 1952 to work as an economist and later the Director of Planning Secretariat of the Government of Ceylon in 1952 till 1960 at the same time functioning as the Secretary, National Planning Council.

From 1960 to 1964 he was the Director of Economic Research at the Central Bank and in 1965 was appointed the Permanent Secretary of the Ministry of Planning and Economic Affairs of the Government of Ceylon.

In 1970 he was transferred to the Central Bank as its Deputy Governor and later its Senior Deputy Governor till 1973 when he took up appointment as Ceylon's Ambassador to the European Economic Community, Belgium, Luxembourg and the Netherlands.

=== UN ===
He was a Member (1965–1972) and chairman (1972–1974) of United Nations Committee on Development Planning; chairman, ILO Meeting on Evaluation of Comprehensive Employment Missions to Colombia, Kenya, Iran and Sri Lanka, (1973); Chief, United Nations Planning Mission to British Honduras, (1962); Special Representative of the Secretary General of the UN Conference on Human Environment, ( 1971–1972); Secretary-General of the United Nations Conference on the Least Developed Countries, Paris, (1981); Member, UN Panel of Eminent Persons on South Africa and Transnational Corporations, (September 1985); Member, UN panel of Eminent Persons on "The Relationship between Disarmament and Development", (April 1986); Team Leader, UNDP High Level Multi-Disciplinary Mission to Qatar, (13–26 April 1987); Chairman: United Nations General Assembly: Ad Hoc Committee of the Whole on an International Development Strategy for the Fourth Development Decade, (1989–90);

=== UNCTAD secretary-general ===
Corea assumed post of Secretary-General of the United Nations Conference on Trade and Development on 5 April 1974 after he was appointed in 1973 for an initial term of three years by former United Nations Secretary-General Kurt Waldheim. He was thereafter re-appointed three times, his fourth term covering the period December 1982 until the end of 1984. As Secretary-General of UNCTAD and until the end of February 1985, Dr. Corea also held the position of Under-Secretary-General of the United Nations.

== Later work ==
Following his departure from the UN he founded the Sri Lanka Economics Association; was the Chairman of the South Centre Working Groups on Environment and Development and a board member of the South Centre.

He held several positions, including the Chancellor of the Open University of Sri Lanka; Honorary Fellow, Corpus Christi College, Cambridge; Honorary Fellow, Institute of Development Studies, University of Sussex; chairman, Board of Governors, Institute of Policy Studies; Honorary Fellow, Bandaranaike Centre for International Studies; Fellow, National Academy of Science of Sri Lanka; Honorary President, Association of Former Civil Servants, Sri Lanka; Senior Adviser to the Ministry of Foreign Affairs; Joint Patron, Sri Lanka Economics Association; Patron, Symphony Orchestra of Sri Lanka.

== Awards ==
- Order of the Yugoslav Flag with sash (I. rank), for the promotion of international understanding – Government of Yugoslavia, 1985;
- Title of Deshamanya from the Government of Sri Lanka, First Honours list, Independence Day, 4 February 1986;
- Award for International Understanding – Sahabdeen Foundation .

=== Honorary degrees ===
He has received several honorary degrees;

- France University of Nice – Doctor (Honoris Causa)
- Sri Lanka University of Colombo – DLitt (Honoris Causa)
- Sri Lanka University of Sri Jayewardenepura – DSc(Honoris Causa)

== See also ==
- Sri Lankan Non Career Diplomats
- List of Sri Lankan non-career Permanent Secretaries

Diplomatic posts
Preceded by Manuel Pérez-Guerrero	Secretary General of the United Nations Conference on Trade and Development; 1974–1984	Succeeded by Alister McIntyre
