= Lanka Mahajana Sabha =

Lanka Mahajana Sabha was a Ceylonese political party founded by F. R. Senanayake in 1919. It was affiliated to the United National Party in 1946 and played an important role in attainment of Sri Lanka's independence in 1948. Its members included the first prime minister of Ceylon, Don Stephen Senanayake, his brother Don Charles Senanayake, Sir Don Baron Jayatilaka, Sir Wilfred de Soysa, Dr. Charles Alwis Hewavitharana and others. Henry Woodward Amarasuriya was the president of the party for 44 years.

== See also ==
- Ceylon National Congress
- Sri Lankan independence movement
