= Punyakante Wijenaike =

Sri Lankan writer (born 1933)

Punyakante Wijenaike (born Colombo, 1933- 8 March 2023) was a Sri Lankan writer. In 1977, she was described as "one of the most underestimated fiction writers currently at work in the English language."

== Work ==
Wijenaike wrote primarily in English, including fiction, short stories and anthologies. Her first collection of short stories, The Third Woman, was published in 1963. She later published four more collections of short stories and six novels, with more than 100 stories published in newspapers, journals and anthologies in Sri Lanka and abroad; had her works were broadcast in Sri Lanka and on the BBC.

Although she spent most of her life in Colombo, she initially used rural villages as her theme, only later turning to urban themes. Her writings highlight "the tyranny of community or a group towards its weaker members." Her 1998 novel, An Enemy Within, uncovers "the mask that tend[s] to hide the reality of present times."

Her novel Giraya was adapted into a teledrama by Independent Television Network of Sri Lanka.

== Awards and recognition ==
- Women of Achievement Award, 1985
- Kala Suri Class 1 (literary achievement), conferred by the Government of Sri Lanka, 1988
- 1994 Gratiaen Prize for her novel Amulet
- 1996, joint winner of the Commonwealth Short Story Competition for Radio

Ten of her works are held by the U.S. Library of Congress.

== Books ==
=== Novels ===
- 1998: An Enemy Within, uncovers
- 2011: Giraya
- Amulet
- The Waiting Earth
- 2010: When Guns Fall Silent
- The Rebel
- 2009: That deep silence
- To Follow the Sun
- Unbinding: A Story of Rebirth and Other Stories
- Anoma
- 1972: The Betel Wine

=== Short stories ===
- 2004: Missing in Action;Sunset Years
- 1963: The Third Women

== Personal life ==
She is the daughter of Justin Kotelawala, a businessman and senator of Colombo and his wife Millicent da Silva. Her brother is Deshamanya Lalith Kotelawala. She spent most of her life in Colombo, where she published all her works.
