= Kandawala =

Coordinates: 6°49′N 79°53′E

- Kandawala and the statue of General Sir John Kotelawala

General information
- Location: Ratmalana, Colombo, Sri Lanka
- Construction started: Unknown
- Client: Sir John Lionel Kotelawala, General Sir John Kotelawala Defence University

Kandawala was the home of General Sir John Lionel Kotelawala CH KBE LLD (4 April 1897 - 2 October 1980) was a Sri Lankan politician, most notable for serving as Prime Minister of Ceylon from 1953 to 1956. The house is located in a 19-hectare (48-acre) estate that includes a lake known as Kandawala lake.

John Kotelawala bought Kandawala estate with its small three bed-roomed house in 1920 at a public auction. In 1926, Kandawala built a two-story main house as his primary residence and office. This is known as Kandawala Valava, and it is the design of an expert architect, Siribaddhana Divithotavala, who designed the Demodara Nine Arch Bridge and Horagolla Valava.

The main house was built by Kotelawala in 1926. He moved in soon after its completion.

During World War II, the house was used as the station headquarters and officers mess for the RAF based at the Ratmalana Airport.

Kotelawala remained at Kandawala even after he became Prime Minister and did not move into Temple Trees. He carried out much state business from his office in Kotelawala.

After his death, in accordance with Sir John's last-will, Kandawala Estate was handed over to the Sri Lankan military to be turned into a Tri-Service Defence Academy. In 1985 the Sri Lankan Government established General Sir John Kotelawala Defence Academy at Kandawala named after him, it was renamed General Sir John Kotelawala Defence University in 2007.
