= D. S. Senanayake =

Prime Minister of Ceylon from 1947 to 1952

The Right Honourable Don Stephen Senanayake PC
- දොන් ස්ටීවන් සේනානායක டி. எஸ். சேனநாயக்கா
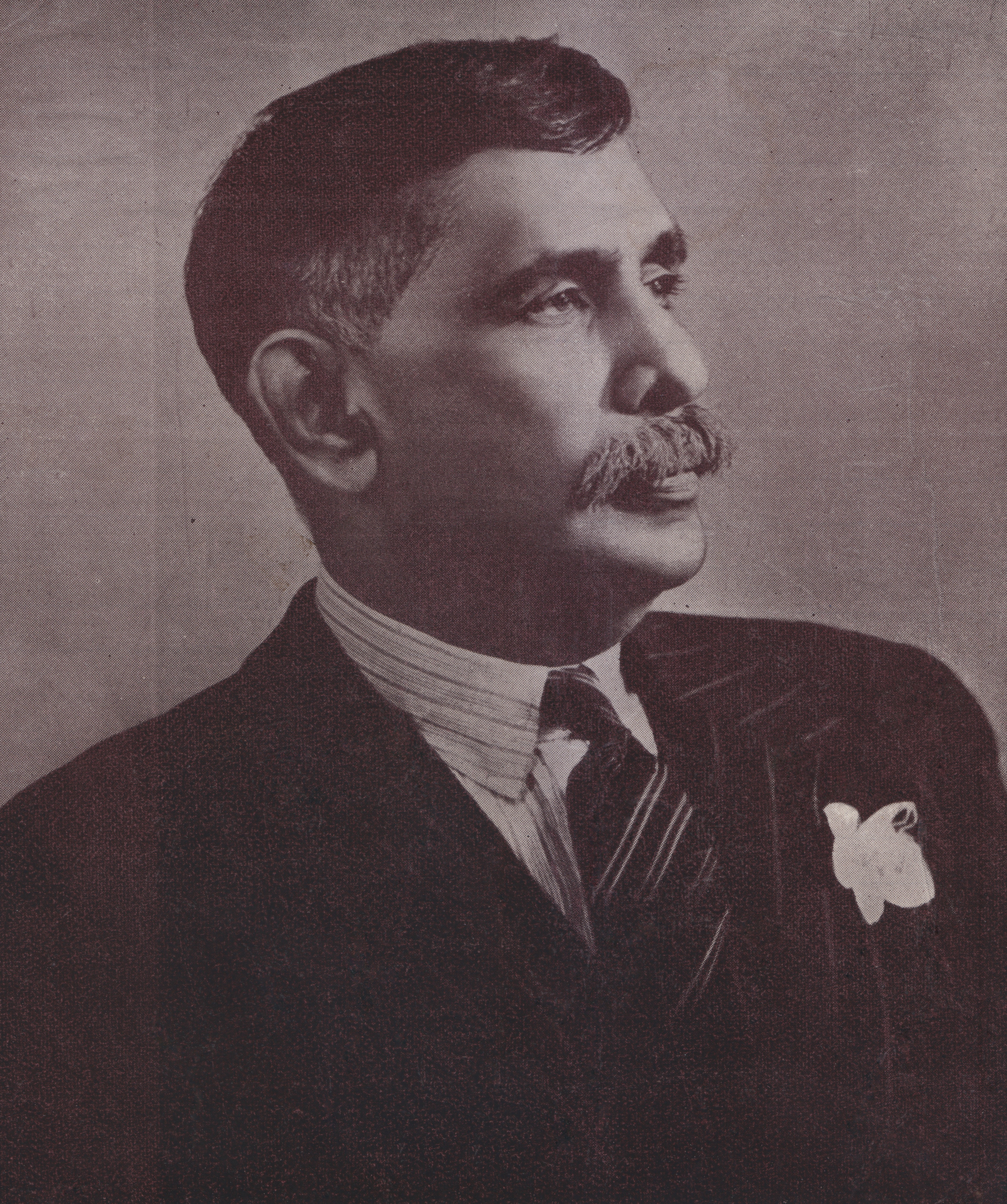
- Senanayake in 1934

1st Prime Minister of Ceylon
- In office 24 September 1947 – 22 March 1952
- Monarchs: George VI; Elizabeth II
- Governors General: Henry Monck-Mason Moore; Herwald Ramsbotham, 1st Viscount Soulbury
- Preceded by: Position established
- Succeeded by: Dudley Senanayake

Leader of the House
- In office 2 December 1942 – 4 July 1947
- Preceded by: Don Baron Jayatilaka
- Succeeded by: S. W. R. D. Bandaranaike

Minister of Agriculture and Lands
- In office 1931–1946
- Preceded by: Post created
- Succeeded by: Dudley Senanayake

Member of the Ceylon Parliament for Mirigama
- In office 14 October 1947 – 22 March 1952
- Preceded by: Constituency Created
- Succeeded by: John Amaratunga

Personal details
- Born: 20 October 1884 Botale, Mirigama, Ceylon
- Died: 22 March 1952 (aged 67) Colombo, Ceylon
- Party: United National Party
- Spouse: Molly Dunuwila
- Children: 2, including Dudley
- Parent: Don Spater Senanayake (father)
- Relatives: Senanayake family
- Education: S. Thomas' College, Mount Lavinia
- Occupation: Planter; businessman; politician

Don Stephen Senanayake PC (Sinhala: දොන් ස්ටීවන් සේනානායක; Tamil: டி. எஸ். சேனநாயக்கா; 20 October 1884 – 22 March 1952) was a Ceylonese statesman. He was the first Prime Minister of Ceylon, having emerged as the leader of the Sri Lankan independence movement that led to the establishment of self-rule in Ceylon. He is considered as the "Father of the Nation".

Born to an entrepreneur from the village of Botale, Senanayake was educated at S. Thomas' College, Mutwal before briefly working as a clerk in the Surveyor General's Department. Joining the family business, he managed the family estates and the Kahatagaha Graphite Mine. Along with his brothers, Senanayake became active in the temperance movement which grew into the independence movement following 1915 Sinhalese-Muslim riots, in which the Senanayake brothers were imprisoned without charges for 46 days. He was elected unopposed in 1924 to the Legislative Council of Ceylon from Negombo, becoming the Secretary of the unofficial members group of the Legislative Council. In 1931, he was elected to the State Council of Ceylon, where he served as Minister of Agriculture and Lands. He was elected to the first Parliament of Ceylon forming a government and serving as Ceylon's first Prime Minister from 1947 until his death in 1952.

== Early life and education ==
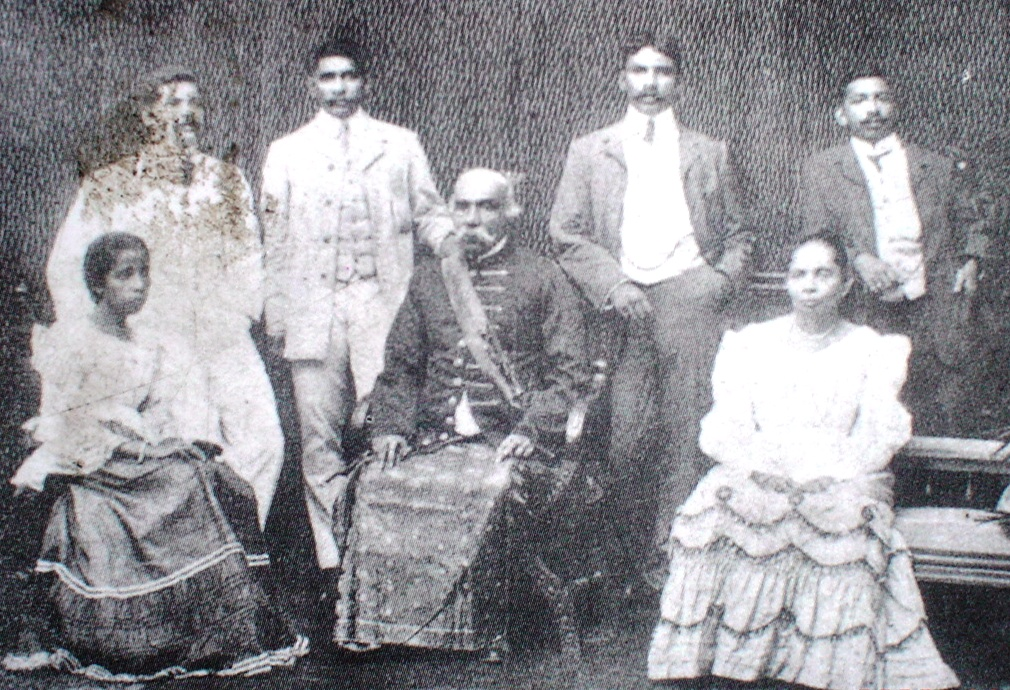
The Senanayake family

He was born in the village of Botale in the Hapitigam Korale (currently known as Mirigama) on 20 October 1884 to Don Spater Senanayake (1847–1907) and Dona Catherina Elizabeth Perera Gunasekera Senanayake (1852–1949). Spater Senanayake had made his fortune in graphite mining and at the time he was expanding into plantations and investments in the arrack renting franchise. Later he would be awarded the title of Mudaliyar for his philanthropy. Stephen Senanayake had two elder brothers, Don Charles "D. C." Senanayake and Fredrick Richard "F. R." Senanayake; and one sister, Maria Frances Senanayake who married F. H. Dias Bandaranaike.

Brought up in a devout Buddhist family, he entered the prestigious Anglican school S. Thomas' College, Mutwal. Never a studious student, he excelled in sports playing cricket and played in the Royal-Thomian. He later played cricket for the Sinhalese Sports Club and Nondescripts Cricket Club. His contemporaries at S. Thomas's includes D. R. Wijewardena, Sir Paul Pieris, Sir Arthur Wijewardena and Sir Francis Molamure.

== Early career ==
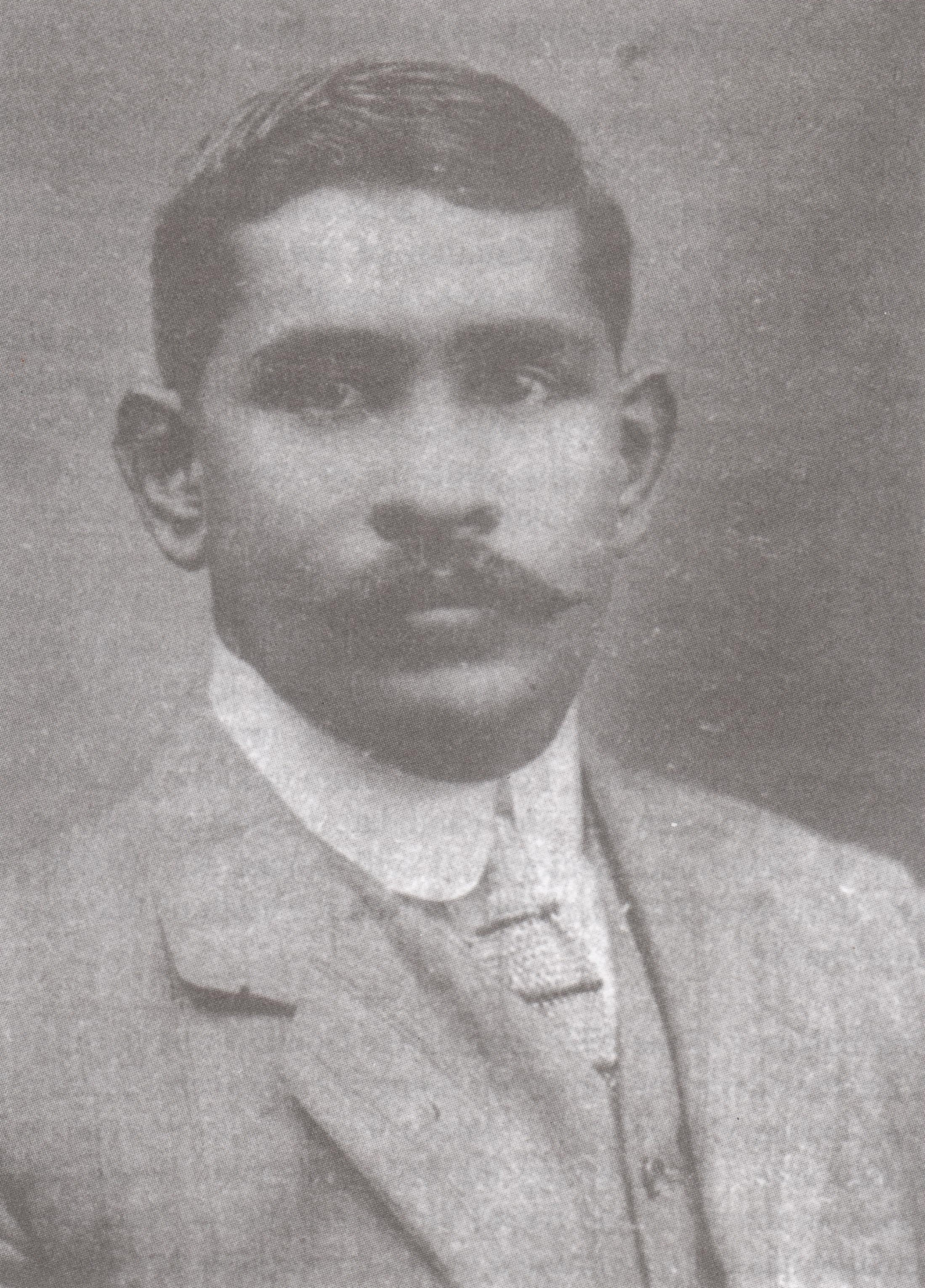
A young D. S. Senanayake

After completing schooling, he worked as a clerk in the Surveyor General's Department but left after a period of apprenticing. He joined his brother D. C. Senanayake in running his father's extensive business holdings. He worked as a planter, introducing the new commercial crop of rubber to the family plantations. He managed the Kahatagaha Graphite Mine, which was owned by his brother F. R. Senanayake wife's family. F. R. Senanayake had married the youngest daughter of Mudaliyar Don Charles Gemoris Attygalle. He was a member of the Low-Country Products Association and of the Orient Club. In 1914, he was appointed as a member of a government commission sent to Madagascar to study and report on their graphite mining industry.

== Political career ==
=== Early political activism ===
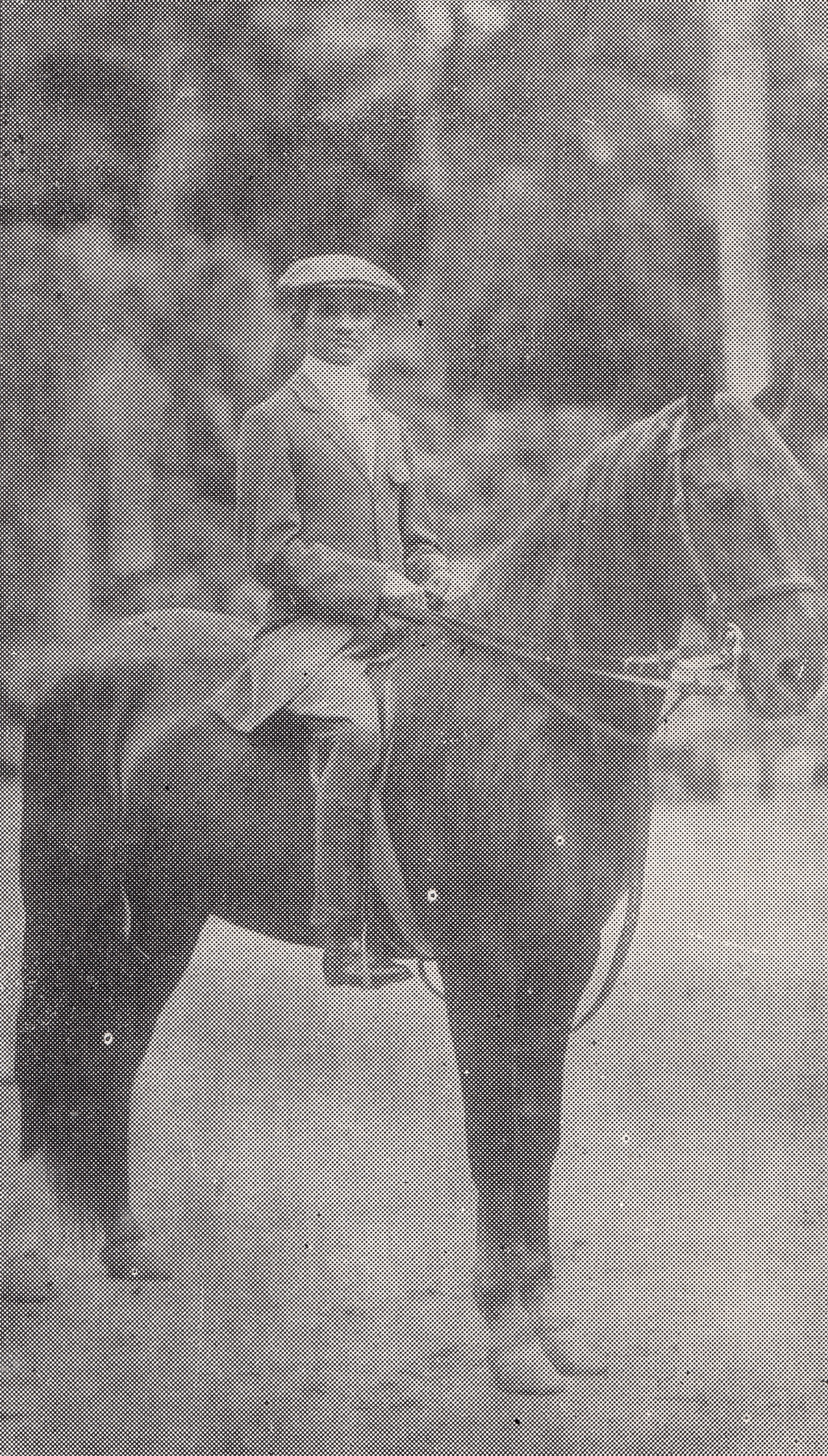
Henry Pedris, a captain in the Colombo Town Guard, was executed by the British on the account of treason.

The three Senanayake brothers were involved in the temperance movement formed in 1912. When World War I broke out in 1914 they joined the Colombo Town Guard. The brothers were arrested and imprisoned without charges during the 1915 riots. They faced the prospect of execution, since the British Governor Sir Robert Chalmers considered the temperance movement as seditious. He was released on a bail bound after 46 days at the Welikada Prison without charges. The heavy-handed suppression of the riots by the British colonial authorities initiated the modern independence movement led by the educated middle class. Don Stephen and Don Charles were prominent members of the political party Lanka Mahajana Sabha. Fredrick Richard and Don Charles were committed supporters of the Young Men's Buddhist Association. D. S. Senanayake played an active role in the independence movement, initially in support of his brother Fredrick Richard.

=== Legislative Council ===
In 1924, Senanayake was elected unopposed to the Legislative Council of Ceylon from Negombo. He became the Secretary (similar to a whip) of the unofficial members group of the Legislative Council, activity engaged in proceedings with a particular interest in subjects related to agriculture, lands, and irrigation. He questioned in the Legislative Council the biased policies of the colonial administration in the plantain industry, the cost overruns of the Batticaloa line and the Trincomalee line, the delays in the Norton Bridge Dam, and advocated for the establishment of the first university in the island close to Kandy. In 1927, he acted on behalf of Gerard Wijeyekoon in the Executive Council. When his brother F.R. died on a pilgrimage to Buddha Gaya in 1925, Don Stephen assumed his leadership of the independence movement.

=== State Council of Ceylon ===
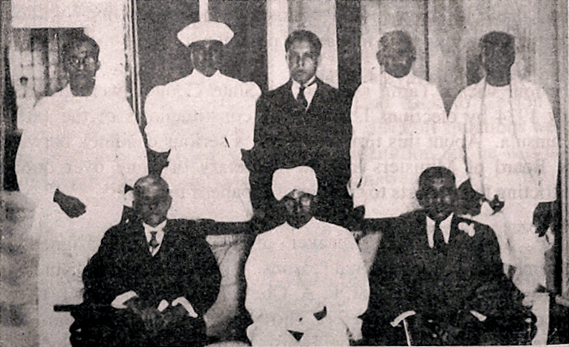
Ministers of the Second State Council of Ceylon with the Speaker in 1936

In 1931 he was elected to the newly formed State Council of Ceylon representing the Ceylon National Congress. At the first siting of the State Council, he was elected as Minister of Agriculture and Lands to chair the state council committee on Agriculture and Lands.

==== Minister of Agriculture and Lands ====
As Minister of Agriculture and Lands, he initiated a policy that effectively combated Ceylon's agricultural problems, established the Land Development Ordinance, and introduced an agricultural policy to counter Ceylon's rice problems. This policy earned him respect of many, and he continued to be a minister for fifteen years, having been re-elected in 1936. He also enforced a productivity programme of "Agricultural Modernisation". He introduced the Land Bill, expanded the co-operative movement in Ceylon, and assisted in the founding of the Bank of Ceylon. In 1938, he introduced the Flora and Fauna Protection Ordinance, establishing the Yala National Park. In 1940, following a heated discussion with the Governor which resulted from the Inspector General of Police refusing to follow a request by the Minister of Home Affairs, Senanayake gave his resignation, which was followed by the other Ministers. The resignations were withdrawn shortly following settlement with the Governor.

==== World War II ====
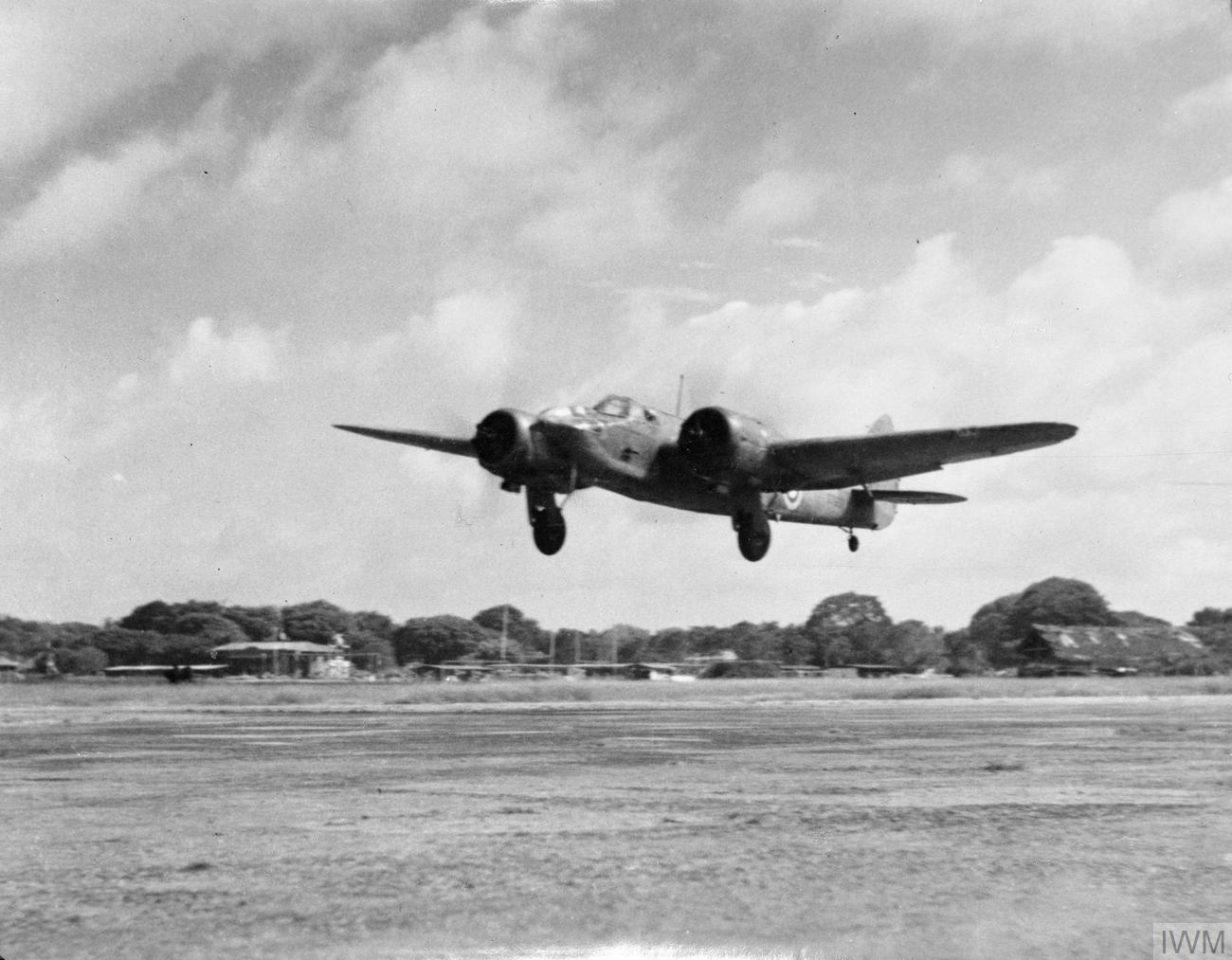
An RAF Bristol Blenheim bomber takes off from Colombo Racecourse in Ceylon during the war.

At the onset of World War II in the far east, on 1 December 1941 a Civil Defence Department was formed with Oliver Goonetilleke as Commissioner. D. S. Senanayake, as Minister of Agriculture and Lands and a member of the Ceylon war council took an active role in food supply and control. He was tasked with many defence projects, including rapid construction of an airfield at the Colombo Racecourse, which he achieved, making it available for the defence of Ceylon during the Easter Sunday Raid.

During this time a close relationship developed between Senanayake and the deputy commissioner of civil defence, Dr. Ivor Jennings, who was the principal of the Ceylon University College. Dr. Jennings, an expert on constitutional law, subsequently became Senanayake's adviser on constitutional reforms aimed at gaining independence for the island.

==== Gaining independence ====
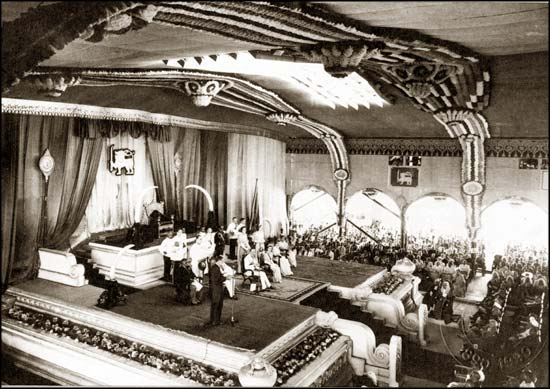
The formal ceremony marking the start of self-rule, with the opening of the first parliament at Independence Square by Prince Henry, Duke of Gloucester in the presence of D. S. Senanayake as first Prime Minister of Ceylon

In December 1942, Senanayake became the Leader of the House and Vice Chairman of the Board of Ministers in the State Council, upon the retirement of Sir Baron Jayatilaka, Minister of Home Affairs. On 26 May 1943, the British Government made the Whitehall Declaration of 1943 on Ceylon constitutional change, which enabled ministers to make submissions. This bypassed the Governor, who called for a commission from the colonial office to halt the activities of the ministers. Senanayake resigned from the National Congress disagreeing with its resolution on independence and instead approached the commission with his proposal of dominion status and they accepted the ministers' submissions, publishing these in the Sessional Paper XIV of 1944. In 1944, the Soulbury Commission was formed. In 1945, he proceeded to London to meet the Secretary of State for the Colonies, Oliver Stanley. On his arrival in London, he met instead the newly appointed George Hall, who had succeeded Stanley following Labour's win in the 1945 general election. He resigned his ministry in 1946 to push for full independence. That year he formed the United National Party (UNP) by amalgamating three right-leaning pro-Dominion parties.

The granting of independence to India in 1947 and the appointment of Arthur Creech Jones as Colonial Secretary gave a new window for Senanayake to push for his case, using the new constitution that was recommended by the Soulbury Commission. In the negotiations that followed, the British government accepted Senanayake's proposals for constitutional change and self-rule. Senanayake presented the Soulbury Constitution to the State Council which voted it in, with only three votes against it.

Parliamentary elections were held from 23 August – 20 September 1947. Senanayake was contested for the first time in the Mirigama electorate, having been elected uncontested in all previous elections. He won the seat by a majority of over 16,000 votes against Edmund Samarakkody of the Bolshevik–Leninist Party of India, Ceylon and Burma. Senanayake's party, the UNP, fell short of a majority at the general election but was able to form a government in coalition with the All Ceylon Tamil Congress.

On 24 September 1947 he was invited by the Governor General of Ceylon Sir Henry Moore to form the island's first cabinet as its first Prime Minister. On 11 November 1947, Senanayake and Sir Henry signed agreements between Ceylon and Britain including a defence pact and public service agreements that paved the way for independence of Ceylon. The "Independence Bill of Ceylon" was passed in December 1947. On 4 February 1948, Ceylon marked its independence with a ceremonial opening of parliament.

== First prime minister ==
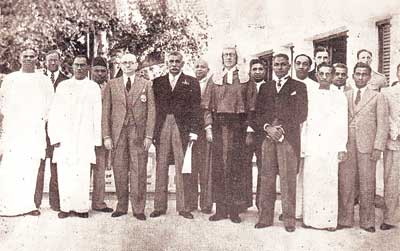
D. S. Senanayake as Prime Minister with his Cabinet

With his accession, Senanayake began the process of establishing institutions needed for an independent state. While most domestic institutions existed, Ceylon remained dependent on Britain for trade, defence and external affairs. He turned down a knighthood but maintained good relations with Britain and was the first Ceylonese to be appointed to the Privy Council in 1950.

=== National development ===
He boldly made plans to spread out the population, and his Gal Oya scheme relocated over 250,000 people. He expanded the agrarian policies he had initiated during his tenure as Minister of Agriculture and Lands, a post now held by his son Dudley Senanayake. With a rapidly expanding population and food shortages faced during the war, Senanayake aimed to increase local food production to be self-sustainable. Renovation of sites of historic importance in Anuradhapura and Polonnaruwa took place at this time. Senanayake also proposed expansion of hydro-electric power in the island.

=== Citizenship ===
Senanayake's government introduced the Ceylon Citizenship Act which was passed by parliament on 20 August 1948 and became law on 15 November 1948. Only about 5,000 Indian Tamils qualified for citizenship. More than 700,000 people, about 11% of the population, were denied citizenship and made stateless. The bill had been opposed fiercely in Parliament by the Ceylon Indian Congress, which represented the Indian Tamils, and the Sinhalese leftist parties, as well as the All Ceylon Tamil Congress, which represented the Sri Lankan Tamils, including its leader G.G. Ponnambalam. This was followed by the Indian and Pakistani Residents (Citizenship) Act No.3 of 1949 and the Ceylon (Parliamentary Elections) Amendment Act No.48 of 1949.

=== Foreign policy ===
Senanayake held the portfolio of Ministry of External Affairs and Defence. He developed Ceylon's post-independence foreign policy, establishing formal relations with foreign nations. Initially gaining membership of the Commonwealth and establishing diplomatic ties other member countries, he established diplomatic relations with the United States and Japan. He established the Ceylon Overseas Service to build a cadre of career diplomats. He hosted the Commonwealth Conference of Foreign Ministers, held in Colombo in January 1950. One of the significant outcomes of this conference was the establishment of the Colombo Plan.

=== Defence ===
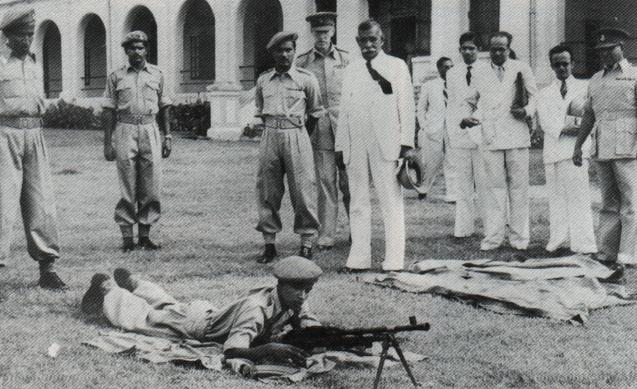
D. S. Senanayake visiting the 1st battalion of the CLI at the Echelon Square

Although Ceylon had maintained a small volunteer force for the defense of colony, Senanayake introduced the Army Act (1949), Navy Act (1950), and the Air Force Act (1951) establishing the Armed forces of Ceylon. Having engaged in Defence Agreement with Britain when gaining independence, Senanayake retained British bases in Ceylon and gained her assistance in training and arming its new military.

=== Political challenges ===
In the early years of Senanayake's premiership he faced opposition and a lot of criticism from many of the leftist parties. He soon had difficulties with one of the strongest members of his cabinet and leader of the largest factions of his party, S. W. R. D. Bandaranaike. Bandaranaike joined his Sinhala Maha Sabha in forming the UNP in 1947, having given the impression that Senanayake would soon retire and he would succeed him. With no signs of Senanayake retiring and conflicts with Senanayake on hardline nationalist policies he had, in 1951, Bandaranaike resigned from his posts, dissolved the Sinhala Maha Sabha, and established the Sri Lanka Freedom Party (SLFP). Senanayake assumed the portfolio of Health and Local Government held by Bandaranaike and began countering his break in parliament for the next few months.

== Death ==
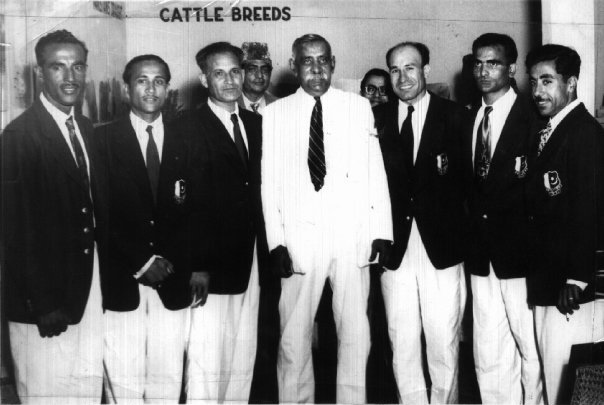
Senanayake pictured with the Pakistan national football team during the 1952 Asian Quadrangular Football Tournament, few days before his death

On the morning of Friday, 21 March 1952, Don Stephen Senanayake took his usual pre-breakfast ride on Galle Face Green, a short distance from his official residence Temple Trees. He was riding one of his favorite horses, Chitra, a mare belonging to the mounted police. Accompanying him on that day was Sir Richard Aluwihare, the IGP; G.G. Ponnambalam, a cabinet minister, and Inspector Eddie Grey. The horse broke into a gallop from a canter and went on for a mile, when suddenly the Prime Minister fell off the saddle.

He was taken to a nursing home where he remained unconscious for the next thirty-two hours. It was believed that he had suffered a stroke. He was treated by Dr. M. V. P. Pieris, Ceylon's seniormost surgeon, and a team of Professors from the University of Manitoba who had been visiting Ceylon as part of a WHO medical mission. A radio message was sent for Sir Hugh Cairns, who decided to fly out to Ceylon to attend the Prime Minister. Winston Churchill ordered an RAF Hastings with a double crew to take Sir Hugh. However, the aircraft, with three more doctors and two nurses, was taxiing to take off when the message was received that it was too late, as the Prime Minister's situation was deteriorating. Two more neurosurgeons from India and Pakistan had reached Colombo too late to make a difference. Senanayake died at 3:30 pm on 22 March 1952. His death also occurred amidst the inaugural 1952 Asian Quadrangular Football Tournament held in Ceylon, and the match between Burma and Ceylon in 22 March had to be cancelled.

His remains were taken to Temple Trees, where they lay until the next morning, when they were moved to the House of Representatives to lay in state, with over half a million persons showing their respects. His state funeral followed with over 32,000 people taking part in the funeral procession and with the stage barring the coffin drawn by sailors of the Royal Ceylon Navy. The procession ended at Independence Square where the remains were cremated in accordance with Sinhalese Buddhist rites.

== Personal life ==
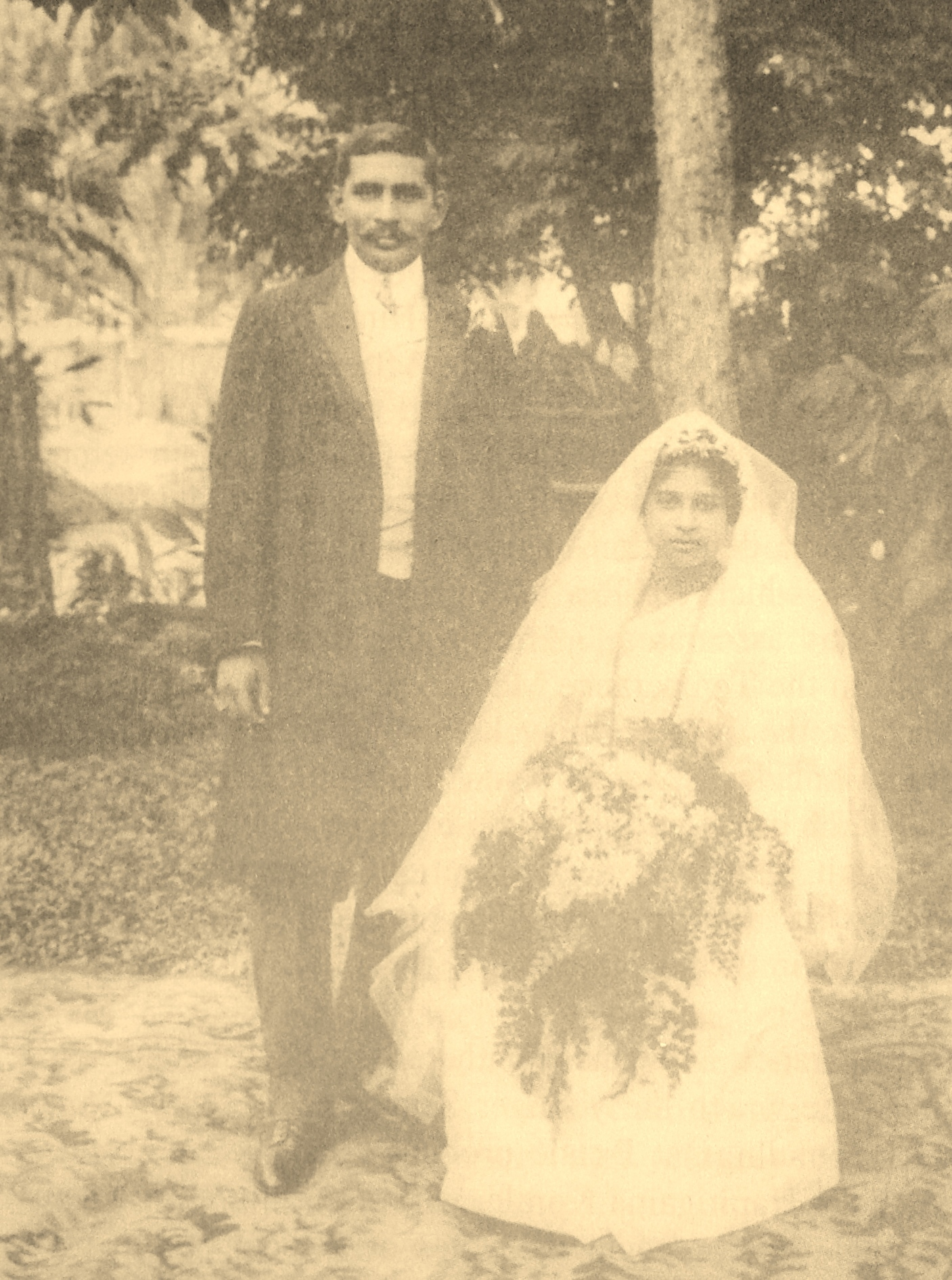
Wedding of D. S. Senanayake and Mollie Dunuwille in 1910

Senanayake cared for animals and owned a wide range of pets such as elephants, horses, pigs, cattle; many kept at his estate and at the Bothale Walawwa. A keen horticulturist, he grew orchids and would typically wear an orchid in the lapel of his suit. He suffered from diabetes most of his later life.

=== Marriage and children ===
D. S. Senanayake married Molly Dunuwila in 1910. She was the daughter of R. R. Dunuwila, then secretary of the Colombo Municipal Council and Grace Jayatilaka, daughter of Frederick Jayatilaka of the Ceylon Civil Service and District Judge of Kalutara. They had two sons, Dudley Shelton Senanayake (19 June 1911 – 13 April 1973) and Robert Parakrama Senanayake (8 April 1913 – 26 April 1986). His eldest son, Dudley Shelton Senanayake, succeeded him as Prime Minister in 1952, followed by his nephew, Sir John Kotelawala (1897–1980) in 1953, but this nine-year family dynasty ended with the landslide victory of Solomon West Ridgeway Dias Bandaranaike in 1956, campaigning under the "Sinhala Only" slogan. Dudley Senanayake regained the premiership briefly in 1960, and served again from 1965 until he was defeated by Sirimavo Bandaranaike in 1970. Rukman Senanayake, one of his grandsons, served as a cabinet minister and member of parliament. Two of his great-grandsons, Vasantha Senanayake, and Ruwan Wijewardene, served as state ministers and members of parliament.

== Legacy ==
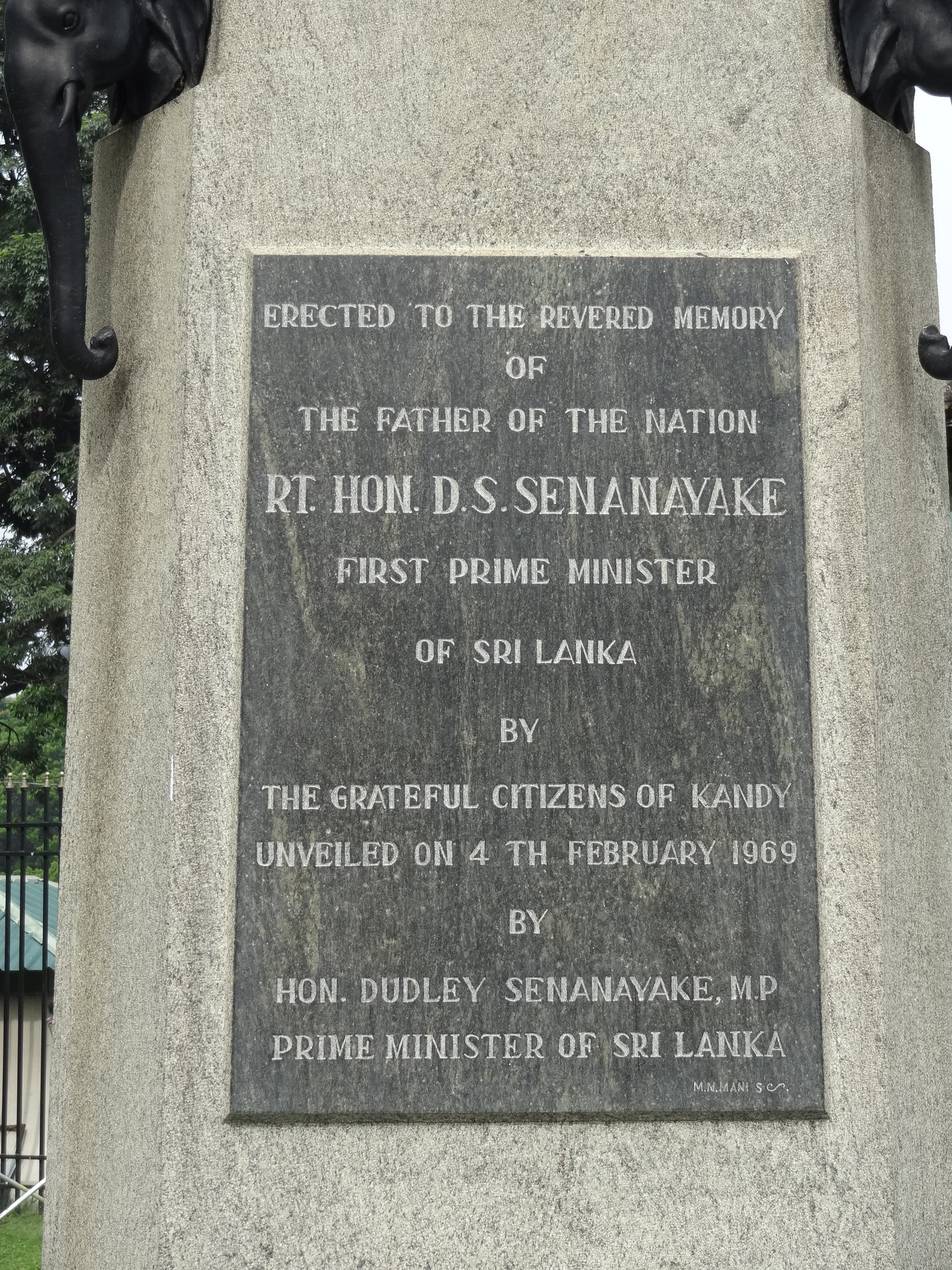
Statue of D. S. Senanayake erected in Kandy in 1969

D. S. Senanayake is respected by Sinhalese and some Muslims. However, Tamils were not happy with his citizenship laws, which disenfranchised virtually all Tamils of recent Indian origin living in the central highlands. His bold agricultural plans and pro-Western policies drew criticism for their modern and untraditional nature. Under his family's leadership, Sri Lanka's economy flourished, and he is still known as "The Father of Sri Lanka".

Statues of D. S. Senanayake have been erected in many parts of the island, including one at the Independence Memorial Hall and at the Old Parliament Building, Colombo. The lake created by the Gal Oya Dam has been named as the Senanayake Samudraya after him. Many schools, libraries and public buildings have been named in his honor and the Rt Hon D S Senanayake Memorial Shield is awarded at the Royal–Thomian in which he played for S. Thomas' in 1901 and 1902.

D. S. Senanayake Statue at Temple of the Tooth

== Electoral history ==
Electoral history of D. S. Senanayake
Election	Constituency	Party	Votes	Result
1924 legislative council	Negombo	Independent	Uncontested	Elected
1931 state council	Negombo	Independent		Elected
1936 state council	Negombo	Independent		Elected
1947 parliamentary	Mirigama	United National Party	26,762	Elected

== See also ==
- List of political families in Sri Lanka
- Nidahase Piya DS, a biographical film based on DS's life

Government offices
Preceded by –	Prime Minister of Ceylon; 1947–1952	Succeeded by Dudley Senanayake
