= Kahatagaha =

- Village
- Location within Sri Lanka
- Country: Sri Lanka
- Province: North Western Province
- District: Kurunegala
- Time zone: UTC+5:30 (Sri Lanka Standard Time)

Kahatagaha is a village in the Kurunegala District, North Western Province, Sri Lanka. The village is located 14.5 km (9.0 mi) north-west of Matale and 32.5 km (20.2 mi) north north-west of Kandy.

It is the site of the Kahatagaha Graphite Mine, which is one of the largest graphite mines in the country.

== See also ==
- List of towns in Central Province, Sri Lanka
