= Temperance movement in Sri Lanka =

The Temperance movement in Sri Lanka was motivated by Buddhism and anti-colonialism.

It was also a front line organisation in the National Independence Movement. Most of the early officers of the society were pioneers in gaining independence and "the Temperance Movement was identified as the foundation for the independence struggle and many were killed." The "Sura Virodhi Vyaparaya" against alcoholism launched by Srimath Anagarika Dharmapala in 1895, was seen by the British rulers as a direct attack on their regime which rented out taverns to get revenue for government coffers. At that time, there were 2,038 taverns. After the Temperance Movement agitation, there was a drastic drop to 190.
