= Don Spater Senanayake =

Ceylonese entrepreneur and philanthropist

Mudaliyar Don Spater Senanayake
- Born: August 21, 1845; Botale
- Died: December 7, 1912 (aged 67)
- Occupations: Entrepreneur and Philanthropist
- Children: D.C. Senanayake (Son); F. R. Senanayake (Son); D.S. Senanayake (Son); M J Senanayake (Daughter)

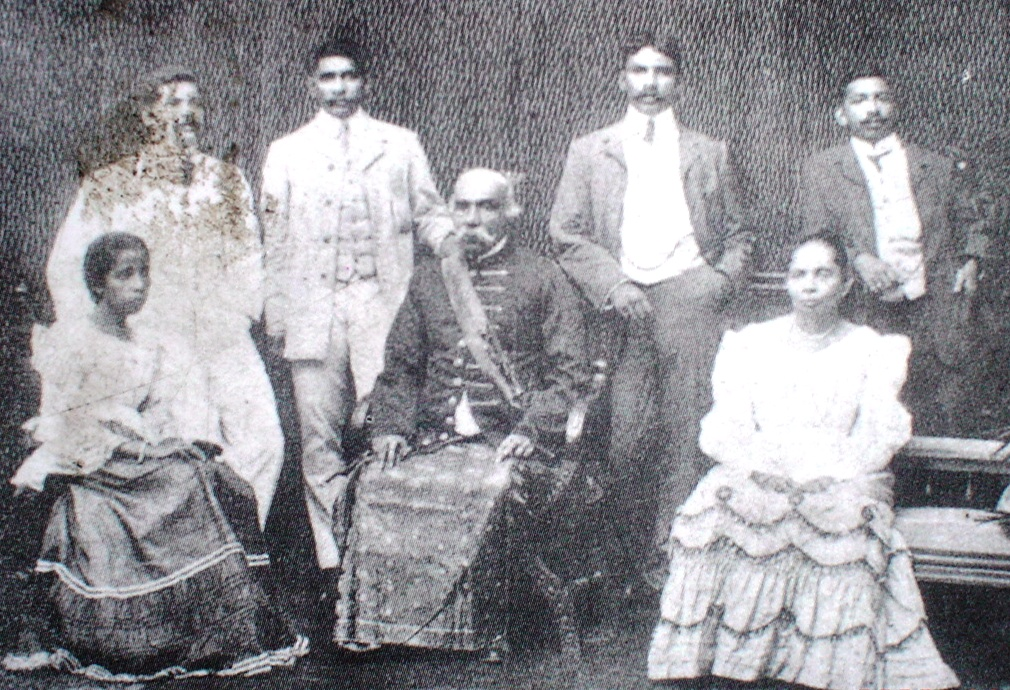
D.S. Senanayake, with brother-in-law F.H. Dias-Bandaranaike, brothers Don Charles and Don Stephen, sister Maria Frances, father Mudaliyar Don Spater, and mother Dona Catherina Elizabeth Perera. (circa. 1902)

Mudaliyar Don Spater Senanayake was a Ceylonese, an entrepreneur and philanthropist. He was a successful graphite mine owner and was given the titular title of Mudaliyar for social service by the British colonial administration. He is the father of D. S. Senanayake, the first Prime Minister of Sri Lanka.

Born in the village of Botale in 1847 to Don Bartholomew, he had his schooling at St Thomas’ College, Matale. He went into business and gained success in graphite mining, owning several mines. He also owned several plantations and investments in the arrack renting franchise. He married Dona Catherina Elizabeth Perera Gunasekera Senanayake, daughter of Baron Senanayake of Kehelella, Badalagama. They had three sons; Don Charles "D.C." Senanayake, Fredric Richard "F. R." Senanayake, Don Stephen "D.S." Senanayake and a daughter Maria Francess "Mary Jane" Senanayake.

He was awarded the title of Mudaliyar by Governor Sir Joseph West Ridgeway for being "a worthy citizen". He died on November 7, 1907. His politically active sons started a political lineage that extended several generations, lasting to this day. His son D. S. Senanayake became the first Prime Minister of Ceylon having led it to its independence, his grandson Dudley Shelton Senanayake succeeded his father as the second Prime Minister and held the post on three occasions. His eldest son Fredrick Richard Senanayake was elected to the Legislative Council and his son Richard Gotabhaya Senanayake went on to become a Cabinet minister. His descendants include Rukman Senanayake (great grandson), Vasantha Senanayake and Ruwan Wijewardene (great great grandsons) who are active in current Sri Lankan politics.

== See also ==
- List of political families in Sri Lanka
