= John Kotelawala Sr =

Ceylonese police officer and businessmen

John Kotelawala
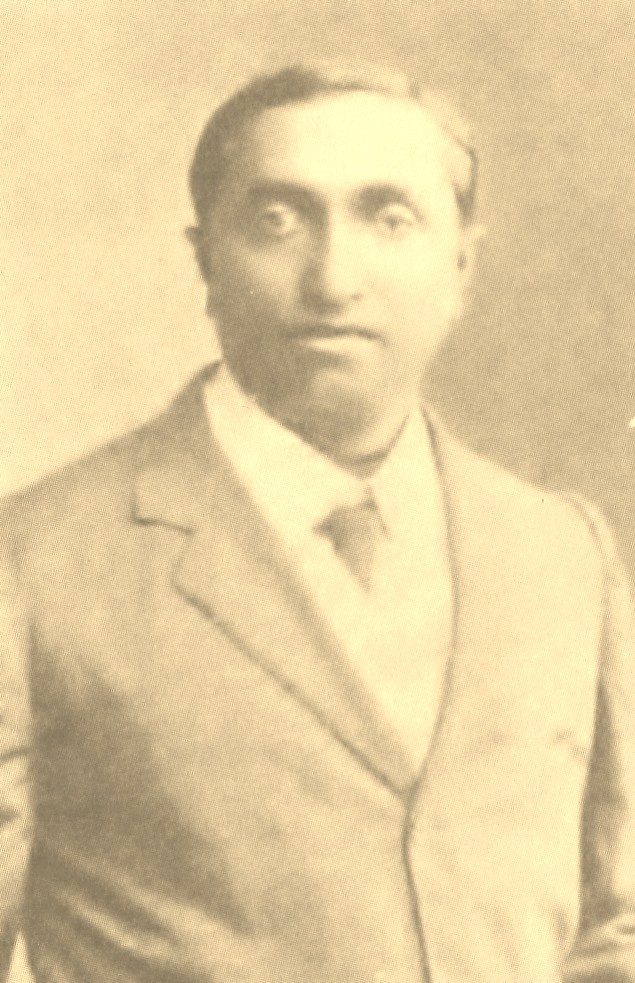
- John Kotelawala Sr
- Born: 4 November 1864; Piliyandala, British Ceylon
- Died: 20 April 1907 (aged 42); Colombo, British Ceylon
- Occupations: Police Inspector; Businessman
- Spouse: Alice Attygalle
- Children: Sir John Kotelawala; Justin Kotelawala; Freda Kotalawela

John Kotelawala (also known as John Kotelawala Sr; 4 November 1864 – 20 April 1907) was a Ceylonese police officer and businessmen. He was known for the murder of Francis Dixon Attygalle, one of the first sensational murder trials in Ceylon. His son General Sir John Kotelawala was the 3rd Prime Minister of Ceylon.

== Early life and education ==
Born in Piliyandala to Don A. Kotelawala, he was educated at Royal College, S. Thomas' College and Wesley College.

== Police career ==
Kotelawala joined the Ceylon Constabulary as a constable clerk. He was later promoted to Inspector and developed a reputation for raiding illegal gambling dens and cutting down on police corruption.

== Marriage and businesses ==
Kotelawala married Alice Elisabeth Attygalle, daughter of Mudaliyar Don Charles Gemoris Attygalle, a wealthy land and mine owner. They had three children, John, Justin and Freda. Freda married C.V.S. Corea, her son was Dr Gamani Corea.

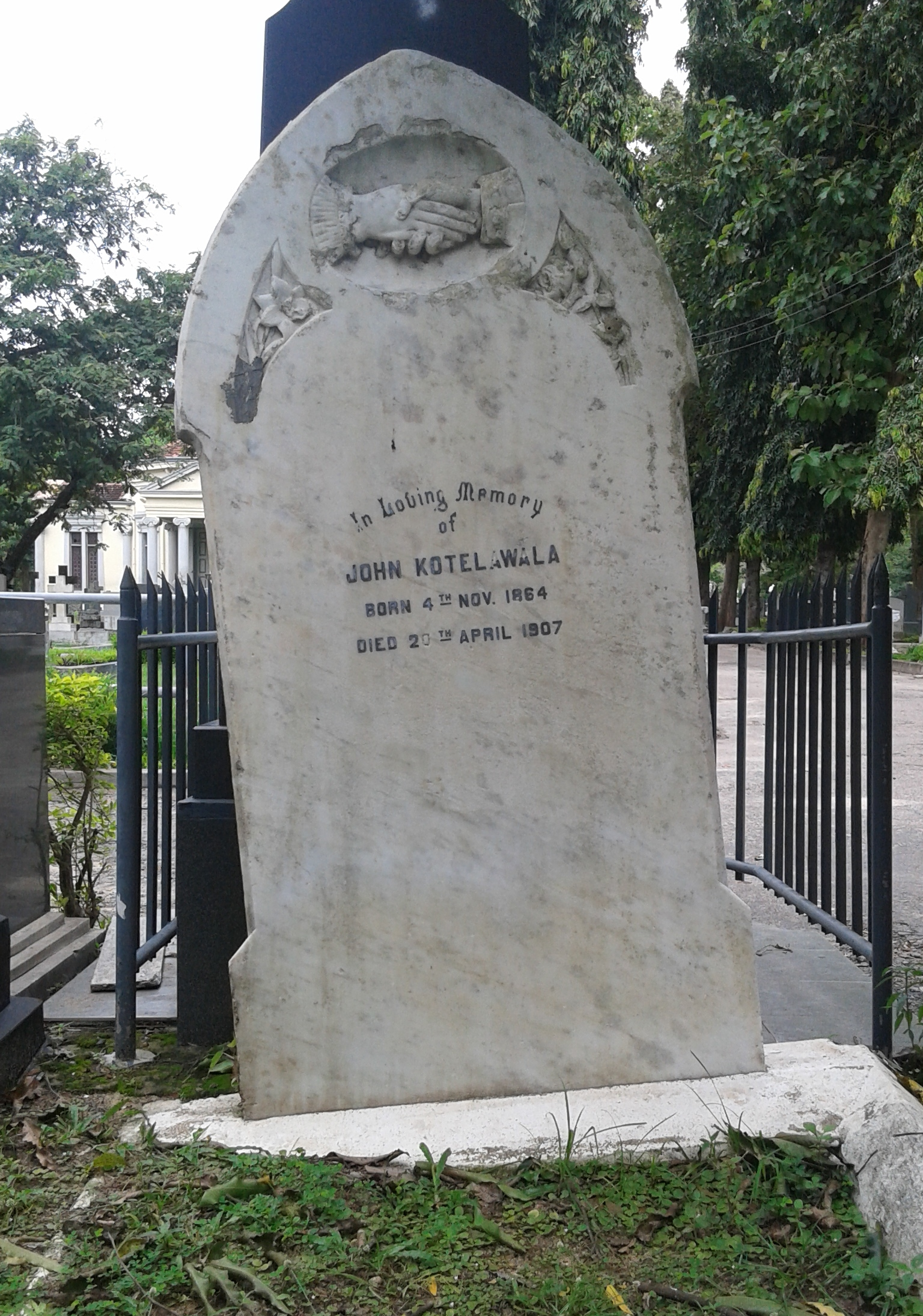
John Kotelawala Snr Tomb at Borella Cemetery.

After the death of his father-in-law, Mudaliyar Attygalle, Kotelawala left the police and took over the management of Mudaliyar Attygalle's estate. He was forced out of managing the family business after allegations of misappropriation and court cases filled by his mother-in-law in the Kurunegala District Court. Thereafter, Kotelwala started his own business ventures, first by managing the stake in the Attygalle family business which he had gained as dowry in his marriage, which included 2,058 acres (833 ha) of rubber and coconut estates, as well as a share of one-fourth of the graphite mines owned by the Attygalle family.

Kotelawala decided to expand into the transportation industry, which was at the time heavily dependent on bullock carts for rural trade. He was later elected President of the Carters Association of Colombo and became a popular figure. Kotelawala expanded into trading and formed the Ceylon-Japan Trading Company. In late 1906, Kotelwala set sail for Japan.

== Attygalle murder ==
On his return from Japan, Kotelawala was arrested for orchestrating the murder of Francis Dixon Attygalle, his brother-in-law. Francis Attygalle was shot dead by Piloris, a man who claimed to be a Boer War veteran and had served under Winston Churchill. Piloris was made Crown Witness by the attorney general, and Kotelawala and his former police sergeants, Singhoni Perera and Baron Perera, were accused of murder by the Colombo Assizes court. All of them were found guilty.

Kotelawala committed suicide on 1907 January 20 before his execution. After his suicide, several carters of the Carters Association of Colombo stormed the houses of the prosecutors, Acting Attorney General Walter Pereira, KC and Crown Counsel C. M. Fernando.

== See also ==
- List of political families in Sri Lanka

== External links and References ==
- The Kotelawala Ancestry
