= John Kotelawala =

3rd Prime Minister of Sri Lanka

General The Right Honourable Sir John Lionel Kotelawala CH KBE KStJ
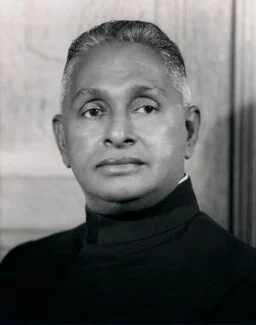
- Col. Sir John Kotelawala, c. 1951

3rd Prime Minister of Ceylon
- In office 12 October 1953 – 12 April 1956
- Monarch: Elizabeth II
- Governor-General: The 1st Viscount Soulbury; Sir Oliver Ernest Goonetilleke
- Preceded by: Dudley Senanayake
- Succeeded by: S. W. R. D. Bandaranaike

Minister of Defence and External Affairs
- In office 12 October 1953 – 12 April 1956
- Prime Minister: Himself
- Preceded by: Dudley Senanayake
- Succeeded by: S. W. R. D. Bandaranaike

4th Leader of the House
- In office 12 July 1951 – 12 October 1953
- Prime Minister: D. S. Senanayake; Dudley Senanayake
- Preceded by: S. W. R. D. Bandaranaike
- Succeeded by: J. R. Jayewardene

Minister of Transport and Works
- In office 26 September 1947 – 1954
- Prime Minister: D. S. Senanayake; Dudley Senanayake; Himself
- Succeeded by: Montague Jayawickrama

Member of the Ceylon Parliament for Dodangaslanda
- In office 14 October 1947 – 5 December 1959
- Succeeded by: A.U. Romanis

Personal details
- Born: 4 April 1897 Piliyandala, British Ceylon
- Died: 2 October 1980 (aged 83) Colombo, Sri Lanka
- Party: United National Party
- Spouse: Euphemia Manthri Dias Bandaranaike
- Children: Lakshmini Kotelawala
- Education: Christ's College, Cambridge, Royal College, Colombo
- Profession: Politician, Soldier, Planter

Military service
- Allegiance: Ceylon
- Branch/service: Ceylon Defence Force; Sri Lanka Army
- Rank: General (Sri Lanka Army), Colonel (Ceylon Defence Force)
- Unit: Ceylon Light Infantry
- Commands: 1st Battalion, Ceylon Light Infantry

General Sir John Lionel Kotelawala CH KBE KStJ PC (Sinhala: ශ්‍රිමත් ජෝන් ලයනල් කොතලාවල; 4 April 1897 – 2 October 1980) was a Sri Lankan statesman, who served as the third Prime Minister of Ceylon (Sri Lanka) from 1953 to 1956. A longtime member of the United National Party (UNP), he held various cabinet positions under previous governments.

Born to a wealthy landholding and mining family, Kotelawala had a difficult childhood with the suicide of his father and the financial difficulties that followed. He was educated at Royal College, Colombo, and Christ's College, Cambridge, before returning to become a planter and run the family estates and mines. Kotelawala joined the Ceylon Defense Force as a volunteer officer in 1922. Being from a politically active family, he entered mainstream politics in 1931 having been elected to the State Council of Ceylon. He went on to serve as Minister of Communications and Works in the Second Board of Ministers of Ceylon. Having served as the commanding officer of the Ceylon Light Infantry, he transferred to the reserve with the rank of colonel in 1942.

With Ceylon gaining independence in 1948, he was elected to Parliament and became a member of the first Cabinet as Minister of Transport and Works. He was overlooked for the post of prime minister when his uncle, the first prime minister of Ceylon, D. S. Senanayake, died suddenly. A year later he succeeded his cousin, Dudley Senanayake, as the third Prime Minister of Ceylon, serving until his party lost the general election in 1956.

Kotelawala played a prominent role in the development of Ceylon's foreign policy during the early years of the Cold War. He convened the Colombo Conference in 1954, which brought together the leaders of Ceylon, India, Pakistan, Burma and Indonesia and helped lay the groundwork for the Asian-African Conference at Bandung the following year. At Bandung, Kotelawala advocated a conception of anti-colonialism that included opposition to what he regarded as Soviet expansionism and international communism, placing him at times in disagreement with Jawaharlal Nehru and other leaders of the emerging non-aligned movement. His outspoken approach attracted international attention and established him as one of the most distinctive voices in early Afro-Asian diplomacy.

Domestically, Kotelawala's administration presided over a period of economic recovery following the political and economic disruption of the 1953 Hartal. The improvement was accompanied by stronger export performance and a substantial trade surplus, the largest ever recorded in the country's history at the time, supported in part by favourable international prices for Ceylon's principal exports.

Housing became a particular focus of the administration, with the establishment of a national housing framework and the promotion of what Housing Minister Kanthiah Vaithianathan described as a “house-owning democracy”. His government also pursued a strongly anti-communist policy, opposing the influence of communist organisations and movements in Ceylon and taking measures to restrict their activities.

Kotelawala retired from politics in 1956, going to self-imposed exile in Kent. Having donated his home, Kandawala, to the state to form a defense university, he was awarded the rank of general on his deathbed.

== Early life and education ==
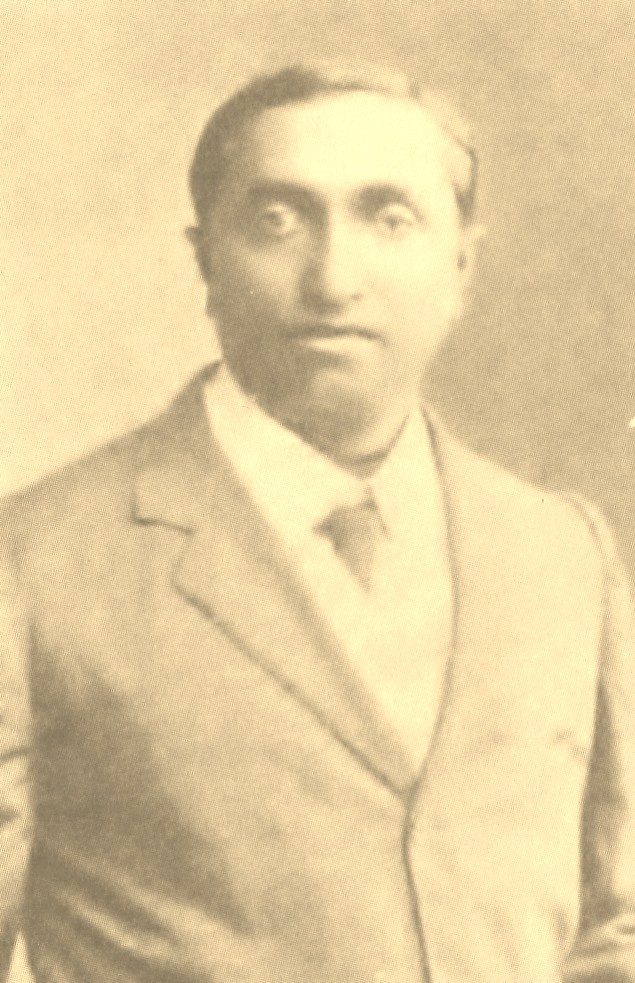
Kotelawela's father, John Kotelawala Snr

Kotelawala was born on 4 April 1897 to John Kotelawala Snr, a police inspector, who later turned businessman and Alice Elisabeth Kotelawala (née Attygalle), daughter of Mudaliyar Don Charles Gemoris Attygalle, a wealthy land and mine owner. He had a younger brother Justin Kotelawala and a sister Freda, who later married C. V. S. Corea.

The Kotelawalas lived in considerable comfort owing to the considerable land and mine holdings of his grandfather Mudaliyar Attygalle, which his father managed following the death of his grandfather. After he was forced out of the management of the Attygalle estates by the family, Kotelawala Snr started his own business ventures including the Ceylon-Japan Trading Company. In 1907, he was arrested and found guilty of conspiring to murder his brother-in-law, Francis Attygalle. While the murder trial was underway, Kotelawala Snr committed suicide by poisoning himself.

Kotelawala was eleven years old when his father died and with this, the family fortunes declined after much funds were spent in the legal defence of his father. Alice Kotelawala who had converted to Christianity slowly built up the family wealth through careful management of their remaining land holdings and the share of the Kahatagaha graphite mine, which she received from her younger sister Ellen and brother-in-law, Fredrick Richard Senanayake. She was reputed for her social work and was later awarded an MBE in the 1939 Birthday Honours and a CBE in the 1951 Birthday Honours.

Young Kotelawala attended Royal College, Colombo, representing the school in cricket, tennis, boxing and football. He played in the Royal–Thomian. He had to leave owing to involvements in the riots in 1915, embarking on a tour of Europe, with World War I raging. He remained in Europe for five years, spending most of that time in England and France, and attended Christ's College, Cambridge to study agriculture. Kotelawala was known as an aggressive and outspoken man who loved sports, horseback riding and cricket and, particularly as a young man, got into physical fights when he was insulted. He was fluent in Sinhala, English and French. After returning to Ceylon, he became a planter, running his family plantation estates and mines, which included the Kahatagaha Graphite Mine in Dodangaslanda. He served as a Justice of the Peace.

== Military service ==
In a time when serving in the volunteer forces was prestigious and a gentlemanly pursuit, Kotelawala gained a commission as a second lieutenant in the Ceylon Light Infantry on 15 September 1922. That year the regiment received colours from the Prince of Wales. He progressed with promotions to lieutenant on 27 October 1924, captain on 23 August 1929 and major on 1 October 1933. On 1 July 1939, he was appointed second in command of the Ceylon Light Infantry and served till 1 September 1940. He was promoted to the rank of lieutenant colonel on 1 October 1940 and was posted to the reserve of the regiment.

With the outbreak of World War II in the Far East, the Ceylon Defence Force including the Ceylon Light Infantry was mobilized and expanded for wartime service with the British Army. Kotelawala as the Minister of Communications and Works, became a member of the Ceylon's War Council and served as the Commander-in-Chief of the Essential Services Labor Corp. He provided his home, Kandawala to function as the officers mess for the wartime RAF station at Rathmalana. He was promoted to honorary rank of colonel on 2 July 1942, the highest rank that a Ceylonese could achieve at the time in the Ceylon Defence Force.

== Early political career ==
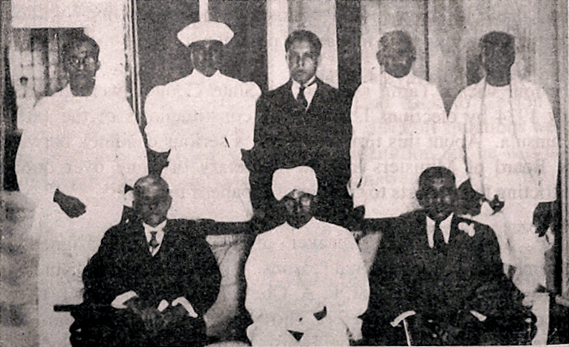
Kotelawala as a member of the Board of Ministers of the Second State Council of Ceylon in 1936.

As early as 1915 Kotelawala had become involved with political leaders such as Don Stephen Senanayake and his brother F.R. Senanayake, who was married to Kotelawala's mother's sister. They criticized many of the actions of the British colonial officials following the riots in 1915.

== State Council ==
Captain John Kotelawala contested the Kurunegala seat in the 1931 election for the State Council of Ceylon. He gained 17159 votes, a majority of 9045 over his opponent from the Ceylon National Congress. Elected to the State Council, he served as a backbencher in its first term. He was re-elected unopposed in the 1936 state council election from Kurunegala and was elected as Minister of Communications and Works, the chair Communications and Works Committee in the Second Board of Ministers of Ceylon. As the Minister, he oversaw the initiation of several major public works projects in the island.

== In Cabinet ==
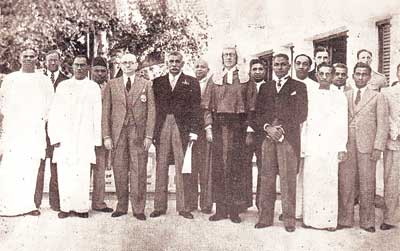
The first Cabinet of Ministers of Ceylon

Just before Ceylon received independence and dominion status in 1948, Colonel Kotelawala had contested the 1947 general elections for the United National Party (UNP), founded by D. S. Senanayake, from the Dodangaslanda electorate and was elected to the newly formed House of Representatives, which was the elected lower house of parliament established under the Soulbury Constitution. Kotelawala was an important member of the UNP and was appointed by Senanayake as Minister of Transport and Works, retaining the portfolio of public works which he had held on the second board of ministers.

During his tenure major projects such as the Laxapana power project, expansion of the Colombo harbour, expansion of the Ratmalana Airport, construction of the University of Peradeniya and the expansion of road in the island took place. With S. W. R. D. Bandaranaike leaving the UNP and crossing over to the opposition, Kotelawala was appointed Leader of the House in the House of Representatives on 12 July 1951.

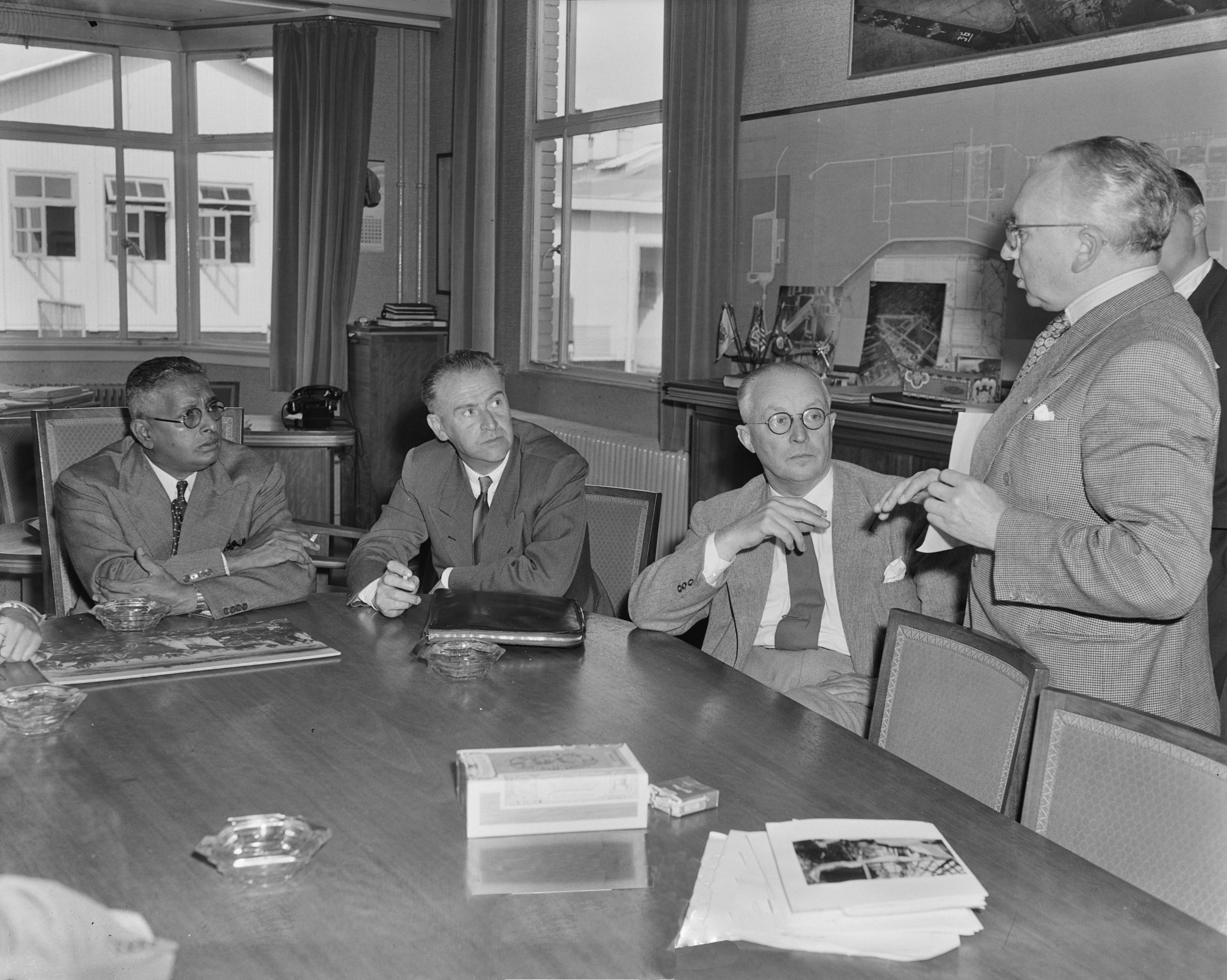
Sir John Kotelawala as Minister of Transport visiting at Amsterdam Airport Schiphol in 1951.

When Senanayake suddenly died on 22 March 1952, Kotelawala expected to succeed him as prime minister, given he was the leader of the house and the most senior member of the UNP. However, to his great anger, Lord Soulbury, the Governor-General, appointed Senanayake's son and Kotelawala's younger cousin, Dudley Senanayake, as prime minister on 26 March 1952. An angry Kotelawala threatened resignation and a possible split in the party appeared. After mediation between Kotelawala and Senanayake by senior UNP members including Sir Oliver Goonetilleke, Kotelawala agreed to serve in Dudley Senanayake's cabinet, retaining his existing portfolio. Soon after Senanayake called for fresh elections and in the 1952 general elections, Kotelawala was re-elected and retained his ministry and the post of leader of the house as the UNP won a majority to form a government.

The following year, the Senanayake government faced major civil unrest with left-wing parties launching the 1953 Hartal in August. On 12 August 1953 civil disobedience, strikes and demonstrations started throughout the island by trade unions against the proposed elimination of the subsidy on rice by the government. The country came to a stand still with transport and communication stopping due to acts of sabotage. The government implemented emergency regulations and deployed the army to suppress the Hartal and restore order. Badly shaken by the events of the Hartal, Senanayake, who was gravely ill, resigned as prime minister on 12 October 1953. Kotelawala succeeded Senanayake as prime minister, Minister of Defense, Minister of External Affairs, and as leader of the UNP.

== Prime minister ==
=== Domestic policy ===
Anti-communism

Kotelawala was a committed opponent of communism and made combating its influence in Ceylon a prominent part of his domestic policy. In his first broadcast as prime minister, he stated that one of his foremost duties would be to combat communism in the country. His government subsequently took measures against communist political activity, including restricting the entry of foreign communists and seeking greater control over communist influence at the University of Ceylon.

His anti-communism was also prominent in his political rhetoric. In a speech to the House of Representatives on 21 June 1955, Kotelawala described the Soviet Union as Ceylon's “enemy No. 1” and warned that Communist Party leaders could become instruments of Soviet influence. His government and the United National Party frequently portrayed the local communist movement as a threat to Ceylon's democratic political system.

He took a hardline stand against trade unions and left-wing parties. He formed the Ceylon Railway Engineer Corps and Post and Telegraph Signals to minimise the effects on transport and communication in the event of trade union action.

Economic Policy

Kotelawala's premiership was marked by a recovery in the economy following the disruption caused by the 1953 Hartal. Economic growth, which had contracted by 0.9 percent in 1953, rose to 5.3 percent in 1954 and 5.0 percent in 1955. The improvement was accompanied by increased export earnings and stronger agricultural production, with gross national product reaching an estimated Rs. 5.1 billion in 1955, a 6.8 percent increase over the previous year. In 1955, Ceylon recorded a trade surplus of Rs. 532 million, the largest ever recorded at the time, while the current account recorded a surplus of Rs. 323 million.

Housing and Development

Kotelawala's government gave housing a prominent place in its domestic programme. In 1953, the government gave housing Cabinet-level recognition and appointed Senator Kanthiah Vaithianathan as Minister of Housing. This was followed by the establishment of the Department of National Housing in 1953, the National Housing Fund in 1954 and the enactment of the National Housing Act in 1954. The government's housing policy was intended to expand access to home ownership among the middle and working classes. Vaithianathan described its objective as creating a “house-owning democracy”.

The programme combined direct government provision with assistance for individuals and building societies to construct their own homes. The government planned to construct houses and blocks of flats that could be acquired through rent-purchase arrangements, while also providing land, financial assistance and loans at graded rates of interest to people seeking to build their own houses.

The most prominent project associated with the programme was the Watapuluwa Housing Scheme in Kandy, launched in 1955. Kandy had a large population of public servants but faced a shortage of government quarters and private housing, leaving many officials in inadequate accommodation. A Kandy Public Servants' Building Society, established in 1954, successfully petitioned the government to acquire land at Watapuluwa for a housing scheme. The government subsequently authorised a special salary-loan arrangement through which public servants could obtain financing to acquire land and construct their own houses.

Watapuluwa was significant for the way in which the government, housing authorities and prospective residents participated in the development process. Architect Minnette de Silva, who was the chief architect of the project, consulted beneficiaries about their household requirements, preferences and financial circumstances and developed a range of house types suited to the site's topography and the varying means of residents. The scheme also incorporated community facilities and required beneficiaries to contribute towards communal services. Construction was disrupted following the change of government in 1956 but the project was subsequently completed in 1958.

Royal Visit to Ceylon

He hosted Queen Elizabeth II and the Duke of Edinburgh in Ceylon during their Royal Commonwealth Tour in April 1954, using the occasion to request the appointment of a Ceylonese Governor-General when Lord Soulbury's tenure ended. This came to be when Sir Oliver Goonetilleke was appointed Governor-General in July 1954. Kotelawala himself was appointed to the Imperial Privy Council during the visit.

=== Foreign policy ===
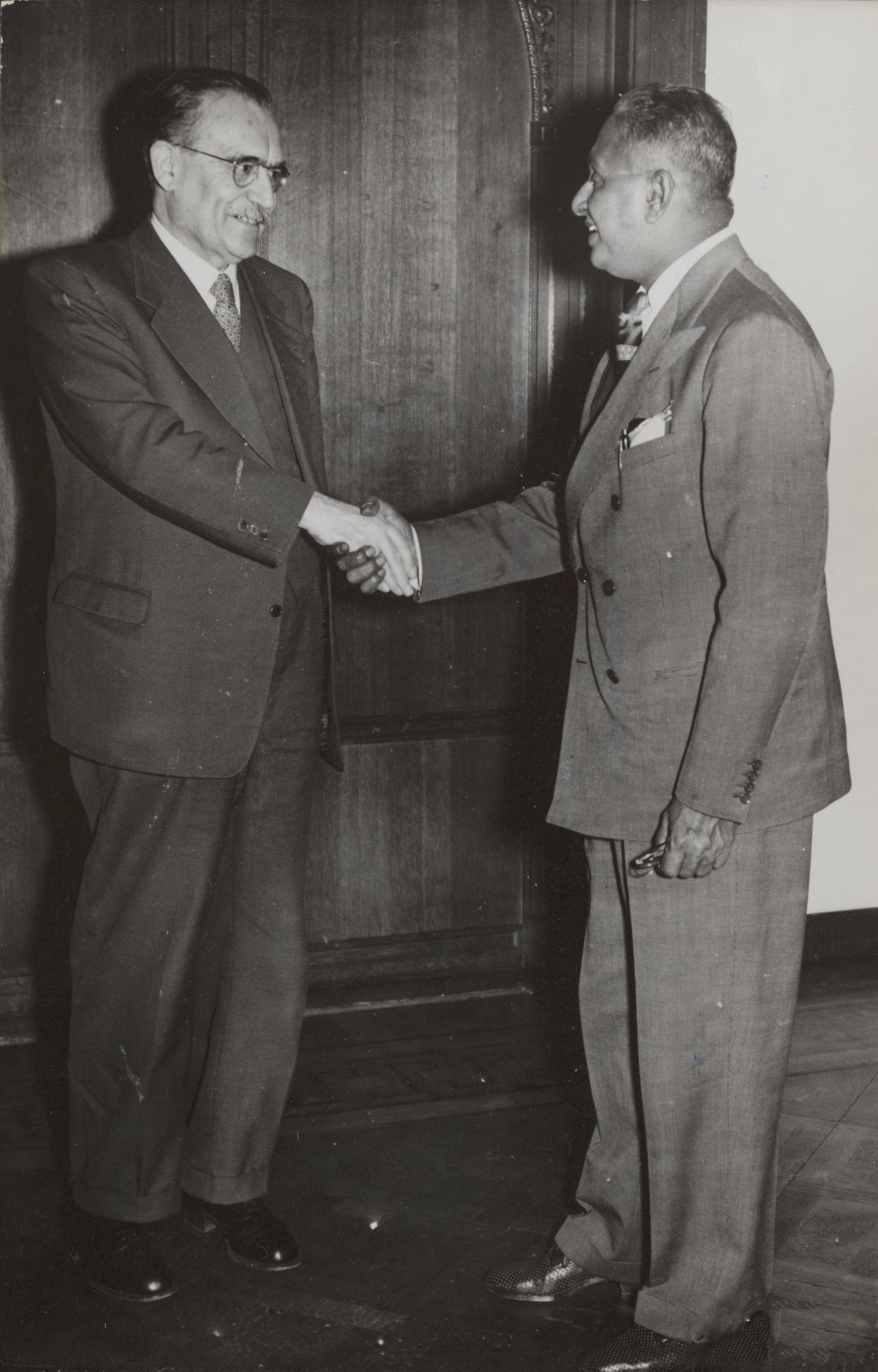
Sir John Kotelawala meeting Dutch Prime Minister Willem Drees at The Hague in 1955.

As prime minister, Kotelawala led Sri Lanka into the United Nations and contributed to Sri Lanka's expanding foreign relations, particularly with other Asian countries.

Kotelawala played an important role in the development of post-colonial Asian diplomacy. In April 1954, he convened the Colombo Conference, bringing together the prime ministers of Ceylon, India, Pakistan, Burma and Indonesia to discuss regional and international affairs, including the conflict in Indochina. The meeting subsequently led to the proposal for a wider Asian-African conference, which was held in Bandung, Indonesia, in 1955.

Kotelawala's foreign policy combined support for Asian regional cooperation with a strong opposition to communism. At Bandung, he argued that communist expansion and Soviet domination of Eastern Europe should be regarded as forms of imperialism alongside Western colonialism. His position brought him into disagreement with Indian Prime Minister Jawaharlal Nehru and Chinese Premier Zhou Enlai, who favoured a stronger emphasis on Western colonialism. Kotelawala's strongly anti-communist speeches at Bandung received favourable coverage in the Western media. His speeches attracted considerable attention in newspapers in Britain, Canada, Italy and the United States, with several portraying him as a prominent advocate of opposition to communism at the conference. Kotelawala's outspoken opposition to communist colonialism and his willingness to challenge the prevailing views at Bandung raised his profile as a prominent figure in Asian diplomacy. His position presented an alternative to Nehru's approach to the emerging Afro-Asian movement. The Washington Post, in an article published on 23 April 1955, described Kotelawala as an emerging challenge to Nehru's position in Asian leadership.

Kotelawala nevertheless maintained that Ceylon should not align itself with either Cold War bloc and resisted pressure for the country to join the Southeast Asia Treaty Organization (SEATO). His approach has consequently been described as a pragmatic attempt to maintain a middle course while preserving Ceylon's Western security and economic ties and developing relations with its Asian neighbours.

The famous exchange between Kotelawala and Nehru occurred in the context of these disagreements. After Kotelawala delivered his controversial Bandung speech, Nehru questioned why he had not shown him the speech beforehand. Kotelawala replied, “Why should I? Do you show me yours before you make them?” Kotelawala later wrote that he regarded Nehru as a close friend and did not consider the exchange to have damaged their relationship.

At the Bandung Conference, Kotelawala also raised the issue of reforming the United Nations system. He advocated the abolition of the veto power held by the major powers in the Security Council and proposed that the Council should instead be a fully elected body responsible to the General Assembly.

Kotelawala's government also maintained close military ties with Western powers during the early Cold War. In April 1954, he permitted seven United States Globemaster aircraft carrying French paratroopers bound for the war in Indochina to land at Katunayake Airport, where they were refuelled and serviced.

In November 1954, Kotelawala embarked on a goodwill tour of several countries, including Italy, France, the United Kingdom, Canada, the United States, Japan, the Philippines, Malaya and Indonesia. During his visit to the United States, he met President Dwight D. Eisenhower at the White House and held discussions with Secretary of State John Foster Dulles and other senior officials. He subsequently described the visit as an important diplomatic engagement and used his public appearances in the United States to advocate greater Western economic assistance to developing countries as a means of countering the spread of communism.

Emphasising the importance of strengthening Ceylon's diplomatic representation abroad, following his tour, he told the House of Representatives that Ceylon was inadequately represented overseas and argued that a stronger diplomatic presence would advance the country's interests in trade and other areas.

=== Electoral defeat ===
His government had to deal with economic problems and ethnic tensions. Although his parliamentary term was valid till 1957, he had the Governor General dissolve Parliament in 1956, calling for fresh elections. However, the UNP faced a major defeat in the 1956 general elections by a group of more radically chauvinistic Sinhalese parties under the leadership of Solomon Bandaranaike which formed a coalition called the Mahajana Eksath Peramuna, which had non-compete agreements with other leftist parties. Of the 76 candidates fielded by the UNP only eight were elected to parliament, resulting in a humiliating defeat which made the UNP a minority in the opposition.

== Final years in Parliament ==
Kotelawala retained his parliamentary seat having been reelected from the Dodangaslanda electorate, however, he did not attend parliament often since Dr N. M. Perera had become the Leader of the Opposition. He returned the party leadership to Dudley Senanayake and left the island. He did not contest the 1960 general elections, instead, he supported the candidacy of A. U. Romanis, his personal chauffeur, as the UNP candidate for Dodangaslanda. Romanis won both general elections in 1960 and remained a member of parliament till 1964.

== Later life ==
Kotelawala retired from politics shortly after his electoral defeat. He bought the Brogues Wood estate at Biddenden in Kent, where he lived for several years. He eventually returned to Ceylon. When the post of Governor-General appeared vacant with the completion of William Gopallawa's first term, he was hopeful that he would be nominated to the post by the United National Party which was in the government at the time. However Dudley Senanayake in his second term as prime minister did not name a successor for Gopallawa and allowed him to have a second term.

=== Defence university ===
Kotelawala was a strong supporter of the military and maintained close links with the army. He was the first Chairman of the Ceylon Light Infantry Association in 1974 and was the President of the Ceylon Ex Servicemen's Association from 1948 to his death. In 1978, the commanders of the armed forces identified a need to establish a Defence university to cater to the academic training of its officers. Although the government approved it, funds were limited and no location was provided by the government. In 1979, Lieutenant General Denis Perera, Commander of the Sri Lankan Army approached Kotelawala with the proposal of donating his home Kandawala and its 50 acres estate to the state to establish a Defence university. Six months later having reviewed the proposal and consulted his heirs, Kotelawala agreed to donate Kandawala following his death. On 11 July 1980, he signed a deed of gift with the President, transferring Kandawala at President's House, Colombo and a formal ceremony to establish the institution was scheduled for 11 October 1980.

== Death ==
On 29 September 1980, he suffered a stroke at Kandawala and was taken to the cardiac unit of the Colombo General Hospital. On 1 October, President J. R. Jayewardene visited Kotelawala and conferred on him the honorary rank of a General of the Volunteer Force of the Army in recognition of his long service to the country, which was acknowledged by Kotelawala who was on his deathbed. The honor was planned to be awarded on 11 October at the ceremony establishing the proposed Defense Academy.

He died on 2 October 1980 at the Colombo General Hospital. On 5 October, Kotelawala's coffin which was kept at Kandawala was moved to Parliament House to lay in state, before final rites at Independence Square with full military honours.

== Personal life ==
He married Effie Manthri Dias Bandaranaike, daughter of F. H. Dias Bandaranaike and Maria Frances Dias Bandaranaike nee Senanayake, daughter of Mudaliyar Don Spater Senanayake and sister of Don Stephen Senanayake. Although the marriage was not successful, ending in separation, the marriage produced a daughter, Lakshmini Kotelawala, who married Henry Gerald Kotalawala from Badulla. Lakshman Kotalawala was the only grand child of Kotelawala.

Kotelawala was known for his flamboyance and the company he kept. He would entertain guests at his home in Kandawala and his cottage in Nuwara Eliya. Even as prime minister he resided at Kandawala.

== Legacy ==
In 1985 a national defence academy for the training of officers for all three Sri Lankan defence services was established at his estate Kandawala, which he had left to the country in his will for this purpose. It has been named General Sir John Kotelawala Defence University (KDU) is a defence university offering undergraduate and postgraduate study courses to officers of the defence services in Sri Lanka in various disciplines. Statues of Sir John Kotelawala have been erected in many parts of the island, including one at the Old Parliament Building, Colombo. Many schools, libraries and public buildings have been named in his honour. In 1993, the Sir John Kotelawala Museum was opened in Kandawala by the President.

== Honours ==
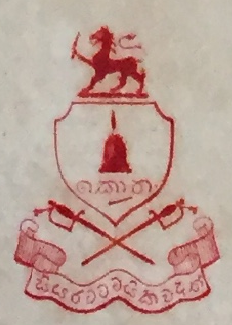
Sir John Kotelawala's Coat of Arms

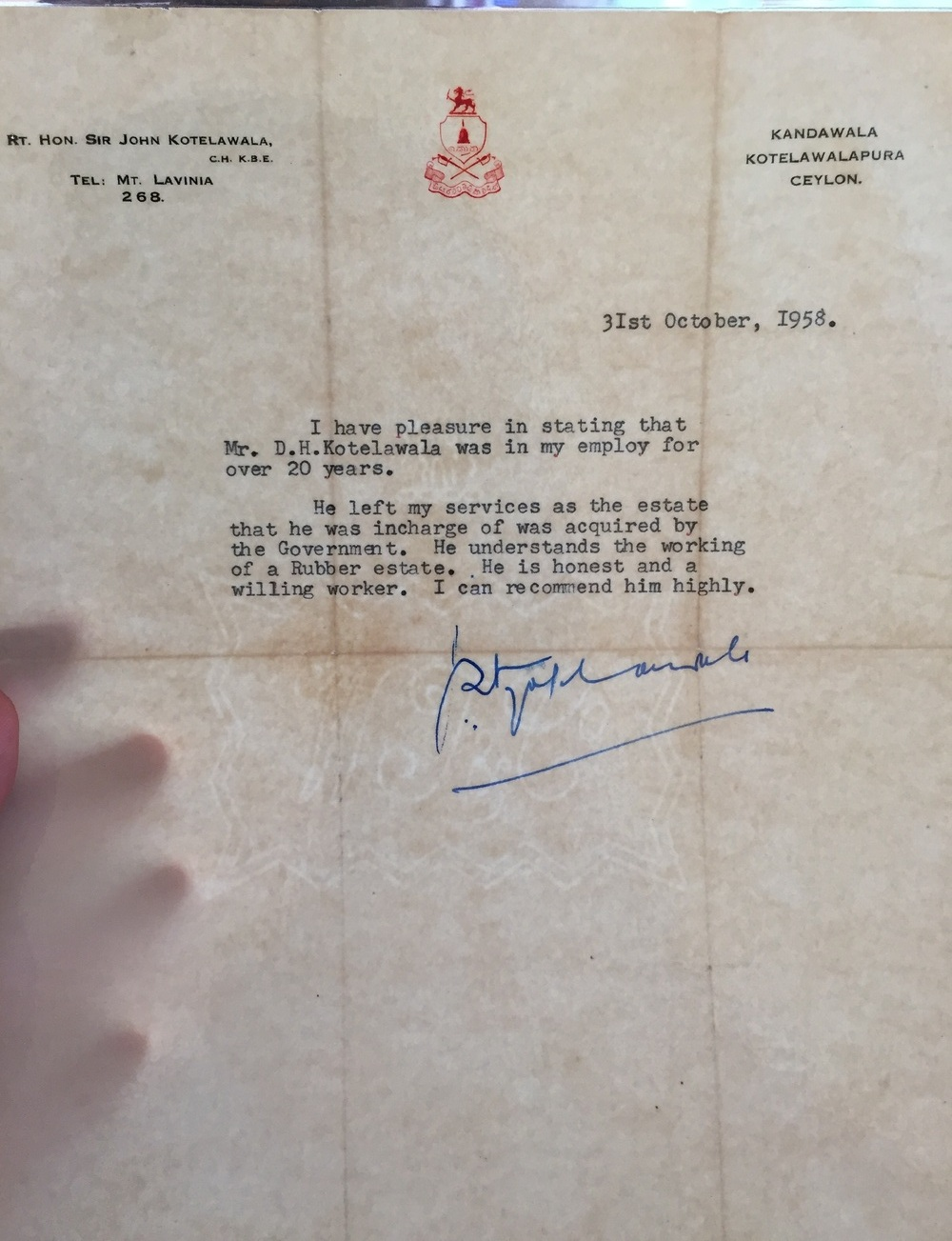
An Official Letter to Harry Kotelawala

His Orders, Decorations, Medals and other memorabilia are on display at the General Sir John Kotelawala Defence University.

Appointments

- (United Kingdom) Member of the Privy Council (1954)

Honorary military appointments

- (Sri Lanka) General of the Volunteer Force of the Army (1980)
- (British Ceylon) Colonel of the Ceylon Defense Force (1942)

Decorations and Medals

| Ribbon | Name | Date awarded |
|---|---|---|
| | Knight Commander of the Order of the British Empire (KBE) | 1948 |
| | Member of the Order of the Companions of Honour (CH) | 1956 |
| | Knight of Justice of the Most Venerable Order of the Hospital of Saint John of Jerusalem (KStJ) | 1965 |
| | Defence Medal | 1945 |
| | War Medal 1939–1945 | 1945 |
| | King George V Silver Jubilee Medal | 1935 |
| | King George VI Coronation Medal | 1937 |
| | Queen Elizabeth II Coronation Medal | 1952 |
| | Efficiency Medal (Ceylon) with clasp | 1949 |
| | Ceylon Armed Services Inauguration Medal | 1955 |
| | Knight Grand Cross of the Légion d´honneur (Note: There are no record in the official French Database Léonore.) | 1954 |
| | Order of the Rising Sun, 1st Class | 1954 |
| | Knight Grand Cross of the Order of Merit of the Italian Republic | 1954 |
| | Knight Grand Cross 1st Class of the Order of Merit of the Federal Republic of Germany | 1955 |
| | Knight Grand Cross of the Order of the White Elephant | 1956 |
| | Knight Grand Cross of the Order of the Netherlands Lion | 1956 |
| | Ceylon Armed Services Long Service Medal | 1980 |
| | Republic of Sri Lanka Armed Services Medal | 1980 |
| | Sri Lanka Army 25th Anniversary Medal | 1980 |

Educational

- (Dominion of Ceylon) LLD (honorary) – University of Ceylon
- (Sri Lanka) LLD (posthumously) – General Sir John Kotelawala Defence University

== Electoral history ==
Electoral history of John Kotelawala
| Election | Constituency | Party | Votes | Result |
|---|---|---|---|---|
| 1931 state council | Kurunegala | Independent | 17,159 | Elected |
| 1936 state council | Kurunegala | Independent | Unopposed | Elected |
| 1947 parliamentary | Dodangaslanda | United National Party | 17,548 | Elected |
| 1952 parliamentary | Dodangaslanda | United National Party | 21,934 | Elected |
| 1952 parliamentary | Dodangaslanda | United National Party | 20,286 | Elected |

== See also ==
- Kotelawala cabinet
- List of political families in Sri Lanka
- General Sir John Kotelawala Defence University
- Ceylon Light Infantry
- Wanda Kotalawala
- Henry Kotalawala

== Notes ==
Government offices
| Preceded by Dudley Shelton Senanayake | Prime Minister of Ceylon; 1953–1956 | Succeeded by S. W. R. D. Bandaranaike |
