= Don Charles Gemoris Attygalle =

Ceylonese entrepreneur and mine owner

Mudaliyar Don Charles Gemoris Attygalle (8 September 1836 - 12 December 1901) was a Ceylonese entrepreneur and mine owner. He was a successful graphite mine owner and was given the title of Mudaliyar for social service by the British Governor of Ceylon. Through the marriage of his daughters, the Senanayake family and the Jayewardene family were connected and played a major part in the Sri Lankan independence movement and in post-independence politics, due in part to the wealth he had accumulated.

== Early life ==
Born in the Salpita Korale, Attygalle went to work in the Peradeniya Botanical Gardens at the age of 12 years. After learning agriculture, at the age of 18, he was sent to the Hakgala Botanical Garden, in charge of the cinchona plantation there. Cinchona was used to make quinine to treat malaria.

== Business ventures ==
Six years later he left to start his own plantation to supply plants to European planters and businessmen. He then went into a partnership to plant coffee in Kadugananwa. With profits from these enterprises, he invested in a graphite vein he found, and started graphite mines in the North Western province, the largest of which was in Kahatagaha. The Kahatagaha Graphite Mine became the first large-scale graphite mine in Ceylon, and remains one of the few operational mines in Sri Lanka to this day managed by the company Kahatagaha Graphite Lanka Limited. Prospering from the revenue from graphite mining, Attygalle expanded his business into agriculture by acquiring over 10,000 acres of coconut and rubber plantations.

== Philanthropy and honors ==
Attygalle contributed to many philanthropic endeavors including the construction of schools and temples in the North Western province and in the Salpita Korale. For his philanthropic services, he was appointed a Muhandiram in 1885 and then Mudaliyar in 1900 by the Governor Joseph West Ridgeway.

== Family ==
D.C.G. Attygalle married in 1872 Petronella Abeykoon, daughter of Fonseka Abeykoon. They had three daughters and one son. All his daughters married men of established repute, his grandchildren played a major part in the post-independence politics of Ceylon. His eldest daughter Alice Elizabeth, married John Kotelawala Sr, a police inspector, and their son Sir John Kotelawala became the third Prime Minister of Ceylon. His second daughter Lena, married Colonel T. G. Jayewardene, their son Major T. F. Jayewardene was a member of parliament and Colonel Jayewardene's nephew J. R. Jayewardene, became the President of Sri Lanka. Attygalle's youngest daughter, Ellen married F. R. Senanayake, a barrister and member of the Colombo Municipal Council, he initiated the Sri Lankan independence movement with his brother D. S. Senanayake, who became the first Prime Minister of Ceylon. Francis Dixon Attygalle was their only son

== The Attygalle murder ==
D.C.G. Attygalle took ill and died on 12 December 1901, his son-in-law John Kotelawala Sr left the police and took over managing the Attygalle family business, until he fell out with the family and was removed following legal proceedings undertaken by Attygalle's widow and son Francis Dixon Attygalle, who took over the business from Kotelawala. The young Francis Dixon Attygalle was murdered when he was shot by a gunman at his home, Collamune Walauwa and succumbed to his wounds at the hospital. Kotelawala was implicated and arrested on his return from Japan and was later convicted by the Colombo Assizes court. He committed suicide while awaiting execution.

== See also ==
- List of political families in Sri Lanka
