= Sri Lankan independence activist =

Sri Lankan independence activists are those who are considered to have played a major role in the Sri Lankan independence movement from British Colonial rule during the 20th century.

== List of prominent Sri Lankan independence activists ==
- A. E. Goonesinha
- N.M. Perera
- Leslie Goonewardene
- Vivienne Goonewardene
- Philip Gunawardena
- Colvin R. de Silva
- Don Stephen Senanayake
- Fredrick Richard Senanayake
- Don Charles Senanayake
- Anagarika Dharmapala
- Sir James Peiris
- Sir Ponnambalam Ramanathan
- Sir Ponnambalam Arunachalam
- Sir Susantha de Fonseka
- D. R. Wijewardena
- E. W. Perera
- George E. de Silva
- Charles Edgar Corea
- Victor Corea
- Gratien Fernando
- Henry Pedris
- Arthur V. Dias
- Wilmot A. Perera
- Tuan Burhanudeen Jayah
- M.C. Siddi Lebbe
- C. W. W. Kannangara
- W. A. de Silva
- S. Mahinda
- H. W. Amarasuriya
- Thomas Amarasuriya
- H. Sri Nissanka

== List of other Sri Lankan independence activists ==
- Mark Anthony Bracegirdle
- William de Silva
- Pieter Keuneman
- Doric de Souza
- Armand de Souza
- S. A. Wickramasinghe
- Sir Edwin Wijeyeratne

== See also ==
- Uva Rebellion
- Matale Rebellion
- Suriya-Mal Movement
- Sri Lankan independence movement
- National Heroes of Sri Lanka
