= Edwin Wijeyeratne =

Sri Lankan lawyer, politician and diplomat

Hon. Sir Edwin Wijeyeratne KBE
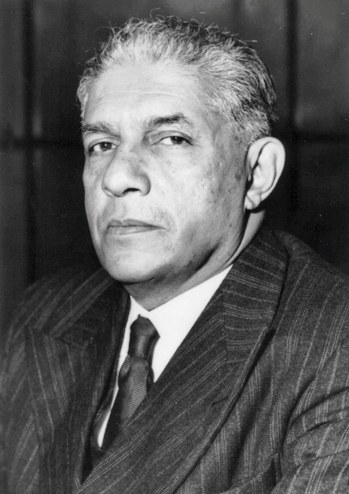

Minister of Home Affairs and Rural Development
- In office 22 July 1948 – 28 February 1951
- Prime Minister: D. S. Senanayake
- Preceded by: Oliver Ernest Goonetilleke
- Succeeded by: Oliver Ernest Goonetilleke

Member of State Council of Ceylon for Kegalle
- In office 20 June 1931 – 7 December 1935

Member of the Senate of Ceylon
- In office 1947–1951

High Commissioner for Ceylon to the United Kingdom
- In office 1951–1954
- Monarch: Elizabeth II
- Prime Minister: D. S. Senanayake; Dudley Senanayake; Sir John Kotelawala
- Preceded by: Oliver Goonetilleke
- Succeeded by: Claude Corea

High Commissioner for Ceylon to India
- In office 1955–1957
- Monarch: Elizabeth II
- Prime Minister: Sir John Kotelawala, S. W. R. D. Bandaranaike
- Preceded by: C. Coomaraswamy
- Succeeded by: Richard Aluwihare

Personal details
- Born: Edwin Aloysius Perera Wijeyeratne; 8 January 1889
- Died: 19 October 1968 (aged 79)
- Party: United National Party
- Spouse: Leela née Pethiyagoda
- Children: Tissa; Nissanka; Manel; Cuda
- Occupation: lawyer, politician, diplomat
- Profession: Advocate

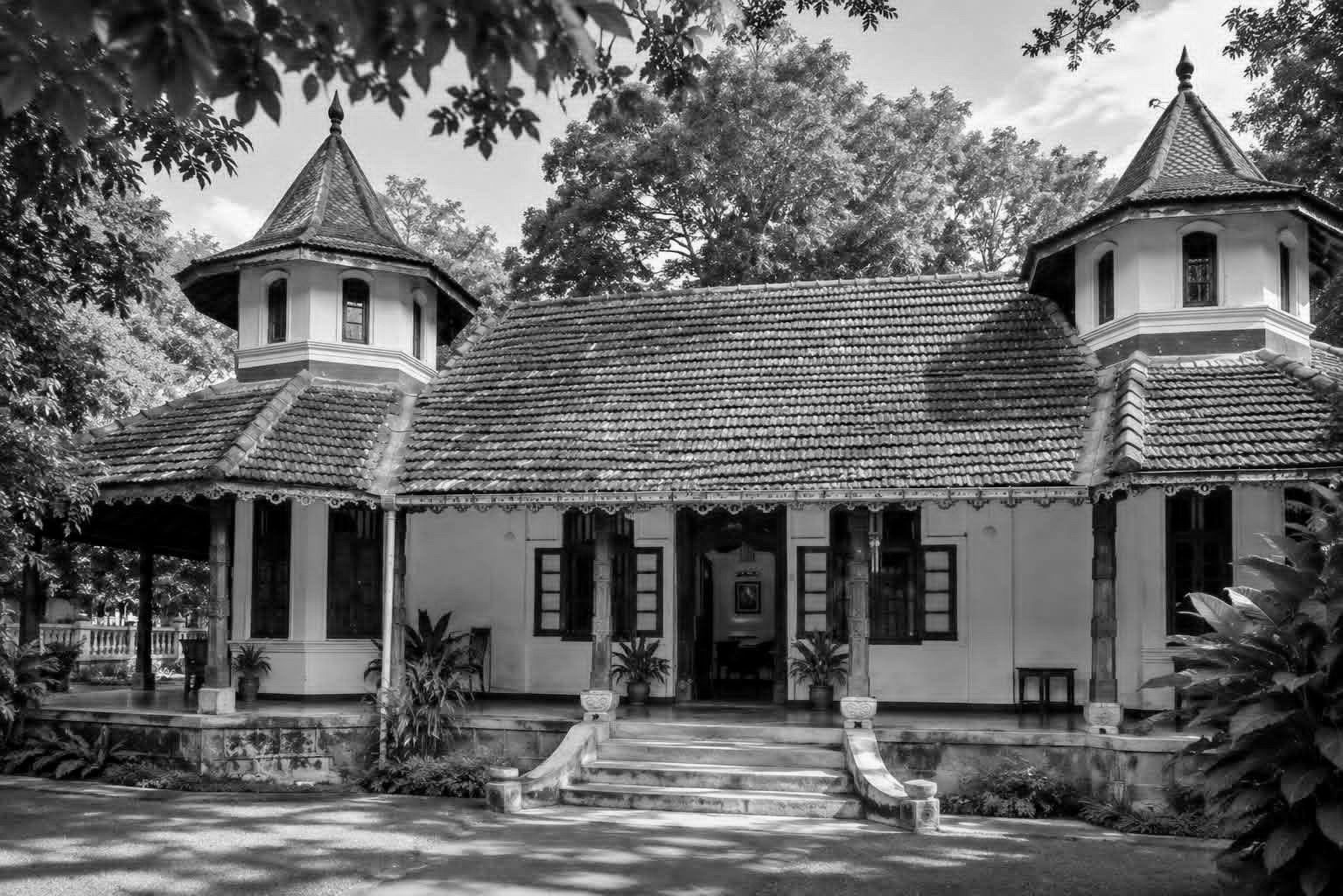
Buddenipola Walauwa, Kegalle, Sri Lanka - The ancestral home of Sir Edwin Wijeyeratne & Lady Leela Wijeyeratne (The Buddenipola Walauwa in Kegalle is now owned by the Government of Sri Lanka & is currently used as a hostel for students of Kegalu Balika Vidyalaya, Kegalle, Sri Lanka)

Sir Edwin Aloysius Perera Wijeyeratne KBE (Sinhala: ශ්‍රිමත් එඩ්වින් ඇලෝසියස් පෙරේරා විජයරත්න) (8 January 1889 – 19 October 1968), known as Edwin Wijeyeratne, was a Sri Lankan lawyer, politician, diplomat, and one of the founding members of the Ceylon National Congress and the United National Party. He was a Senator and Minister of Home Affairs and Rural Development in the cabinet of D. S. Senanayake. He thereafter he served as Ceylonese High Commissioner to the United Kingdom and Ceylonese High Commissioner to India

== Early life and education ==
Born on 8 January 1889 in Rambukkana, Sri Lanka Wijeyeratne came from a family that traced its roots to the Kotte Kingdom, which had fled during the Portuguese invasion. His father was Gabriel Perera Wijeyeratne, a notary public and his mother was Catherina Wickremasinghe Jayasekera (née Tennekoon), daughter of Jayasekera Tennekoon, a notary from the Four Korales in Kegalle. The eldest child in the family, he grew up in the Buddenipola Walauwa in Kegalle.

Wijeyeratne received his primary education at the village school in Rambukkana. When nine years old, he transferred to Handessa Village School in Gampola, where he stayed at the home of his future wife, Leela Pethiyagoda. He was subsequently educated at St. Mary's College, Kegalle, before completing his secondary education at St. Joseph's College, Colombo where he passed the Cambridge Senior Exam with Honors and won fifteen prizes at his final school prize-giving.

== Early career ==
After completing school, he taught at Lorenz Tutory whilst pursuing an early career in journalism, where he worked under Armand de Souza.

== Legal career ==
While working as a journalist, Wijeyeratne studied law at the Ceylon Law College and qualified as an Advocate in 1929 at the age of 30. He then established his legal practice in the unofficial bar in his home town Kegalle, specializing in Civil law and Kandyan law, and in Buddhist ecclesiastical law till 1949. He was an expert in Civil and Kandyan Law, and in Buddhist Ecclesiastical Law.

== Political career ==
=== 1915 riots ===
During his early days in journalism, Wijeyeratne became political secretary to Sir Ponnambalam Ramanathan and was one of the co-founders of a political group, the Young Lanka League. He was arrested by the British colonial authorities during the 1915 riots, accused of subversive writings and activities due to his agitation for self-rule. Others who faced imprisonment without charges included F. R. Senanayake, D. C. Senanayake, D. S. Senanayake, Baron Jayatilaka, Dr. C. A. Hewavitarne, W. A. de Silva, Arthur V. Dias, John Silva, Piyadasa Sirisena and A. E. Goonesinha who went on to play a prominent part in the independence movement.

=== Ceylon National Congress and the State Council ===
Wijeyeratne was a founding member of the Ceylon National Congress which was founded by Sir Ponnambalam Arunachalam and Sir James Peiris in 1919. He was elected to the State Council of Ceylon in 1931 from Kegalle, where he served until 7 December 1935. He did not stand for re-election at the State Council in 1936 and return to his legal practice. On 21 December 1940, Wijeyeratne was appointed President of the Ceylon National Congress. His Joint Secretaries were Dudley Senanayake and JR Jayawardene. During this period he was chosen to lead the Ceylon National Congress delegation to London. A famous story at the time was in 1944 when the Soulbury Commission was on their way to Kandy, D. S. Senanayake had stationed Wijeyeratne bare-bodied, in a paddy field in Kegalle. There, he was introduced to the commissioners as a typical Sinhala farmer and who spoke in English to the commissioners and impressed on them the need for Ceylon to obtain self-government. A special invitation was thereby sent to Ceylon by Jawaharlal Nehru and the Indian Congress to visit India for a discussion regarding the independence of Ceylon. Wijeyeratne, D. S Senanayake, George E. De Silva, J. R. Jayawardene, Sir Claude Corea and H. W. Amarasuriya were among the delegates.

=== United National Party and the Minister of Home Affairs & Rural Development ===
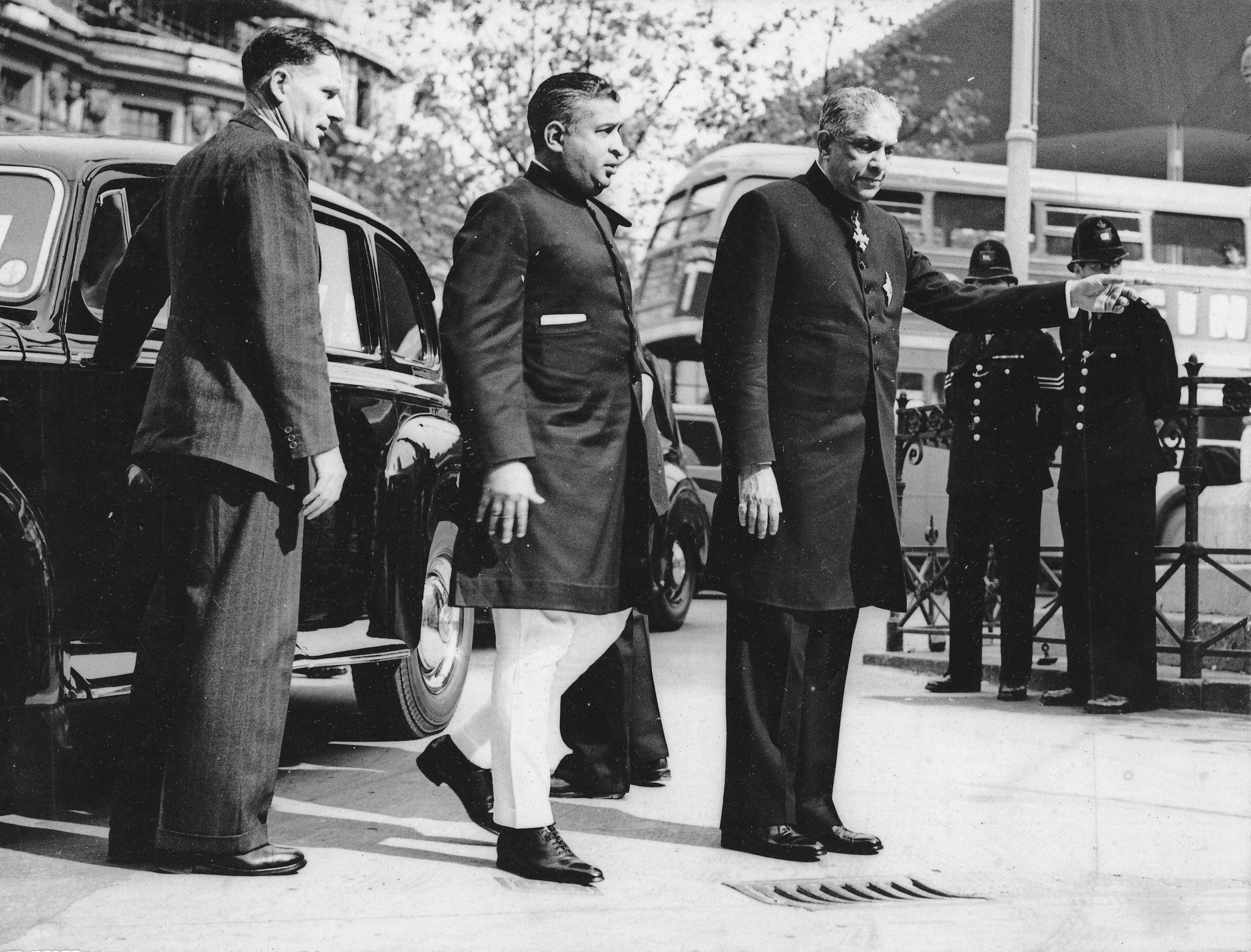
Sir Edwin Wijeyeratne with Prime Minister Dudley Senanayake

In 1947, Wijeyeratne became a founding member of the United National Party and was appointed to the Senate of Ceylon which was a non-elected upper house of parliament. There he served as acting Leader of the Senate. He subsequently succeeded Sir Oliver Goonetilleke as Minister of Home Affairs and Rural Development in D. S. Senanayake's cabinet in July 1948. He was a member of the Commission on the Death Penalty which first recommended the abolishing the death penalty from Ceylon in 1948. While Minister of Home Affairs and Rural Development, Wijeyeratne served as the Chairman of the select committee to select the National Anthem for Sri Lanka. Namo, Namo, Matha was subsequently selected as the country's national anthem. He resigned as Minister and Senator in February 1951 paving the way for Sir Oliver Goonetilleke to succeed him and return to his former post on his return from London.

== Diplomatic role ==
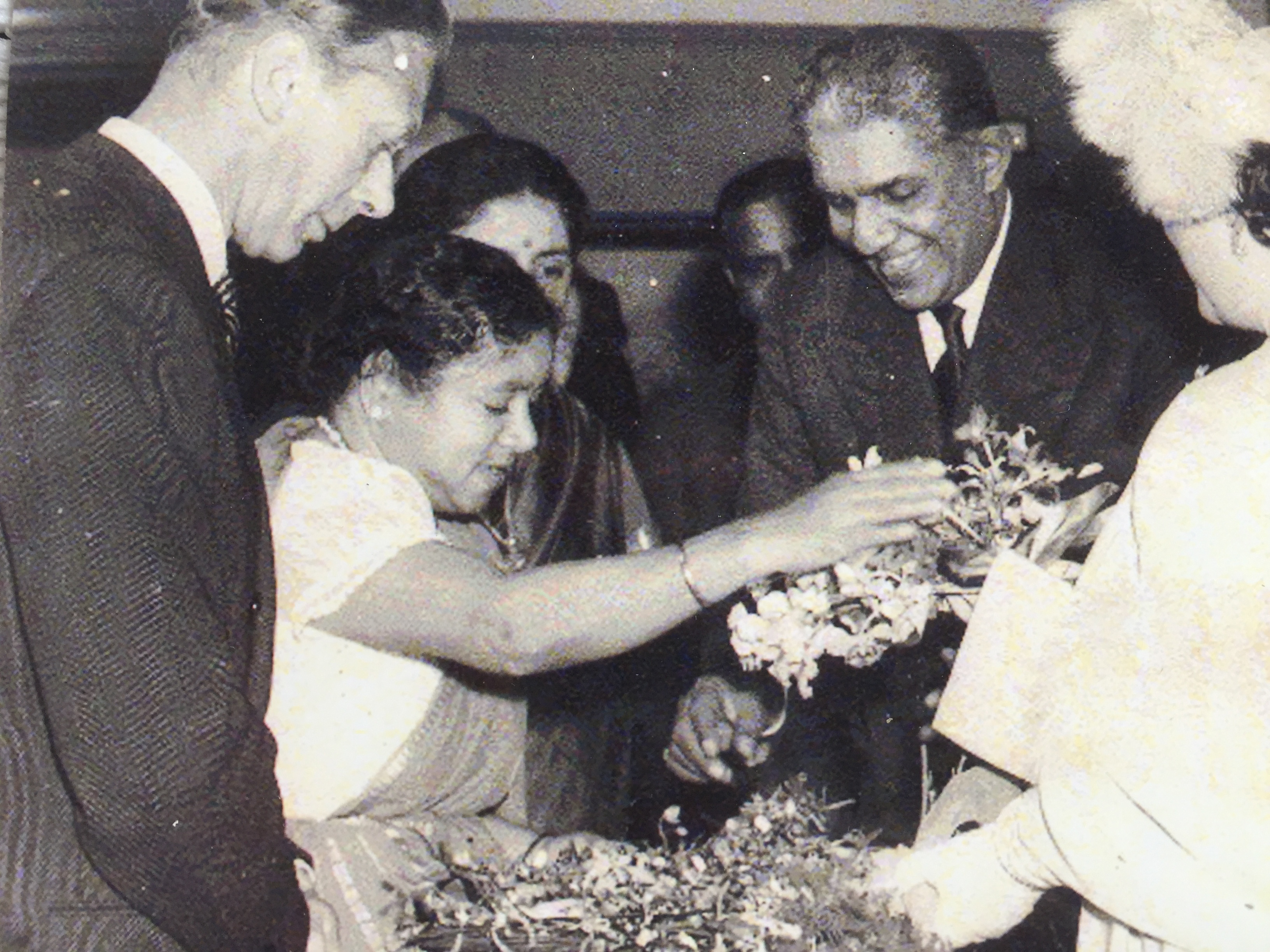
Edwin and Leela Wijeyeratne with King George VI and Queen Elizabeth in London, 1951

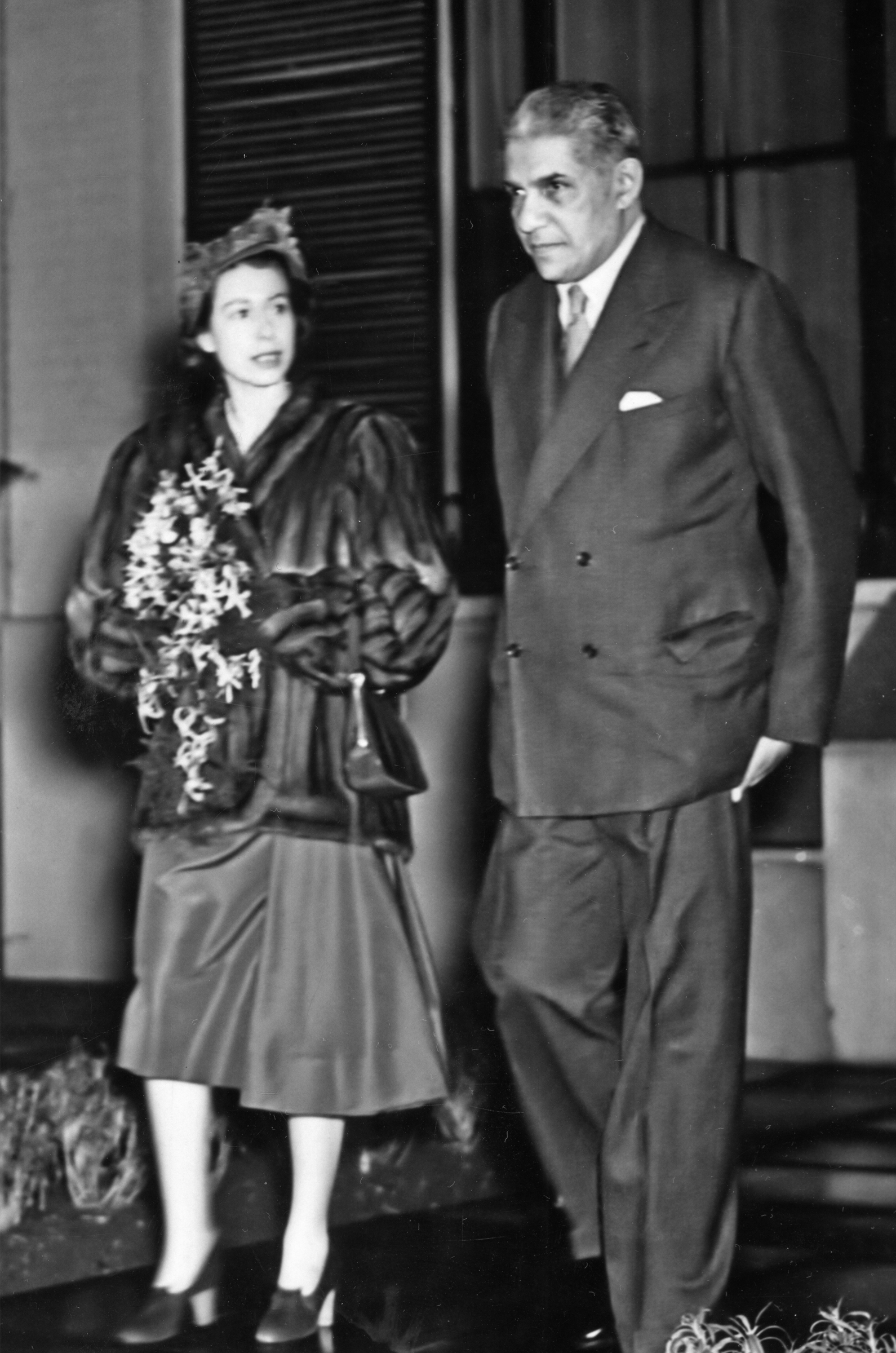
Sir Edwin Wijeyeratne with Elizabeth II, Queen of Ceylon, 1953

In 1952, Wijeyeratne was appointed Ceylonese High Commissioner to the United Kingdom, succeeding Sir Oliver Goonetilleke in turn and was knighted the year after in the 1953 New Year Honours as a Knight Commander (Civil Division) of the Order of the British Empire by Queen Elizabeth II at Buckingham Palace. As the Ceylonese High Commissioner, Wijeyeratne was involved in strengthening diplomatic relations between Britain and Sri Lanka. Wijeyeratne and his wife were visited at their residence in London on three occasions by Queen Elizabeth II and Prince Philip. In 1954, Wijeyeratne was recalled home and Sir Claude Corea succeeded him as High Commissioner to the United Kingdom. In 1955, he was appointed Ceylonese High Commissioner to India, where he served till 1957 and was succeeded by Sir Richard Aluvihare.

== Family life ==
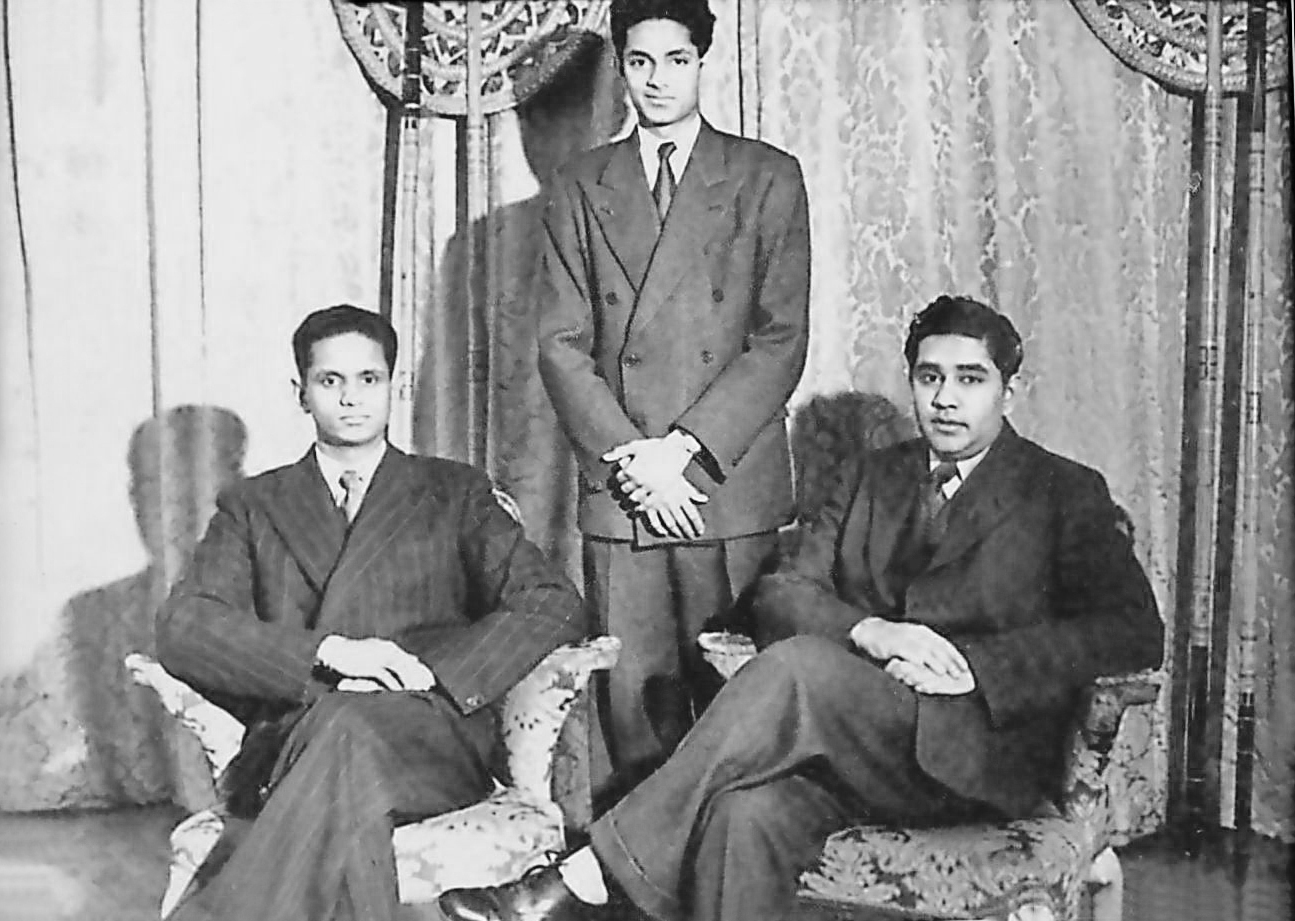
Tissa, Nissanka and Cuda

Wijeyeratne married Leela Pethiyagoda from the Meewaladeniya Walauwa in Gampola and had three sons and a daughter. The eldest, Tissa Wijeyeratne was a Barrister at Law and served as the Additional Secretary to the Ministry of External Affairs and Defence, as Sri Lankan Ambassador to France and to Switzerland, and as Senior Advisor (Foreign Affairs) to Prime Minister Sirimavo Bandaranaike. His second son, Dr Nissanka Wijeyeratne, was former Minister of Education, Higher Education and Justice, Diyawadana Nilame (Chief lay Custodian) of Temple of the Tooth, and later the Sri Lankan Ambassador to the Russian Federation and former member of the governing body of UNESCO. The youngest son, Dr Cuda Wijeyeratne is a consultant psychiatrist.

== Later life ==
Sir Edwin Wijeyeratne died on 19 October 1968 in Kegalle.

== See also ==
- List of political families in Sri Lanka
- Sri Lankan Non Career Diplomats
