= Tikiri Bandara Panabokke II =

Ceylonese colonial era legislator, lawyer and diplomat

Hon. Sir Tikiri Bandara Panabokke Adigar

Minister of Health
- In office 1931–1936

Ceylon's Representative in India
- In office 1945–1946
- Preceded by: Baron Jayathilake
- Succeeded by: M.W.H de Silva

Personal details
- Born: 28 March 1883 Gampola, Ceylon
- Died: 2 September 1963 (aged 80) Sri Lanka
- Education: Trinity College, Kandy, Royal College Colombo, Colombo Law College
- Occupation: Proctor

Sir Tikiri Bandara Panabokke II, First Adigar, JP, UM (known as Sir Tikiri Bandara Panabokke Adigar ) (28 March 1883 – 2 September 1963) was a Ceylonese, prominent colonial era legislator, lawyer and diplomat. He was the first Minister of Health in the State Council and second representative of the Government of Ceylon to India. He was the last person appointed by the British Government of Ceylon to the post of Adigar.

== Early life and education ==
Born Walala, Patha Dumbara on 28 March 1883 to Tikiri Bandara Panabokke Snr and his second wife Halangoda Kumarihamy, daughter of Halangoda Rate Mahattaya.

Panabokke Jnr received his primary education at the Walala Village School, and went to Trinity College, Kandy and Royal College Colombo, where he played cricket for his college team. His class mates at Royal College where A Padmanadan (son of Sir Ponnambalam Arunachalam), B.F. de Silva and Stanley Obeysekara. For higher studies he entered Colombo Law College and passed out as a Proctor in 1905.

== Legal career ==
He practiced law at the Magistrate Courts of Gampola and the District Courts of Kandy. He was appointed as Magistrate of Gampola for six months in 1928 and was appointed Crown Proctor.

== Political career ==
In 1907 he was elected a member of the Local Board, Gampola and was re-elected every two years until he resigned his seat in 1924. In 1921 he was nominated as the Kandiyan member to a Legislative Council of Ceylon along with Meedeniya Adigar. In 1931, the introduction of universal adult franchise he was elected from Gampola to the State Council of Ceylon which had been created after reforms of the legislature replacing the Legislative Council. There he was elected as the first Minister of Health to head the State Council Committee on Health and was a member of the first Board of Ministers. During his tenor as Minister, he built a new hospital in Gampola and played a key role in controlling the Malaria epidemic of 1933. In the 1936 State Council election, Panabokke lost to R.S.S. Gunawardena, while attempting to retain the Gampola constituency.

In 1935 he was appointed as chairman of the Kandyan Law Commission and he became the first Ceylonese to be elected chairman of the board of the Tea Research Institute Talawakele, where he served from 1943 to 1945. In 1945 he succeeded Sir Baron Jayatilake as Ceylon Government's representative in India. He was a member of the Kandy National Museum Advisory Committee.

== Honors ==
In 1940 he was appointed to the honorary post of First Adigar and retained the title of Adigar till his death in 1963 apron which it was discontinued with no new appointments made by the post independence government of Ceylon. His family donated his ceremonial adigar dress to the National Museum Kandy. He was knighted as a Knight Bachelor in the 1944 Birthday Honours for public services in Ceylon.

== Philanthropy ==
A devout Buddhist, he was responsible for the construction of the Sangaraja Pirivena Kandy and closely associated Anunanayake Thero of Malwatte, Amunugama Vipassi Thero who later was the Maha Nayaka of Malwatte Vihare. He was the founder of the Vidyartha Society, established in 1937, its main objective being to provide educational facilities for children in the Kandyan rural areas. The Vidyartha College was one of the primary achievements of this society. He funded the construction of the Panabokke Clinic in Gampola.

He established the Gamini Panabokke Trust Fund under section 47 of the Ceylon University ordinance, providing funds to Medical Students of the University of Peradeniya in need of financial assistance. One of the trustees of the fund is the Mahanayaka Thero of Malwatte Vihare.

He died on 2 September 1963 at his ancestral Walauwa, in Elpitiya Village, Weligalle Gampola.

== Family ==
He married Manthri Keppetipola, grand daughter of Monarawila Keppetipola Disawe. His eldest son Theodore Braybrooke Panabokke became a Deputy Minister of Justice & Agriculture, Member of Parliament and Ceylon's High Commissioner to India.

== See also ==
- Sri Lankan Non Career Diplomats

Diplomatic posts
Preceded by Baron Jayathilake	Ceylonese representative in India; 1947–1948	Succeeded by M.W.H de Silva
