= Doric de Souza =

Sri Lankan politician (1914–1987)

Anthony Theodoric Armand "Doric" de Souza (1914–1987) was a Sri Lankan Trotskyist politician, Senator, Professor of English and Marxist theoretician.

Born to Goan journalist Armand de Souza, who was the editor of the Ceylon Morning Leader and a founding member of the Ceylon National Congress, Doric was educated at as a young child at St Bridgets Convent, and then at St. Joseph's College, Colombo as well the University College, Colombo where he graduated with a BA honours in English. After graduating he received a scholarship to the University of London and on his return was appointed as a lecturer in the English Department of the University College, Colombo.

He was interested in the field of Linguistics - as well the phonetic transcriptions of speech in the English language.

A member of the Trotskyist political party Lanka Sama Samaja Party, he became active in its underground work specially during World War II, when LSSP was banned for undermining the war effort. This was at a time when even Esmond Wickremesinghe was in the underground. He assisted Colvin R de Silva and N.M. Perera in breaking out of jail and smuggled them to India. On several trips to India he was arrested by the Indian Police.

In 1946 he was elected to the Colombo Municipal Council and held the seat till 1952 when he resigned to take up the post of Senior Lecturer in the English Department in Peradeniya at the University of Ceylon. In 1957 elected to the Senate and served till 1969. That year he retired from the University of Ceylon and was appointed as Associated Professor of English of the Vidyalankara University in 1970 and remained there till 1982.

He left academia to serve as Permanent Secretary to the Minister of Plantation Industries and Constitutional Affairs under Minister Colvin R de Silva during the Bandaranaike regime.

He married his student Violet, (1915- 2006) who also graduated from the University College in Colombo, and later completed her postgraduate work in librarianship in London, and served as the Associate Librarian at the Peradeniya University (1953- 1968) and the Head University Librarian at the University of Colombo from 1968 till 1977.
