= National Hero of Sri Lanka =

Highest award of Sri Lanka, bestowed by the president

- Type: Title
- Awarded for: "An especially meritorious contribution to the historical struggle or national interests of the Democratic Socialist Republic of Sri Lanka"
- Presented by: the President of Sri Lanka

Highlights
- Total recipients: Unknown; approximately 135 in the Island's history.

Precedence
- Next (higher): None
- Next (lower): Parama Weera Vibhushanaya, Sri Lankabhimanya

National Hero is a status an individual can receive in Sri Lanka for those who are considered to have played a major role in fighting for the freedom of the country. The status is conferred by the President of Sri Lanka. The recipients of the award are celebrated on a Sri Lankan national holiday, National Heroes’ Day, held annually on 22 May. Every year, the President and general public pay tribute by observing a two minutes silence in their memory. The individuals are also celebrated on Sri Lanka Independence Day, held on 4 February. In this, the President or Prime Minister will typically address the nation with a speech honouring the National Heroes. The award has only been awarded to Sri Lankan citizens, but is not limited to this group.

== History of the award ==
The award of "National Hero of Sri Lanka" is currently the supreme civilian decoration in precedence in Sri Lanka. To date, the award has only been awarded posthumously.

The status of ‘Sri Lanka National Hero’ is a civil honour bestowed on an individual recognised and declared as ‘Patriotic Hero’ who fought for the freedom of the motherland. The award focuses on those who led the Uva Wellassa Great Rebellion (1817–1818), the Matale rebellion (1848) and, the Sri Lankan independence movement.

From 1948 to 1972, the nation was known as the Dominion of Ceylon, with its national day, known as Sri Lanka Independence Day being held annually on 4 February. It declared itself a republic on 22 May 1972. Yearly, the National Heroes are celebrated on this day.

== Recipients ==
Recipients of the award range from the 18th century to the 20th century. The recipients include Pandara Vanniyan, a Vanni chieftain, who died during a revolt against the British and Dutch in Sri Lanka. Other recipients are 19 leaders of the Great Rebellion of 1817–18 (including Keppetipola Disawe, late Dissawa of Uva), 49 participants of the Great Rebellion of 1817–18 who were sentenced to death by the Martial Court and 32 participants of the Great Rebellion of 1817–18 who were declared as "betrayers" and expelled to Mauritius by the Martial Court. The final 2 groups were made national heroes on 11 September 2017. The 19 Leaders of the Great revolution were made National Heroes on 8 December 2016.

=== Matale rebellion ===
The Matale rebellion, also known as the Rebellion of 1848, took place in Ceylon against the British colonial government under Governor Lord Torrington, 7th Viscount Torrington. It marked a transition from the classic feudal form of anti-colonial revolt to modern independence struggles. It was fundamentally a peasant revolt. For their role in the rebellion, Veera Puran Appu and Gongalegoda Banda were made National Heroes.

=== Sri Lankan independence movement ===
The Sri Lankan independence movement was a peaceful political movement which was aimed at achieving independence and self-rule for the country of Sri Lanka, then British Ceylon, from the British Empire. The switch of powers was generally known as peaceful transfer of power from the British administration to Ceylon representatives, a phrase that implies considerable continuity with a colonial era that lasted 400 years. It was initiated around the turn of the 20th century and led mostly by the educated middle class. It succeeded when, on 4 February 1948, Ceylon was granted independence as the Dominion of Ceylon. Dominion status within the British Commonwealth was retained for the next 24 years until 22 May 1972 when it became a republic and was renamed the Democratic Socialist Republic of Sri Lanka. The following persons were awarded as "National Heroes of Sri Lanka" for the part they played in the Sri Lankan independence movement.

==== List of recipients: ====
- Anagarika Dharmapala
- C. W. W. Kannangara
- Cheruka Weerakoon
- D. R. Wijewardena
- Don Stephen Senanayake
- E. W. Perera
- Fredrick Richard Senanayake
- Henry Pedris
- James Peiris
- Ponnambalam Arunachalam
- Ponnambalam Ramanathan
- Tuan Burhanudeen Jayah
- A. Ekanayake Gunasinha
- Arthur V. Dias
- Charles Edgar Corea
- Sir Don Baron Jayatilaka
- George E. de Silva
- Gratien Fernando
- Henry Woodward Amarasuriya
- Herbert Sri Nissanka
- Leslie Goonewardene
- M. C. Siddi Lebbe
- Madduma Bandara Ehelapola
- N. M. Perera
- Philip Gunawardena
- S. Mahinda
- Susantha de Fonseka
- Thomas Amarasuriya
- Victor Corea
- Vivienne Goonewardene
- W. A. de Silva
- Walisinghe Harischandra
- Wilmot A. Perera

=== Gallery ===
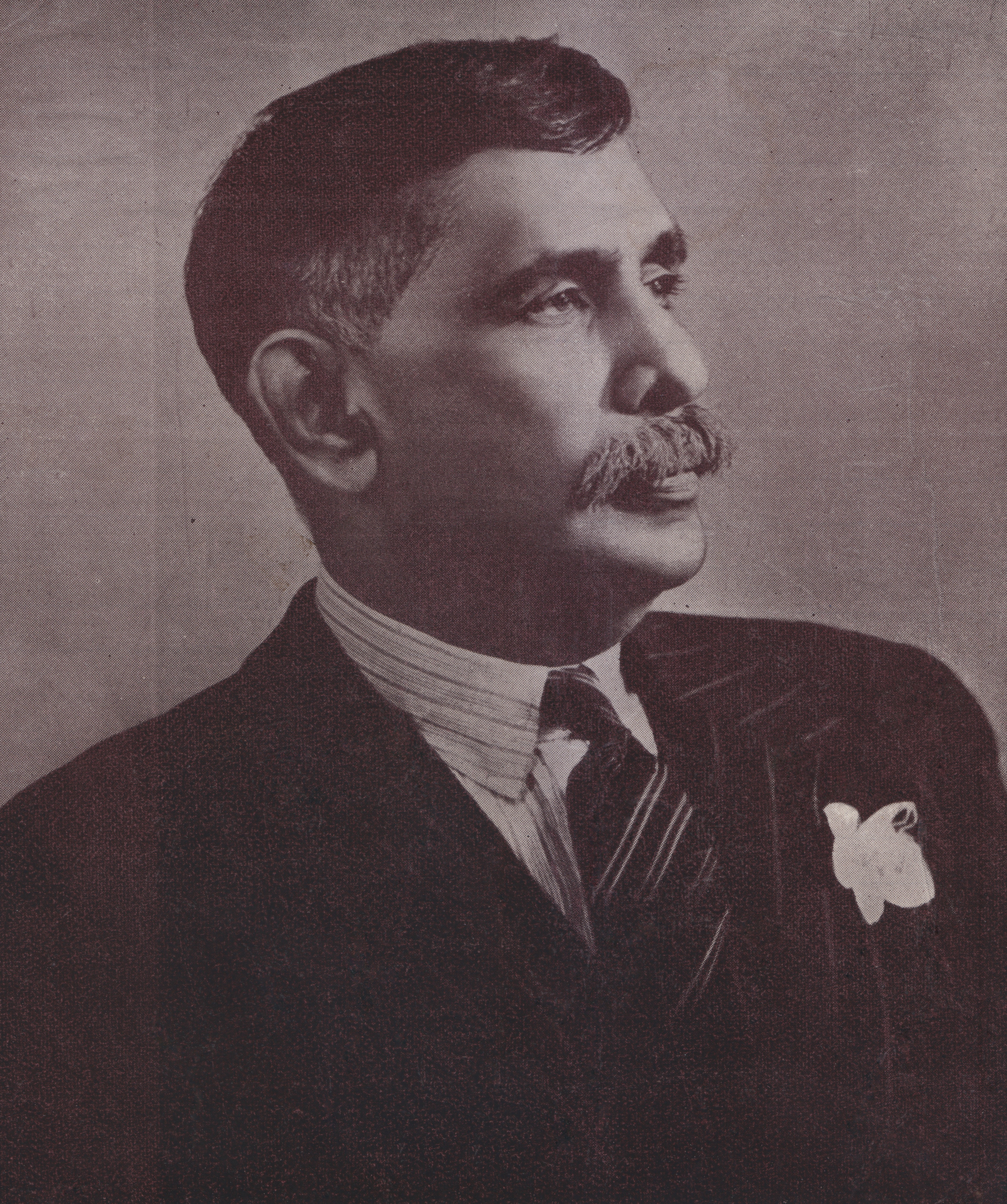
D. S. Senanayake, Ceylon's first prime minister

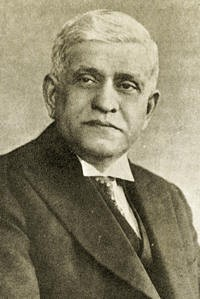
Sir Don Baron Jayatilaka, Leader of the House of the State Council of Ceylon

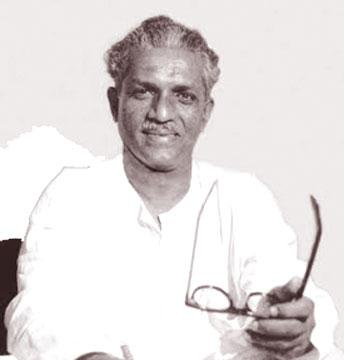
Philip Gunawardena, the "Father of Socialism in Ceylon"

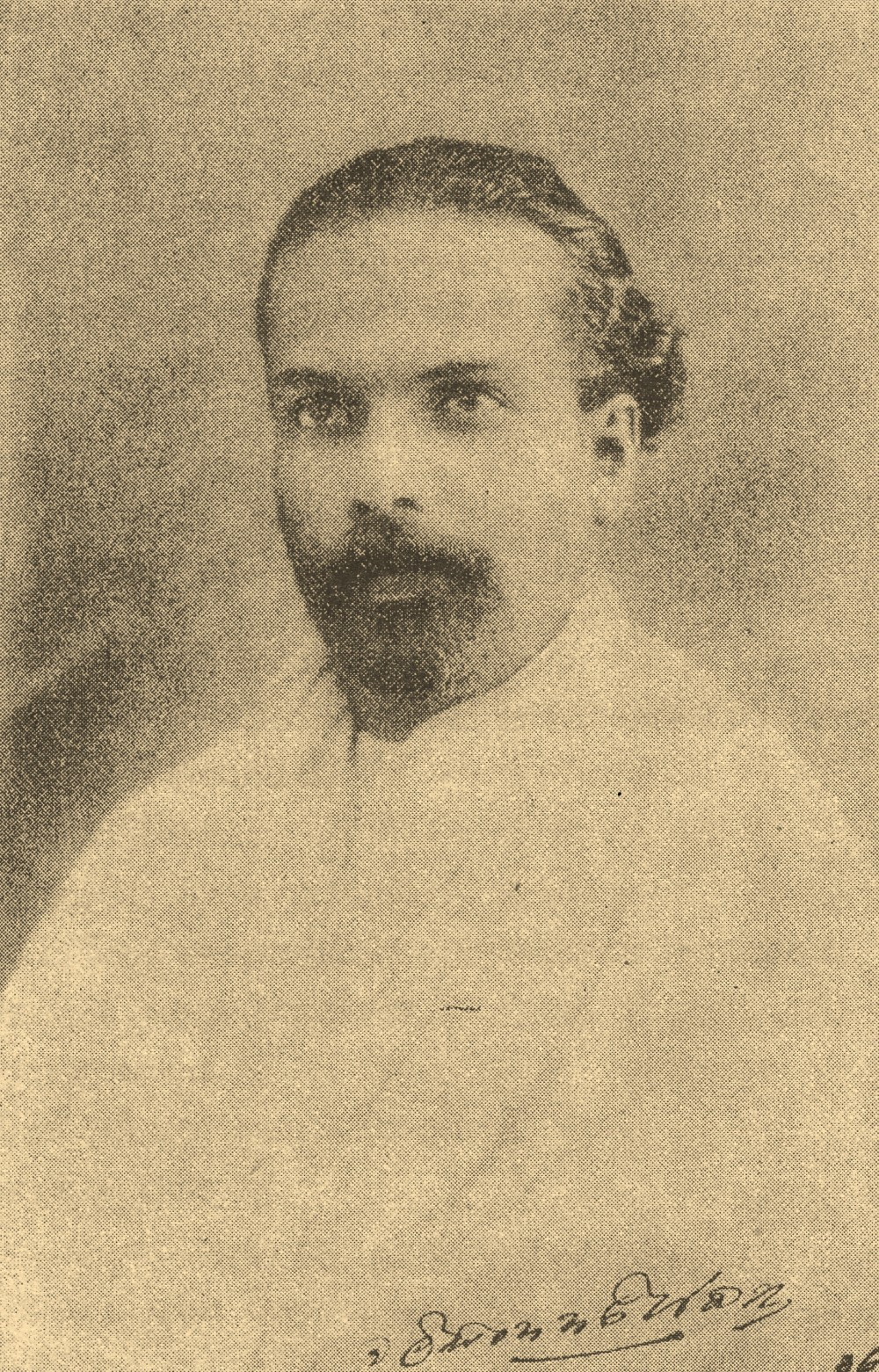
Walisinghe Harischandra, social reformer and Buddhist revivalist

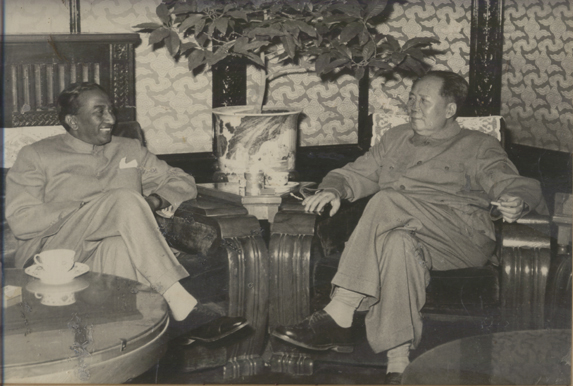
Wilmot A. Perera, first Ceylonese ambassador to China, with Chairman Mao

== See also ==
- Parama Weera Vibhushanaya
- Orders, decorations, and medals of Sri Lanka
- Utuwankande Sura Saradiel
