= E. W. Perera =

Ceylonese barrister, politician, and freedom fighter

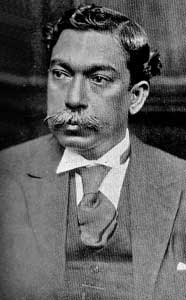

Personal details
- Born: Edward Walter Perera; 11 December 1875 Unawatuna, Galle, Ceylon (now Sri Lanka)
- Died: 15 February 1953 (aged 77)
- Education: Royal College Colombo
- Occupation: Politics
- Profession: Barrister

Edward Walter Perera (Sinhala: එඩ්වර්ඩ් වෝල්ටර් පෙරේරා ) (11 December 1875 – 15 February 1953) was a Ceylonese (Sri Lankan) barrister, politician and freedom fighter. He was known as the "Lion of Kotte" and was a prominent figure in the Sri Lankan independence movement, served as an elected member of the Legislative Council of Ceylon and the State Council of Ceylon.

== Early life and education ==
Edward Walter Perera was born on 11 December 1875 at Unawatuna, Galle the son of Edward Francis Perera (a Proctor of Colombo) and Johana Matilda, daughter of Mudliyar William David Perera Jayawickrema Seneviratne of Thalpaththuwa, Galle. Raised as a devoted Christian, Perera was educated at Royal College, Colombo and was the first editor of the Royal College Magazine. He served as a sub-editor of the newspaper Examiner while studying law at the Ceylon Law College and was called to the Bar as an Advocate in May 1900. Having gone to England for further studies in the Middle Temple, he became a Barrister in 1909. Perera was a member of the first Reform Deputation in 1910.

== Role in the Sri Lankan independence movement ==
During the First World War, in 1915 commercial and ethnic rivalries erupted into riots throughout British Ceylon by Buddhists and Christians against Muslims. Fearing a possible uprising, the inexperienced Governor of Ceylon Sir Robert Chalmers declared martial law on 2 June 1915 and on the advice of Inspector General Herbert Dowbiggin began to suppress the riots by issuing orders to the colonial police and military to summarily execute anyone they deemed to be a rioter. Many prominent Sri Lankans such as D. S. Senanayake, D. R. Wijewardena, Arthur V. Dias, Dr. Cassius Pereira, Dr. W. A. de Silva, F.R. Dias Bandaranaike, H. W. Amarasuriya and A.H. Molamure were imprisoned and Captain D.E.Henry Pedris, a militia commander, was executed on the charge of mutiny.

E. W. Perera together with D. R. Wijewardena, successfully traced the banner of the last King of Sri Lanka. It subsequently became the flag of the Dominion of Ceylon.

A memorandum was drafted at a secret meeting held at Perera's residence, initiated by Sir James Peiris with the participation of Sir Ponnambalam Ramanathan. Before presenting it to the His Majesty's Government, the support of the British members of parliament and the press in England had to be obtained. Travelling to England by sea was dangerous due to the presence of German submarines in the region. Abandoning a promising career at the Bar, Perera undertook the task of going over to England by obtaining permission saying he was going to do some research in the British Museum. To his advantage, the British treated him as a scholarly Christian Barrister rather than an independence activist. He was accompanied by George E. de Silva. In England, he was joined by Sir Ponnambalam Ramanathan and later by Sir D.B Jayatilaka and they presented the memorandum to the Secretary of State for the Colonies, pleading for the repeal of martial law and describing the atrocities committed by the Police led by Dowbiggin. The mission was a success. The British government ordered the release of the leaders who were in detention. Several high officials were transferred. A new Governor, Sir John Anderson was sent to replace Sir Robert Chalmers with instructions to inquire and report to His Majesty's Government. Perera's effort was greatly appreciated and he was thereafter referred to as the Lion of Kotte.

It was also Perera who with the help of D. R. Wijewardena, the press baron (grandfather of current president of Sri Lanka Ranil Wickramasinghe) traced the location of the banner of last King Sri Vikrama Rajasinghe, the last king of the Kingdom of Kandy to the Royal Hospital Chelsea, where it had been kept since the surrender of the Kingdom to the British in 1815. The recovered banner became a focal point in the independence movement and it became the flag of the Dominion of Ceylon upon its independence in 1948.

== Political career ==
He was a member of the Legislative Council of Ceylon, first as member from Western Province BH Division (1920) and then representing the Kalutara District (1924). As President of the Ceylon National Congress, he led its delegation before the Donoughmore Commission in 1926/27. Sincere to his convictions, he opposed the granting of universal adult suffrage and broke with his colleagues in the Congress. He agitated for full freedom and formed the All-Ceylon Liberal Association with Sir James Peiris. However, he was elected Member of the State Council of Ceylon for the Horana seat (1931) by a majority of 12,432 votes and served till 1935. He contested the 1943 Kelaniya by-election following the resignation of incumbent D. B. Jayatilaka and was defeated by J. R. Jayewardene.

== Later life ==
He was a scholar and wrote several books. He died on 15 February 1953 at the age of 77.

== See also ==
- National Heroes of Sri Lanka
- Sri Lankan independence movement
- Sri Lankan independence activist
- Legislative Council of Ceylon
