= Piyadasa Sirisena =

Piyadasa Sirisena පියදාස සිරිසේන
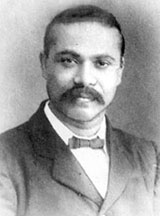
- Piyadasa Sirisena
- Born: Pedric Silva; 31 May 1875; Induruwa, Ceylon
- Died: 22 May 1946 (aged 70); Colombo, Ceylon
- Known for: Sinhalese novels Sri Lankan Independence Movement; Temperance Movement; Journalism
- Spouse: Cecilia Sirisena

Piyadasa Sirisena was a Ceylonese pioneer novelist, patriot, journalist, temperance worker and independence activist. He was the author of some of the bestselling Sinhalese novels in early 20th century. A follower of Anagarika Dharmapala, Siresena was the most popular novelist of the era and most of his novels were on nationalistic and patriotic themes. Piyadasa Sirisena used the novel as a medium through which to reform society and became one of the leaders in mass communication in the early part of the 20th century. Piyadasa Sirisena is widely considered as the father of Sinhalese novel. Some of his novel were reprinted even in the 21st century.

== Life and career ==
Piyadasa Sirisena was born in 1875, in the countryside village called Athuruwella in Induruwa located three kilometers south of Bentota in Galle District. Sirisena was from a middle class influential family in the area. The main source of living in that area was the agriculture. He moved to Colombo after getting employment in a furniture establishment at a younger age. Piyadasa Sirisena who was inspired by Anagarika Dharmapala, was interested in the movement of Sinhalese Buddhist nationalism. The wide range of Piyadasa Sirisena's skills made him a prolific thinker and writer during the early years of the 20th century. His impact on the revival of nationalism through his writings remains unrivaled in the modern history of Sri Lanka.

Sirisena began his career by making contributions to publications of Irvin Gunawardena who was a businessman. The publication-‘Situmina’ was first published in 1895 and subsequently Sirisena contributed articles of ‘Sarasavi Sandaresa‘ news paper edited by a leading journalist of that era known as Hemendra Sepala Perera. It was Perera who laid the platform for Piyadasa Sirisena to launch his distinguished literary career which impacted Ceylonese society to a larger extent. Piyadasa Sirisena published the Sinhalese newspaper "Sinhala Jathiya" in 1905. He also served as the editor of the 'Sinhala Baudhaya' published by the Mahabodhi Society at one time. In most of his literary and journalistic work, the core theme was nationalism and revival of Buddhism. Ceylon at this time had an increasing number of literate citizens who were well aware of their political rights and their ancient Buddhist heritage.

It was through 'Sarasavi Sandaresa' that Piyadasa Sirisea was able to produce his first novel Roslin and Jayatissa. He wrote over twenty novels out of which the first was Jayatissa and Rosalyn. It was the most successful novel of Sirisena’ novels as it was sold more than 25,000 copies in two editions. None of Sinhala novels of that period had been as successful as Jayatissa and Rosalyn. Piyadasa Sirisena also was the first novelist in the country to produce detective stories. He wrote five of detective novels and one of them "Dingiri Menika" was made into a highly successful film in the mid 1950s. Besides novels he was also a poet of exceptional talent. Most of the numerous poems he wrote were on Buddhist, nationalist and historical themes that invoked patriotic feelings in the readers mind. In addition to these Piyadasa Sirisena wrote books which included philosophical views.

Piyadasa Sirisena had to undergo two jail terms during his life time, both after Sinhalese Muslim riots that took place in 1915 and 1918. His work as a Buddhist and independence activist always attracted suspicion of British Ceylon government. His first jail term was in 1916 and lasted 60 days when then government imposed Marshal law during the Sinhala-Muslim riots of that year which led to the imprisonment of many fellow patriots like D. S. Senanayake, F. R. Senanayake, the Hewavitharana brothers, Sir D B Jayatilleke etc. The trial-at-bar which he faced was for provocation. He had written an editorial in his newspaper in which it was alleged that Sirisena had encouraged the people to rise against the government. But the government prosecutors failed to prove the charges and Sirisena was released with a fine.

The colonial British governments' policy on liquor and the spread of liquor consumption as a result in Ceylon was a cause of growing displeasure among the Sinhalese Buddhists of the early 20th century. An anti-liquor campaign gently took shape and within a short time it had the support of the many leading Buddhists of the country. This soon formed a Temperance movement that conducted several anti-liquor campaigns in different parts of the country. Buddhist leaders such as Anagarika Dharmapala, Dr. W. A. de Silva, Arthur V. Dias and Walisinghe Harischandra took part in theses campaigns. Piyadasa Sirisana also took part as an active protester against liquor and soon became a leading figure of the Ceylonese Temperance movement. He used his Sinhala Jathiya newspaper to urge people against the habit of liquor. He also used his oratorical skills to popularize and move forward their temperance movement, whenever anti-liquor meetings were held in various parts of the country.

Sirisena was a tireless worker who slept only four hours a day. He was married to Cecilia and had a family of nine children. He was the head of a printing establishment with 40 employees, who all depended on his success as a literary figure. After rendering a yeoman service to his motherland Piyadasa Sirisena died on May 22, 1946, at the age 71 years. Sri Lanka Post issued a postage stamp to commemorate his services to the country in 1979.

== Works (selection) ==
Piyadasa Sirisena was a skilled writer of both prose and verse in Sinhala and used the novel as a tool of educating the masses. His objective was to raise their awareness of the lost glory of the Sinhalese people. His first novel on a happy marriage with Jayatissa and Rosalin as the main characters was a bestseller by any standard in Sri Lanka. He was also a journalist and his newspaper called the “Sinhala Jatiya” (Sinhala Nation) reinforced the message of his novels. The following are some of his notable works.

- Vasanavanta Wivahaya Hevat Jayatissa saha Roslin
- Yantam Gelavuna
- Ishta Deviya
- Maha Viyavula
- Ad-bhuta Agantukaya
- Parewarthanaya
- Wimalatissa Hamuduruwange Mudal Pettiya
- Swarnamali Maha Kawya
- Dampal Siritha
- Jayawardena Sathakaya
