= Ceylon Morning Leader =

Ceylon English language daily newspaper

- Type: Daily newspaper
- Founded: 1 July 1907
- Ceased publication: 1932
- Language: English
- City: Colombo
- Country: Ceylon
- OCLC number: 751696687

The Ceylon Morning Leader was an English language daily newspaper in Ceylon. In 1907 the De Soysa family bought the proprietary rights of the defunct Ceylon Standard and started publishing the Ceylon Morning Leader. Ownership of the newspaper later passed to a syndicate comprising W. A. de Silva, C. E. A. Dias, Charles Peiris and James Peiris. De Silva later became the sole owner.

The Ceylon Morning Leader was edited by Armand de Souza until his death in 1921. The paper was then edited by J. L. C. Rodrigo for a short period. The paper campaigned for democratic reforms to the Legislative Council of Ceylon and supported indigenous arts and culture which were largely ignored by other English language newspapers. In December 1914 the Supreme Court of Ceylon jailed de Souza for a month after he wrote critical editorials but he was released after six days due to protests. The paper was noted for its critical coverage of the 1915 anti-Muslim riots and the declaration of martial law. In 1926 S. W. R. D. Bandaranaike wrote a series of six articles in the paper in which he advocated federalism.

Newspaper baron D. R. Wijewardena bought the Ceylon Independent and forced the Ceylon Morning Leader out of business in 1932.
