= List of high commissioners of Sri Lanka to India =

Mahishini Colonne

Sri Lanka Ambassador to India
- Incumbent
- Assumed office 2025
- President: Anura Kumara Dissanayake
- Preceded by: Kshenuka Senewiratne

The High Commissioner of Sri Lanka to India is the Sri Lankan envoy to India. Countries belonging to the Commonwealth of Nations typically exchange High Commissioners, rather than Ambassadors. Though there are a few technical differences (for instance, whereas Ambassadors present their diplomatic credentials to the host country's head of state, High Commissioners are accredited to the head of government), they are in practice one and the same office.

Prior to the establishment of formal diplomatic ties with India after Ceylon gained independence in 1948, the Government of British Ceylon maintained an official representative to the British Raj in India from 1942 to 1948. The Sri Lankan High Commissioner to India is concurrently accredited as Ambassador to both Bhutan and Afghanistan. Sri Lanka also maintains two Consuls-Generals in Chennai and Mumbai.

== Representatives of the Government of Ceylon ==
Representative	Start of Term	End of Term
Sir Baron Jayathilake	1942	1945
Sir Tikiri Bandara Panabokke Adigar	1945	1946
M.W.H de Silva	1947	1948

== High Commissioners ==
High Commissioner	Start of Term	End of Term
Sir Arunachalam Mahadeva, KCMG	1948	1950
C. Coomaraswamy	1950	1955
Sir Edwin Wijeratne	1955	1957
Sir Richard Aluwihare, KCMG, CBE	1957	1963
Shirley Amerasinghe	1963	1966
Siri Perera	1967	1969
N. Q. Dias	1970	1972
Justin Siriwardena	1974	1977
Arthur Basnayake	1977	1978
T.B.Panabokke	1978	1982
Bernard Tilakaratna	1982	1989
Dr Stanley Kalpage	1989	1991
Dr Neville Kanakeratne	1991	1994
Mangala Moonesinghe	1995	2000
Dr Senake Bandaranayake	2000	2002
Mangala Moonesinghe	2002	2005
C. R. Jaysinghe	2005	2009
Prasad Kariyawasam	2009	2014
Sudarshana Senavirathne	2014	2015
Esala Weerakoon	2015	2018
Austin Fernando	2018	2020
Milinda Moragoda	2020	2023
Kshenuka Senewiratne	2023	2025
Mahishini Colonne	2025	present

== See also ==
- List of heads of missions from Sri Lanka
- Deputy High Commission of Sri Lanka, Chennai
