= Young Men's Buddhist Association =

Sri Lankan youth organization

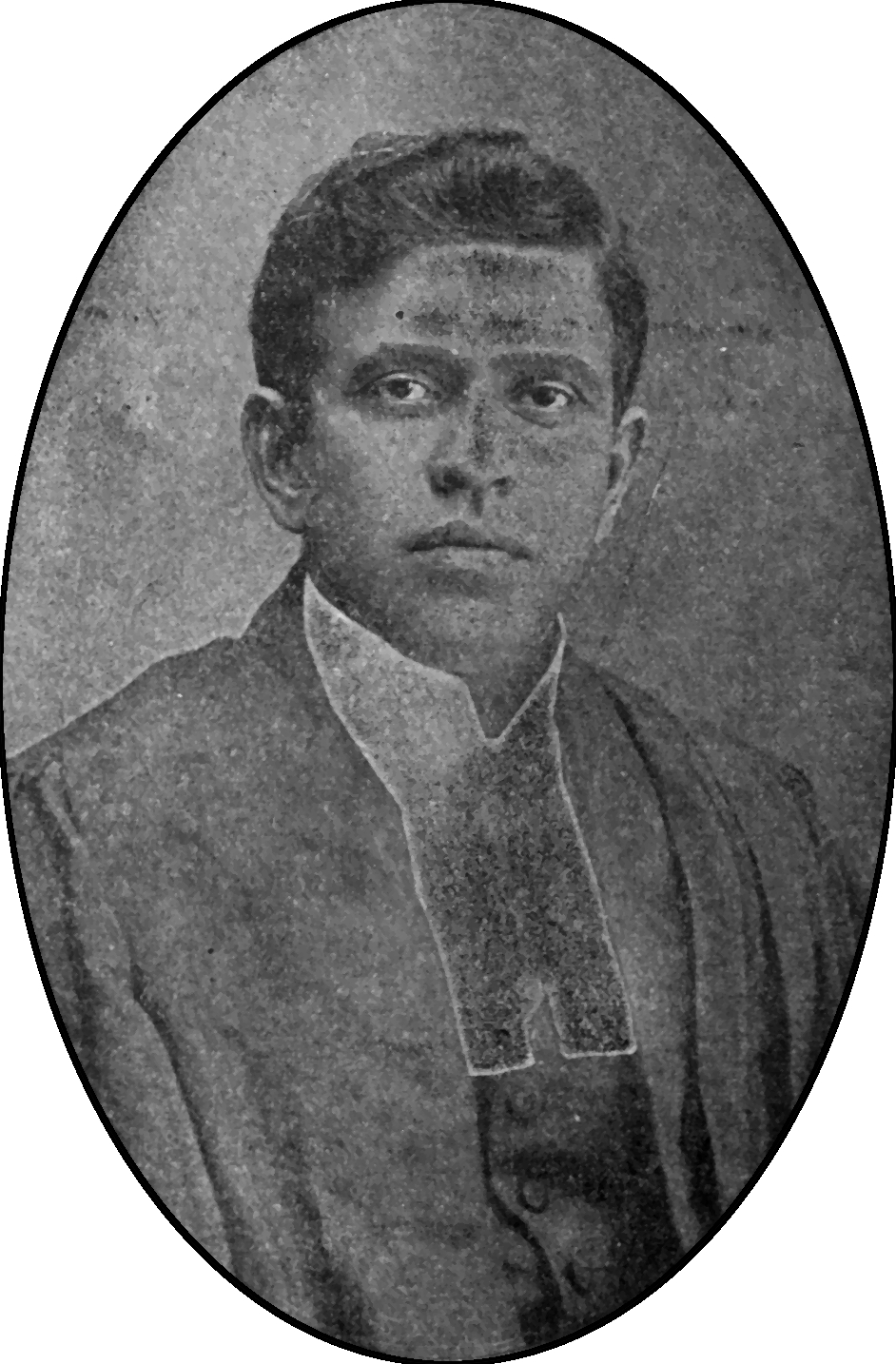
Barrister Don Baron Jayatilaka, President of the YMBA Colombo, pre 1920.

The YMBA, or Young Men's Buddhist Association, was created in Sri Lanka in 1898. The main founder was C. S. Dissanayake as part of a bid to provide Buddhist institutions as an alternative to YMCA, otherwise known as the Young Men's Christian Association. It has had many famous presidents such as philanthropists Ernest de Silva and Henry Woodward Amarasuriya. It also exists in other countries, although they are independent organizations.

== See also ==
- Young Men's Buddhist Association (Burma)
