= Armand de Souza =

Ceylonese newspaper editor and democratic activist

- Born: 29 October 1874; Assagao, Portuguese Goa
- Died: 17 May 1921 (aged 46)
- Occupation: Journalist
- Known for: Founder of Ceylon Morning Leader
- Children: 4, including Doric
- Relatives: Fabianne Therese (great-great-grandaughter)

Armand de Souza (29 October 1874 – 17 May 1921) was a Ceylonese newspaper editor and democratic activist.

== Early life ==
De Souza was born in Assagao, Portuguese Goa, to a Roman Catholic family belonging to the Saraswat Brahman community. He was the tenth descendant of Roulu Camotin who had converted to Catholicism at the point of the sword in 1537, adopting Diego de Souza as his name at his baptism. Armand de Souza was the son of advocate Antonio Narcisso Vasconcellos de Souza, himself the son of advocate and Latin scholar, Antonio José de Souza.

Orphaned at a young age, he was left in the care of an aged grandmother who arranged that the boy's uncle, Dr Lisboa Pinto, should adopt him. Pinto was the Honorary Consul of the United States in the Colony of Ceylon. He enrolled the fifteen-year-old de Souza at the Royal College Colombo. Principal John Harward of Royal College encouraged de Souza's passion for history and English literature. De Souza cut his editorial teeth as the editor of the Royal College Magazine. At school he was known for his writing and oratory. De Souza was expected to be called to the Bar in the family tradition, but he fell out with his uncle and made his own way in life.

== Career ==
De Souza received his journalistic training at The Times of Ceylon where he worked for eight years. He moved to the Standard because he disagreed with the editor of the Times on public issues. He founded the Ceylon Morning Leader in July 1907 at age thirty-three. He worked as chief reporter and sub-editor, while the chief editor's position went to J. T. Blazé. However, the proprietors insisted that De Souza take over, replacing Blazé's gentler prose with more forceful rhetoric. Over five years "he brought about a renaissance among the different communities in regards to matters social, political and intellectual. He was greatly responsible for the national awakening among the different classes and communities of the permanent population of the island…..to a very large extent to the awakening of the Singhalese in particular". He advocated for constitutional reform, particularly the right to elect four members, including one 'Educated Ceylonese Member' to the Legislative Council that until 15 November 1911 consisted of official and appointed members. He then fought for the election of all unofficial members according to constituencies and for an unofficial majority in the Legislative Council. He was opposed to racially-based representation in the Legislative Council and to the representation of the two major races respectively by two families over several generations.

In 1914 De Souza was indicted for writing an editorial entitled "Justice at Nuwara Eliya" that suggested that Thomas Arthur Hodson was sympathetic to the views of the constabulary when he tried cases as District Judge and Police Magistrate. He was represented by K.C. Bawa before a three-judge panel of the Supreme Court (Renton, Pereira and De Sampayo) that sentenced him to one month imprisonment, reportedly without a proper hearing. A public protest ensued. Harry Creasy wrote, "[i]t is as important to every man and woman in this colony that the Press should have full liberty to criticise and praise or condemn the actions of the government and all public officers as it is that the Courts should sternly repress any undue license in such criticisms or condemnations". The Press joined supported De Souza. After six days in his cell, De Souza was released by order of Sir Robert Chalmers, the governor. He was led from the prison in a chariot, to much public clamour.

== Works ==
De Souza documented the race riots in Ceylon in 1915 in a book entitled Hundred days: Ceylon under martial law in 1915. A copy is in the library of Leonard Woolf, now in the Washington State University Libraries special collection. (Note: Woolf's' library is now in the Washington State University Libraries special collection.)

== Death ==
De Souza died of enteric at the age of 47 in 1921. His obituary in the Ceylon Morning Leader on 18 May 1921 read:

The news of Mr Armand de Souza's death came as a great shock, for I had not even known he was ill. I believe Ceylon could hardly have had a greater loss. Few realise how much he did for us all. How many for instance, give him the credit for his work during the war? In his paper, by far the most widely read, he was constantly cheery and brave, and did more to keep up the spirits of Ceylon during that time than any one man, to my mind.

Again, he had a lion's share in the introduction of the reforms, and I am glad he saw them in, with the promise of things to come. But I need not chronicle his public deeds. Comparatively few knew what an excellent lecturer he was. He was there seen at far greater advantage than his paper, for he was there free to be himself. And he worked then for peace and better understanding between all races in Ceylon, and gave his hearers his great dreams and visions.

He was intense and vital in all he did. Very delicate, he did an enormous amount of work, and like Stevenson always showed a 'Morning Face'. He was a gallant and brave spirit and did not seek his own.

No one who knew him at all closely would fail to be struck by the beauty of his family life, and his chivalrous devotion to those who had first claim on him. His was a great generous nature and he spent himself freely, and Ceylon has lost in him one of her very best.

He made mistakes and made enemies, as anyone of his integrity and energy must. I have come under his lash as much as anyone in days long past. But I never found any personal animus in him, and he was always ready to hear the other side and to revise his judgments. I found him straight, and he was my friend.

— A. G. Fraser, Principal of Trinity College, Kandy

== Personal life ==
He was father of Senator Doric de Souza of the LSSP (the Lanka Sama Samaja Party, Sri Lanka's Trotskyist party) and Torismund de Souza, Editor of the Times, as well as Aleric and Lena who both died young. Australian composer Gina Ismene Chitty is a granddaughter, and actress Fabianne Therese is his great-great-granddaughter.

== Sources ==
- "Mr. Armand de Souza". The African Times & Orient Review. June 1913, p. 40.
- De Souza, Armand (1913), The Case for a Decent Reform". A Lecture. Mimeo
- De Souza, Armand. Hundred days: Ceylon under martial law in 1915. The Ceylon Morning Leader 1919. 318 pp.
- Dharmavaradan, C. A. (1922), A Sketch of the Life and Career of Armand de Souza, late editor, Ceylon Morning Leader ... With a preface by Hon. Mr. A.C.G. Wijeyekoon., C. Arumugenpillay, OCLC 771133948
