= John Harward =

British educationist

John Henry Harward (27 May 1858 – 30 September 1932) was a British educationist and Principal of Royal College Colombo (1892–1902).

Born in Wirksworth, Derbyshire, he was educated at Durham School (1869–1877) and University College, Oxford (1878–1881) and graduated B.A. First in classical Moderations.

Starting a career in teaching he became the second classics Master at Brighton College (1882–1891). In 1892 he was appointed Principal of Royal College Colombo till 20 August 1902. Concurrently he acted as Director of Public Instruction (1898–1902) while being principal and was Director of Public Instruction January 1903 to 1915.

On retirement he settled down in Warwick, Queensland, Australia.
