= Ceylon National Congress =

Ceylon National Congress ලංකා ජාතික කොන්ග්‍රසය இலங்கை தேசிய காங்கிரஸ்
- Abbreviation: CNC
- Founder: Ponnambalam Arunachalam
- Founded: 11 December 1919
- Dissolved: 1947
- Succeeded by: United National Party
- Ideology: Sri Lankan independence Nationalism; Anti-imperialism
- Political position: Centre-right

The Ceylon National Congress (Sinhala: ලංකා ජාතික කොන්ග්‍රසය Lanka Jathika Kongrasaya) (CNC) was a political party in colonial-era Ceylon founded on 11 December 1919. It was founded during a period when nationalism and support for the Sri Lankan independence movement grew quite intensely amidst British colonial rule in Ceylon. It was formed by members of the Ceylon National Association (founded in 1888) and the Ceylon Reform League (founded in 1917).

The Ceylon National Congress played an instrumental role in the Sri Lankan independence movement. Sir Ponnambalam Arunachalam was the founding president of the party. In October 1920, Sir James Peiris was elected president, staunchly supported by F. R. Senanayake and future prime minister D. S. Senanayake. Other former presidents include D. B. Jayatilaka, E. W. Perera, C. W. W. Kannangara, Patrick de Silva Kularatne, H. W. Amarasuriya, W. A. de Silva, George E. de Silva and Edwin Wijeyeratne. The Ceylon National Congress would pave the way for the formation of the United National Party. In 1943, D. S. Senanayake resigned from the Congress because he disagreed with its revised aim of achieving full freedom from the British Empire, preferring the Dominion status.
