= Gratien Fernando =

Ceylonese mutineer

- Born: 1915; Colombo, Ceylon
- Died: 5 August 1942 (aged 26/27); Welikada Prison, Colombo, Ceylon
- Cause of death: Execution by firing squad
- Resting place: Kanatte Cemetery, Borella
- Known for: Cocos Island Mutiny
- Military service
- Allegiance: Ceylon
- Branch: Ceylon Defence Force
- Rank: Bombardier
- Unit: Ceylon Garrison Artillery
- Conflicts: World War II

Wathumullage Gratien Hubert Fernando CGA (1915 – 5 August 1942) was the leader of the Cocos Islands Mutiny and an agitator for the independence of Sri Lanka from the British.

Fernando was born to Sinhalese Buddhist parents. His father was a superintendent at the Ceylon Telegraph Office.

He went to school at St Thomas' College, Mt Lavinia. He was later converted to Roman Catholicism. This conversion led him to take sides with the Burgher mutineers in the future. He was impressed by the program of the Lanka Sama Samaja Party and by the anti-imperialist literature which it circulated but did not join the party. He was shipped off with his unit first to the Seychelles and later to Horsburgh Island in the Cocos Islands.

Here, he argued with his officers and agitated for action among his colleagues: his agenda was to create an increase in the support for Sri Lankan independence from British rule. He finally persuaded a core group to rebel, seize the island and signal the Japanese that they had done so; 30 out of 56 soldiers of his unit took part. On the night of 8/9 May, led by Fernando, men of the unit mutinied. However, their plan failed and the rebellion was suppressed the next day. The leaders of the mutiny were court-martialled and condemned within a week. The commanding officer on Cocos, Captain George Gardiner, an accountant in Colombo who obtained an emergency war commission, while focus of the mutineers' actions, also presided at the Field General Court Martial which convicted them.

Fernando’s father petitioned the army authorities to commute the death penalty and asked Sir Oliver Ernest Goonetilleke, the Civil Defence Commissioner, to intercede with Admiral Sir Geoffrey Layton, the British Commander of Ceylon. However, when Layton interviewed Fernando, he was adamant that he did not wish to be reprieved or pardoned. He told his family 'I’ll never ask a pardon from the British: that would disgrace the cause. Many years hence the World may hear my story'.

He was executed on 5 August 1942 at Welikada Prison, Ceylon, and two other mutineers shortly thereafter. They were the only British Commonwealth troops to be executed for mutiny during the Second World War. Fernando showed defiance to the end, his last words being "Loyalty to a country under the heel of a white man is disloyalty". He was buried at the Kanatte Cemetery in an unmarked grave.
