= James Peiris =

Hon. Sir James Peiris JP

Vice-President of the Legislative Council of Ceylon
- In office 1924 – 5 May 1930
- President: William Henry Manning; Cecil Clementi; Edward Bruce Alexander; Hugh Clifford; Murchison Fletcher; Herbert Stanley
- Preceded by: Position established
- Succeeded by: D. B. Jayatilaka

Personal details
- Born: 20 December 1856
- Died: 5 May 1930 (aged 73)
- Education: St John's College, Cambridge, Royal College, Colombo
- Occupation: Politician
- Profession: Barrister

Sir James Peiris JP (20 December 1856 – 5 May 1930) was a prominent leader in the Sri Lankan independence movement, the first elected Vice-President of the Legislative Council of Ceylon and the first native Governor of Ceylon (Acting).

== Early life and education ==
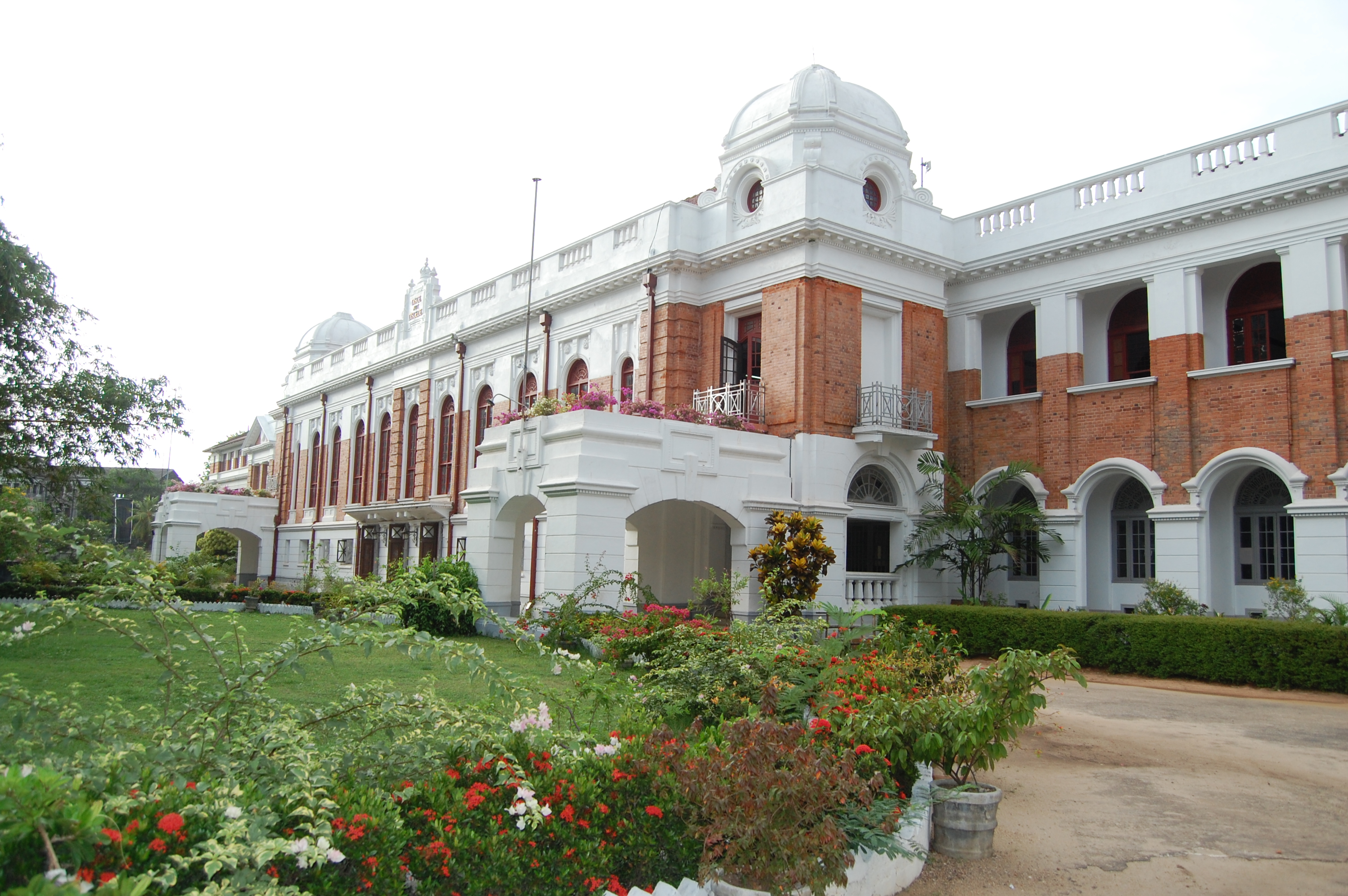
The young James Peiris was educated at the Royal College, Colombo.

Born on 20 December 1856 to T Martinus Pieris and Apolonia de Soysa, a wealthy and a traditional ship-owning family, who faced comparative poverty 15 years later along with the death of his father. Peiris was educated at Colombo Academy (now Royal College, Colombo) where he excelled in studies winning the Turnour Prize and the Shakespeare prize. He won the English University Scholarship in 1877 and proceeded to St John's College, Cambridge at the University of Cambridge. At Cambridge he had the rare distinction of obtaining a double first – a first class in the Law Tripos and a first class in the Moral Science Tripos. There he was the first non-European to be elected president of the Cambridge Union, in the Michaelmas term of 1882. Peiris was called to Bar at Lincoln's Inn in England thus becoming a barrister. He refused to join the Ceylon Civil Service and instead started a law practice. In 1902 he accepted for a short time the office of District Judge of Galle. As an advocate he played a pioneering role in constitutional reform.

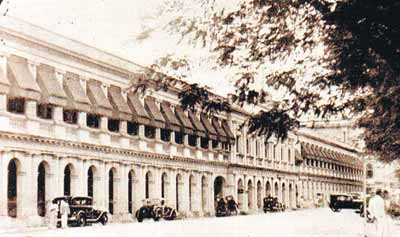
Peiris was elected Vice-President of the Legislative Council of Ceylon in 1924. The President was the Governor of Ceylon.

== Political career ==
In 1892, as president of the Ceylon National Association (founded by Sir Charles Henry de Soysa), Peiris led the campaign to abolish the 'paddy (grain) tax', for which he was recognised by the Cobden Club. It was the first instance that the tax was abolished in the recorded history of the island. Peiris's entry into politics was as a Member of the Colombo Municipal Council from 1898 to 1908 representing the Slave Island ward, and served on the Public Works Council. Though a reluctant politician at first, Peiris initiated constitutional reforms such as the abolition of the then system of racial representation and the introduction of the elective principle in place of nomination.

In 1915 Peiris led the campaign for a Royal Commission of Inquiry and the vindication of the reputations of those who had been falsely accused during the riots of 1915. Peiris was the chairman of the committee which was protesting the British Governor's handling of the riots and the unfair and discriminative treatment being meted out to Sinhala Buddhist leaders. As a Christian, although he was offered privileges and pressured by the ruling British, he fearlessly refused them and stuck to his principles. Seeing the horror unleashed by the governor and his advisers, he initiated and drafted a memorandum in great secrecy supported by other prominent members of society to bring it to the attention of the King and His Majesty's Government. It was taken to England hidden in the sole of a shoe by E. W. Perera, later joined by Peiris. As a result of this the governor Sir Robert Chalmers was recalled.

In 1920 Peiris was elected president of the Ceylon National Congress staunchly supported by D.S. Senanayake and F.R. Senanayake. Forming the Congress was a self-sacrificing effort by Peiris and the National Association, up until that time the most powerful lobby in Ceylon. He continued the struggle for reforms and promoted greater representation of natives in the government bureaucracy and the judiciary. He also campaigned to abolish the poll tax.

There was wide support for Peiris' nomination to the Legislative Council of Ceylon. On two occasions when nominations had to be made for the position of "an educated Ceylonese" James Peiris was passed over, notwithstanding his ability and integrity. Peiris also was opposed to the principle of nomination. Immediately the elective principle was introduced into the Legislative Council, Peiris was elected unopposed. At the same election his brother-in-law Sir Henry De Mel was also elected unopposed, on behalf of the Low Country Products Association. In 1922 Peiris led the fight against the Supply Bill which sought to increase taxation and led a walkout from the Legislative Council in protest.

In 1924 the legislative council was reconstituted with a majority of elected representatives. Peiris was elected as vice-president – a position he held until his death in 1930. The post of president was held nominally by the governor, and Peiris presided over the council and acted as officer administering the government. Peiris was appointed a justice of the peace for the whole island Govonor and was knighted in the 1925 Birthday Honours by King George V. He was the first Ceylonese occupant of Queens House as acting governor.

Peiris was first to propose the creation of a University College in Colombo and the means of financing it. Following the establishment of the University College, Colombo (later to become the University of Ceylon), Peiris was a Member of the advisory council of the new University College.

== Family and personal life ==
In 1889, Peiris married Grace de Mel, eldest daughter of Jacob De Mel (1839-1919) and Dona Helena née Ferdinando (1850-1906) and had two sons and two daughters; Ethel, Louise, Leonard and Herbert, later known as Devar Suriya Sena. His nephews included Harold Peiris, portraitist Harry Pieris and Archbishop Lakdasa De Mel. He was a devoted Christian and a standing committee member of the Church of England synod. He was a Fellow of the Colonial Institute, a president of the Sinhalese Sports Club, founding secretary of the Royal College Union, member of the Orient Club, founder of the Low-Country Products' Association, the Ceylon Social Service League, the Ceylon Social Reform Association and the Cheshire Home. He was also known for his ability and interest in horsemanship and farming.

== Legacy ==
Peiris is considered as one of the few distinguished Sri Lankan statesmen prior to its independence and is often referred to as the Father of Constitutional Reforms. Those vindicated due to his efforts became the subsequent leaders of the nation. When his portrait was unveiled in Parliament, the then prime minister, S. W. R. D. Bandaranaike stated: "Like Moses, James Peiris brought his people within sight of the promised land, but did not live to see its fulfilment". In his honour one of the major streets in Colombo is named Sir James Peiris Mawatha and so is Sir James Peiris Hall a Hall of Residence at the University of Peradeniya. The Sir James Peiris Memorial Prize is one of the prizes awarded annually at Royal College, Colombo.

== See also ==
- List of Cambridge Union Society presidents
- Sri Lankan independence movement
- Sri Lankan independence activist
- Legislative Council of Ceylon
- National Heroes of Sri Lanka
- George E. de Silva

== Sources & External links ==
- THE LIFE AND CHARACTER OF SIR JAMES PEIRIS, by L.J.M. COORAY
- Sir James Peiris (1856–1930) Scholar, Orator, Lawyer and Statesman
- Life and times of Sir James Peiris
- The Orient Club
