= Ponnambalam Arunachalam =

Ceylonese civil servant (1853–1924)

Sir Ponnambalam Arunachalam MLC CCS
- பொன்னம்பலம் அருணாசலம்
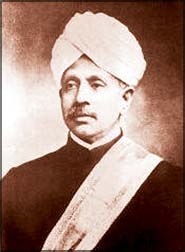

Member of the Executive Council of Ceylon
- In office 1912–1913

Member of the Legislative Council of Ceylon
- In office 1912–1913

President of the Ceylon National Congress
- In office 1919–1920

Personal details
- Born: P. Arunachalam; 14 September 1853 Colombo, Ceylon
- Died: 9 January 1924 (aged 70) Madurai, India
- Education: Christ's College, Cambridge
- Occupation: Civil servant
- Ethnicity: Ceylon Tamil

Ponnambalam Arunachalam (Tamil: பொன்னம்பலம் அருணாசலம், romanized: Poṉṉampalam Aruṇācalam; 14 September 1853 – 9 January 1924) was a Ceylonese civil servant and a member of the Executive Council of Ceylon and Legislative Council of Ceylon.

== Early life and family ==
Arunachalam was born on 14 September 1853 in Colombo in south western Ceylon in a Tamil family. He was the son of Gate Mudaliyar A. Ponnambalam, a leading government functionary, and Sellachi Ammai. He was the brother of P. Coomaraswamy and P. Ramanathan. Arunachalam was educated at Royal Academy, Colombo where he won many prizes including the Turnour Prize. After school he joined Christ's College, Cambridge in 1871 on a scholarship, graduating in 1874 with BA degree in law and history. He received an MA degree from Cambridge in 1880.

Arunachalam married Svarnambal, daughter of Namasivayam, in 1883. They had three sons (Padmanabha, Mahadeva and Ramanathan) and five daughters (Maheswari, Manonmani, Sivanandam, Pathmavathy and Sunthari). Sir Sangarapillai Pararajasingam was his son-in-law, having married Pathmavathy.

== Career ==
Arunachalam was called to the bar at Lincoln's Inn in 1875. He wanted to start a career in law but was persuaded by his maternal uncle Muthu Coomaraswamy to join the civil service. He sat the Civil Service Examinations in 1875 and became the first Ceylonese to enter the Ceylon Civil Service via open competition. His initial posting was at the Government Agent's office in Colombo. Thereafter he held numerous posts within the civil service: police court in Kandy; police magistrate and commissioner of requests at Kalpitiya, Puttalam, Matara, Avissawella, Pasyala, Matale, Kalutara and Colombo; and district judge in Chilaw, Kegalle, Kalutara, Batticaloa and Kurunegala.

Early on his career, Arunachalam's quality of work was noticed by Chief Justice John Budd Phear who recommended him to the Governor and Secretary of State. In 1887 Governor Arthur Hamilton-Gordon appointed Arunachalam acting Registrar-General and Fiscal of the Western Province, by passing 30 officers senior to Arunachalam. Fraud, corruption and inefficiency was endemic in the department and so Arunachalam successfully re-organised the department. He was appointed acting Commissioner of Requests in 1891 and Registrar-General in 1898.

Arunachalam was entrusted with managing the 1901 census by being appointed Superintendent of Census in 1900. He started codifying Ceylon's law but only managed to produce the first volume of A Digest of the Civil Law of Ceylon. Arunachalam was an official member of the Legislative Council of Ceylon and a member of the Executive Council of Ceylon between 1912 and 1913. (Note: Other sources say Arunachalam was a member of the Legislative Council of Ceylon from 1906 to 1913.) He retired from the civil service in 1913. He was knighted in February 1914.

Arunachalam's became interested in politics during his university days. He agitated for political reform whilst still working in the civil service. In retirement Arunachalam became involved in politics, founding the Ceylon National Association and the Ceylon Reform League, of which he was chairman, in 1917. He was one of the founders of the Ceylon National Congress (CNC) in 1919 and served as its first president from 1919 to 1920. Arunachalam left the CNC in 1921 following disputes about communal representation in the Legislative Council, which Arunachalam opposed, and the connivance of Sinhalese politicians which resulted in no Tamils being elected from Western Province at the 1921 legislative council election. He founded the Ceylon Tamil League in 1923.

In 1917 he became the first Ceylonese to be elected president of the Ceylon Branch of the Royal Asiatic Society. He founded the Senthamil Paripalana Sabai and was president of the Ceylon Saiva Paripalana Sabai. He and his wife founded the Sri Arunachaleswarar Temple at Mutwal. Arunachalam co-founded the Ceylon Social Services League in 1915 and served as its president. He was also involved in the fledgling trade union movement in Ceylon and founded Ceylon's first trade union, the Ceylon Workers' Welfare League, in 1919. He served as president of the Ceylon Workers' Federation from 1920 to 1921. Arunachalam led the campaign for a university in Ceylon and was known as the "father of the Ceylon University", having founded the Ceylon University Association in 1906. He died on 9 January 1924 in Madurai whilst on Hindu pilgrimage in southern India.

== Works ==
- A Revel in Bliss (1895).
- A Few Hymns of Manikka Vachaka and Thayumanavar (1897).
- Sketches of Ceylon History (1906, Ceylon National Review)
- A Digest of the Civil Law of Ceylon
- Studies and Translations from the Tamil
- Studies and Translations – Philosophical and Religious (1937)
