= 1st State Council of Ceylon =

1931–1935 meeting of the Sri Lankan legislature

2nd	→
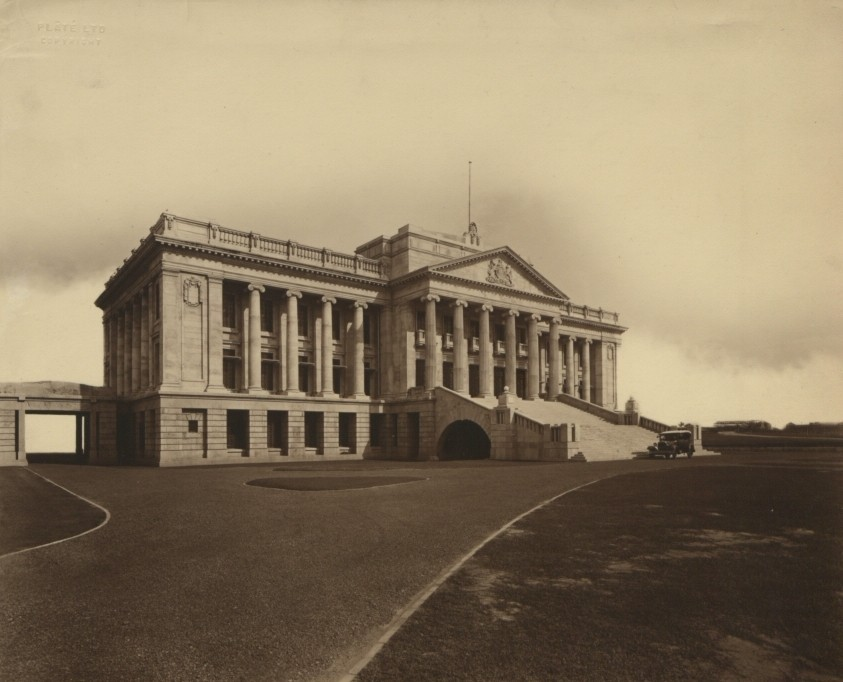

Overview
- Legislative body: State Council of Ceylon
- Meeting place: Old Parliament Building
- Term: 7 July 1931 – 7 December 1935
- Election: 13–20 June 1931
- Government: 1st Board
- Website: parliament.lk

State Councillors
- Members: 58
- Speaker: A. F. Molamure (1931–34); F. A. Obeysekera (1934–35)
- Deputy Speaker and Chairman of Committees: F. A. Obeysekera (1931–34); Susantha de Fonseka (1934–35)
- Deputy Chairman of Committees: M. M. Subramaniam
- Leader of the House: D. B. Jayatilaka

The 1st State Council of Ceylon was a meeting of the State Council of Ceylon, with the membership determined by the results of the 1931 state council election held between 13 and 20 June 1931. The parliament met for the first time on 7 July 1931 and was dissolved on 7 December 1935.

== Election ==
The 1st state council election was held between 13 and 20 June 1931 in 37 of the 50 constituencies. No nominations were received in four constituencies in the north of the country due to a boycott organised by the Jaffna Youth Congress. The remaining nine constituencies only had a single nomination each and consequently the candidates were elected without a vote. The remaining nine constituencies only had a single nomination each and consequently the candidates were elected without a vote. In addition the Governor nominated eight additional members, John William Oldfield, Maurice John Cary, I. X. Pereira, M. K. Saldin, V. R. S. Schokman, Evelyn Charles Villiers, Thomas Lister Villiers and Stewart Schneider.

The new state council met for the first time on 7 July 1931 and elected A. F. Molamure, F. A. Obeysekera and M. M. Subramaniam as Speaker, Deputy Speaker and Chairman of Committees and Deputy Chairman of Committees respectively. The seven chairman of the State Council's executive committees, who were members of the Board of Ministers, were also appointed. The State Council was ceremonially opened on 10 July 1931.

Following the end of the boycott in the north of the country by-elections were held in the four constituencies in early July 1934. The newly elected members entered the state council on 17 July 1934.

== Members ==
=== Deaths, resignations and removals ===
The 1st state council saw the following deaths, resignations and removals from office:

- 1931: Ratnasothy Saravanamuttu (Colombo North) unseated after being found guilty of corrupt practices by an election Judge. His wife Naysum was elected in the ensuing by-election.
- September 1931: Godfrey Edward Madawala (Naramala) died. W. H. de S. Jayasundara elected at subsequent by-election.
- August 1933: Cudah Ratwatte (Balangoda) resigned due to ill-health. T. G. Jayewardene elected at subsequent by-election.

=== List ===
Name	Appointed/ Elected	Constituency	Votes	Majority	Took office	Left office	Notes	^{Refs.}
E. W. Abeygunasekera	Elected	Nuwara Eliya	6,942	3,136	1931	1935		
H. W. Amarasuriya	Elected	Udugama			1931			
D. D. Athulathmudali	Elected	Matugama			16 June 1931	1935		
S. W. R. D. Bandaranaike	Elected	Veyangoda	-	-	4 May 1931			
Charles Batuwantudawe	Elected	Kalutara			1931		Minister of Local Administration (1931–35).	
Maurice John Cary	Appointed	European			8 October 1935			
Claude Corea	Elected	Chilaw			20 June 1931			
S. W. Dassenaike	Elected	Colombo South			1931			
Susantha de Fonseka	Elected	Panadura			20 June 1931		Deputy Speaker and Chairman of Committees (1934–35).	
Henry De Mel	Elected	Puttalam			18 June 1931			
George E. de Silva	Elected	Kandy			20 June 1931			
W. A. de Silva	Elected	Moratuwa			17 June 1931			
G. R. de Zoysa	Elected	Balapitiya			21 September 1935			
A. Fellowes-Gordon	Elected	Bandarawela	9,097		13 June 1931			
H. R. Freeman	Elected	Anuradhapura	8,311		13 June 1931			
A. E. Goonesinha	Elected	Colombo Central			13 June 1931			
Godfrey Edward Madawala	Elected	Narammala			13 June 1931	September 1932		
W. H. de S. Jayasundara	Elected	Narammala			14 January 1933			
D. P. Jayasuriya	Elected	Gampaha			13 June 1931			
D. B. Jayatilaka	Elected	Kelaniya	-	-	1931		Leader of the House (1931–35). Minister of Home Affairs (1931–35).	
T. G. Jayewardene	Elected	Balangoda			14 October 1933	1935	Succeeds Cudah Ratwatte.	
W. T. B. Karaliadda	Elected	Matale			12 June 1931			
C. W. W. Kannangara	Elected	Galle			1931		Minister of Education (1931–35).	
D. H. Kotelawala	Elected	Badulla	-	-	4 May 1931			
John Kotelawala	Elected	Kurunegala			13 June 1931			
Arunachalam Mahadeva	Elected	Jaffna			9 July 1934	1935		
A. H. Macan Markar	Elected	Batticaloa South			1931		Minister of Communications and Works (1931–35).	
Adeline Molamure	Elected	Ruwanwella			14 November 1931			
A. F. Molamure	Elected	Dedigama			1931	1934	Speaker (1931–34).	
S. Natesan	Elected	Kankesanthurai			4 May 1934	1935		
F. A. Obeysekera	Elected	Avissawella	7,424		1931		Deputy Speaker and Chairman of Committees (1931–34). Speaker (1934–35).	
T. B. Panabokke	Elected	Gampola			1931		Minister of Health (1931–35).	
I. X. Pereira	Appointed	Indian Tamils	-	-	26 June 1931			
E. W. Perera	Elected	Horana			1931			
G. K. W. Perera	Elected	Matara						
G. G. Ponnambalam	Elected	Point Pedro			1934	1935		
G. C. Rambukpotha	Elected	Bibile	-	-	1931			
A. E. Rajapakse	Elected	Negombo						
Abeyratne Ratnayaka	Elected	Dumbara						
Cudah Ratwatte	Elected	Balangoda			1931	1 August 1933	Resigned due to ill-health. Succeeded by T. G. Jayewardene.	
M. K. Saldin	Appointed	Malays	-	-	26 June 1931	1935		
Naysum Saravanamuttu	Elected	Colombo North			1931		Succeeds Ratnasothy Saravanamuttu.	
Ratnasothy Saravanamuttu	Elected	Colombo North			1931	1931	Unseated. Succeeded by Naysum Saravanamuttu.	
Stewart Schneider	Appointed	Burghers	-	-	26 June 1931			
V. R. S. Schokman	Appointed	Burghers			26 June 1931			
M. A. Seemanpillai	Elected	Mannar-Mullaitivu			1931			
Nevins Selvadurai	Elected	Kayts			1934	1935		
D. S. Senanayake	Elected	Minuwangoda	-	-	1931		Minister of Agriculture and Lands (1931–35).	
G. K. Stewart	Appointed							
D. C. Stewart-Smith	Appointed				6 November 1934			
Thomas Lister Villiers	Appointed				1932			
M. M. Subramaniam	Elected	Trincomalee-Batticaloa			1931	1935	Deputy Chairman of Committees (1931–35).	
Peri Sundaram	Elected	Hatton	-	-	1931		Minister of Labour, Industry and Commerce (1931–35).	
R. S. Tennekoon	Elected	Katugampola			1931	1935		
Evelyn Charles Villiers	Appointed	European			8 January 1935			
S. P. Vythilingam	Elected	Talawakele			1931			
David Wanigasekera	Elected	Weligama						
S. A. Wickremasinghe	Elected	Morawaka			1931			
V. S. de S. Wikramanayake	Elected	Hambantota	15,384		1931			
Edwin Wijeyeratne	Elected	Kegalle			1931	1935		
D. J. Wimalasurendra	Elected	Ratnapura			1931			
