= List of parliamentary elections in Sri Lanka =

Parliamentary elections have been held in Sri Lanka since the first in 1947, under three different constitutions: the Soulbury Constitution, the 1972 Constitution, and the currently enforced 1978 Constitution. Sixteen parliamentary elections have been held up to and including the 2020 election. The seventeenth is scheduled for 14 November 2024.

The current Parliament of Sri Lanka has 225 members elected for a five-year term. 196 members are elected from 22 multi-seat constituencies through an open list proportional representation with a 5% electoral threshold; voters can rank up to three candidates on the party list they vote for. The other 29 seats are elected from a national list, with list members appointed by party secretaries and seats allocated according to the island-wide proportional vote the party obtains.

Every proclamation dissolving parliament must be published in The Sri Lanka Gazette and must specify the nomination period and the date of the election. The first meeting of the new parliament must occur within three months of the previous parliament's dissolution.

== History ==
In 1833 the Colebrooke-Cameron Commission created the Legislative Council of Ceylon, the first step in representative government in British Ceylon. Initially this council consisted of 16 members which included the British Governor, the 5 appointed members of the Executive Council of Ceylon, 4 other government officials, and 6 appointed unofficial members. In 1889 the number of appointed unofficial members was increased to 8.

== Legislative Council elections: 1911–1924 ==
Election year	Legislative Council	Total seats	Description
1911 (Note: McCallum Reforms of 1910)	1st	21	11 official and 10 non-official members. Of the non-official members, 6 were appointed by the governor and the remaining 4 were elected.
1917	2nd	21	11 official and 10 non-official members. Of the non-official members, 6 were appointed by the governor and the remaining 4 were elected.
1921 (Note: First Manning Reforms of 1920)	3rd	37	14 official and 23 unofficial members. Of the non-official members, 4 were appointed by the governor and the remaining 19 were elected.
1924 (Note: Second Manning Reforms of 1923)	4th	49	12 official and 37 unofficial members. Of the non-official members, 8 were appointed by the governor and the remaining 29 were elected.

== State Council elections: 1931–1936 ==
=== Duration ===
Dates of nomination, election, dissolution and duration of State Councils
State Council	Date of				Duration
State Council	Nomination	Election	First meeting	Dissolved	Duration
1st	4 May 1931	13–20 June 1931 (Note: 13 and 15–20 June 1931)	6 July 1931	7 December 1935	4 years, 5 months and 1 day
2nd	15 January 1936	22 February – 7 March 1936 (Note: 22, 24–29 February, 2–3, 5, and 7 March 1936)	16 March 1936	4 July 1947	11 years, 3 months and 18 days

=== Elections ===
Election year	State Council	Total seats	Description
1931	1st	58	The State Council of Ceylon was the unicameral legislature of Ceylon (now Sri Lanka), established in 1931 by the Donoughmore Constitution. It introduced universal adult franchise to the colony for the first time, replacing the Legislative Council of Ceylon, the original legislative body.
1936	2nd	58	The State Council of Ceylon was the unicameral legislature of Ceylon (now Sri Lanka), established in 1931 by the Donoughmore Constitution. It introduced universal adult franchise to the colony for the first time, replacing the Legislative Council of Ceylon, the original legislative body.

== Parliamentary elections: 1947–2024 ==
=== Duration ===
Dates of nomination, election, dissolution and duration of Parliaments
Parliament	Date of				Duration
Parliament	Nomination	Election	First meeting	Dissolved	Duration
1st	26 July 1947	23 August – 20 September 1947 (Note: 23, 25–30 August, 1, 4, 6, 8–11, 13, 15–18 and 20 September 1947)	14 October 1947	8 April 1952	4 years, 177 days
2nd	28 April 1952	24–30 May 1952 (Note: 24, 26, 28 and 30 May 1952)	9 June 1952	18 February 1956	3 years, 254 days
3rd	8 March 1956	5–10 April 1956 (Note: 5, 7, and 10 April 1956)	19 April 1956	5 December 1959	3 years, 230 days
4th	4 January 1960	19 March 1960	30 March 1960	23 April 1960	24 days
5th	20 May 1960	20 July 1960	5 August 1960	17 December 1964	4 years, 134 days
6th	11 January 1965	22 March 1965	5 April 1965	25 March 1970	4 years, 354 days
7th	23 April 1970	27 May 1970	7 June 1970	—	1 year, 350 days
With the promulgation of the 1972 Constitution on 22 May 1972, the 1st National State Assembly superseded the 7th Parliament of Ceylon.
1st	—	—	22 May 1972	18 May 1977	4 years, 361 days
2nd	6 June 1977	21 July 1977	4 August 1977	—	1 year, 34 days
With the promulgation of the 1978 Constitution on 7 September 1978, the 8th Parliament of Sri Lanka (1st Parliament of the Democratic Socialist Republic of Sri Lanka) superseded the 2nd National State Assembly.
The 1982 referendum on extending the parliamentary term by six years was held in Sri Lanka on 22 December 1982. Through the Fourth Amendment to the Constitution, the term of the 8th Parliament was extended until 4 August 1989.
8th	—	—	7 September 1978	20 December 1988	10 years, 104 days
9th	6 January 1989	15 February 1989	9 March 1989	24 June 1994	5 years, 107 days
10th	11 July 1994	16 August 1994	25 August 1994	18 August 2000	5 years, 359 days
11th	28 August – 4 September 2000	10 October 2000	18 October 2000	10 October 2001	357 days
12th	20–27 October 2001	5 December 2001	19 December 2001	7 February 2004	2 years, 50 days
13th	17–24 February 2004	2 April 2004	22 April 2004	9 February 2010	5 years, 293 days
14th	19–26 February 2010	8 and 20 April 2010	22 April 2010	26 June 2015	5 years, 65 days
15th	6–13 July 2015	17 August 2015	1 September 2015	2 March 2020	4 years, 183 days
16th	12–19 March 2020	5 August 2020	20 August 2020	24 September 2024	4 years, 35 days
17th	4–11 October 2024	14 November 2024	21 November 2024	Incumbent	248 days

=== Elections ===
Elections, seats and Prime Ministers
Election	Parliament	Total seats	Turnout	Largest party	Seats won	Seat majority	Seat percentage	Prime Minister(s)	Ref.
1947	1st	95	55.81%	United National Party	42	-6	44.21%	D. S. Senanayake (1947–1952) (Note: Died in office.); Dudley Senanayake (1952)	
1952	2nd	95	70.7%	United National Party	54	+6	56.84%	Dudley Senanayake (1952–1953) (Note: Resigned.); Sir John Kotelawala (1953–1956)	
1956	3rd	95	69.04%	Mahajana Eksath Peramuna	51	+3	53.68%	S. W. R. D. Bandaranaike (1956–1959); Wijeyananda Dahanayake (1959–1960)	
1960 (March)	4th	151	77.6%	United National Party	50	-26	33.11%	Dudley Senanayake	
1960 (July)	5th	151	75.9%	Sri Lanka Freedom Party	75	-1	49.67%	Sirimavo Bandaranaike	
1965	6th	151	81.13%	United National Party	66	-10	43.71%	Dudley Senanayake	
1970	7th	151	85.2%	Sri Lanka Freedom Party	91	+15	60.26%	Sirimavo Bandaranaike	
1977 (Note: The election was delayed until 1977 using the 1972 Constitution, instead of holding it by 1975 as required under the old Soulbury Constitution.)	8th	168	86.7%	United National Party	140	+55	83.33%	J. R. Jayewardene (1977–1978) (Note: Appointed as the 1st Executive President of Sri Lanka through a constitutional amendment on 4 February 1978.); Ranasinghe Premadasa (1978–1989) (Note: Elected as president on 19 December 1988 and was sworn in on 2 January 1989.)	
1989 (Note: The 1989 parliamentary election was the first since 1977, as the election due by 1983 had been cancelled by the 1982 referendum.)	9th	225	63.6%	United National Party	125	+12	55.56%	Dingiri Banda Wijetunga (1989–1993) (Note: Elected unanimously by the parliament as president to complete the remainder of Ranasinghe Premadasa's term and was sworn in on 7 May 1993.); Ranil Wickremesinghe (1993–1994)	
1994	10th	225	76.24%	People's Alliance	105	-8	46.67%	Chandrika Kumaratunga (1994) (Note: Elected as president on 9 November 1994 and was sworn in on 12 November 1994.); Sirimavo Bandaranaike (1994–2000); Ratnasiri Wickremanayake (2000)	
2000	11th	225	75.63%	People's Alliance	107	-6	47.56%	Ratnasiri Wickremanayake	
2001	12th	225	76.03%	United National Front	96	-17	42.67%	Ranil Wickremesinghe	
2004	13th	225	75.96%	United People's Freedom Alliance	105	-8	46.67%	Mahinda Rajapaksa (2004–2005) (Note: Elected as president on 17 November 2005 and was sworn in on 19 November 2005.); Ratnasiri Wickremanayake (2005–2010)	
2010	14th	225	61.26%	United People's Freedom Alliance	144	+31	64%	D. M. Jayaratne (2010–2015); Ranil Wickremesinghe (2015) (Note: Appointed as prime minister by President Maithripala Sirisena on 9 January 2015 following his victory in the 2015 presidential election.)	
2015	15th	225	77.66%	United National Front	106	-7	47.11%	Ranil Wickremesinghe (2015–2018) (Note: Dismissed from office by President Maithripala Sirisena on 26 October 2018.); Mahinda Rajapaksa (2018) (Note: Appointed by President Maithripala Sirisena as prime minister on 26 October 2018. After failing to secure a vote of majority support in the House, Rajapaksa's duties were suspended by the Supreme Court of Sri Lanka. Subsequently resigned from office on 15 December 2018.); Ranil Wickremesinghe (2018–2019) (Note: Restored as prime minister after the 2018 Sri Lankan constitutional crisis on 16 December 2018.); Mahinda Rajapaksa (2019–2020) (Note: Appointed as prime minister by President Gotabaya Rajapaksa on 21 November 2019 following his victory in the 2019 presidential election.)	
2020	16th	225	75.89%	Sri Lanka People's Freedom Alliance	145	+32	64.44%	Mahinda Rajapaksa (2020–2022); Ranil Wickremesinghe (2022) (Note: Appointed as prime minister by President Gotabaya Rajapaksa on 12 May 2022.) (Note: Elected by the parliament as president on 20 July 2022 and was sworn in on 21 July 2022.); Dinesh Gunawardena (2022–2024) (Note: Appointed as prime minister by President Ranil Wickremesinghe on 22 July 2022.); Harini Amarasuriya (2024) (Note: Appointed as prime minister by President Anura Kumara Dissanayake on 24 September 2024 following his victory in the 2024 presidential election.)	
2024	17th	225	68.93%	National People's Power	159	+46	70.67%	Harini Amarasuriya (2024–present)	
