= Susantha de Fonseka =

Ceylonese statesman and diplomat (1900–1963)

The Honourable Sir Susantha de Fonseka KBE

Personal details
- Born: 1900 Panadura, British Ceylon
- Died: 1963 (aged 62–63) Colombo, Dominion of Ceylon
- Relations: Arthur de Silva, E. R. de Fonseka, Tissa Abeysekara
- Education: Downing College, Cambridge, Royal College, Colombo, St. John's College Panadura
- Occupation: Politician, Diplomat
- Profession: Barrister

Military service
- Allegiance: British Ceylon
- Branch/service: Ceylon Naval Volunteer Force
- Years of service: 1938–1941
- Rank: Paymaster Lieutenant

Sir Susantha de Fonseka KBE (25 April 1900 – 1 January 1963) was a Ceylonese statesman and diplomat. He was the Deputy Speaker of the State Council of Ceylon and following Ceylon's independence from Britain his first Ambassador to Burma and first Ambassador to Japan. De Fonseka took an active part in the country's struggle for universal suffrage and self-determination.

== Early life and education ==
Born Kalutaravedage Deepal Susantha de Fonseka, his father was Dr C. P. De Fonseka and his mother was Muthutantrige Leonora Fernando Sri Chandrasekara, a daughter of Muthuthanthrige Simon Fernando Sri Chandrasekera (1829–1908) of Sirinivasa. He was raised by his maternal uncle W Arthur de Silva who was a member of the Legislative Council of Ceylon and the Minister of Health from 1936 to 1942 in the second State Council of Ceylon.

De Fonseka was educated at St. John's College Panadura, Royal College, Colombo, and went on to study at Downing College, Cambridge, where he gained his MA. After leaving Cambridge, he entered the Inns of Court and qualified as a barrister. Upon his return to Ceylon, he became the principal of Sri Sumangala College, Panadura, after which he went on to become the editor of The Morning Leader.

== Political career ==
De Fonseka contested the 1931 Ceylonese State Council election and was elected to the State Council from Panadura in June 1931 and was re-elected in the 1936 Ceylonese State Council election from Panadura. During the second State Council, when Sir Vaitilingam Duraiswamy was elected speaker, de Fonseka contested the post of Deputy Speaker and won against Major E. A. Nugawela, who later became a Minister in the first Cabinet of D. S. Senanayake.

With the formation of the Ceylon Naval Volunteer Force on 1 January 1938, de Fonseka volunteered and was commissioned as one of two Paymaster Sub Lieutenants along with Noel Gratiaen on 4 March 1938, becoming the first Ceylonese to become naval officers. With the outbreak of World War 2, he was mobilized in September 1939 and was attached to Naval Headquarters in Kochchikade. As a member of the State Council and its deputy speaker, Paymaster Lieutenant de Fonseka was allowed to attend the State Council which he did in uniform. With the British Government purchasing rubber produced in Ceylon at a fixed price below market rates, De Fonseka made a strong speech condemning this move by British Government in the State Council in uniform. This was brought to the attention of Admiral Sir Geoffrey Layton, Commander-in-Chief, Ceylon who saw it as an act of disloyalty by a naval officer, specially since the speech was made while in uniform. Layton had De Fonseka's commission withdrawn. De Fonseka claimed this action a breach of parliamentary privileges', yet the decision was not reversed.

De Fonseka took an active part in the country's struggle for universal suffrage and self-determination. First it was with the Donoughmore Commission and later with the Soulbury commissioners (1943–1945). Susantha de Fonseka as the State Council member for Panadura, moved a motion in the State Council, by November 1944, to the effect that the Ministers "be directed to introduce immediately a Bill conferring on this country a constitution of the recognized dominion type for Free Lanka". He lost his seat contesting from the United National Party in the 1947 general election to Henry Peiris, the candidate from the Lanka Sama Samaja Party, marking the end of his political career.

== Diplomatic career ==
In 1949, Susantha de Fonseka was appointed as Ceylon's first High Commissioner to Burma. He was a very popular figure in Rangoon, often making speeches in Burmese. Ambassador de Fonseka built up such close contacts with the Burmese leadership that he was associated with Prime Minister U Na when Karen guerrillas surrendered. Thereafter D. S. Senanayake sent him on an important diplomatic assignment to Peking in 1952. It was this assignment which laid the foundation for the Rubber-Rice Pact between Ceylon and China. He was knighted as a Knight Commander of The Most Excellent Order of the British Empire on 12 April 1954 in the 1954 Birthday Honours.

Later, in 1956, Fonseka became Ceylon's first Ambassador in Japan. While there, he together with the Professor G P Malalasekera, organized a conference of the World Fellowship' of Buddhists. He propagated Theravada Buddhism and built a dagoba in Japan.

== Personal life ==
Sir Susantha de Fonseka, was a cousin of Justice E.R. de Fonseka and the uncle and godfather to popular cinema icon Tissa Abeysekara, whose father was also Susantha's cousin. B. F. Perera was his brother-in-law, married to his sister Phoebe Elaine de Fonseka.

== Legacy ==
Sir Susantha de Fonseka, the Father of the Free Lanka Bill is remembered as one Sri Lanka's pioneering diplomats and for promoting constitutional reforms on the long walk to independence. In his memory the Sir Susantha De Fonseka memorial Prize for Arts is awarded annually at Royal College, Colombo.

== See also ==
- Sri Lankan Non Career Diplomats

== External links & References ==
- DPL who won all hearts, Jinadasa Fernando Gunasekera - Ceylon Daily News, 24 March 1988.
- Arise, Sir Susantha
