= Second Board of Ministers of Ceylon =

Second Board of Ministers
- 23rd Cabinet of British Ceylon

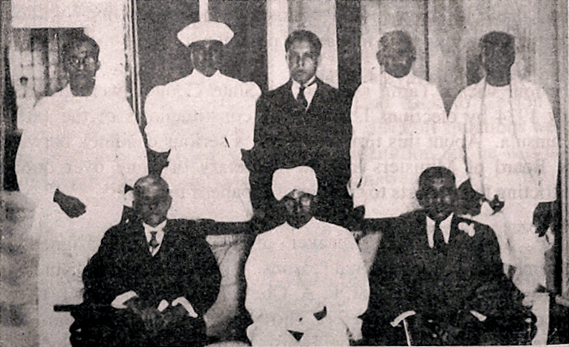
- Ministers of the Second State Council of Ceylon with the Speaker in 1936
- Date formed: March 1936
- Date dissolved: June 1947

People and organisations
- Head of state: Edward VIII; George VI
- Head of government: Guy Stanley Wodeman (1940–42); Robert Drayton
- Deputy head of government: Don Baron Jayatilaka (1936–42); D. S. Senanayake (1942–47)
- Ministers removed: 5
- Total no. of members: 15

History
- Election: 1936
- Outgoing election: 1947
- Legislature term: 2nd
- Predecessor: First Board of Ministers
- Successor: D. S. Senanayake cabinet

The Second Board of Ministers was the executive body opposite the State Council of Ceylon between 1936 and 1947. It was formed in March 1936 after the state council election and it ended in June 1947 with dissolution of the 2nd State Council. The Board of Ministers consisted of ten members, three ex-officio British officials (Chief Secretary, Financial Secretary and Legal Secretary) and the chairmen of the State Council's seven executive committees. The Chief Secretary was the chairman of the Board of Ministers whilst the Leader of the State Council was its vice-chairman.

== Members ==
Minister	Office	Took office	Left office
Guy Stanley Wodeman	Chief Secretary	1940	1942
Robert Drayton	Chief Secretary	1942	1947
Robert Drayton	Legal Secretary	1940	1942
Barclay Nihill	Legal Secretary	1942	1946
H. J. Huxham	Financial Secretary		
Oliver Goonetilleke	Financial Secretary	1945	
S. W. R. D. Bandaranaike	Minister of Local Administration	1936	1947
Claude Corea	Minister of Labour, Industry & Commerce	1936	1947
W. A. de Silva	Minister of Health	1936	1947
Don Baron Jayatilaka	Minister of Home Affairs	1936	1942
C. W. W. Kannangara	Minister of Education	1936	1947
John Kotelawala	Minister of Communications & Works	1936	1947
Arunachalam Mahadeva	Minister of Home Affairs	1942	1947
D. S. Senanayake	Minister of Agriculture & Lands	1936	1946
Dudley Senanayake	Minister of Agriculture & Lands	1946	1947
