= G. K. W. Perera =

Ceylonese lawyer, educator, politician and diplomat

Galappatti Kankanange William Perera (19 October 1884 - July 1956) was a Ceylonese lawyer, educator, politician and diplomat.

== Early life ==
Galappatti Kankanange William Perera was born on 19 October 1884 in Galle, Ceylon, the son of Carolis Perera and Merennege née Ensohamy.

Perera received his education at Ananda College. In 1904 he won the national University Scholarship, which allowed him to study at Christ's College, Cambridge, where he obtained a Bachelor of Arts and Law.

== Career ==
At the fourth Legislative Council election held on 27 September 1924 he contested the seat for Southern Province (Eastern Division) against a local Tangalle barrister, V. S. de S. Wikramanayake. Whilst Perera won the initial vote he demanded a recount as he believed he had secured a greater majority of votes only to lose to Wikramanayake by 17 votes.

Perera served as the principal of Nalanda College, Colombo between 1926 and 1927.

At the first State Council election in 1931, Perera was elected as the representative for Hambantota. In March 1932 Perera moved a motion in the State Council calling for the use of Sinhalese and Tamil in the judicial and civil administration. It failed however to get the necessary support. In 1934, he moved that Sinhala and Tamil be used in the administration and law courts, whilst the motion was passed very little was done to implement it. In December 1934, following the resignation of Alexander Francis Molamure, the Speaker of the State Council, Forester Augustus Obeysekera was elected to the position, defeating Perera by 28 votes to 27.

In 1938, Perera served as the first Trade Commissioner of Ceylon in England, which at the time was the highest appointment available to represent the country abroad.

In 1942 he contested the by-election for the seat of Moratuwa on the 2nd State Council of Ceylon, following the resignation of the sitting member, W. A. de Silva. He was unsuccessful, losing to Thomas Amarasuriya.

At the 1st parliamentary election, held between 23 August 1947 and 20 September 1947, he ran as an Independent for the seat of Hambantota. Perera received 1,301 votes (7.0% of the total vote) and was defeated by the Communist Party of Ceylon candidate, Lakshman Rajapaksa, who received 8,740 votes (47% of the total vote).

== Personal life ==
He married Joslin Catherine née Fernando (1890-1962) and they had five children - Nina (Wijesuriya), Kenneth (died in Infancy), Elise (Fernando), Dr Celia (died soon after qualifying) and Cecil Marcel (C.M. - the first Director of Dept of Highways, Ceylon).

Perera died in Colombo in July 1956, at the age of 71.
