= Godfrey Edward Madawala =

Ceylonese politician

Godfrey Edward Madawala (23 June 1878 – September 1932) was a Ceylonese lawyer and politician. He was a member of the Legislative Council of Ceylon and the State Council of Ceylon.

His father was Madawala Basnayaka Nilame, who was a notary and landowner; his mother was Ranmenike from Walgama. Madawala was educated at S. Thomas' College and Trinity College Kandy, where he completed his arts examination in 1897, then was admitted as a proctor of the district court of Kurunegala in 1901. Having established his legal practice in Kurunegala, he served as a crown proctor and a unofficial magistrate. He was large landowner, owning the Mahakeliya coconut estate, and hundreds of acres of paddyland in the Kurunegala District. Later he donated his residence, Godfrey Villa to the Maliyadeva College.

Madawala was elected to the Legislative Council representing the North Western Province- Eastern Division, Narammala in the 1921 Ceylonese Legislative Council election and was re-elected in the 1924 Ceylonese Legislative Council election. He was thereafter elected to the State Council in the 1931 Ceylonese State Council election from North Western Province from the Ceylon Labour Party. He died in office in September 1932 and was succeeded by W. H. de S. Jayasundara.

He married Frances Alexandra Elsie, second daughter of C. E. Tennakoon, Rate Mahaththaya of Wanni Hath Paththu. They had three children, one son and two daughters.
