= S. P. Vythilingam =

Ceylonese politician (1903-?)

Hon. S. P. Vythilingam

Member of Parliament for Appointed member
- In office 1952–1956

State Council of Ceylon
- In office 1931–1946

Personal details
- Born: Sidambarampillai P. Vythilingam; 2 April 1903
- Party: Independent
- Occupation: Tea planter, politician

Sidambarampillai P. Vythilingam (2 April 1903 - ?) was a Ceylonese politician.

In 1931 Vythilingam was elected to the 1st State Council of Ceylon, representing Talawakelle.

At the 1936 State Council elections Vythilingam was re-elected, as the representative for Talawakelle, unopposed to the 2nd State Council of Ceylon.

In 1952 Vythilingam was appointed, by Governor-General Viscount Soulbury on the recommendation of Prime Minister Dudley Senanayake, to the second parliament to represent the Ceylonese Indians. Vythilingam was a long-standing hill country Tamil loyalist of the United National Party. His appointment was strongly opposed by the Ceylon Indian Congress who believed that the Congress was more representative of the Indian community in Ceylon than a single individual.
