= A. Fellowes-Gordon =

Henry 'Harry' Abdy Fellowes-Gordon (10 December 1883 – 18 May 1940) was a British tea planter and politician in Colonial Ceylon.

Fellowes-Gordon was born in Cupar, Fife, Scotland, the eldest son of Henry 'Harry' Gordon Gordon-Fellowes (1858–1925), the fifteenth Laird of Knockespock, and Millicent Amelia Charlotte née Blood (1862–1931). He received his education at Wellington College, Berkshire.

Fellowes-Gordon fought in the South African War (1901–1902), in the Royal Leicestershire Regiment. He subsequently served with the Leicestershire Regiment in World War I attaining the rank of a Lieutenant.

In 1912, Fellowes-Gordon purchased a tea plantation, Roehampton Estate, in Haputale, which he managed for twenty years.

Upon his father's death in 1925, Fellowes-Gordon inherited his father's estate in Aberdeenshire.

On 13 June 1931, he was elected to the 1st State Council of Ceylon representing Bandarawela. One of only two British elected to the State Council, the other being H. R. Freeman, who represented Anuradhapura. Fellowes-Gordon polled 9,029 votes, defeating the Sinhalese candidate, H. J. Pinto, by 3,299 votes due to his influence with the majority of Tamil Indian voters. He was appointed to the Executive Committee on Agriculture and Lands.

Fellowes-Gordon failed in his bid to get re-elected at the next State Council election in 1936, at which Daniel Dias Gunasekera, a Ceylonese businessman, won the seat of Bandarawela. He died in Ceylon in 1940.
