= George Alfred Henry Wille =

George Alfred Henry Wille (31 March 1871 – 31 August 1951) was a Ceylonese proctor, notary public, journalist and politician.

Willie was born on 31 March 1871, the second son of John Francis Wille (born 1845) and Maria Charlotte née Kidd (1847–1928). He was educated at Royal College, Colombo.

Wille was a partner at the legal firm of De Vos and Gratiaen.

On 30 September 1896, he married Rosaline Anne née Brohier (born 1872) in Wolvendaal Church, Colombo. They had six children: Frances Elaine (1898–1935); Evill Merle (born 1899); Irene Gladys (born 1900); George Vernon Frank (born 1902); George Eustace Neil (born 1906); and George Alfred Herbert (born 1910).

He was the only Burgher community leader who was an active participant of the Ceylon National Congress. He resigned from the Congress, following the retirement of Allen Drieberg, the Burger member of the Legislative Council of Ceylon, to take Drieberg's position on the Legislative Council, serving from 27 September 1924 to 1931. When the 1st State Council of Ceylon was constituted in 1931, Wille was nominated as the Burgher member. He was however prevented from taking up the office due to professional problems at his legal firm, De Vos and Gratiaen. However, when the Burgher deputation to the Donoughmore Commission was selected, Wille was an undisputed representative.

On 12 March 1936, he was appointed as a member of the 2nd State Council of Ceylon, serving until the council's dissolution on 4 July 1947.

He died on 31 August 1951 at a nursing home in Colombo at the age of 80.
