= C. W. W. Kannangara =

Sri Lankan politician and lawyer

Hon. Dr. C. W. W. Kannangara
- සී. ඩබ්ලිව්. ඩබ්ලිව්. කන්නන්ගර
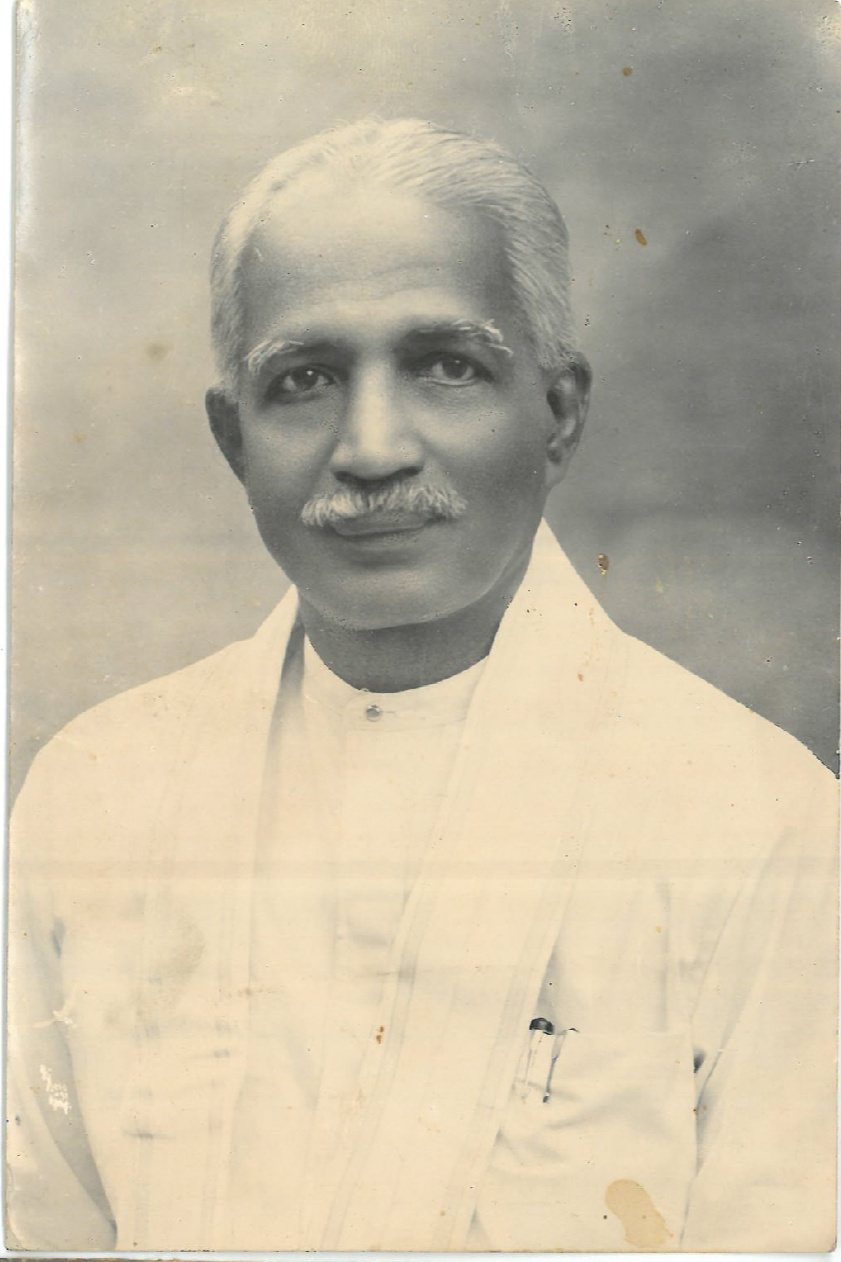
- Dr. C. W. W. Kannangara

Minister of Education
- In office 1931–1947
- Preceded by: Position established
- Succeeded by: E. A. Nugawela

Minister of Housing and Local Government
- In office 1952–1956
- Prime Minister: Dudley Senanayake; John Kotelawala
- Preceded by: Dudley Senanayake
- Succeeded by: Jayaweera Kuruppu

Chief Government Whip
- In office 1952–1956
- Prime Minister: Dudley Senanayake; John Kotelawala
- Preceded by: A. E. Goonesinghe
- Succeeded by: W. J. C. Moonesinghe

President of Ceylon National Congress
- In office 1931–19??

Member of the Ceylon Parliament for Agalawatte
- In office 1952–1956
- Preceded by: S. A. Silva
- Succeeded by: Anil Moonesinghe

Member of the State Council of Ceylon for Galle
- In office 1931–1935
- Preceded by: Constituency created
- Succeeded by: H. W. Amarasuriya

Member of the State Council of Ceylon for Matugama
- In office 1936–1947
- Preceded by: D. D. Athulathmudali
- Succeeded by: Constituency abolished

Personal details
- Born: Christopher William Wijekoon Kannangara; 13 October 1884 Wewala, Hikkaduwa
- Died: 23 September 1969 (aged 84) Colombo General Hospital, Colombo, Sri Lanka
- Party: Ceylon National Congress; United National Party
- Spouse: Edith née Weerasooria
- Children: Dr. Chithraranjan Swarajweera Wijekoon Kannangara, Kusumawathi Wijekoon Senevirathne
- Parents: John Daniel Wijekoon Kannangara (father); Emily Wijesinghe (mother)
- Education: Wesleyan Missionary School Randombe, Ambalangoda, Richmond College, Galle, Ceylon Law College
- Occupation: Politician
- Profession: Lawyer / Proctor

Dr. Cristopher William Wijekoon Kannangara (Sinhala ආචාර්ය ක්‍රිස්ටෝෆර් විලියම් විජේකෝන් කන්නන්ගර; 18 October 1894 – 23 September 1969) was a Sri Lankan Lawyer and a politician. He rose up the ranks of Sri Lanka's movement for independence in the early part of the 20th century. As a lawyer he defended the detainees that were imprisoned during the Riots of 1915, many of whom were the emerging leaders of the independence movement. In 1931, he became the President of Ceylon National Congress, the forerunner to the United National Party. Later, he became the first Minister of Education in the State Council of Ceylon, and was instrumental in introducing extensive reforms to the country's education system that opened up education to children from all levels of society.

Born in the Southern coastal town of Hikkaduwa, his academic progress at the free Wesleyan school enabled him to win a Foundation Scholarship to Richmond College, Galle, a prestigious secondary school at the time managed by the Methodist church. After leaving school, he worked as a teacher in Mathematics at Wesley College, Colombo and Prince of Wales' College, Moratuwa. He excelled as a lawyer in the Southern Province, eventually getting elected in 1923 as its representative, first to the Legislative Council of Ceylon, and then to its successor the State Council.

Becoming Minister of Education in the State Council, Kannangara and the Committees of Education introduced extensive reforms to Sri Lanka's education system throughout the 1940s. He began a Central Colleges scheme, which established high quality secondary schools for the benefit of thousands of underprivileged students in the rural parts of the country. Kannangara was also the Chairman of the Committee that submitted the Free Education Bill for a vote in the State Council, though he was initially opposed to complete free education. Kannangara's significant achievements in areas of education have led him to being commonly referred to as the Father of Free Education in Sri Lanka.

== Early life ==
Christopher William Wijekoon Kannangara was born on 13 October 1884, at Wee Badu Walawwa (his maternal ancestral home) in the village of Wewala, off Hikkaduwa (වී බදු වලව්ව, වෑවල, හික්කඩුව) in the Southern Province of Ceylon. It has been inaccurately quoted that Kannangara was born in Randombe, (off Ambalangoda). He was the son of John Daniel Wijekoon Kannangara, the Deputy Fiscal in the Police Magistrate's Court in Balapitiya, and Emily Wijesinghe, daughter of Mudliyer Wijesinghe; he also had four siblings.

Emily passed away early in Kannangara's childhood, John Daniel would and have four more children with his second wife.

== Education ==
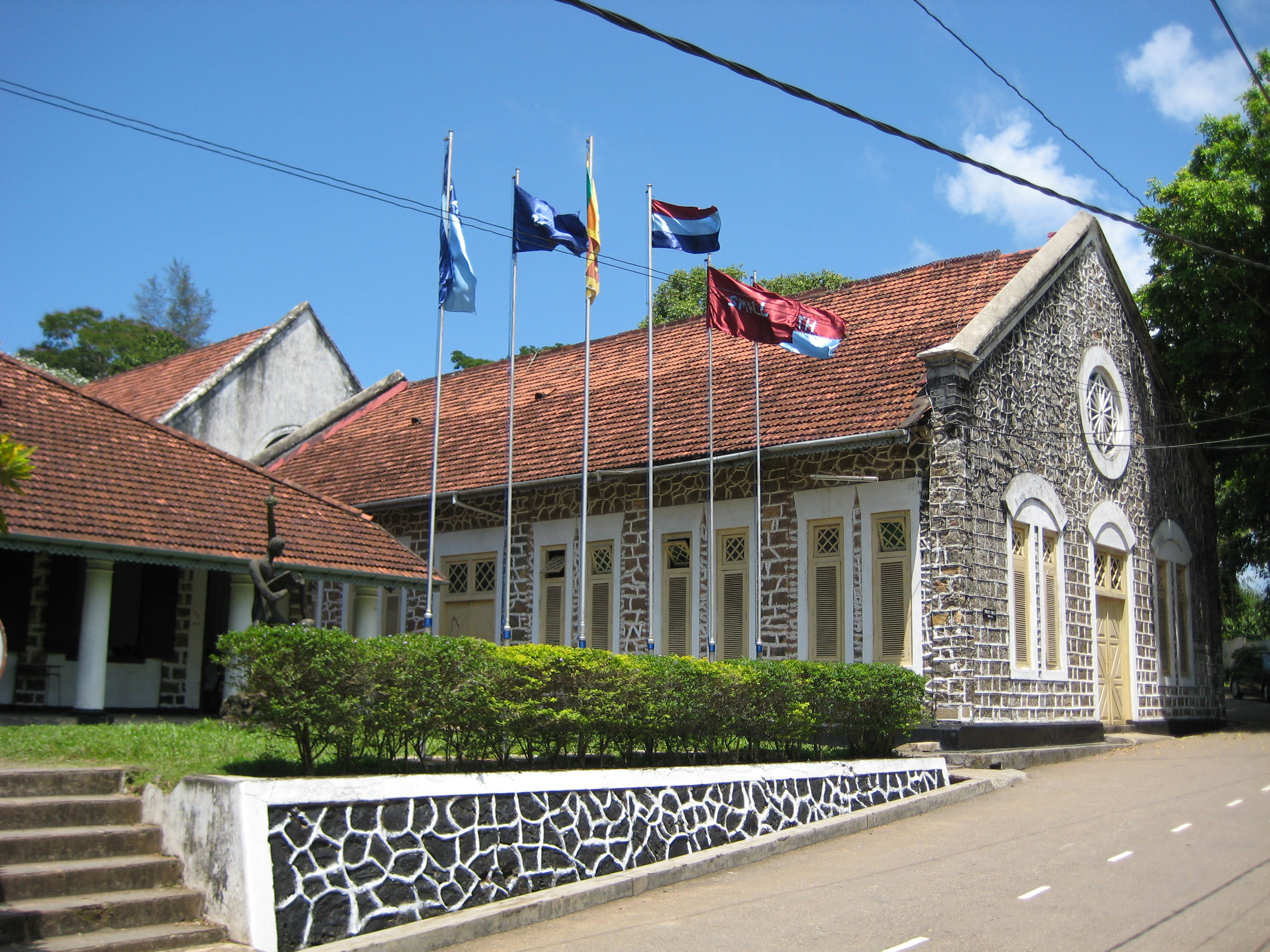
The young Kananga attended the well known Richmond College, in Galle, Sri Lanka.

Kannangara received his primary education at the free Wesleyan Missionary School, and his achievements were brought to the attention of the Rev. J.H. Darrel, Principal of Richmond College, Galle, who was visiting during a prize-giving ceremony. Having noticed that most of the prizes were won by Kananga, he is said to have remarked, "Son, you may have to hire a bullock cart to take home the books you collected at this prize giving." Darrel also gave Kannangara a chance to sit for a Richmond College Foundation scholarship exam. Excelling in Mathematics in the exam, he won the scholarship, receiving an award for free board and lodging at Richmond College. There he would receive education from an elite school of the time, far superior to that offered at his school.

Kannangara was regarded as an excellent all-round student at Richmond, leading the Ceylon and British Empire list in Mathematics at the Cambridge Senior Examination in 1903. He also captained Richmond College in first eleven cricket in 1903, and was a member of the school soccer team the same year, winning colours for his performances. He was also regarded as a fine debater and actor.

== Early career ==
After completing his schooling at Richmond College, he joined its teaching staff as a mathematics teacher and thereafter went on to teach mathematics at Prince of Wales' College, Moratuwa and at Wesley College, Colombo. While teaching, he studied Law at Ceylon Law College and passed the Proctor's Intermediate examination in July 1908 and the Proctor's Final examination in July 1910, thereby qualifying as a Proctor in 1910. That year he left Wesley College and came to Galle, where he started his legal practice in civil law.

An active member in Galle society, from 1911 to 1920 he served as the secretary of Richmond College Old Boys Union, committee member of the Galle Cricket Club and the Galle Gymkhana Club. He was known as a good billiard player. He also served as the honorary secretary of the Galle Reading Room, he was a member of the library committee and the Galle Poor relief Committee, Vice President of the Sinhalese Young Men's Association and General Secretary of the Temperance Union, Galle.

== Political career ==
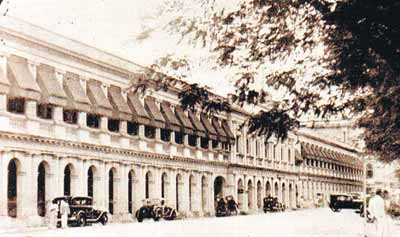
Kannangara was elected to the Legislative Council of Ceylon in 1923, thrusting him into the very heart of national politics. He was elected to the State Council in 1931 and again in 1936.

Kannangara joined Anagarika Dharmapala's historically significant temperance movement, and worked actively with its leaders, including Sir D.B. Jayatilleke, D.S. Senanayake, F.R. Senanayake and Arthur V. Dias. In 1911, elections were held for the first time to elect an Educated Ceylonese to the Legislative Council of Ceylon. The two primary contests were Ponnambalam Ramanathan and Marcus Fernando. Strongly supporting Ramanathan, Kannangara was elected Honorary Secretary of the committee supporting Ramanathan in the Southern Province. Ramanathan was elected to the Legislative Council over Fernando. He gained popularity for his work legal work in the defense of the leaders of the Sri Lankan independence movement and others who were persecuted by the colonial British administration during the period of martial law which following the Riots of 1915. In the following elections in 1917, Kannangara once again supported Ramanathan against J.S. Jayawardena. That year, Kannangara had formed the first political association in Galle, the Galle National Association. He thereafter joined the Ceylon National Congress.

== Legislative Council ==
His kinsman and Legislative Council member for the Southern Province O. C. Tillekeratne died on 13 April 1923 in a fatal train accident at the Wellawatte station. Kannangara stood for the vacant seat in a by-election that was held on 23 May 1923 and was elected to the Legislative Council with 1,969 votes; compared to his opponent David de Silva's 115 votes, he had a majority of 1,854. He would be reelected in 1924 with 4,177 votes, the other candidate Francis de Zoysa having gotten 2,310.

== State Council ==
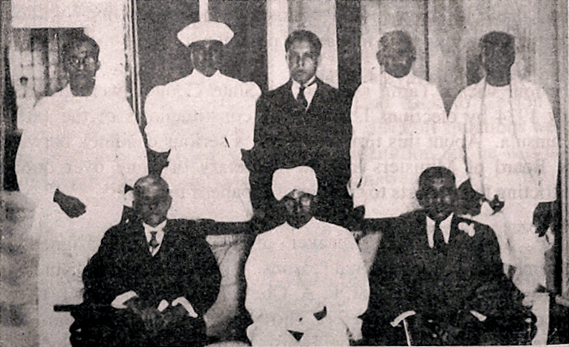
Hon.Kannangara (Standing far right) as a member of the Second State Council of Ceylon in 1936.

In 1931, he was elected President of the Ceylon National Congress. That same year, following the recommendations of the Donoughmore Commission, the State Council of Ceylon was established, succeeding the Legislative Council as the island's legislature. Kannangara was elected to the State Council, defeating S.H. Dahanayake.

For the first time, the State Council, which had its members elected via universal suffrage, compromised Executive Committees and Ministers. Kannangara was appointed as the first chairman of the Executive Committee of Education in the State Council and thus became the first Minister of Education of Ceylon in 1931. Apart from Kannangara, the first Executive Committee of Education consisted of H. W. Amarasuriya, W. T. B. Karaliadda, A. Ratnayaka, G. R. de Zoysa, G. E. Madawela and Dr. S. A. Wickramasinghe. He is also notable for being the first minister to wear the National costume in the State Council. He was re-elected in 1935, retaining his position as Minister of Education. He was also a member of the War Council during World War II.

=== Education reforms ===
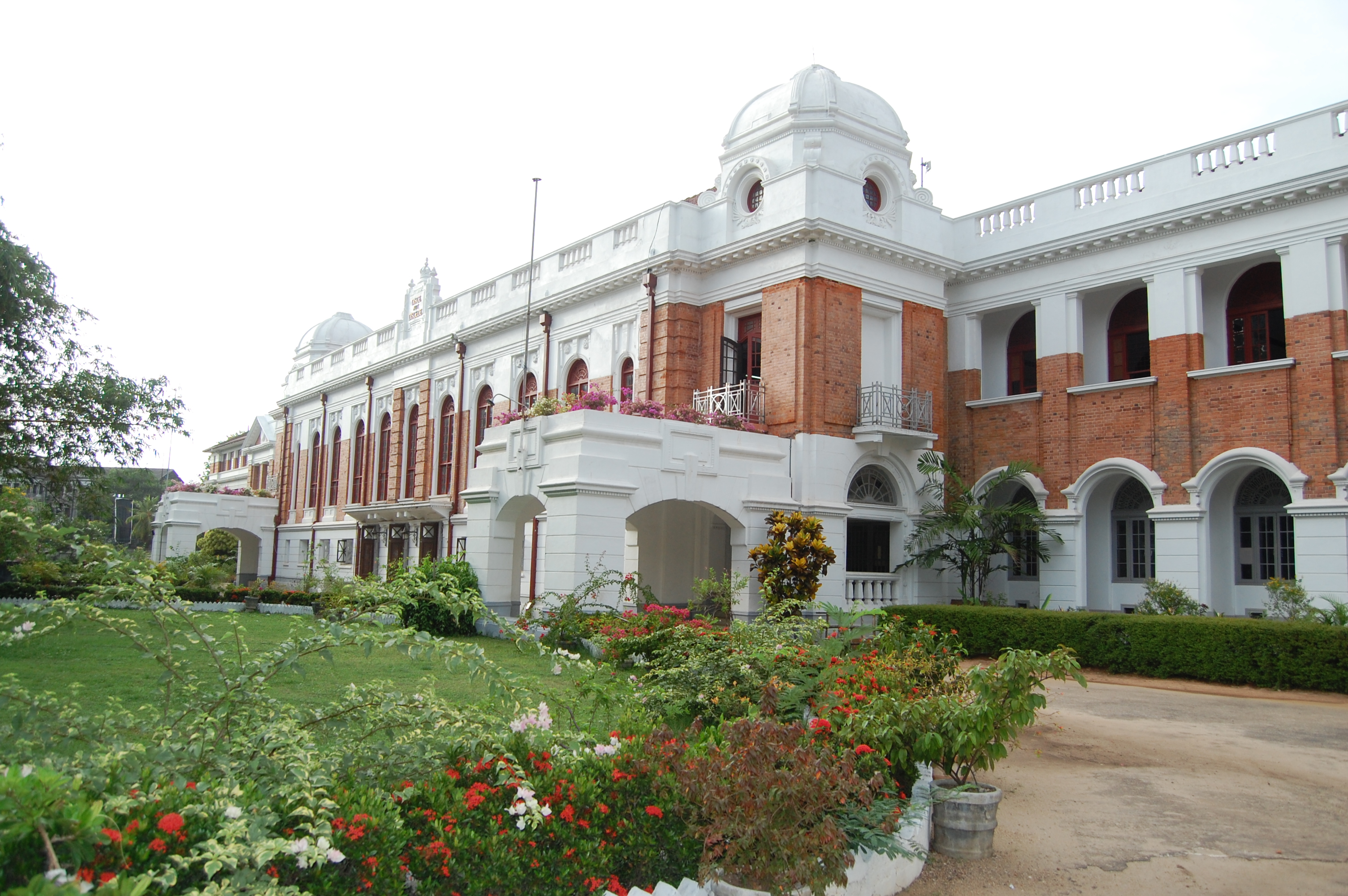
Kannangara proposed that central schools be modelled upon Royal College, Colombo, one of the leading schools in the country.

Exercising its powers to create new regulations, the Executive Committee of Education paved the way for the establishment of a new system of education in Sri Lanka. The new system was expected to ensure that education was provided with equal opportunities for all children in the country, irrespective of social class, economic condition, religion and ethnic origin. Although the education in vernacular schools had been free prior to the reforms (with government grants covering the cost of teaching and local philanthropists providing for buildings, equipment and books), it was not standardised. The final report of the Executive Committee of Education was published in 1943, with the inclusion of important recommendations initiated by A. Ratnayake, P. de S. Kularatne, S. Natesan and T. B. Jayah, that were initially opposed by Kannangara;

- Education should be free from the Kindergarten to University.
- The mother tongue should be used as the medium of instruction in the Primary Schools.
- English should be taught in all schools from standard III.
- A curriculum for the child which would develop its "head, heart and hands" should be introduced — in other words, the education of the emotions is as necessary as the education of intellect and practical ability for the well-being of the child.

Kannagara, as Minister of Education, was placed in charge of implementing the recommendations. Among the reforms introduced, which came into operation on 1 October 1945, were to make education free of charge for all students, to ensure that every student was provided with instruction in the religion of his/her parents, to protect teachers from exploitation by school managers by having their wages paid directly by the government, and to make adequate provisions for adult education in the country.

Kannagara established a series of central schools (Madhya Vidhyala), modelled on Royal College, Colombo, in locations outside major cities. These took high quality secondary education to the rural outstations of the country. His objective was to create a central school in every electorate in the country, and as such, while in 1941 there were three central schools in the country; by 1945 the number had increased to 35, and to 50 by 1950. In 1943, Kannangara also launched an annual scholarship program, which provided the opportunity for the 20 best performers of the scholarship exam to get free board and lodging in Central School hostels.

During his 16-year period as Minister of Education, he also upgraded ancient pirivenas, educational establishments for Buddhist monks and took steps to abolish the two tier school system where English was taught to privileged students and the vernacular language was taught to the rural masses. While he laid emphasis on teaching Swabasha (native languages) in schools, he also advised that students should learn English to compete in the modern world. Kannangara was a strong supporter for the establishment of the University of Ceylon, with the University Bill establishing it being passed by the State Council on 1 March 1942. In the first convocation of the University of Ceylon, Kannangara was conferred a LLD (Honoris Causa) in recognition of his services to education.

=== Opposition ===
Kannangara faced significant opposition to his move to establish free education in the country, especially from some sections of the socially and economically privileged groups that enjoyed significant advantages. Significantly, this included a number of C.W.W Kannangara's political colleagues, including D.S. Senanayake, the first Prime Minister of Sri Lanka. Kannangara spoke for six and a half hours to convince other members of the council to vote for the bill, and was supported in his efforts by H. W. Amarasuriya, Dudley Senanayake, J. R. Jayewardene, Sir Oliver Goonetilleke, Dr. N. M. Perera and others. There was also a public campaign launched by E. W. Adikaram, G.P. Malalasekera and L. H. Metthananda to support the bill, which was eventually passed by the State Council in July 1945.

== Post Independence ==
His achievements in the State Council in the field of Education did not however translate to popularity among the people of his electorate, and he lost his seat in parliament in the General Elections of 1947. He was defeated in the poll for the Matugama electorate by Wilmot A. Perera, the founder of the popular local school Sri Palee College. Kannangara was then appointed Ceylon's Consul General to Indonesia, a post in which he served from 1950 to 1952. He returned to politics again, and was elected to the Parliament of Ceylon from the Agalawatta electorate in the 1952 general elections, defeating S.A. Silva. He was appointed Minister of Housing and Local Government in the new cabinet of Dudley Senanayake and served as the Chief Government Whip. He was most possibly denied the position of Cabinet Minister of Education as some leading figures in the government did not wish to give him the opportunity to carry forward further reforms to the education system.

He was a strong supporter of the cause to spread Buddhism in the West then gaining increasing public support in Sri Lanka in the immediate post - independence period. At a Public Meeting held at Ananda College, Colombo on 30 May 1953 which was presided by Hon. C.W.W.Kannangara, then Minister of Local Government, to make public the findings of the survey carried out by Asoka Weeraratna (Founder and Hony. Secretary of the Lanka Dhammaduta Society - later known as the German Dharmaduta Society) on the current state of Buddhist activities in Germany and the prospects for a Buddhist Mission to Germany before the Buddha Jayanthi celebrations in 1956, Hon. C.W.W. Kannangara moved the following Motion: "This House is of the opinion that the public of Ceylon should fully support the efforts of the Lanka Dhammaduta Society for the establishment of the Sambuddhasasana in Germany and propagate Buddhism in Europe". The Hon. C.W.W.Kannangara further said that the Lanka Dhammaduta Society was going to serve one of the greatest causes of Buddhism launched after the Great Emperor Asoka of India. He therefore urged that all Buddhists should back the Society in every way in order to help it to establish the Buddhasasana firmly in Germany He showed his unstinting support for the cause of Buddhist missionary work in the West by attending several of the public meetings of this Society namely the launch of the One Million Rupee Fund (Dasa Laksha Aramudala) held at the Colombo Town Hall on 6 September 1954 which was presided by Hon. Dudley Senanayake (then an ex Prime Minister of Ceylon) and the opening of the new Headquarters of the German Dharmaduta Society at 417, Bullers Road, Colombo 07, by Hon. S.W.R.D Bandaranaike, then Prime Minister of Ceylon, on 7 August 1956. Hon. C.W.W. Kannangara, in his capacity as the Minister of Local Government attended the opening ceremony of the Sixth Buddhist Council in Rangoon, Burma which commenced on 17 May 1954 and he read out the Message of Right Hon. Sir John Kotelawala, then Prime Minister of Ceylon, welcoming the inauguration of the Sixth Buddhist Council.

C.W.W. Kannangara retired from active politics in 1956. In 1961, he was awarded a DLitt by the Vidyodaya University. He died on 23 September 1969 at the Colombo General Hospital. His remains were cremated according to traditional Buddhist rites at the Anderson Golf Links which later became the site of the Bandaranaike Memorial International Conference Hall (BMICH) at Bauddhaloka Mawatha, Colombo 07. There are a number of institutions named after him in Sri Lanka.

A statue of C. W. W. Kannangara has been erected at the Parakramabahu Central College in Polgahawela. A new book under the title 'No Pearl of Greater Price' being a biography of C.W.W Kannangara written by the erudite Buddhist Scholar Dr. Ananda Guruge was released on 28 December 2013 at a public meeting held at the All Ceylon Buddhist Congress Auditorium

== Family ==
He married Edith Weerasooria, daughter of Gate Mudliyar James Charles Weerasooria, Mudliyar of the Kandy Kachcheri and the aunt of N.E.Weerasooria, QC of Lake Cottage, Kandy on 4 December 1922. They had two children, a son Dr. Chithraranjan Swarajweera Wijekoon Kannangara, a Consultant Gynecologist and a daughter Kusumawathi Wijekoon Senevirathne -nee Kannangara.

== Summary ==
C.W.W. Kannangara, known as the father of free education in Sri Lanka, played a pivotal role in transforming the country's education system. Born in 1894 in a small village in Ambalangoda, he faced numerous challenges in his early life, which fueled his determination to ensure that others would not suffer the same educational disadvantages. A brilliant student himself, Kannangara excelled in his studies and later became a dedicated educator and politician, committed to the cause of education.

Kannangara introduced the Free Education Bill in 1944, a groundbreaking initiative that aimed to provide accessible education to all children regardless of their socio-economic background. This bill was a radical departure from the existing system, which largely favored the wealthy and urban populations. His visionary reforms included establishing central schools, which offered quality education to rural areas, and providing scholarships to talented students, thereby promoting educational equity and opportunity. These central schools were strategically placed to serve the educational needs of rural children who otherwise had limited access to quality education.

In addition to these significant measures, Kannangara also advocated for a curriculum that was relevant and comprehensive, ensuring that students received a well-rounded education. He believed that education should not only be about academic learning but also about character building and equipping students with the skills needed for life.

C.W.W. Kannangara's efforts have left an impact on Sri Lanka.

== See also ==
- Education in Sri Lanka
- Sri Lankan Non Career Diplomats
- W. A. de Silva
