= V. S. de S. Wikramanayake =

Ceylonese lawyer and politician

Vincent Stuart de Silva Wikramanayake CBE, JPUM, (18 December 1876 – 1953) was a Ceylonese lawyer and politician. He served as a member of the Legislative Council (1924–1931) and State Council of Ceylon (1931–1935).

Wikramanayake was the youngest son of Charles Edward Wikramanayake (1843–1936) and Emilia Beth Sooriarachchi née Amarasekara.

At the fourth Legislative Council election held on 27 September 1924 he was elected as an unofficial member of the Legislative Council of Ceylon, representing the Southern Province Eastern Division. He defeated G. K. W. Perera, a barrister from Colombo. Perera won the initial vote but demanded a recount as he believed he had secured a greater majority of votes only to lose to Wikramanayake by 17 votes.

At the first State Council election in 1931, the election for Hambantota's seat was held on 13 June 1931 with only two candidates. Wikramanayake won with 15,384 votes defeating retired Mudaliyar H. Jayawardene, who received 4,467 votes, by a 10,917 vote majority.

At the second State Council election held in 1936 he was defeated by Don Mathew Rajapaksa, who was one of Wikramanayake's clerks. He was appointed a Commander of the Order of the British Empire in the 1950 Birthday Honours.

Wikramanayake married Cecilia née de Saram, daughter of the acting Gate Mudaliyar of Galle, Peter de Saram, with whom he had four children.
