= Waithilingam Duraiswamy =

Ceylon Tamil lawyer and politician

Sir Waithilingam Duraiswamy MLC MSC
- வைத்திலிங்கம் துரைசுவாமி

3rd Speaker of the State Council of Ceylon
- In office 17 March 1936 – 4 July 1947
- Preceded by: Forester Augustus Obeysekera

Member of the Legislative Council of Ceylon for Northern Province
- In office 1921–1924

Member of the Legislative Council of Ceylon for Northern Province West
- In office 1924–1930

Member of the State Council of Ceylon for Kayts
- In office 1936–1947
- Preceded by: Nevins Selvadurai

Personal details
- Born: 8 June 1874 Velanaitivu, Ceylon
- Died: 12 April 1966 (aged 91)
- Education: Jaffna College; Jaffna Central College; University of Calcutta; Ceylon Law College
- Profession: Lawyer
- Ethnicity: Ceylon Tamil

Sir Waithilingam Duraiswamy (Tamil: வைத்திலிங்கம் துரைசுவாமி; 8 June 1874 – 12 April 1966) was a Ceylon Tamil lawyer, politician and speaker of the State Council of Ceylon.

== Early life and family ==
Duraiswamy was born on 8 June 1874 in Velanaitivu, an island in the north of Ceylon. He was the son of Ayampillai Waithilingam, an engineer from Malaya. He was educated at Jaffna College and Jaffna Central College. After school he joined University of Calcutta, from where he graduated with a double honours degree. He then qualified as an advocate from the Ceylon Law College.

Duraiswamy was married to Rasammah from Maathakal, Jaffna. Duraiswamy had four sons (Yogendra, Rajendra, Mahendra and Devendra) and four daughters (Maheswari, Nadeswari, Parameswari and Bhuvaneswari).

== Career ==
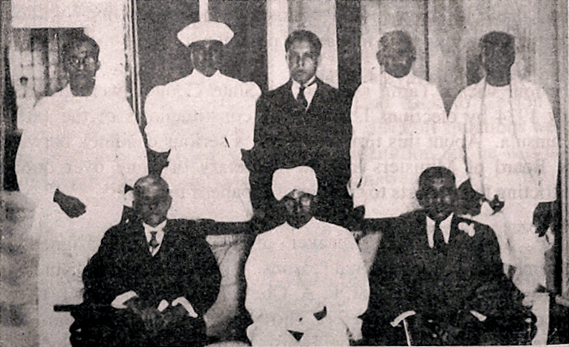
Sir Duraiswamy (Seated middle) as the Speaker of the Second State Council of Ceylon in 1936.

After qualifying Duraiswamy worked as an advocate, becoming a crown advocate and leader of the Jaffna Bar.

Duraiswamy contested the 1921 Legislative Council election as a candidate in Northern Province and was elected to the Legislative Council. He contested the 1924 Legislative Council election as a candidate in Northern Province West and was re-elected unopposed. He was a leading member of the Jaffna Youth Congress which advocated the boycott of the 1931 State Council elections. The boycott ended in 1934 but Duraiswamy did not contest the ensuing by-elections. He did however contest the 1936 State Council election as a candidate in Kayts and was elected to the State Council unopposed. Duraiswamy was elected Speaker of the State Council on 17 March 1936. He held this position until the State Council was replaced in 1947. Duraiswamy was knighted by King George VI in London in the 1937 Coronation Honours.

Duraiswamy contested in Kayts at the 1947 election but failed to get elected to the new Parliament after coming fourth. A wave of Tamil nationalism represented by the Tamil Congress had swept away the old guard of the legislature at the 1947 elections.

Duraiswamy was one of the founders of the Hindu Board of Education and served as its president in 1923. He helped establish more than 150 Hindu schools. He was a founder and president of the Tamil Union. He was also president of the Vivekananda Society and a leading member of the Saiva Paripalana Sabhai.

== Death ==
Duraiswamy died on 12 April 1966. A commemorative postage stamp in honour of Duraiswamy was issued on 14 June 1982.
