= I. X. Pereira =

Ceylonese businessman and politician

I. X. Pereira MLC MSC KCSS
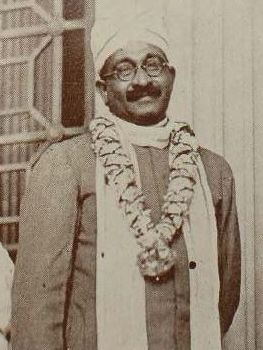
- Pereira in 1934

Dewan Bahadur

Member of the State Council of Ceylon
- In office 1931–1947

Member of the Legislative Council of Ceylon
- In office 1924–1931

Personal details
- Born: Ignatius Xavier Pereira; 26 April 1888 Tuticorin, Madras Presidency, British India (now Thoothukudi, Tamil Nadu, India)
- Died: 24 July 1951 (aged 63) Colombo, Western Province, Dominion of Ceylon (now Sri Lanka)
- Spouse: Margaret Pereira
- Parent: F. X. Pereira

Dewan Bahadur Chevalier Ignatius Xavier Pereira KCSS (26 April 1888 – 21 July 1951) was a colonial-era Ceylonese businessman and politician.

== Early life ==
Ignatius Xavier Pereira was born on 21 July 1888 in Tuticorin, Madras Presidency, British India as the eldest son of Francis Xavier Pereira. His father moved the family to Colombo in 1889, establishing the company, F. X. Pereira and Sons, which specialised in drapery and tailoring. Pereira was educated at St. Benedict's College, Kotahena. After his father died in March 1906, Pereira took over the running of the family business at the age of eighteen. He expanded the operations of the company to include shipping, insurance, manufacturing and general stores.

== Political career ==
In 1924, Pereira was elected to the Legislative Council of Ceylon, winning the seat reserved for the Indian community by a substantial majority, defeating Mohamed Sultan. In 1930, he travelled to London and met with the Secretary of State for the Colonies, Sidney Webb, regarding minority representation in the proposed Donoughmore Constitution. He was subsequently appointed as the nominated member representing the Tamil Indian community on the 1st State Council of Ceylon on 26 June 1931. In 1934, the Viceroy of India, Marquess of Willingdon, conferred him with the title Dewan Bahadur, in recognition of his services to the Tamil community.

Pereira was re-nominated to the 2nd State Council in 1936 and remained a member until the State Council was dissolved in 1947. He served on the Executive Committee for Labour, Industry and Commerce. During World War II Pereira was one of the few Ceylonese appointed to the War Council by the Commander-in-Chief Sir Geoffrey Layton in 1943. He also served as the Minister of Labour, Industry and Commerce when Sir Claude Corea left to take up a position as the Ceylonese Representative to the United Kingdom in 1946. In the same year Pope Pius XII invested him with the Papal Knighthood and made him the Knight Commander of the Order of Saint Sylvester, for his philanthropy and services to the church.

Pereira was also a member of the Colombo Port Commission, the Board of Indian Immigrant Labour, the President of the Indian Mercantile Chamber, the Indian Club and the Vice President of the All Ceylon Tamil Congress.

In 1948, he declined the offer by Prime Minister D. S. Senanayake of a position on the Senate of Ceylon due to his deteriorating health.

== Death ==
He died on 21 July 1951, at the age of 63.

== Legacy ==
A stamp was issued in his honour coinciding with his 100th birth anniversary in 1988 and subsequently a road was named after him in Pettah by the Colombo Municipal Council.
