= First Board of Ministers of Ceylon =

First Board of Ministers
- 22nd Cabinet of British Ceylon
- Date formed: July 1931
- Date dissolved: December 1935

People and organisations
- Head of state: George V
- Deputy head of government: Don Baron Jayatilaka
- Total no. of members: 10

History
- Election: 1931
- Outgoing election: 1936
- Legislature term: 1st
- Predecessor: Thomson executive council
- Successor: Second Board of Ministers

The First Board of Ministers was the executive body opposite the State Council of Ceylon between 1931 and 1936. It was formed in July 1931 after the state council election and it ended in December 1935 with dissolution of the first 1st State Council. The Board of Ministers consisted of ten members, three ex-officio British officials (Chief Secretary, Financial Secretary and Legal Secretary) and the chairmen of the State Council's seven executive committees. The Chief Secretary was the chairman of the Board of Ministers whilst the Leader of the State Council was its vice-chairman.

== Members ==
Minister	Office	Took office	Left office
Bernard Henry Bourdillon	Chief Secretary	1931	1935
Edward St John Jackson	Legal Secretary	1931	1935
Wilfrid Wentworth Woods	Financial Secretary	1931	1935
Charles Batuwantudawe	Minister of Local Administration	1931	1935
Don Baron Jayatilaka	Minister of Home Affairs	1931	1935
C. W. W. Kannangara	Minister of Education	1931	1935
Mohamed Macan Markar	Minister of Communications & Works	1931	1935
T. B. Panabokke	Minister of Health	1931	1936
D. S. Senanayake	Minister of Agriculture & Lands	1931	1935
Peri Sundaram	Minister of Labour, Industry & Commerce	1931	1935
