= Boteju =

Boteju is a surname. Notable people with the surname include:

- Chaminda Boteju (born 1975), Sri Lankan cricketer
- Hemantha Boteju (born 1977), Sri Lankan cricketer
- W. E. Boteju (fl. 1920s), Ceylonese Christian clergyman and legislator
