= M. M. Subramaniam =

Ceylon Tamil lawyer and politician

Honourable M. M. Subramaniam MLC MSC
- ம. மு. சுப்பிரமணியம்

Member of the Legislative Council of Ceylon for Trincomalee
- In office 1924–1930

Member of the State Council of Ceylon for Trincomalee-Batticaloa
- In office 1931–1936
- Succeeded by: E. R. Tambimuttu

Personal details
- Born: c. 1870
- Died: 1945
- Profession: Lawyer
- Ethnicity: Ceylon Tamil

Mylvaganam Mudaliyar Subramaniam (Tamil: மயில்வாகனம் முதலியார் சுப்பிரமணியம், romanized: Mayilvākaṉam Mutaliyār Cuppiramaṇiyam; c. 1870 – 1945) was a Ceylon Tamil lawyer, politician and member of the Legislative Council of Ceylon and State Council of Ceylon.

== Early life and family ==
Subramaniam was born around 1870. He was the son of Mylvaganam Mudaliyar, a wealthy coconut estate owner from Sambativu near Trincomalee in eastern Ceylon.

Subramaniam had three sons - Alagrajah, Tharmarajah and Manickarajah.

== Career ==
Subramaniam was a crown proctor and a member of the Trincomalee District Local Board. He contested the 1924 legislative council election as a candidate for the Trincomalee seat and was elected to the Legislative Council of Ceylon. Subramaniam contested the 1931 state council election as a candidate for the Trincomalee-Batticaloa seat and was elected to the State Council of Ceylon. He was elected Deputy Chairman of Committees when the new State Council met in July 1931.

Subramaniam died in 1945.

== Electoral history ==
Electoral history of M. M. Subramaniam
| Election | Constituency | Party | Votes | Result |
|---|---|---|---|---|
| 1924 legislative council | Trincomalee | | | Elected |
| 1931 state council | Trincomalee-Batticaloa | | | Elected |
