= Arunachalam Mahadeva =

Ceylon Tamil lawyer, politician and diplomat

Sir Arunachalam Mahadeva KCMG MLC MSC
- அருணாசலம் மகாதேவா

Minister of Home Affairs
- In office 1942–1946
- Preceded by: D. B. Jayatilaka
- Succeeded by: Oliver Goonetilleke

Member of the Legislative Council of Ceylon for Western Province Tamil
- In office 1924–1930

Member of the State Council of Ceylon for Jaffna
- In office 1934–1947

Ceylonese High Commissioner to India
- In office 1948–1949
- Preceded by: M. W. H de Silva
- Succeeded by: C. Coomaraswamy

Personal details
- Born: A. Mahadeva; 5 October 1885 Matara, Ceylon
- Died: 8 June 1969 (aged 83)
- Citizenship: British Ceylon
- Party: United National Party
- Education: Christ's College, Cambridge
- Profession: Lawyer

Arunachalam Mahadeva, KCMG (Tamil: அருணாசலம் மகாதேவா, romanized: Aruṇācalam Makātēvā; 5 October 1885 – 15 April 1966) was a Ceylon Tamil lawyer, politician and diplomat. He served as Minister of Home Affairs (1942-1946) and High Commissioner to India (1948-1949).

== Early life and family ==
Mahadeva was born on 5 October 1885 in Matara in southern Ceylon. (Note: According to another source Mahadeva was born on 4 October 1885.) He was the son of P. Arunachalam, a leading civil servant, and Sornambal. He was educated at Royal College, Colombo where he won many prizes including the Turnour Prize. After school he joined Christ's College, Cambridge, graduating with honours degree in mathematics.

Mahadeva married Sivakami, daughter of M. Mootatamby, in 1918. They had a son (Balakumar) and a daughter (Swarnam).

== Career ==
Mahadeva was called to the bar at Lincoln's Inn and on returning to Ceylon qualified as a barrister-at-law. He joined the Attorney General's Department as a crown counsel. He also practised law as an advocate at the unofficial bar. He later served as principal of Parameshwara College, Jaffna, a boys school founded by his paternal uncle P. Ramanathan.

Mahadeva was associated with the Ceylon National Congress (CNC), a political party founded by his father. He served as one of the CNC's secretaries from 1917 to 1924 and remained a member of the CNC even after his father left in 1921. Mahadeva contested the 1924 legislative council election as a candidate for the Western Province Tamil seat and was elected to the Legislative Council. He did not contest the 1931 state council election due to the boycott organised by the Jaffna Youth Congress.

After leaving the Legislative Council Mahadeva worked as a manager in the State Mortgage Bank. The boycott ended in 1934 and Mahadeva contested the ensuing by-elections in Jaffna. He won the election and entered the State Council. He was re-elected at the 1936 state council election and in 1942 he became Minister of Home Affairs.

Mahadeva was one of the founding members of the United National Party (UNP) and served as one of its vice-presidents and secretary. He stood as the UNP candidate for Jaffna at the 1947 parliamentary election but was defeated by the All Ceylon Tamil Congress leader G. G. Ponnambalam. Mahadeva was Ceylonese High Commissioner to India from 1948 to 1949.

Mahadeva was knighted in the 1949 New Year Honours. He was made a Knight Commander of the Order of St Michael and St George in the 1955 New Year Honours. He was a member of the Public Service Commission from 1950 to 1957. Mahadeva devoted his retirement to cultural and religious affairs. He was a senior trustee of the Sri Ponnambala Vaneswara Temple at Sea Street in Kochchikade, built by his paternal grandfather A. Ponnambalam and rebuilt by his uncle P. Ramanathan. He was chief trustee of the Sri Arunachaleswarar Temple at Mutwal, built by his parents. He was patron of the Colombo Vivekananda Society, the Jaffna Saiva Paripalana Sabai and the Colombo North Hindu Paripalana Sabai. Mahadeva died on 8 June 1969.

== Electoral history ==
Electoral history of Arunachalam Mahadeva
Election	Constituency	Party	Votes	Result
1924 legislative council	Western Province Tamil			Elected
1934 state council by	Jaffna			Elected
1936 state council	Jaffna			Elected
1947 parliamentary	Jaffna	UNP	5,224	Not elected
