= John Giffening =

Ceylonese proctor and politician

John Frederick Giffening

Burgher member of the Legislative Council of Ceylon
- In office 1843–1851
- Preceded by: J. G. Hillebrand
- Succeeded by: Richard Morgan

Personal details
- Born: Johan Frederick Giffening; 4 February 1787 Colombo, Ceylon
- Died: 25 September 1851 (aged 64) Colombo, Ceylon
- Spouse: Henrietta Matilda Toussaint
- Children: seven

John Frederick Giffening (4 February 1787 - 25 September 1851) was a Ceylonese proctor, public notary and politician.

== Early life and education ==
John Frederick Geffening was born on 4 February 1787 in Colombo, Ceylon, the son of Reverend Bernhard Abraham Giffening (1762–1812), the head of the Dutch Reformed Church in Ceylon, and Maria Sophia née Francius (1754–1812). In 1796 the British formally took control of the Dutch colonies in Ceylon, with all the Dutch colonists who agreed to stay signing a treaty of capitulation, which guaranteed they would remain loyal and not defect if the Dutch attempted to re-conquer Ceylon. In 1807 Giffening was appointed as a proctor (a position similar to a solicitor) of the District Court and in 1811 a proctor of the Supreme Court.

== Professional career ==
He was subsequently appointed as one of the three proctors sitting on the bench of the Supreme Court of Ceylon (known as the Vice Admiralty Court). He also served on the Board of Examiners for many years, who James de Alwis described as being an old, narrow-minded austere but clever Dutch lawyer. In 1843 he was appointed as the second unofficial member of the Legislative Council of Ceylon, representing the Burgher community, replacing J. G. Hillebrand, following the later's appointment as a Judge of the Supreme Court.

== Personal life ==
Giffening married Henrietta Matilda Toussaint (1837-?) on 15 September 1858 at Wolvendaal Church. They had seven children: John Frederick (1859–1929); Edwin Arnold (b.1861); Dorothy Henrietta (b.1863); Peter Bernard Toussaint (1864–1925); Frederica Anna (1866–1938); Julian Theodore Louis (1870–1944); and Georgiana Matilda (c.1877-1944).

He died on 25 September 1851 in Colombo, at the age of 64. Richard Morgan was subsequently appointed to his seat on the Legislative Council.
