= Huxham (surname) =

Huxham is a surname. Notable people with the surname include:

- Harold James Huxham (fl. 1936–1946), British colonial administrator
- John Huxham (1692–1768), English physician
- John Huxham (politician) (1861–1949), Australian politician
