= Baba Zahiere Lye =

Ceylonese Malay politician

Marhoom Baba Zahiere Lye (7 November 1900 - 1969) was a Ceylonese Malay politician. He appointed as Member of Parliament in 1963. He married Evelyn Mashmoon Saldin, daughter of M. K. Saldin, member of the State Council of Ceylon.
