= Mylvaganam =

Mylvaganam is a given name and surname. People associated with the name include:

== Surname ==
- David Mylvaganam, a Canadian hitman accused of murder in 2010
- S. P. Mylvaganam
- Ganesh Mylvaganam

== Given name ==
- Mylvaganam Nimalrajan
- Mylvaganam Mudaliyar Subramaniam
