= J. C. Dias Bandaranaike =

John Charles Dias Bandaranaike was a Ceylonese lawyer and legislator. He was the Sinhalese member of the Legislative Council of Ceylon.

He was born to Jacabus Dias Wijewardena Bandaranaike, Mudaliyar of Governor Gate and translator of the Supreme Court. His brothers include Sir Harry Dias Bandaranaike and the Rev Canon Samuel William Dias Bandaranaike. Educated at the Colombo Academy, Dias Bandaranaike became a proctor. He succeeded his uncle J. G. Philipsz Panditaratne as the Sinhalese representative in the Legislative Council of Ceylon along with his brother Sir Harry Dias Bandaranaike in 1861.

== See also ==
- Bandaranaike family
