= J. G. Philipsz Panditaratne =

J. G. Philipsz Panditaratne was a Ceylonese legislator. He was one of the first unofficial members appointed to the Legislative Council of Ceylon representing the Sinhalese when it was formed in 1833 and served till 1861. He was succeeded by two of his nephews, Sir Harry Dias Bandaranaike and J. C. Dias Bandaranaike.

His sister Liyanage Catherine Philipsz Panditharatne married Jacabus Dias Wijewardena Bandaranaike, Mudaliyar of Governor Gate and Translator of Supreme Court.

== See also ==
- Bandaranaike family
