= W. H. de S. Jayasundara =

Ceylonese politician

Wilfred Hector de Silva Jayasundara was a Ceylonese politician. He was member of State Council of Ceylon elected from Narammala in by-election in 1933, following the death of Godfrey Edward Madawala. He was married to Evelyn Mildred de Silva, they had a daughter Yvonne Mohini Jayasundara.
