= S. Rajaratnam (Ceylonese lawyer) =

Ceylon Tamil lawyer (1884–1970)

S. Rajaratnam MLC
- சு. இராசரத்தினம்

Unofficial Member (Northern Province Central), Legislative Council of Ceylon

Personal details
- Born: 4 July 1884 Kopay, Ceylon
- Died: 12 March 1970 (aged 85)
- Profession: Lawyer
- Ethnicity: Ceylon Tamil

Subramaniam Rajaratnam (Tamil: சுப்ரமணியம் இராசரத்தினம்; c4 July 1884 – 12 March 1970) was a Ceylon Tamil lawyer and member of the Legislative Council of Ceylon.

== Early life and family ==
Rajaratnam was born around 4 July 1884 in Kopay in northern Ceylon.

Rajaratnam married Achchuvely.

== Career ==
After qualifying as an advocate Rajaratnam practised law in Colombo and Jaffna.

Rajaratnam was elected to the Legislative Council of Ceylon as the member for the Northern Province Central at the 1924 election.

As its chairman, Rajaratnam played a key role in the foundation and growth of the Hindu Board which, at one time, managed more than 150 schools.

Rajaratnam died on 12 March 1970.
