= 1917 Ceylonese Legislative Council election =

2nd Ceylonese Legislative Council election
← 1911	9–20 January 1917	1921 →

The second election to the Legislative Council of Ceylon was held 20 January 1917.

== Background ==
In 1833 the Colebrooke-Cameron Commission created the Legislative Council of Ceylon, the first step in representative government in British Ceylon. Initially the Legislative Council consisted of 16 members: the British Governor, the five appointed members of the Executive Council of Ceylon, four other government officials and six appointed unofficial members (three Europeans, one Sinhalese, one Tamil and one Burgher).

In 1889 the number of appointed unofficial members was increased to eight (three Europeans, one Low Country Sinhalese, one Kandyan Sinhalese, one Tamil, one Muslim and one Burgher).

The Legislative Council was reformed in 1910 by the McCallum Reforms. Membership was increased to 21 of which 11 were officially appointed and 10 were unofficial (two elected Europeans, one elected Burgher, one elected educated Ceylonese, two appointed Low Country Sinhalese, two appointed Tamils, one appointed Kandyan Sinhalese and one appointed Muslim). Less than 3,000 Ceylonese were eligible to vote for the four elected unofficial members.

== Unofficial members ==
The following were the elected unofficial members :

- elected Ceylonese member – Ponnampalam Ramanathan was elected with 1704 votes while his opponent, J. S. Jayawardene received only 48.
- appointed Tamil member – Arunachalam Sabapathy
- appointed Muslim member – Noordeen Hadjiar Mohamed Abdul Cadder
- appointed Low-Country Sinhalese member – Marcus Fernando
- appointed Low-Country Sinhalese member – Wickelia Oswald Christopher Dissanayaka
- appointed Up-Country Sinhalese member – Meedeniya Rajakaruna Senanayake
