= G. K. Stewart =

British businessman

George King Stewart was a British businessman in Ceylon. He was an appointed member of the State Council of Ceylon, Chairmen of the Ceylon Chamber of Commerce and Chairman of the Ceylon Tea Propaganda Board.
