= J. G. Hillebrand =

Supreme Court of Ceylon

Acting Puisne Justice of the Supreme Court of Ceylon
- In office 23 November 1839 – 1841
- Appointed by: James Alexander Stewart-Mackenzie
- Preceded by: John Fredrick Stoddart
- Succeeded by: William Ogle Carr

Burgher member of the Legislative Council of Ceylon
- In office 1825–1843

Personal details
- Born: John Godfried Hillebrand c. 1782
- Died: 12 April 1847 (aged 65) Colombo, Ceylon

John Godfried Hillebrand (c. 1782 – 12 April 1847) was a Puisne Justice of the Supreme Court of Ceylon. He was the first Burgher to sit on the bench of the Supreme Court of Ceylon as well as the first Burgher member of the Legislative Council of Ceylon from 1825 to 1843. He was appointed, after the death of John Fredrick Stoddart, as Acting Second Puisne Justice on 23 November 1839. Hillebrand retained his Legislative Council seat while on the bench. He was the first Proctor to sit on the Sri Lankan Supreme Court. He was replaced on the bench by William Ogle Carr

Legal offices
Preceded by John Fredrick Stoddart	Puisne Justice of the Supreme Court of Ceylon; 1839-1941	Succeeded by William Ogle Carr
