= O. C. Tillekeratne =

Ceylonese politician

Wickelia Oswald Christopher Dissanayaka Tillekeratne (died 13 April 1923) was a Ceylonese politician. He was elected member of the Legislative Council of Ceylon representing the Sinhalese in the 1917 legislative council election and was re-elected as the representative for the Southern Province in the 1921 legislative council election. He died on 13 April 1923 in a fatal train accident at the Wellawatte train station while in-office. He was succeeded by his kinsmen C. W. W. Kannangara in the by-election that followed for the vacant seat.
