= Youth Leagues (Ceylon) =

The Youth Leagues were societies of young people, mainly intellectuals, who wanted independence for Sri Lanka.

The first of these organisations was the Jaffna Students’ Congress, founded in 1924 and renamed the Jaffna Youth Congress (JYC) in 1926. It had its base amongst educated middle-class Tamil youth, especially and young graduates from Indian Universities and from the newly founded University College, Colombo. It drew enthusiasm and morale boosts from visits of leading Indian personalities, such as Gandhi and Nehru.

In 1931 Kamaladevi Chattopadyaya addressed the opening session of the All-Ceylon Youth Congress, which brought together the Youth Leagues in the All-Ceylon Youth Congress.

A group of young intellectuals who had returned to the island in the early thirties, having completed their studies abroad where they had been influenced by the Marxist and labour movements, enthusiastically participated in the radical activities of the newly formed Youth Leagues, which became a focus of anti-imperialist agitation among the youth.

In February 1933 they became involved in a strike at the Wellawatte Spinning and Weaving mills, the island's largest textile factory at that time with 1,400 workers (two-thirds of Indian origin and one-third Sinhalese). This gave the Youth Leaguers a chance for leadership as well as experience in trade union agitation. The South Colombo Youth League published an irregular journal in Sinhala, Kamkaruwa (The Worker).

In November 1933 the Youth League radicals initiated a dynamic revival of the Suriya-Mal Movement. In opposition to the official Poppy Day sponsored by the British colonial administration (which sent the funds it raised to Britain) the Youth Leagues sold the local Suriya (Portia tree) flower, with the proceeds going to Ceylonese ex-servicemen. During the malaria epidemic in 1934-5 these activists did relief work in the disease-stricken areas where over 100,000 people died.

The Ministers of the Ceylon National Congress petitioned the colonial government to increase their powers, instead of demanding full independence, or even dominion status. They were forced to withdraw their 'Ministers' Memorandum' after a vigorous campaign by the Youth Leagues.
