= M. K. Saldin =

Mohamed Khalid Saldin (1870-1944) was a Ceylonese businessman/philanthropist and politician.

Mohamed Khalid Saldin was born in 1870 in Colombo, the youngest son (of seven children) to Baba Ounus Saldin (1832-1906), businessman, editor and publisher of Alamat Langkapuri (the first Malay newspaper), and Nyona Nurani née Janan (his first wife).

In 1906 Salid inherited his father's business (an import and export company) and under the name of M. K. Saldin & Company further expanded its operations. He was elected the first president of the All Ceylon Malay Association in January 1923.

He was appointed by the Governor, Graeme Thomson, as one of eight additional members to the 1st State Council of Ceylon, on 26 June 1931, representing the Malay community.

Saldin married Dane Ayu née Sabar (1878-?) and they eight children. His daughters, Evelyn Mashmoon (1908-1992) married Baba Zahiere Lye, appointed member of Parliament (1963-1965), and Hazelyn Suhan (1911-1985) married Mohamed Purvis Drahaman, appointed member of Parliament (1956–1963). His second wife was Nona Juhari née Borehan (1881-?), with whom he had four children. His third wife was Nona Dane Wangsa née Sabar, with whom he had two children.
