= Wilfred Martin Rajapakse =

Ceylonese politician

Wilfred Martin Rajapakse (1864 – ????) was a Ceylonese lawyer and politician. He was a member of the Legislative Council of Ceylon from 1921 to 1924.

Born in Colombo to Mudaliar John de Silva Rajapakse, he was educated at Royal College, Colombo and apprenticed under Frederick Dornhorst, becoming Proctor of the District Court in 1890 and of the Supreme Court in 1894 and a Notary Public. He had his practice in Negombo, where he owned several coconut estates in the districts of Negombo and Chilaw. On various occasions he had as acted as the District Judge, Commissioner of Requests and the Police Magistrate of Negombo. He married Catherine, daughter of B. Mendis of Colombo and the family lived at The Retreat, Negombo. He was elected member of the Legislative Council of Ceylon representing the Western Province (Division A) in the 1921 legislative council election.
