= W. A. de Silva =

Ceylonese veterinary surgeon, politician and philanthropist

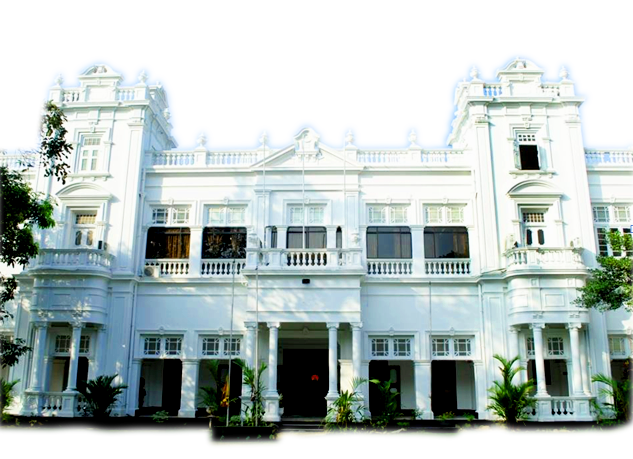
W. A. de Silva's home Sravasti Mandiraya which he presented to the state.

Wilmot Arthur de Silva (15 March 1869 - April 1942) was a Ceylonese veterinary surgeon, politician and philanthropist. He was the Minister of Health (1936–1942) in the second State Council of Ceylon and a former President of the Ceylon National Congress.

== Early life ==
Wilmot Arthur de Silva was born on 15 March 1869 in Unawatuna, he had his early education at the Buona Vista School, and his secondary education at Richmond College in Galle. He then entered the University in Bombay and later worked as the veterinary surgeon of the Colombo Municipal Council. He was also the President of the Buddhist Theosophical Society (BTS) and General Manager of the BTS Schools for fifteen years. He was also a major figure and financier of the temperance movement.

== Political career ==
An elected member of the Legislative Council of Ceylon in 1952 and in the 1931 Ceylonese State Council election he was elected to the first State Council of Ceylon from Moratuwa, and served in the executive committee of Local Administration. In the 1936 Ceylonese State Council election he was re-elected from Moratuwa the second State Council, where he was elected the Minister of Health and chairman of the executive committee of Health. During his tenure he greatly improved the health services of the island, what Kannangara was to education, De Silva was to heath. He resigned from his post on 18 February 1942 on the grounds of health and age. He is considered a national hero of the island nation for his contribution to health, the revival of Buddhism, the temperance movement and the Sri Lankan independence movement.

== Personal life ==
De Silva married Catherine née Sri Chandrasekera, who came from an affluent Buddhist family in Moratuwa, and inherited the estate of her millionaire father Mudaliyar Simon Fernando Sri Chandrasekera. His nephew was Sir Susantha de Fonseka, Deputy Speaker of the State Council of Ceylon, who he raised.

== Philanthropy ==
Dr De Silva and his wife were well known philanthropists, they founded the Sri Lankadhara Society in 1922 having built a purpose built building at High Street, Wellawatta to house underprivileged girls and women. He bequeathed his house Sravasti Mandiraya to the state in which he entertained the likes of Jawaharlal Nehru, Rabindranath Tagore and Lord Donougmore.
