= Maurice John Cary =

Ceylonese politician (1871–1938)

Maurice John Cary JP UPM (1871 – 12 August 1938) was an appointed member of the 1st and 2nd State Councils of Ceylon.

Maurice John Cary was born in London in 1871, the son of George Goldney Cary, a barrister at law.

Cary migrated to Ceylon in 1896 where he served as the manager of the Colombo Commercial Company Ltd. He was a director of the Colombo YMCA between 1929 and 1930, and was the chairman of the Ceylon Chamber of Commerce between 1929 and 1931.

Cary married Emily Winifred Thomas on 30 October 1900 at the Isle of Wight.

He was appointed one of the European members of the 1st State Council of Ceylon in 1931 and subsequently in 1936 was re-appointed to the 2nd State Council of Ceylon.

He died in Edgbaston, Birmingham, in 1938.
