= 1924 Ceylonese Legislative Council election =

4th Ceylonese Legislative Council election
← 1921	1924	1931 →

34 seats to the Legislative Council of Ceylon 18 seats were needed for a majority

The fourth election to the Legislative Council of Ceylon was held in 1924.

== Background ==
In 1833 the Colebrooke-Cameron Commission created the Legislative Council of Ceylon, the first step in representative government in British Ceylon. Initially the Legislative Council consisted of 16 members: the British Governor, the five appointed members of the Executive Council of Ceylon, four other government officials and six appointed unofficial members (three Europeans, one Sinhalese, one Tamil and one Burgher).

In 1889 the number of appointed unofficial members was increased to eight (three Europeans, one Low Country Sinhalese, one Kandyan Sinhalese, one Tamil, one Muslim and one Burgher).

The Legislative Council was reformed in 1910 by the McCallum Reforms. Membership was increased to 21 of which 11 were officially appointed and 10 were unofficial (two elected Europeans, one elected Burgher, one elected educated Ceylonese, two appointed Low Country Sinhalese, two appointed Tamils, one appointed Kandyan Sinhalese and one appointed Muslim). Less than 3,000 Ceylonese were eligible to vote for the four elected unofficial members.

Further reforms were enacted in 1920 by the First Manning Reforms. Membership was increased to 37 of which 14 were officially appointed and 23 were unofficial (11 elected on a territorial basis, five elected Europeans, two elected Burghers, one elected to represent the Chamber of Commerce, two appointed Kandyan Sinhalese, one appointed Muslim and one appointed Indian Tamil.

The Second Manning Reforms of 1923 increased membership to 49 of which 12 were officially appointed and 37 were unofficial (23 elected on a territorial basis, three elected Europeans, two elected Burghers, one elected Ceylon Tamil for the Western Province, three elected Muslims, two elected Indian Tamils and three other appointees).

The old Legislative Council was dissolved in August 1924 and elections held. Less than 205,000 Ceylonese (4%) were eligible to vote for the 34 elected unofficial members. The new Legislative Council was constituted on 15 October 1924.

== Elected unofficial members ==
The following were some of the elected unofficial members, by constituency:

- Central Province (Rural) – George E. de Silva.
- Eastern Province Batticaloa – E. R. Tambimuthu.
- Eastern Province Trincomalee – M. M. Subramaniam.
- Northern Province Central – S. Rajaratnam.
- Northern Province East – T M Sabaratnam.
- Northern Province North (Valikamam North) – Ponnambalam Ramanathan.
- Northern Province South – Arumugam Canagaratnam.
- Northern Province West – Waithilingam Duraiswamy.
- Southern Province Central (Matara) – Forester Augustus Obeysekera.
- Southern Province East (Hambantota) – V. S. de S. Wikramanayake.
- Southern Province West (Galle) – C. W. W. Kannangara, polled 4,177 votes.
- Western Province Negombo – Don Stephen Senanayake, elected unopposed.
- Western Province Kalutara – E. W. Perera.
- Ceylon Tamil for Western Province – Arunachalam Mahadeva.
- Indian Tamil 1 – I. X. Pereira.
- Indian Tamil 2 – K. Natesa Iyer.
- Muslim 1 – Mohamed Macan Markar.
- Muslim 2 – N. H. M. Abdul Cader.
- Muslim 3 – Tuan Burhanudeen Jayah.

== Appointed unofficial members ==
The Governor appointed the following unofficial members:

- K. Balasingham
