= W. T. B. Karaliadda =

Ceylonese educator and politician

Wijeratne Tikiri Bandara Karaliadda was a Ceylonese educator and politician.

Karaliadda was elected to the 1st State Council of Ceylon on 13 June 1931, representing the electorate of Matale. He was a member of the Ceylon Labour Party.
