= K. Natesa Iyer =

Sri Lankan journalist, trade union leader and politician

Kothandarama Natesa Iyer or S. K. Natesa Iyer (1887 - 7 November 1947) was a Sri Lankan journalist, trade union leader and politician of Indian Tamil origin, had pioneered the labour movement in the plantations in the early 1930s.

== Early life ==
Natesa Iyer was a Tamil Brahmin from Thanjavur who spent his early life as a clerk in Madras city. In 1920, moved to Ceylon in order to edit a Ceylonese Tamil newspaper Desanesan owned by Arunachalam and E. V. Rathnam of the Ceylonese National Congress.

== Political activities ==
Natesa Iyer joined the Ceylon Labour Union and soon became its Vice-President. He was elected to the Ceylonese Legislative Council and served as its member. However, soon afterwards, disputes broke out between the Tamil and Ceylonese members of the Ceylon Labour Union and A. E. Goonesinha, the President of the Union accused Indian Tamils for all the country's ills. Natesa Iyer quit the party in protest against Goonesinghe's attitude.

After quitting the Ceylon Labour Union, Natesa Iyer founded the All Ceylon Estate Labour Federation and started an English-language journal called "The Indian Estate Labourer".

In 1936, Natesa Iyer was elected to the State Council of Ceylon from the Hatton assembly constituency and served as a member of the council from 1936 to 1947. He was the first member of the Indian Tamil community to be appointed to the council.
