= H. R. Freeman =

Herbert Rayner Freeman (6 March 1864 - April 1945) was an English born Ceylonese public servant and politician.

Herbert Rayner Freeman was born in Suffolk, England on 6 March 1864, was educated at Marlborough College, England (between 1878 and 1882) and went to Ceylon to join the Ceylon Civil Service during 1885. Freeman served with the Government Agent's Office (the "Kachcheri") in Jaffna (1891), Galle (1885), Kurunegala (1886), Galle (1889-1890), Jaffna (1891) and Puttalam (1902). During this time, he served as the Police Constable of Kandy, Matara, Hatton, Galle and as a District Judge he worked in Jaffna, Kegalle and Chilaw. He served as Acting Chief Minister of the Eastern Province and as the Government Agent of the Eastern Province (1907) and the Government Agent for the Northern Province (1910). He was appointed as the Government Agent of the Western Province (1913-1914). During that time, he was a member of the Legislative Committee and the Committee on the Epidemiological Committee. In 1915 Freeman was appointed as Government Agent of the North-Central Province a job he maintained until he retired on 20 November 1919, at the age of 55, having served with the Ceylon Civil Service for 32 years. At retirement he had the option of returning to England or remaining in Ceylon. He decided to remain and engage himself in working for the improvement of the life of the villagers of the North Central Province.

In 1924 Freeman contested the seat for the North Central Province in the Legislative Council of Ceylon, winning the election on 12 September 1924 by a majority of 7,423 having received 8,311 votes as against 888 for the incumbent, S. D. Krisnaratne.

In 1931 he was elected to the 1st State Council of Ceylon, with 7,423 votes, representing Anuradhapura and in 1936 was re-elected unopposed to the 2nd State Council of Ceylon, serving with the executive committee for Communications and Works.
