= N. E. Weerasooria =

N. E. Weerasooria KC PC

Personal details
- Born: Norman Edward Weerasooria; 1 January 1895 Colombo, British Ceylon
- Died: 15 May 1974 (aged 79) Colombo, Sri Lanka
- Education: Royal College Colombo
- Profession: Lawyer

Norman Edward Weerasooria KC (1 January 1895 – 15 May 1974) was an eminent Sri Lankan lawyer.

Educated at Royal College Colombo, where he edited the College Magazine and at the Ceylon Law College. He gained prominence as a lawyer being appointed in 1938 as one of the youngest King's Counsel in Sri Lanka, and as a historian authoring several books on Sri Lanka.

In the 1953 he was appointed to chair the Commission of Broadcasting and in the early 1960s he was the founding Chairmen of the Ceylon Petroleum Corporation in the 1960s.

He used the pen-name "Fijjik".

== Selected publications ==
- Tales of Old Ceylon (1963) (4 vols.)
- Modern Ceylon Through the Looking Glass (1965)
- Ceylon and her People
- Ran Kumari - A Golden Princess of the Kandyan Hills
