= G. R. de Zoysa =

Ceylonese politician

Garumuni Robert de Zoysa was a Ceylonese politician. He was member of State Council of Ceylon elected from Balapitiya from the Ceylon National Congress. His brothers were Ian de Zoysa and Arthur de Zoysa. Herbert Sri Nissanka was his nephew.
