= 1921 Ceylonese Legislative Council election =

3rd Ceylonese Legislative Council election
← 1917	21 April 1921	1924 →

19 seats to the Legislative Council of Ceylon 10 seats were needed for a majority

The third election to the Legislative Council of Ceylon was held on 21 April 1921.

== Background ==
In 1833 the Colebrooke-Cameron Commission created the Legislative Council of Ceylon, the first step in representative government in British Ceylon. Initially the Legislative Council consisted of 16 members: the British Governor, the five appointed members of the Executive Council of Ceylon, four other government officials and six appointed unofficial members (three Europeans, one Sinhalese, one Tamil and one Burgher).

In 1889 the number of appointed unofficial members was increased to eight (three Europeans, one Low Country Sinhalese, one Kandyan Sinhalese, one Tamil, one Muslim and one Burgher).

The Legislative Council was reformed in 1910 by the McCallum Reforms. Membership was increased to 21 of which 11 were officially appointed and 10 were unofficial (two elected Europeans, one elected Burgher, one elected educated Ceylonese, two appointed Low Country Sinhalese, two appointed Tamils, one appointed Kandyan Sinhalese and one appointed Muslim). Less than 3,000 Ceylonese were eligible to vote for the four elected unofficial members.

Further reforms were enacted in 1920 by the First Manning Reforms. Membership was increased to 37 of which 14 were officially appointed and 23 were unofficial (11 elected on a territorial basis, five elected Europeans, two elected Burghers, one elected to represent the Chamber of Commerce, two appointed Kandyan Sinhalese, one appointed Muslim and one appointed Indian Tamil.

== Elected unofficial members ==
The following were some of the elected unofficial members, by constituency:

- Central Province – Gerard Wijeyekoon.
- Eastern Province – E. R. Tambimuthu, elected unopposed.
- Northern Province – Waithilingam Duraiswamy.
- North Central Province – E. R. Krishnaratne.
- North Western Province – Charles Edgar Corea.
- Sabaragamuwa Province – W. E. Boteju, polled 615 votes.
- Southern Province – O. C. Tillekeratne.
- Uva Province – Henry Kotelawala.
- Western Province Colombo – James Peiris.
- Western Province Division A – W. M. Rajapaksa.
- Western Province Division B – E. W. Perera.
- Chamber of Commerce (Low-Country Products Association) – Henry de Mel, elected unopposed.
