= Forester Augustus Obeyesekere =

Sri Lankan politician (1880–1961)

Hon. Forester Augustus Obeyesekere MSC

2nd Speaker of the State Council
- In office 11 December 1934 – 7 December 1935
- Preceded by: Alfred Francis Molamure
- Succeeded by: Waithilingam Duraiswamy

Personal details
- Education: Royal College, Colombo

Forester Augustus Obeyesekere (7 August 1880 – 26 December 1961) was a prominent colonial era legislator from Ceylon. He was the Speaker of the State Council of Ceylon and a member of the Legislative Council of Ceylon.

Born to Sir Solomon Christoffel Obeyesekere a member of the Legislative Council, F A Obeysekera was educated at Royal College, Colombo, where he captained the cricket team at the Royal-Thomian and played for the Singhalese Sports Club. He later studied at Cambridge University.

He was elected an unofficial member from the Southern Province Central (Matara) to the Legislative Council in the 1924 Legislative Council election and retained his seat till the Legislative Council was dissolved and replaced by the State Council in the 1931 State Council election, when he was elected as deputy speaker. In 1934, he became Speaker when Sir Francis Molamure stepped down for personal reasons.

He married Amy Isabel Sykes and they had two children, Boykin and Ezlynne. Ezlynne married Ralph Deraniyagala, MBE who became the Clerk of Parliament.

== See also ==
- List of political families in Sri Lanka
- Bandaranaike family
