= John Fredrick Stoddart =

Ceylonese judge

13th Puisne Justice of the Supreme Court of Ceylon
- In office 2 June 1838 – 19 August 1839
- Appointed by: James Alexander Stewart-Mackenzie

Personal details
- Born: 22 September 1805 Malta
- Died: 29 August 1839 (aged 33) Colombo, British Ceylon
- Education: University of Glasgow

John Fredrick Stoddart (22 September 1805 – 29 August 1839) was a Puisne Justice of the Supreme Court of Ceylon. Stoddart was the son of John Stoddart, Chief Justice of Malta.

Legal offices
Preceded by	Puisne Justice of the Supreme Court of Ceylon; 1838-1839	Succeeded by
