= Harold James Huxham =

Harold James Huxham CMG was a British colonial financial administrator. He was the Financial Secretary of Ceylon from 1936 to 1946 and ex-offico member of the Second Board of Ministers of Ceylon.

== Honours ==
- 1936 Birthday Honours: Companion of the Order of St Michael and St George
