= W. E. Boteju =

Rev Jayawardene Welatantrige Edwin Boteju was a Ceylonese Christian clergyman and legislator. He was elected unofficial member of the Legislative Council of Ceylon representing the Sabaragamuwa Province in the 1921 legislative council election.
