= V. R. S. Schokman =

Sri Lankan politician (1887–1953)

Vivian Roy Stanley Schokman (14 November 1887 – 9 June 1953) was a Ceylonese politician and physician.

Vivian Roy Stanley Schokman was born on 14 November 1887 in Colombo, the eldest son of Walter Russell Schokman (1861–1912) and Agnes Maud née Baillie (1867–1912), in a family of seven children. He was educated at Royal College, Colombo and at the Ceylon Medical College.

He married Muriel Gertrude née Metzeling (1886–1935) on 24 March 1913 at the Dutch Reformed Church in Bambalapitiya. They had three children, Vivan Douglas (b.1913), Muriel Eileen Phyllis (b.1915) and Estelle Maud (b.1916).

Schockman was elected to the Colombo Municipal Council and served as the Mayor of Colombo from 1938 to 1939. He appointed to the first Senate of Ceylon in 1947 and was an appointed member of the inaugural Parliament. He served as the first President of the Ceylon Olympic and Empire Games Association, the precursor to the National Olympic Committee of Sri Lanka.

He died on 9 June 1953 in Havelock Town at the age of 65.
