= Jaffna Youth Congress =

First of Sri Lanka's Youth Leagues

The Jaffna Youth Congress, was the first of Sri Lanka's Youth Leagues. It was influenced by the Indian Independence Movement, was secular and committed to Poorana Swaraj (Complete Self-Rule), national unity and the eradication of inequalities imposed by caste.

== History ==
The Jaffna Students’ Congress was founded in 1924 and renamed the Jaffna Youth Congress (JYC) in 1926. It had its base among educated middle-class Tamil youth, especially young graduates from Indian Universities and from the newly founded University College, Colombo. It drew enthusiasm and morale boosts from visits of leading Indian personalities. In 1927, the JYC invited Indian independence movement leader Mahatma Gandhi to visit Jaffna. In 1931 Kamaladevi Chattopadhyay addressed the opening session of the All-Ceylon Youth Congress, and was said to have taken Jaffna by storm.

Like the Indian National Congress in India, the causes the JYC advocated were secularism, a non-sectarian Ceylonese nationalism and independence from Britain. For this reason, it enjoyed much respect from Sinhalese intellectuals in the south of the country. S.W.R.D. Bandaranaike addressed the Youth Congress sessions, advocating, for the first time, a federal constitution for Ceylon.

The JYC led a successful boycott of the first State Council elections in Jaffna in 1931, arguing that the Donoughmore reforms did not concede enough self-government.
