= Legislative Council of Ceylon =

Legislative body of Ceylon (now Sri Lanka)

- British Ceylon

Type
- Type: Unicameral

History
- Established: 13 March 1833
- Disbanded: 1931
- Preceded by: None
- Succeeded by: State Council of Ceylon
- Seats: 15 (1833–1889); 18 (1889–1910); 21 (1910–1920); 37 (1920–1923); 49 (1923–1931)

Elections
- Last election: 1924 Ceylonese Legislative Council election

Meeting place
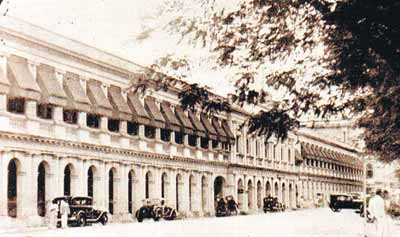
- The Legislative Council building in Colombo Fort. The building was used by the Senate of Ceylon between 1947 and 1971. Today it is known as the Republic Building and houses the Ministry of Foreign Affairs.

The Legislative Council of Ceylon was the legislative body of Ceylon (now Sri Lanka) established in 1833, along with the Executive Council of Ceylon, on the recommendations of the Colebrooke-Cameron Commission. It was the first form of representative government in the island. The 1931 Donoughmore Constitution replaced the Legislative Council with the State Council of Ceylon.

Members of the Legislative Council, used the post-nominal letters, MLC.

== History ==
=== Introduction ===
In 1833 the Colebrooke-Cameron Commission created the Legislative Council of Ceylon, the first step in representative government in British Ceylon. Initially the Legislative Council consisted of 16 members: the British governor, the five appointed members of the Executive Council of Ceylon (the colonial secretary, the attorney general, the auditor-general, the treasurer and the general officer commanding), four other government officials (including the government agents of the Western and Central provinces) and six appointed unofficial members (three Europeans, one Sinhalese, one Tamil and one Burgher). The unofficial members had no right to initiate legislation; they could only contribute to discussion. This was the first step towards giving the people of the country a voice in its administration. However, in 1860 the member of the Legislative Council were given the right to introduce legislation which did not deal with the financial matters.

In 1889 the number of appointed unofficial members was increased to eight (three Europeans, one Low Country Sinhalese, one Kandyan Sinhalese, one Tamil, one Muslim and one Burgher).

=== McCallum Reforms ===
The Legislative Council was reformed in 1910 by the McCallum Reforms. Membership was increased from 18 to 21, of which 11 were official and 10 were unofficial. Of the non-official members, six were appointed by the governor (two Low Country Sinhalese, two Tamils, one Kandyan Sinhalese and one Muslim) and the remaining four were elected (two Europeans, one Burgher and one educated Ceylonese).

The most notable aspect of the McCallum Reforms was the introduction of elected members. However, fewer than 3,000 people could vote, as the right to vote was based on education and assets held. One of the four elected non-official members was Ponnambalam Ramanathan. The financial committee was also established to control the revenue. It included the colonial secretary, colonial treasurer, revenue controller and all the non-official elected members. These changes did not satisfy the Ceylonese, and the movement for constitutional reforms grew.

=== First Manning Reforms ===
Further reforms were enacted in 1920 by the First Manning Reforms. Membership was increased from 21 to 37, of which 14 were official and 23 were unofficial. Of the non-official members, four were appointed by the governor (two Kandyan Sinhalese, one Muslim and one Indian Tamil) and the remaining 19 were elected (11 on a territorial basis, five Europeans, two Burghers and one Chamber of Commerce).

A notable change was the introduction of territorial constituencies. Of the 11 territorial constituencies, three were from the Western Province and one each from the other eight provinces. Three non-official members were elected to the Executive Council. Yet again the Ceylonese were not satisfied and requested more change.

=== Second Manning Reforms ===
The Second Manning Reforms of 1923 increased membership from 37 to 49, of which 12 were official and 37 were unofficial. Of the non-official members, eight were appointed by the governor (three Muslim, two Indian Tamils and three others) and the remaining 29 were elected (23 on a territorial basis, three Europeans, two Burghers, one Ceylon Tamil for the Western Province). The 23 territorial constituencies were distributed as follows:

- Central Province 2
- Eastern Province 2
- Northern Province 5
- North Central Province 1
- North Western Province 2
- Sabaragamuwa Province 2
- Southern Province 3
- Uva Province 1
- Western Province 5

The head of the Legislative Council had been the governor, but the new reforms created the post of the president of the Legislative Council, which was held by the governor on a nominal basis, and the vice president of the Legislative Council was elected, who was James Peiris. Four non-official members were also selected to be part of the Executive Council.

=== Replacement ===
Due to the shortcomings of the Second Manning Reforms the Donoughmore Commission was sent to Ceylon. The Commission gained its name from the royal commission under the Earl of Donoughmore that came to Ceylon in 1927. Its recommendations led to Ceylon gaining limited self-government and the replacement of the Legislative Council with the State Council of Ceylon in 1931.

== Members of the Legislative Council ==
=== President ===
The president of the council was the governor of Ceylon.

=== Official members ===
Official members included permanent or acting office holders:

- Colonial Secretary of Ceylon
- General Officer Commanding, Ceylon
- Attorney General of Ceylon
- Auditor General of Ceylon
- Treasurer of Ceylon
- Government Agent, Western Province
- Government Agent, Central Province
- Postmaster General of Ceylon
- Principal Collector of Customs

=== Unofficial members ===
==== Burgher ====
- J. G. Hillebrand, appointed (1833-1843)
- John Frederick Giffening, appointed (1843-1851)
- Sir Richard Morgan, appointed (1851–1856)
- Charles Ambrose Lorensz, appointed (1856–1864)
- James Adrianus Martensz, appointed (1865–1872)
- Charles Ferdinands, appointed (1873–1875)
- James Arthur Van Langenberg Sr., appointed (1876–1886)
- Peter Daniel Anthonisz, appointed (1886–1894)
- Henry Lorensz Wendt, appointed (1895–1900)
- Frederick Charles Loos, appointed (1900–1911)
- William Gregory van Dort, appointed (1911)
- James Van Langenberg Jr., appointed (1911)
- Hector William van Cuylenburg, elected (1911–1915)
- Charles Van der Waal, elected (1916)
- Allen Drieberg, elected
- Arthur Alvis, elected (1912)
- N. J. Martin, elected (1921–)
- Herman Loos, elected (1924)
- C. E. De Vos, elected (1924)
- George Alfred Henry Wille, elected (1924–1931)
- V. R. S. Schokman, elected (1931–?)
- J. R. Weinman

==== Chamber of Commerce ====
- Henry de Mel, elected (1921-)

==== Planting member ====
- George Ackland (1846-?)
- George Wall (1858–64)
- Reginald Beauchamp Downall (1876–88)
- Stewart Walter Loudoun-Shand (1882, 1884)
- Giles F. Walker (1894–97)
- J. N. Campbell
- Edward Rosling (1902– 1913)
- William Duff Gibbon (1907–?)
- Thomas North Christie

==== Educated Ceylonese ====
- Sir Ponnambalam Ramanathan, elected (1911–21)
- Sir James Peiris, elected (1921–24)

==== European ====
- Giles F. Walker (1898 - 1902)
- Thomas Lister Villiers (1924 - 1931)

==== Indian Tamil ====
- K. Natesa Iyer, elected (1924-)
- I. X. Pereira, elected (1924–31)

==== Kandyan Sinhalese ====
- Tikiri Bandara Panabokke I (1889-1892)
- Semasinghe Navaratne Wanninaake Hulugalle (1900–1906)
- Theodore Barcroft L. Moonemalle (1906-)
- William Ellawala, (1892-1897)
- Tikiri Bandara Panabokke II (1921-1931)
- J. H. Meedeniya Adigar (1921–1931)

==== Low Country Sinhalese ====
- Solomon Christoffel Obeyesekere, appointed (1900–1916)
- Alfred Joseph Richard de Soysa, appointed (1911-)

==== Muslim (Moor) ====
- Muhamed Cassim Abdul Rahman, appointed (1833-1889)
- Wapchie Marikar Abdul Rahman, appointed (1900-1915)
- Noordin Hadjiar Mohamed Abdul Cader, appointed (1917–1923), elected (1924–1931)
- Tuan Burhanudeen Jayah, elected (1924-1930)
- Mohamed Macan Markar, elected (1924–1931)

==== Sinhalese ====
- J. G. Philipsz Panditaratne, appointed (1833-)
- J. C. Dias Bandaranaike, appointed (−1861)
- Harry Dias Bandaranaike, appointed (1861–)
- James Dehigama, appointed
- James De Alwis, appointed (1864–)
- James Peter Obeyesekere I, appointed ( -1880)
- Albert L. De Alwis Seneviratne, appointed (1881–1899)

==== Tamil ====
- A. Coomaraswamy, appointed (1833–36)
- Simon Casie Chetty, appointed (1838–45)
- V. Edirmannasingham, appointed (1846–61)
- Muthu Coomaraswamy, appointed (1862–79)
- P. Ramanathan, appointed (1879–92)
- P. Coomaraswamy, appointed (1892–98)
- W. G. Rockwood, appointed (1898-06)
- A. Kanagasabai, appointed (1906–19)

==== Territorial ====
- W. E. Boteju, Sabaragamuwa Province (1921-)
- A. Canagaratnam, Northern Province South (1924-)
- Charles Edgar Corea, North Western Province (1921-1924)
- Victor Corea, Western Province Colombo (1924-)
- W. A. de Silva (1931–)
- Waithilingam Duraiswamy, Northern Province (1921–); Northern Province West (1924–)
- C. H. Z. Fernando, North Western Province (1924–)
- Marcus Fernando, Western Province Colombo (1921–)
- H. R. Freeman, North Central Province (1924–1930)
- C. W. W. Kannangara, Southern Province West (1924–)
- Henry Kotelawala, Uva Province (1921–)
- John Kotelawala
- S. D. Krisnaratne, North Central Province (1921–1924)
- Arunachalam Mahadeva, Western Province Ceylon Tamil (1924–)
- Forester Augustus Obeysekera, Southern Province Central (1924–)
- Tikiri Bandara Panabokke Adigar
- E. W. Perera, Western Province Division B (1921–), Western Province Kalutara (1924–)
- W. M. Rajapaksa, Western Province Division A (1921–)
- S. Rajaratnam, Northern Province Central (1924–)
- Ponnambalam Ramanathan, Northern Province North (1924–30)
- T. M. Sabaratnam, Northern Province East (1924–)
- Fredrick Richard Senanayake
- Don Stephen Senanayake, Western Province Negombo (1924–)
- M. M. Subramaniam, Eastern Province Trincomalee (1924–)
- E. R. Tambimuthu, Eastern Province (1921–); Eastern Province Batticaloa (1924–)
- O. C. Tillekeratne, Southern Province (1921–1923)
- A. C. G. Wijekoon, Central Province (1921–)
- V. S. de S. Wikramanayake, Southern Province East (1924–)
