= Donoughmore Commission =

Ceylonese colonial constitutional reform

The Donoughmore Commission (DC) was responsible for the creation of the Donoughmore Constitution in effect between 1931 and 1947 in Ceylon (now called Sri Lanka). In 1931 there were approximately 12% Ceylonese Tamils, 12% Indian Tamils (migrant and immigrant workers employed in the Tea plantations established in the late 19th century), 65% Sinhalese, and ~3% Ceylon Moors. The British government had introduced a form of communal representation which a strong Tamil representation, out of proportion to the population of the Tamil community. The Sinhalese had been divided into up-country and low-country Sinhalese.

== Commissioners ==
The commissioners were four British parliamentarians appointed by Sydney Webb, the first Labour Secretary of State for the Colonies on 13 November 1927. Their task was to draft a new constitution for Sri Lanka that would not only satisfy the aspirations of all the groups within the island, including British plantation owners, but also enable Sri Lanka to take its place as a partner in the socialist British Empire that Webb envisioned.

Two of the Commissioners, Dr. Drummond-Shiels and Frances Butler, had been Labour Party London County Councillors for many years prior to entering Parliament and serving in the short-lived Lib-Lab government coalition stitched together by Lloyd George in 1926. They were serious-minded men in the traditional Labour "Christian Socialist" mould. Above all, they were missionaries for the equitable, socialist vision of the world Webb was proselytising. Lord Donoughmore, on the other hand, was a genial Liberal peer, best known for championing women's right to university education and a gourmet palate.

== Consultation ==
The Donoughmore Commission arrived in Sri Lanka in 1927 and spent four months interviewing islanders. They held 34 sittings and interviewed 140 people. The Commissioners listened to a plea for female suffrage for educated women, and granted suffrage to all women aged 21 in Sri Lanka – at a time when British suffragettes were still fighting to have the voting age lowered from 28.

== System developed ==
Having noted that the island was riven by power struggles between competing ethnic groups, it devised a system of executive committees that would control all government departments. It rejected the principle of communal representation. Every parliamentarian in Sri Lanka would sit on one of these committees, ensuring that no one ethnic group could control all levers of power and patronage. Instead, all executive decisions would require a measure of consensus among the different ethnic representatives.

== Reception of the Constitution ==
The greatest misgiving of many of the Ceylonese leaders, both Sinhalese and Tamil, was the recommendation of universal franchise by DC. Jane Russell in her detailed study states that (p. 16) "Ponnambalam Ramnathan and most of the 'conservatives' believed and argued that the giving of the vote to the non-vellala castes and to women was not only a grave mistake, leading to 'mob rule', but Ramanathan explicitly suggested that it was anathema to the Hindu way of life". The political leadership of the Ceylon Tamils was left dumbfounded ... by the complete bouleversement of the policies they had pursued for the last decade(p. 18 ). Further, "the Sinhalese leaders were also very dubious about the new franchise, but were willing to support it in a quid pro quo for the abolition of communal electorates"(p. 17 ).

The All-Ceylon Tamil league first opposed the DC on the grounds that the abolition of the communal (representation) principle when coupled with the universal franchise proposal would mean "death to the minorities", as the Sinhalese would now receive over 50% of the seats. Then in 1929 there was a tactical change, the Tamils opposing it as the Donougmore Constitution did not grant full self-government (p 20,).

The leaders of the Jaffna Youth congress, a radical group, also opposed the DC, but for reasons entirely different from those of the conservative Tamils. They were followers of Nehru and Gandhi, and in 1925 called for the abolition of the caste system, cooperation with the Sinhalese, adoption of the national dress and "swabasha" in place of English. They called for a complete boycott of the Donoughmore Constitution. On 25 April 1931 the Jaffna Youth congress adopted the resolution that "this conference holds 'Swaraj' to be the inalienable birth-right of every people... Whereas the DC militates itself against the attainment of 'Swaraj', this congress further pledges itself to boycott the scheme"(p 29).

Thus the first State Council of Ceylon opened on 7 July 1931 with much pomp and ceremony, but without any of the established and experienced Ceylon Tamil political leaders. The leaders of the Youth Congress maintained up to 1934 that the boycott was justified, but later admitted that it was a grave mistake. Tamil leaders who did not take part in the boycott were Dr. Saravanamuttu (Colombo North), M. Subramanium (Trincomalee-Batticaloa), S. M. Ananthan (Mannar), Peri Sundaram (Hatton), S. P. Vytilingam (Talawakelle). G. G. Ponnambalam, an ambitious catholic lawyer from Colombo who did not belong to the elit group of the earlier Tamil leaders, also rejected the boycott. He eventually took control of the leadership of the Tamils. The Indian Tamils (Tea plantation workers who were annual immigrants or immigrants since the late 19th century) were not granted the franchise by the first State Council.

The majority Sinhalese MPs also worked hard to replace the DC by a cabinet model. They finally managed to get rid of it in 1947 when the Soulbury constitution came into being with independence in 1948.

Sri Lanka remained virtually independent under the Donoughmore constitution, with full control over domestic affairs, using the mechanism of universal suffrage to elect a national government at a time when only white countries in the European empires had that privilege, and continue its passage to relative prosperity without any major ethnic clashes for 16 years. Under the island's several subsequent constitutions, Sri Lanka has suffered communal violence.

== Donoughmore Commission in Fiction ==
Author Shyam Selvadurai offers a fictionalized account of the Donoughmore Commission in his novel Cinnamon Gardens.
