= Donoughmore Constitution =

Constitution of Ceylon from 1931 to 1947

The Donoughmore Constitution (Sinhala: ඩොනමෝර් ආණ්ඩුක්‍රම ව්‍යවස්ථාව, romanized: Ḍonamōr Āṇḍukrama Vyavasthāva; Tamil: டொனமூர் அரசியலமைப்பு, romanized: Ṭoṉamūr Araciyalamaippu), created by the Donoughmore Commission, served Sri Lanka (Ceylon) from 1931 to 1947 when it was replaced by the Soulbury Constitution.

It was a significant development. First, it was the only constitution in the British Empire (outside Dominions of Australia, South Africa and Canada) enabling general elections with adult universal suffrage. For the first time, a "dependent", non-caucasian country within the empires of Western Europe was given one-person, one-vote and the power to control domestic affairs. Here was the pilot project whose success would ensure freedom from colonial rule for whole swathes of Asia, Africa and the Caribbean.

Secondly, it created a committee system of government specifically to address the multi-ethnic problems of Sri Lanka. Under this system, no one ethnic community could dominate the political arena. Instead, every government department was overseen by a committee of parliamentarians drawn from all the ethnic communities. This created a built-in series of checks and balances, leading to continual 'pork-barrelling' and 'log-rolling', in which every ethnic group gained something. Consensual politics was thereby forced on Sri Lanka's reluctant political activists. Power and funding followed those with the ability to maximise broad-based multi-ethnic support: negotiators and peacemakers were therefore elevated above demagogues and warmongers.

The Donoughmore Commissioners had been appointed by the socialist Sydney Webb, who was briefly Secretary of State for the Colonies in the Labour minority government of 1929-31. He appointed Commissioners who he knew shared his desire for an equitable and socialist British Empire and they in turn came up with a constitutional arrangement for Sri Lanka, which would ensure that every community in the island had a chance of for power and prosperity.
