= 1936 Ceylonese State Council election =

2nd Ceylonese State Council election
← 1931	22 February 1936 – 7 March 1936	1947 →

50 seats to the State Council of Ceylon 26 seats were needed for a majority

The second election to the State Council of Ceylon was held from 22 February to 7 March 1936.

== Background ==
The first State Council was dissolved on 7 December 1935 and candidate nominations took place on 15 January 1936. Seven constituencies only had a single nomination each and consequently the candidates were elected without a vote. Elections in the remaining 41 constituencies took place between 22 February and 7 March 1936.
