= 1931 Ceylonese State Council election =

Election held in Ceylon

1st Ceylonese State Council election
- 13–20 June 1931

50 seats to the State Council of Ceylon 26 seats were needed for a majority

The first election to the State Council of Ceylon were held from 13 to 20 June 1931. This was the first election in a British colony which used universal adult franchise.

== Background ==
In 1931 the Donoughmore Constitution replaced the Legislative Council of Ceylon with the State Council of Ceylon as the legislature of British Ceylon. The State Council was to consist of 58 members of which 50 would be elected by universal suffrage and the remaining 8 members appointed the Governor. The new constitution was approved by a majority only 2 votes in the Legislative Council, with the majority of the minority groups' representation voting against it.

The old Legislative Council was dissolved on 17 April 1931 and candidate nominations took place on 4 May 1931. The Jaffna Youth Congress, an organisation that campaigned for Ceylon independence, called for a boycott of the election since the Donoughmore Constitution did not grant dominion status to Ceylon. Consequently, no nominations were received in four constituencies in the north of the country (Jaffna, Kankesanthurai, Kayts and Point Pedro). In addition, nine other constituencies only had a single nomination each and consequently the candidates were elected without a vote. Elections in the remaining 37 constituencies took place between 13 and 20 June 1931. The election system was carried out with voters selecting coloured boxes rather than ballot papers for the benefit of those Ceylonese who were illiterate. Standing candidates selected a colour and a symbol to represent them. The candidates' wives and female supporters would often wear their candidates' chosen colour in their everyday dress in the run up to the election.

In 1934 by-elections were held for the four vacant seats in the north.
