= State Council of Ceylon =

Legislative body of Ceylon (present-day Sri Lanka) from 1931 to 1948

- British Ceylon

Type
- Type: Unicameral

History
- Established: 1931
- Disbanded: 1947
- Preceded by: Legislative Council of Ceylon
- Succeeded by: Parliament of Ceylon
- Seats: 58

Elections
- Last election: 1936 Ceylonese State Council election

Meeting place
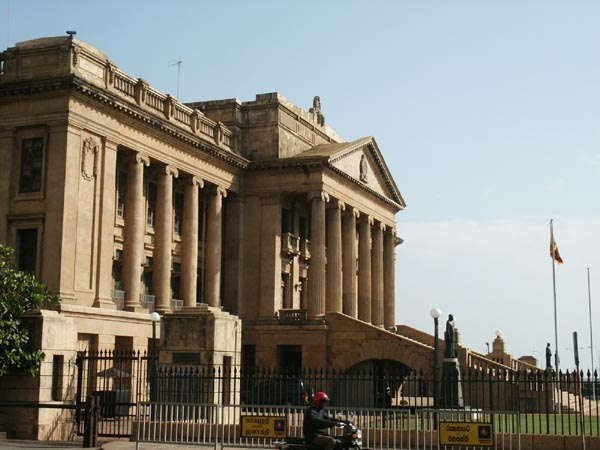
- The State Council building in Galle Face Green, Colombo. The building was used by the State Council's successors (the House of Representatives of Ceylon, National State Assembly, and Parliament of Sri Lanka) until 1982. Today it is known as the Old Parliament Building and houses the Presidential Secretariat.

The State Council of Ceylon was the unicameral legislature for Ceylon (now Sri Lanka), established in 1931 by the Donoughmore Constitution. The State Council gave universal adult franchise to the people of the colony for the first time. It replaced the Legislative Council of Ceylon, the colony's original legislative body.

There were only two State Councils: the First, elected in 1931, and the Second, elected in 1936. The 1947 Soulbury Constitution replaced the State Council with the Parliament of Ceylon, as part of a process of constitutional development leading up to independence, which took place on 4 February 1948.

== History ==
Due to Ceylonese demands for constitutional reform, a royal commission was established by the British authorities under the chairmanship of the Earl of Donoughmore. The Donoughmore Commission arrived in the colony in 1927, before returning to the United Kingdom where it issued its report. The Commission proposed reforms which were implemented as the so-called Donoughmore Constitution, resulting in the abolition of the Legislative Council of Ceylon as the colony's legislature, and its replacement by a "State Council" in 1931.

The structure and working of the State Council was experimental, and was based in part on the United Kingdom's London County Council. The State Council functioned in both an executive and legislative capacity, with seven committees performing executive duties. Each committee consisted of designated members of the State Council, and was chaired by an elected Ceylonese who was addressed as minister. The Ceylonese ministers formed a board of ministers with three British officials of ministerial rank who handled defence, external affairs, finance, and judicial matters.

The Donoughmore Constitution was not considered a great success, and this combined with Ceylonese demands for further constitutional reform led to a new commission being established, under the chairmanship of Herwald Ramsbotham, 1st Viscount Soulbury, which arrived in Ceylon in 1944. Based on the report by the Soulbury Commission, a new constitution was created, by which the State Council was replaced by a Parliament, elections for which were conducted in 1947. Negotiations with Ceylon's newly elected government resulted in the British granting Ceylon independence as a dominion in 1948.

== Membership ==
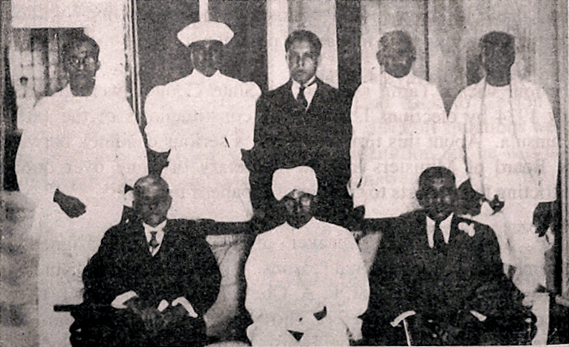
Ministers of the Second State Council of Ceylon with the Speaker in 1936

The State Council consisted of 58 members, of whom 50 were elected by universal suffrage, and 8 appointed by the Governor.

=== Speakers of the State Council ===
- Alfred Francis Molamure (1931–34)
- Sir Forester Augustus Obeysekera (1934–35)
- Sir Waitialingm Duraiswamy (1936–47)

=== Officers of State ===
- Chief Secretary of Ceylon
- Legal Secretary of Ceylon
- Financial Secretary of Ceylon

=== Leaders of the House ===
- Sir Don Baron Jayatilaka (1931–42)
- Don Stephen Senanayake (1942–47)

=== Ministers of the State Council ===
- First Board of Ministers of Ceylon (1931–35)
- Second Board of Ministers of Ceylon (1936–47)

=== Clerk of the State Council ===
The Clerk of the State Council was the senior administrative officer of council and an apolitical civil servant.

- G. N. Farquhar, MC, CCS (1930–1932)
- V. Coomaraswamy, CCS (1932–1933)
- E. W. Kannangara, CCS (1933–1940)
- D. C. R. Gunawardana, CCS (1940–1947)
- R. St. L. P. Deraniyagala, CBE (1947)

=== Members of the State Council ===
- Members of the 1st State Council of Ceylon
- Members of the 2nd State Council of Ceylon
