= Ponnambalam–Coomaraswamy family =

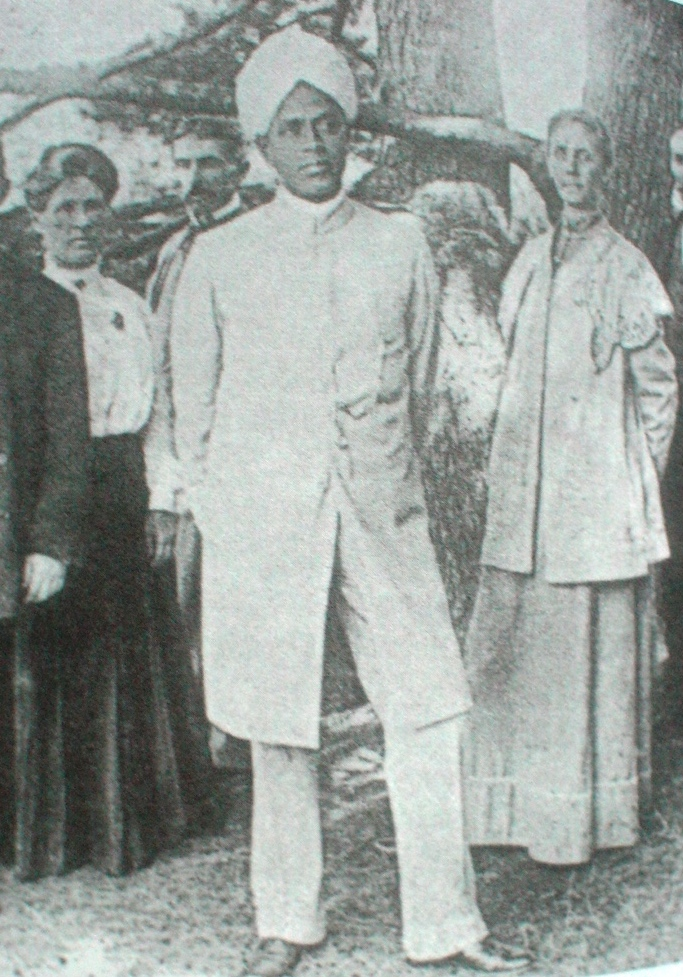
Ponnanbalam Ramanathan in 1906 with his future second wife Ms. Harrison (right). Several members of the family were married to western women.

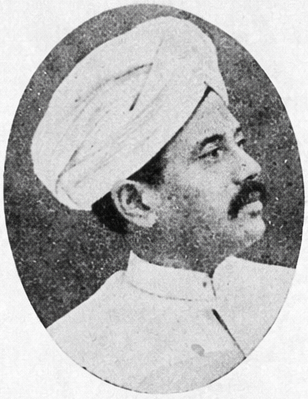
Ponnambalam Arunachalam

The Ponnambalam–Coomaraswamy family (Tamil: பொன்னம்பலம் குமாரசுவாமி குடும்பம்) is a Sri Lankan Tamil Hindu family that was prominent in politics in former British Ceylon and later Sri Lanka from the colonial era to 1972. Many members received imperial honours such as knighthood by the British Crown.

== History ==
The Ponnambalam–Coomaraswamy family are mainly from Manipay, Jaffna and were of the Sri Lankan Vellalar caste. They have been politically active since 18th century, with many having posts such as Mudaliyars, a title for Ceylonese officials used under the Colony governments of Ceylon.

Arumuganathapillai Coomaraswamy, one of the earliest known member of the family was a Gate Mudaliyar, second highest Mudaliyar position. Arumuganathapillai rendered service to the British under the Kandyan Wars, in their attempt to gain control over the Kandy Kingdom.

The family have also made noteworthy contributions. Ponnambalam Ramanathan founded the Parameshwara College, which was later used by Sri Lankan government to establish the University of Jaffna. Sri Ponnambalam Vaneswarar Temple located in Colombo is also credited to be founded by the family. Sri Kurinji Easware temple is a temple located in Kodaikanal, Tamil Nadu is credited to have been built by a European woman, Leelawathy Ramanathan, the wife of Ponnambalam Ramanathan.

Furthermore, some of the family members have made contributions to literature. Ananda Coomaraswamy was a metaphysician and aesthetician, who widely contributed to bringing Indian art to the Western world and has contributed with many books on traditional Indian and Sinhalese art.

== Notable members of the family ==
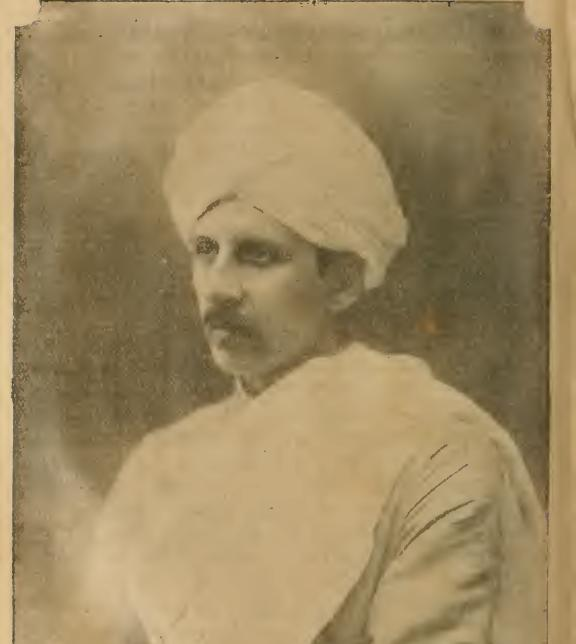
Photo of Ananda Coomaraswamy, who was born to Muthu Coomaraswamy and British Elizabeth Clay Beebe.

- Arumugampillai Coomaraswamy (1783-1836), Gate Mudaliyar, Member of Legislative Council
  - Sir Muthu Coomaraswamy CCS FRGS (1833-1879), Member of Legislative Council + Elizabeth Clay Beebe
    - Ananda Coomaraswamy (1877-1947)
      - Narada Coomaraswamy
  - Sellachchi Coomaraswamy + Arunachalam Ponnambalam (1814-1887), Mudaliyar of the Governor's Gate
    - P. Coomaraswamy (1849-1906), Member of Legislative Council
    - Sir Ponnambalam Ramanathan KCMG QC (1851-1930), Solicitor General of British Ceylon, Member of Legislative Council + Leelawathy Ramanathan (1870-1953)
      - Sivagamasundari + S. Natesan, Member of Parliament, Member of State Council, Senator
    - Sir Ponnambalam Arunachalam KCMG CCS (1853-1924), Member of Executive Council, Member of Legislative Council + Swarnambal Namasivayam
      - Arunachalam Padmanabha
      - Sir Arunachalam Mahadeva KCMG (1888-1969), Government Minister, Member of Legislative Council, Member of State Council, High Commissioner to India
        - Balakumar Baku Mahadeva
          - Kumar Mahadeva, founder of global tech giant Cognizant.
      - Arunachalam Ramanathan
      - Pathmavathy Arunachalam + Sir S. Pararajasingam, Senator
        - Pararajasingham Nadesan
        - Lalithambikai (-2005) + M. Swaminathan
          - D. M. Swaminathan (1945-), Member of Parliament, Governor of Western Province

== See also ==
- List of political families in Sri Lanka
