= Kumaraswamy =

Kumaraswamy குமாரசுவாமி குமரசாமி ಕುಮಾರಸ್ವಾಮಿ കുമാരസാമി
- Pronunciation: Kumāracuvāmi
- Gender: Male
- Language: Tamil; Kannada; Malayalam

Origin
- Meaning: Bachelor God
- Region of origin: Southern India; North-eastern Sri Lanka

Other names
- Alternative spelling: Coomarasamy; Coomaraswamy; Kumarasamy
- Derived: Murugan

Kumaraswamy or Coomaraswamy or Kumarasamy (Tamil: குமாரசுவாமி; Kannada: ಕುಮಾರಸ್ವಾಮಿ) is a South Indian male given name. Due to the South Indian tradition of using patronymic surnames it may also be a surname for males and females. Kumaraswamy is one of the many names of the Hindu god Murugan.

== Notable people ==
=== Given name ===
- Arumugampillai Coomaraswamy (1783–1836), Ceylonese politician
- C. Coomaraswamy (1887–?), Ceylonese civil servant and diplomat
- D. Kumaraswamy (1906–1972), Indonesian community leader
- H. D. Kumaraswamy (born 1957), Indian politician
- K. N. Kumarasamy Gounder, Indian politician
- Kumaraswamy Pulavar (1854–1922), Ceylonese scholar and poet
- Palaniyappa Gounder Kumarasamy, Indian politician
- Poondi Kumaraswamy (1930–1988) Indian hydrologist
- P. Coomaraswamy (1849–1906), Ceylonese lawyer and politician
- P. S. Kumaraswamy Raja (1898–1957), Indian politician
- P. T. Kumarasamy Chetty, Indian politician and businessman
- S. Kumarasamy, Indian politician and social worker
- S. V. Kumaraswamy (1918–?), Indian cricket official
- V. Coomaraswamy (1892–1972), Ceylonese civil servant and diplomat
- V. Kumaraswamy, Ceylonese lawyer and politician

=== Surname ===
- Ananda Coomaraswamy (1877–1947), Ceylonese historian and art philosopher
- Coomarasamy Balasingham (1917–2001), Ceylonese civil servant
- Coomaraswamy Vanniasingam (1911–1959), Ceylonese politician
- Indrajit Coomaraswamy (born 1950), Sri Lankan economist
- James Coomarasamy, British broadcaster
- Kumarasami Kamaraj (1903–1975), Indian politician
- Kumaraswamy Nandagopan (1976–2008), Sri Lankan paramilitary operative
- Muthu Coomaraswamy (1833–1879), Ceylonese politician, father of Ananda Coomaraswamy
- Punch Coomaraswamy (1925–1999), Singaporean judge and diplomat
- Radhika Coomaraswamy (born 1953), Sri Lankan lawyer
- Rajendra Coomaraswamy (1915–1981), Sri Lankan civil servant
- Satyendra Coomaraswamy (1920–1988), Sri Lankan cricketer
