= Childhood nudity =

Scientific and cultural information about nudity of human children

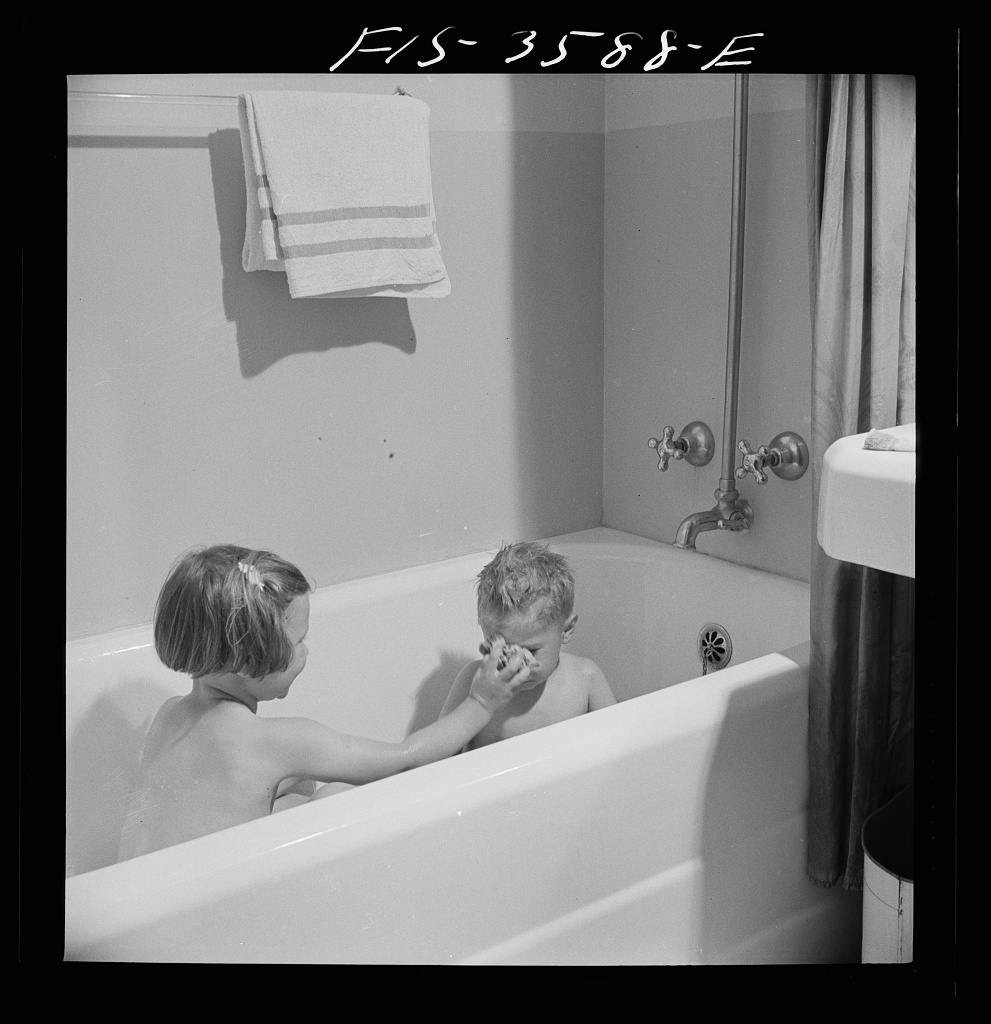
Siblings bathing together, Greenbelt, Maryland (1942)

Childhood nudity is the state of being in which a prepubescent human is without clothing or not clothed according to social norms. Very young children, not having learned such norms, and having no modesty, may remove their clothing seeking comfort or as part of play. In contemporary societies, attitudes toward children being unclothed in various situations are controversial and greatly differ worldwide depending upon conceptions of childhood innocence and child sexuality. Societies may regard public childhood nudity before puberty as normal, as acceptable in particular situations such as same-sex groups, or unacceptable.

Until approximately 12,000 years ago, all humans were hunter-gatherers living in close contact with their natural surroundings and naked most of the time. In prehistoric pastoral societies in warmer climates, such as the ancient civilizations of the Mediterranean Basin, adults were often minimally clothed or naked while working and children often did not wear clothes until puberty.

Until the final decades of the 20th century, the nudity of all toddlers and prepubescent boys was generally viewed as innocent and non-sexual. Since the 1980s, there has been a shift in attitudes by those who associate nudity with the threat of child sexual abuse and exploitation, which has been described by some as a moral panic. Other societies continue to maintain that openness and freedom are needed for healthy child development, allowing children to be nude without shame in safe environments.

== Stages of human development ==
The American Academy of Pediatrics recommends that parents and caregivers learn to understand that a child's explorations of their own and others' bodies are motivated by curiosity, not adult sexuality. A report issued in 2009 on child sexual development in the United States by the National Child Traumatic Stress Network addressed the questions parents have about what to expect regarding their children being clothed as they grow up. Preschool children have a natural curiosity about their own bodies and the bodies of others, and little modesty in their behaviors. The report recommended that parents learn what is normal in regard to nudity and sexuality at each stage of a child's development and refrain from overreacting to their children's nudity-related behaviors unless there are signs of a problem (e.g. anxiety, aggression, or sexual interactions between children not of the same age or stage of development). The general advice for non-family caregivers is to find ways of setting boundaries without giving the child a sense of shame.

=== Early childhood ===
Sexual development begins in infancy, along with physical and cognitive abilities. Preschool children have little sense of modesty, and will seek bodily comfort by removing their clothes and touching themselves. They are curious about the difference between boys and girls, and learn mainly by sight and touch; wanting to see and touch the bodies of others their own age. They usually learn the difference between boys and girls, including themselves, by the age of three or four. Preschool children have little understanding of the effects of their behavior on others, and seeking comfort, may remove their clothes. As their language use grows, they will use words they have heard (either euphemistic or accurate) for body parts and functions. At age four to six they will ask questions about bodily functions, seek to see other people when they are naked, and explore the bodies of others their own age.

Normal play includes behaviors such as playing doctor and other sexual games, including looking at or briefly touching other children's genitals, sexual talk and jokes, and masturbation. Normal sexual behavior at this age is exploratory, spontaneous and infrequent. It is voluntary, none of the children being upset. The behavior is easily diverted when privacy rules are explained. These behaviors occur occasionally between peers or siblings who are of similar age, size, and level of development. Caregivers must determine when behavior becomes problematic and requires intervention. In some families any sexual behavior, such as masturbation, may be seen as problematic or unacceptable, even though the behavior is generally viewed as normal by child behavior specialists.

=== Late childhood and adolescence ===
Between the ages of 7 and 12, children may prefer to be alone for dressing and undressing, although there are differences in norms regarding family nudity. There may be social difficulties depending upon individual differences in sexual development of children of the same age, in particular the beginning of puberty. Children's understanding of these changes depends on correct information and educational materials being provided as they grow. Parents may be uncomfortable providing such information, and their children may turn to inaccurate information and values contained in movies, television, and the internet.

Children tend to have friends of the same sex until early adolescence. They may participate in sex play that is motivated by curiosity, and does not reflect upon sexual orientation. Parents may respond to such behavior by providing age-appropriate guidance regarding social rules.

Puberty begins between the ages 7 and 12, generally a year later for boys than for girls. Although an adult-level capacity for logical thinking may be reached by 16, psychosocial maturity, the ability to make decisions under stress or emotions may not occur until after 18, creating a maturity gap. Sexual behaviors between adolescents of the same age are generally considered normal by professionals if it does not involve coercion or purely sexual motivation. Otherwise, appropriateness of sexual behavior depends upon family and cultural traditions regarding physical expression of affection, privacy accorded to children, and openness about sexuality.

== Sex education ==
The health textbooks in Finnish secondary schools emphasize the normalcy of non-sexual nudity in saunas and gyms as well as openness to the appropriate expression of developing sexuality. The Netherlands also has open and comprehensive sex education beginning as early as age 4. In addition to good health outcomes, the program promoted gender equality. Dutch-illustrated books for children depict naked bodies when appropriate.

In general, the United States remains uniquely puritanical in its moral judgements compared to other Western, developed nations. A survey in 2026 found that 40% of young adults had not received any sex education, while only 15% received comprehensive sex education. The others were in programs that emphasized abstinence. A 2009 report issued by the CDC comparing the sexual health of teens in France, Germany, the Netherlands and the United States concluded that if the US implemented comprehensive sex education similar to the three European countries there would be a significant reduction in teen pregnancies, abortions and the rate of sexually transmitted diseases, saving hundreds of millions of dollars.

== Religion ==
=== Islam ===
In Islamic law, the major legal traditions outline specific age thresholds and conditions regarding when adults may view or touch a child's private parts ('awrah).

Within Sunni jurisprudence, the Hanbali school permits touching or looking at the body of a child under seven years of age, restricting views of a male child's private parts between ages seven and nine and prohibiting non-relatives from viewing a female child over seven. The Hanafi school allows adults to view any part of a male child up to age four, after which viewing the private parts is forbidden until sexual maturity brings full adult modesty rules. The Maliki school permits a woman to look at and touch a boy under eight and look at him until age twelve, whereas a man may look at and touch a female child under two years and eight months, and look at her without touching until age four. For the Shafi'i school, an adolescent boy is subject to adult rules, while a younger boy is exempt only if he lacks sexual discernment; once a boy can understand and describe what he sees with sexual awareness, adult modesty rules apply to him. For a young girl, if she has developed physical maturity, she is treated under adult regulations; otherwise, viewing her private parts is restricted to her caregivers.

In Imami jurisprudence, viewing a child's private parts is permissible up to five or six years of age. Across all schools, viewing any child with sexual interest remains strictly prohibited regardless of age.

== Cultural differences ==
Visual anthropologist David MacDougall states that "the sense of shock at seeing children naked seems to be mainly a recent phenomenon" in Western cultures.

In tropical regions of Africa, the Americas, Asia, and Oceania, casual nudity existed as a social norm until the colonial era. Many Indigenous peoples with little or no contact with outsiders continue to practice traditional dress, including nudity. In contemporary rural villages of Sub-Saharan Africa, prepubescent boys and girls play together nude and women bare their breasts in cultures that do not associate nudity with sexuality.

=== England ===
Despite the prudery of Victorian society in Britain, child nudity was accepted as natural in many contexts. Children frequently played unclothed in nurseries, and unclothed children appeared regularly in fine art and commercial advertisements. The British view of childhood as innocent did not extend to America during the same period. In 1891 an American visiting England wrote to a travel columnist that he could not bring his young daughter to the beach without their being surrounded by naked boys. The columnist replied that Englishmen have no problem with their daughters playing with naked boys to the age of ten, but draw a line at fifteen.

Early 20th Century England
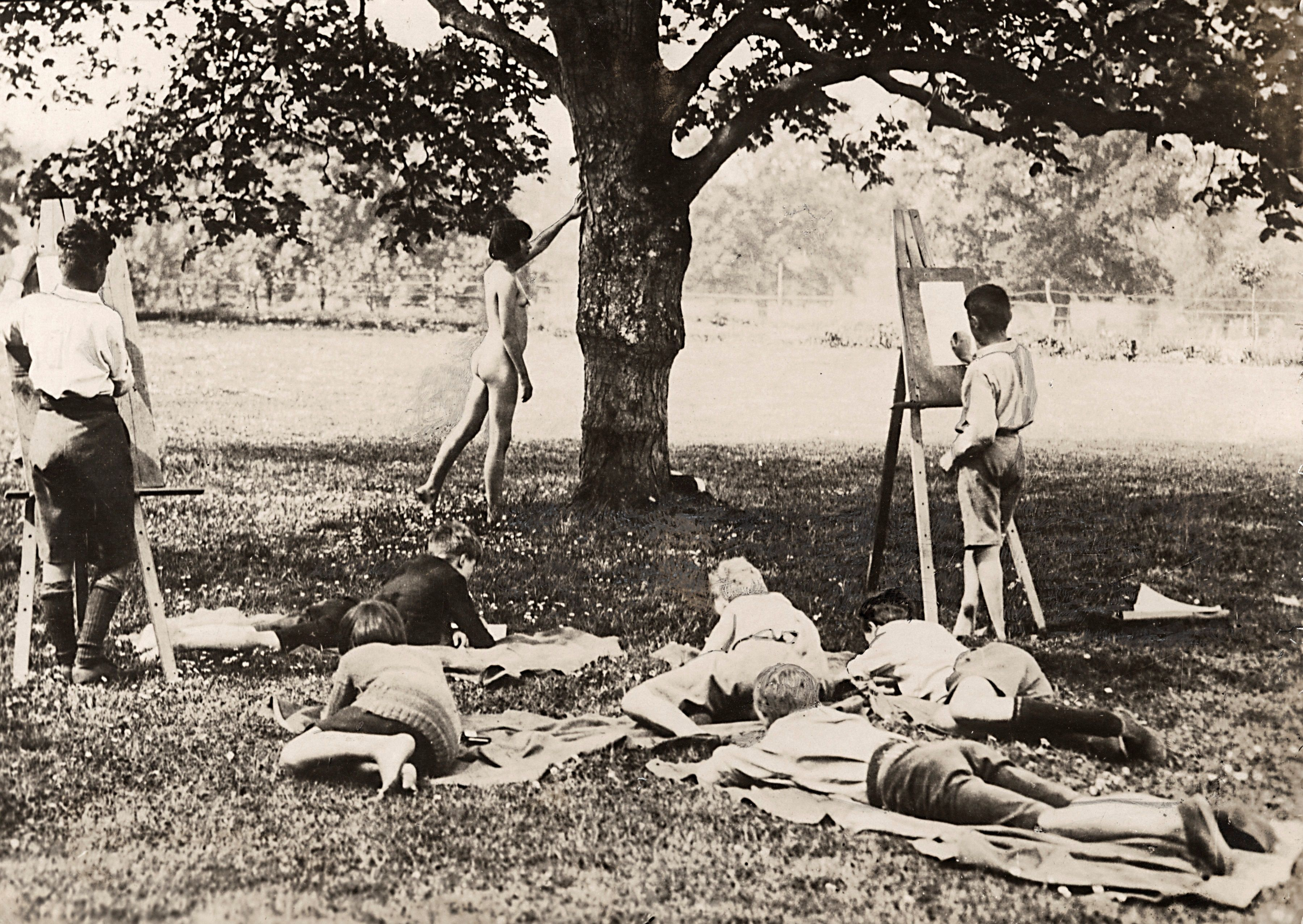
Drawing hour at a school in Suffolk, England (c. 1925)

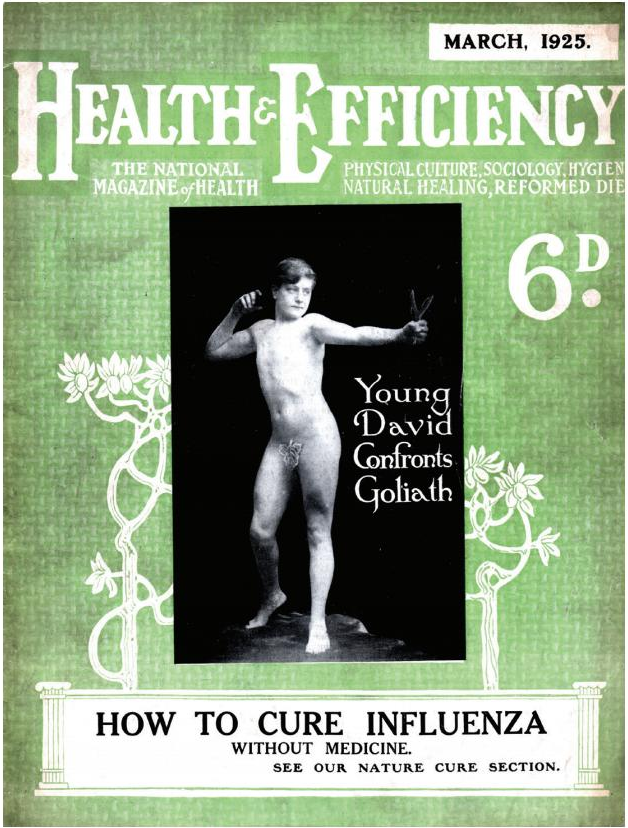
Children were featured in British nudist magazines during the interwar period

In England during the interwar period (1918–1939), a number of schools were established which practiced an educational program that included coeducation and nudity while playing sports or sunbathing. Children were often on the cover of nudist magazines because nude adults could not be displayed on newsstands.

A 1940s film is of an outing for Scouts and Girl Guides in which boys to the age of about ten play nude in a small river, while older boys and all girls are dressed.

=== France ===
Tous à Poil! (Everybody Gets Naked!), a French picture book for children, was first published in 2011 with the stated purpose of presenting a view of nudity in opposition to media images of the ideal body but instead depicting ordinary people swimming naked in the sea including a teacher and a policeman. Attempts by the Union for a Popular Movement to exclude the book from schools prompted French booksellers and librarians to hold a nude protest in support of the book's viewpoint.

=== Israel ===
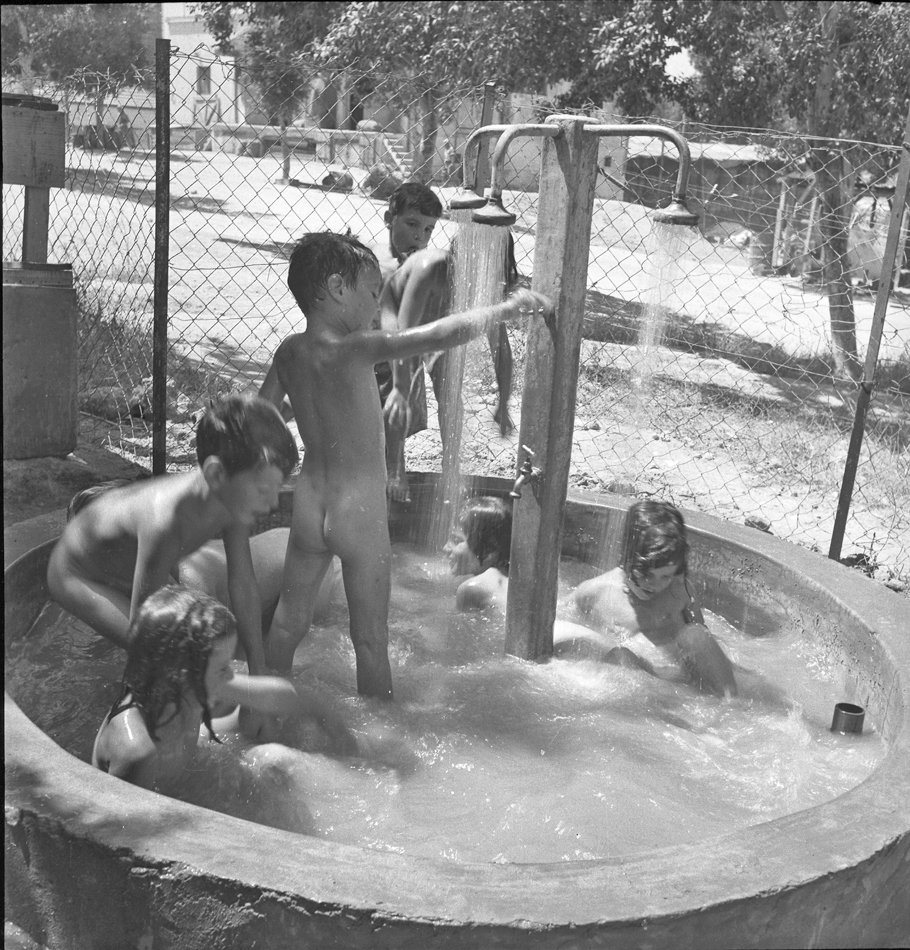
Children at Givat Brenner Kibbutz, Israel (c.1950)

Israeli kibbutzim pursued a program to create a society which included social and gender equality. In some, unrelated boys and girls lived in dormitories and showered together.

=== Japan ===
In Japanese culture, bathing is for relaxation and purification as well as cleanliness, and is part of both Shintoism and Buddhism. Purification in the bath is not only for the body, but the heart or spirit (kokoro). Traditionally, the concept of indecent exposure did not exist, so all ages and genders bathed together. Some public baths may offer gender segregation, but the option of mixed bathing continues.

In the Tokugawa period in Japan (1603–1868), entire communities, men, women, boys and girls, frequented public bathhouses where they were unclothed together. Public baths (sentō) were once common, but became less so with the addition of bathtubs in homes. Some parents in contemporary Japan continue to bathe with children up to adolescence without regard to gender.

=== Netherlands ===
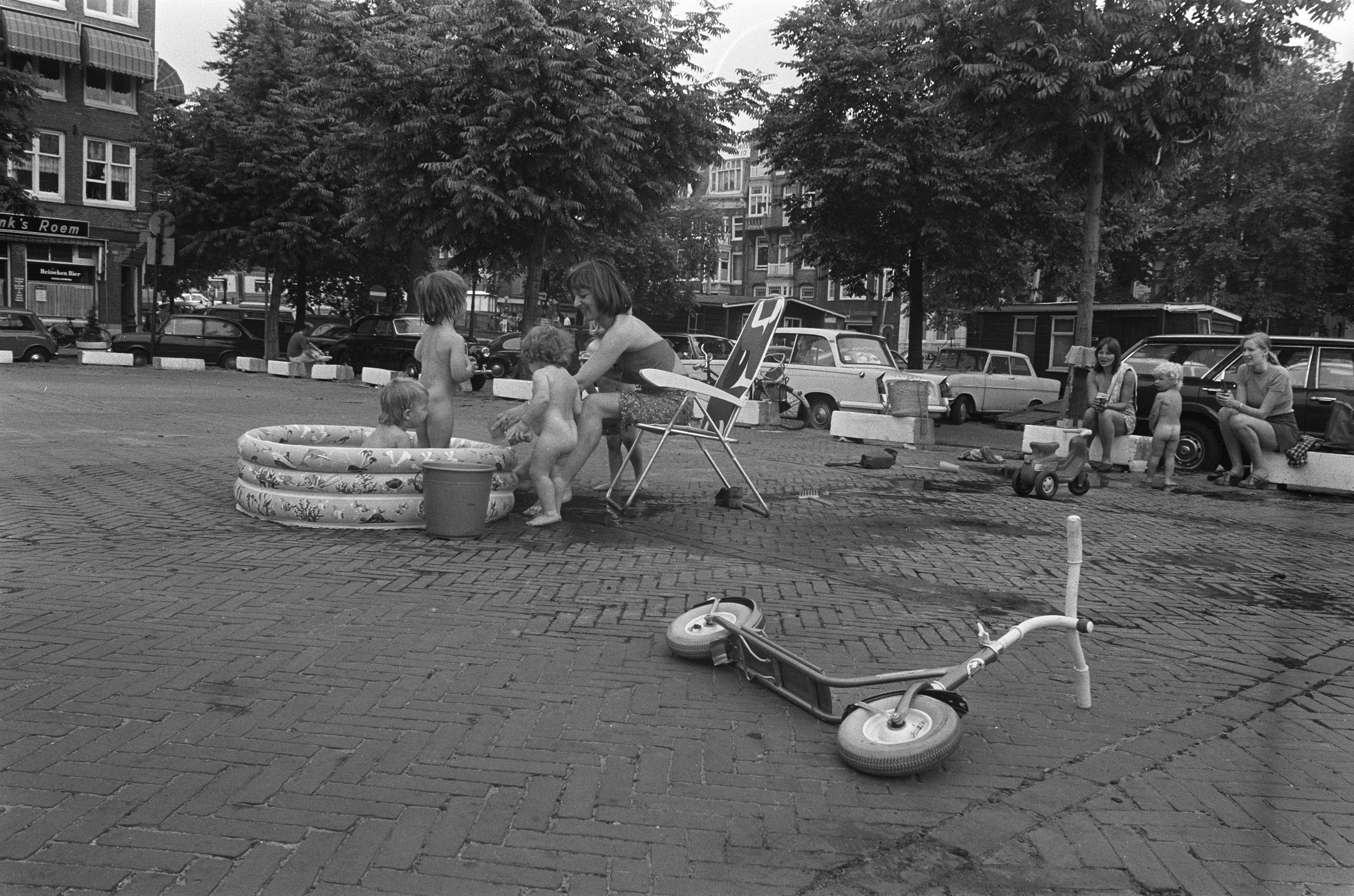
Mothers with children in Amsterdam (1973)

American writer Bonnie Rough lived in Amsterdam and the US while raising her children, and learned that Dutch families typically experienced mixed gender family nudity growing up. Young children in the Netherlands often play outdoors or in public wading pools nude. While this continues, parents must now be more vigilant of strangers taking pictures.

=== New Zealand ===
In New Zealand, daycare school staff confront different points of view between those that think children are sexual in age-appropriate ways that begin before puberty, versus those that think children are asexual until puberty. In the former view, behavior involving genitals may be seen as normal play; the latter view, any childhood sexuality is seen as a sign of abuse, which may include labeling one child as an abuser.

A school in New Zealand decided in 2008 that it was safer for five-year-old students to change poolside rather than use the crowded changing room at a public aquatic center. After two weeks, the practice was abandoned due to complaints made by other users.

=== Nigeria ===
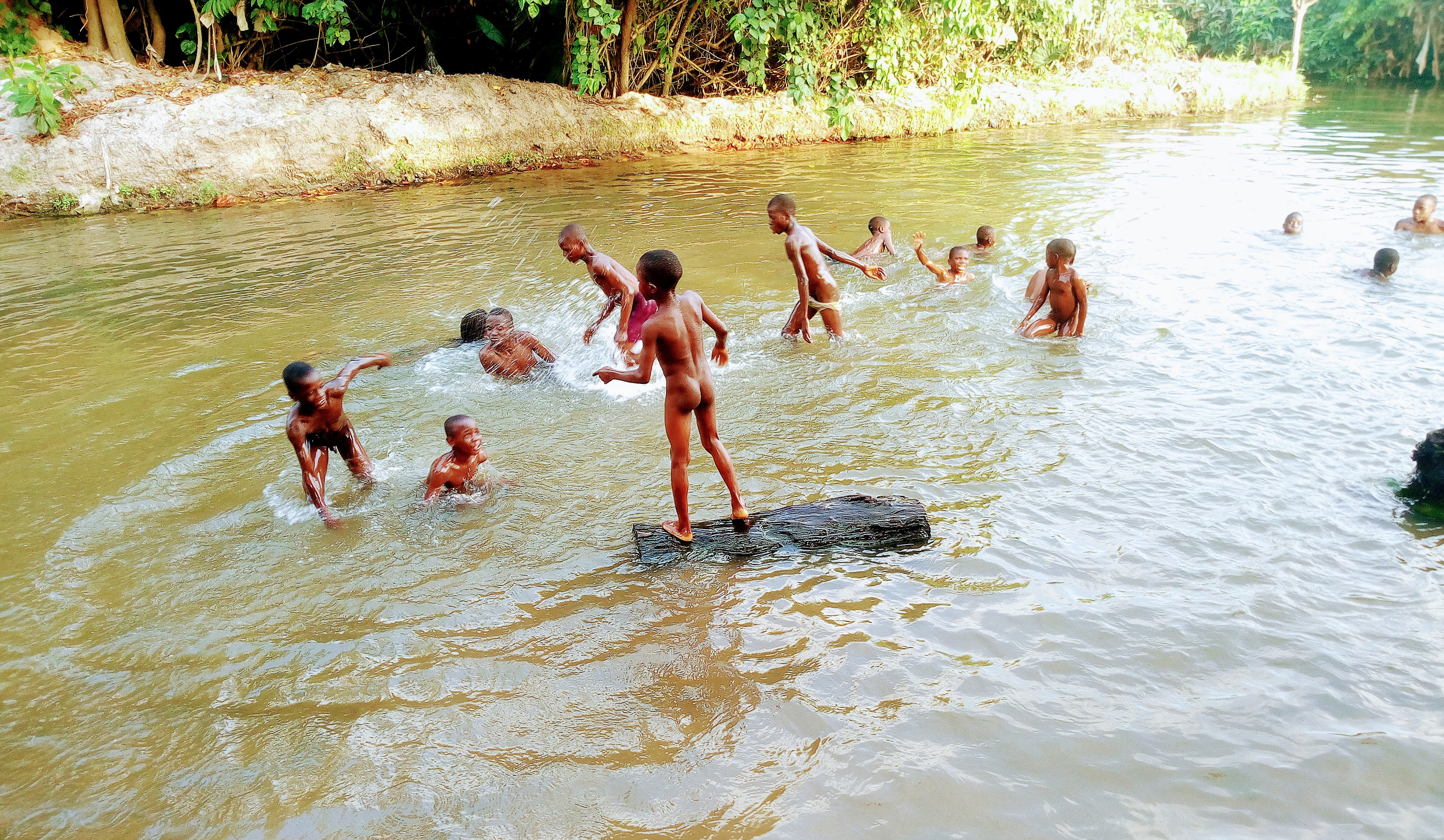
Children swimming in the creeks of Ikorodu, Lagos, Nigeria (2019)

In Lagos, Nigeria, some parents continue to allow children to play naked before puberty. Some express fears about pedophiles and strangers taking photographs, but parents typically want their children to have the same freedom as their own childhood and grow up with a positive body image.

=== Nordic countries ===
==== Denmark ====
A 2020 episode of a Danish TV show for children presented five nude adults to an audience of 11–13-year-olds with the lesson "normal bodies look like this" to counter social media images of perfect bodies.

==== Finland ====
Children by a water basin in the courtyard of housing in Helsinki, Finland (1969)

Professor of Child Psychiatry Jari Sikkonen notes that visitors may wonder at the liberal attitudes towards nudity, but Finns have seen naked children and adults often from infancy in the sauna, and do not associate such nudity with sex.

==== Norway ====
As part of a science program on Norwegian public television (NRK), a series on puberty intended for 8–12-year-olds included explicit information and images of reproduction, anatomy, and the changes that occur with the approach of puberty. Rather than diagrams or photos, the videos were shot in a locker room with live nude people of various ages. The presenter, a physician, is relaxed about close examination and touching of relevant body parts, including genitals. While the videos note that the age of consent in Norway is 16, abstinence is not emphasized. In a subsequent series for teens and young adults, real people were recruited to have sexual intercourse on TV as a counterbalance to the unrealistic presentations in advertising and pornography.

=== United States ===
==== Precolonial and colonial eras ====
Precolonial Native American tribes did not stigmatize or impose any association of sexuality onto childhood nudity. Pocahontas first encountered the English while naked as a child.

The beliefs of early colonists in America varied based upon religion. The Puritans viewed complete nudity, even in private for bathing, as immodest, and limited hygiene to washing the hands, face and regularly changing undergarments. In New England, bathing remained uncommon until the 18th century.

==== Late 19th and early 20th centuries ====
America saw the rise of a subculture of boys and young men who swam nude in any available body of water. Local ordinances often prohibited nude swimming, but they frequently went unenforced or involved very young children who did not receive punishment. In 1907, Nashville, Tennessee deputy sheriffs took no action to stop men and boys from swimming nude in the Cumberland River outside of populated areas. As urbanization in the Northern United States brought this activity into public view, cities and towns responded by constructing swimming pools that continued nude swimming. Outdoor nude swimming in isolated American summer camps also existed as a socially accepted practice usually, but not always, segregated by gender. Farm & Wilderness camps in Plymouth, Vermont were clothing optional from their beginning in 1919 until the late 1980s.

==== Nudity in the home ====
A US survey of 500 mental health and child welfare professionals who were predominantly female, white, and middle-aged indicated that siblings of the same gender bathing together was acceptable to the age of 6 to 8, but of mixed gender only to the age of 5 or 6.

Americans avoid talking about the body and sex with their children, in particular not using real or specific names for body parts and functions. Yet giving children correct vocabulary is part of teaching them how to accurately report if they are touched inappropriately. Also, the basic vocabulary is the starting point for a lifetime of sex education, which cannot wait until adolescence to be learned thoroughly. This is made more difficult since most American parents did not learn these things growing up, so they cannot be role models for appropriate behavior. In the Netherlands, sexual education begins at age 4, but in many US communities, early childhood sex ed is thought to be inappropriate.

In a 2009 article for The New York Times "Home" section, Julie Scelfo interviewed parents regarding the nudity of small children at home in situations which might include visitors outside the immediate household. The situations ranged from a three-year-old being naked at a large gathering, to the use of a backyard swim pool becoming an issue when the children of disapproving neighbors participated. For the parents, such behavior was a natural part of childhood. For others, a child being nude is uncivilized and potentially dangerous due to attracting pedophiles. These differing points of view may create conflict.

Although a serious social issue, the American public often greatly overestimates the prevalence of pedophilia, particularly in conspiracy theories such as Pizzagate and QAnon. This phenomenon has been described by Michael Karger, professor of Justice Studies at Arizona State University, as a moral panic; a social movement against an exaggerated or fabricated threat from individuals or groups believed to undermine the safety and security of society, resulting from restrictive norms surrounding nudity and sexuality.

===== Parent-child nudity =====
In 1995, Gordon and Schroeder contended that "there is nothing inherently wrong with bathing with children or otherwise appearing naked in front of them", noting that doing so may provide an opportunity for parents to provide important information. They noted that by ages five to six, children begin to develop a sense of modesty, and recommended to parents who desire to be sensitive to their children's wishes that they respect a child's modesty from that age onwards. In a 1995 review of the literature, Paul Okami concluded that there was no reliable evidence linking exposure to parental nudity to any negative effect. Three years later, his team finished an 18-year longitudinal study that showed that childhood exposure to nudity was associated with slight beneficial effects in adolescents, with better social and sexual adjustment.

In 1999, psychologist Barbara Bonner recommended against nudity in the home if children exhibit sexual play of a type that is considered problematic. In 2019, psychiatrist Lea Lis recommended that parents allow nudity as a natural part of family life when children are very young, but to respect the modesty that is likely to emerge with puberty.

In an article on family intimacy, sociologist Jacqui Gabb notes that while parents often attribute changes in bathroom privacy and nudity to the child's growing desire for autonomy, this framing often serves to absolve parents of moral responsibility. Gabb argues that the adult–child dynamic remains hierarchical, with boundary changes ultimately dictated by parental decisions and anxieties over public scrutiny.

==== Preschool daycare ====
The normal behavior of very young children may become an issue outside the home. Daycare in Denmark had traditionally been tolerant of nudity and sexuality among preschool children until the beginning of the 21st century, but differences of opinion have arisen with the possibility that not only caregivers but other children may be accused of inappropriate behavior or abuse.

In the 1980s and 1990s, a number of charges were brought against daycare providers, mainly in the US, alleging sexual abuse and satanic rituals, but were rarely sustained; being based upon improper techniques for interviewing children, using leading questions and sometimes coercion to elicit the desired result.

Pedophilia panics in France and the United States were found to be due to sensational media reports and political crusading rather than any increase in molestation incidents, which remain rare. However, the term moral panic should not be used to claim that a social problem is not real, as sometimes occurs.

Researcher Steven Angelides finds that the social movement to address the issue of child sexual abuse has had the unintended consequence of reinforcing a public perception of prepubescent sexuality as nonexistent, which erases the normal sexual development of children.

==== Schools and recreation ====
By the 1990s, communal showers in American schools had become "uncomfortable", not only because students were accustomed to more privacy at home, but because young people became more self-conscious based upon the comparison to mass media images of unrealistic bodies. The trend for privacy is being extended to public schools, colleges and community facilities replacing "gang showers" and open locker rooms with individual stalls and changing rooms. A 2014 study of schools in England found that 53% of boys and 67.5% of girls did not shower after physical education (PE) classes. Other studies indicate that not showering, while often related to being naked with peers, is also related to lower intensity of physical activity and involvement in sports.

The change in privacy also addresses issues of transgender usage and family use when one parent accompanies children of differing gender.

A shift in attitudes has come to societies historically open to nudity. In the Netherlands children up to age 12 used mixed-gender communal showers at school. In the 1980s showering became gender-segregated, but in the 2000s, some shower in a bathing suit. In Denmark, secondary school students are now avoiding showering after gym classes. In interviews, students cited the lack of privacy, fears of being judged by idealized standards, and the possibility of being photographed while naked. Similar results were found in schools in Norway.

==== Communal nudity ====
In their 1986 study on the effects of social nudity on children, Dennis Craig Smith and William Sparks concluded that "the viewing of the unclothed body, far from being destructive to the psyche, seems to be either benign or to actually provide positive benefits to the individuals involved". As recently as 1996 the YMCA maintained a policy of allowing very young children to accompany their parents into the locker room of either gender, which some health care professionals questioned. A contemporary solution has been to provide separate family changing rooms.

=== Naturism ===
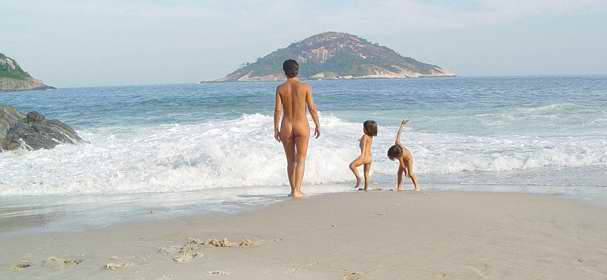
A naturist family visits the beach at Rio de Janeiro

The naturist/nudist point of view is that children are "nudists at heart" and that naturism provides the ideal environment for healthy development. It is noted that modern psychology generally agrees that children can benefit from an open environment where the bodies of others their own age of both sexes are not hidden. However, there is less agreement regarding children and unrelated adults being nude. While some doctors have taken the view that some exposure of children to adult nudity (particularly parental nudity) may be healthy, others—notably Benjamin Spock—disagreed. Spock's view was later attributed to the lingering effect of Freudianism on the medical profession.

Many tend to view naturism as indecent, and possibly a danger to children, based upon the assumption that nudity is always sexual. Naturist organizations have worked to present their own view that naturism is respectable, maintaining rules such as favoring family membership and excluding single men while offering evidence of the benefits in physical and mental health.

== Depictions ==
=== In fine art ===
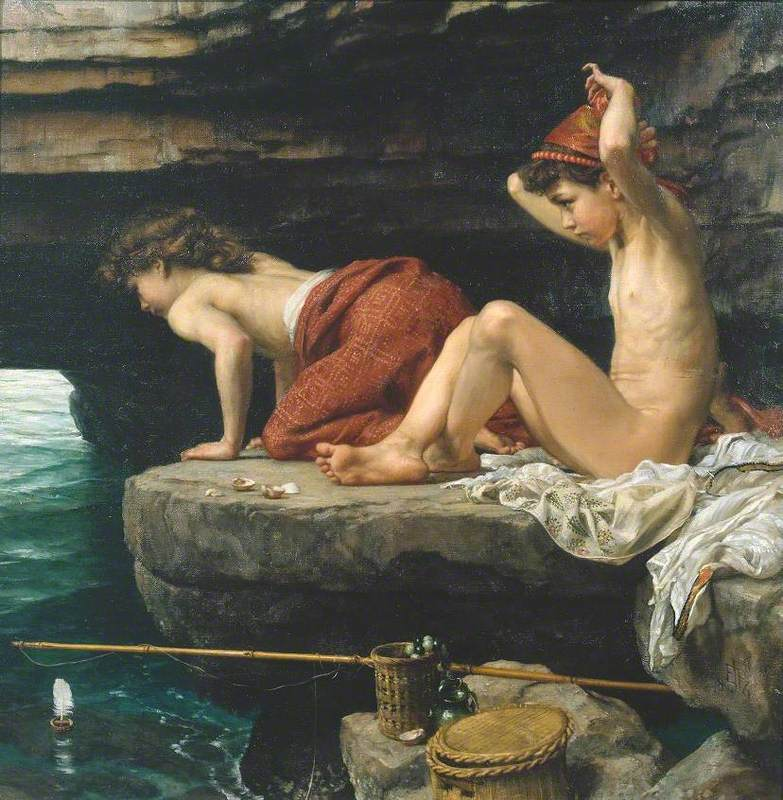
Outward Bound, 1886 by Edward John Poynter

Victorian culture included contradictions, but the nude images of little girls, as in Outward Bound by Edward John Poynter, did not seem to be perceived as a problem, but as naturally innocent. There was a cultural desensitization toward the nude child which largely dismissed the possible association between nudity and sexuality.

In the late 19th and early 20th centuries, impressionist painters depicted everyday life, which included scenes of nude toddlers or older children swimming and playing. John Singer Sargent's painting of Neapolitan Children Bathing was done based upon sketches done while traveling. Mary Cassatt (1844–1926) often painted domestic scenes, in particular mothers and children, the youngest being nude.

Spanish artist Joaquín Sorolla (1863–1923) returned to his hometown of Valencia frequently from 1899 to 1909 to paint beach scenes in the open air. The children of fishermen and other workers swam in the ocean. Girls swam nude to the age of four or five, while boys swam nude until adolescence. Boys and girls talked and played without regard to the difference in clothing, as in Running Along the Beach. An exception is The Bath, Jávea (1905) which Sorolla depicts his own family bathing, including one of his own daughters nude, in a sheltered cove rather than the open beach.

=== In popular media ===
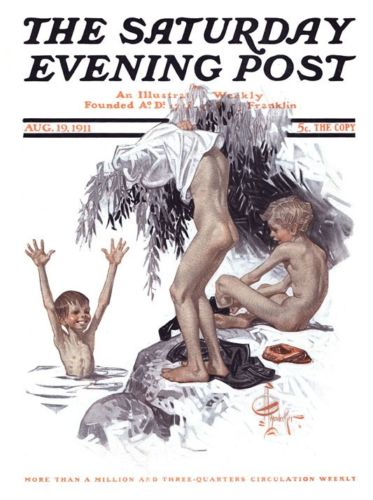
Cover of the Saturday Evening Post (August 19, 1911) by J. C. Leyendecker

Historically, the depiction of nude children in fine art, photography, and soap advertisements symbolized purity and innocence and did not face widespread scrutiny and legal reevaluation until the late 20th century. For example, Life routinely published modestly posed photographs of nude boys to illustrate articles on American life. A photograph of nude boys in a communal shower from a 1941 article on high schools included a caption indicating a perception of male communal nudity as symbolic of social equality.

=== Family photographs ===
For decades, parents have taken and shared photographs of their infants and young children naked, often while bathing. Some contemporary parents see such photos as records of ephemeral childhood innocence that are precious, while others view the practice as an intrusion on private behavior that can rapidly spread online. During the final decades prior to digital photography, labs processing film photographs occasionally reported nude photography of children as possible evidence of child sexual abuse, with some charges being filed, but few sustained. An "unsuitable print policy" existed at Walmart as of 2008, when a couple lost custody of their three children for a month due to some photographs taken of them in a bathtub. A judge deemed the photos as not pornographic, after which the parents sued Walmart for damages, stating that the store's policy was unclear. Walmart prevailed, stating that their policy had been in place for 25 years.

Sally Mann's 1992 book Immediate Family includes nude photographs of her three children under the age of 10. Mann stated that she decided to include every aspect of everyday life on their family farm with her children's consent and advice from experts. She attributes any negative response to the book's publication coinciding with a moral panic over depictions of child nudity, combined with debate over government funding of the arts. Mary Gordon criticized Mann, perceiving her work as sexualizing children despite its artistic merit. Mann responded that any sexual connotations came from the viewer, not the images. In her 2015 memoir Hold Still, Mann recounts that during her own childhood in rural Virginia, she had resisted wearing clothes until the age of five. In 2025, four images from Immediate Family were removed from an exhibit at the Modern Art Museum of Fort Worth, prompted by a letter from The Danbury Institute, a conservative religious organization. A grand jury did not bring charges, but the photographs remained out of the exhibit.

=== Social media ===
Meta policy prohibits nude images of children from its social platforms, citing the possibility of abuse by others. In 2014, Facebook removed a mother's photo of her two-year-old daughter showing her bare bottom, an image intended as a parody of a Coppertone ad from the 1950s. In 2015, photos copied from Facebook appeared on a Russian website frequented by pedophiles, but they included images of clothed children and police found none of them indecent.

=== Childhood exposure to nude images ===
Following a controversy over the inclusion of a photograph of Michelangelo's David in a Florida school lesson, a survey was done of the general population. Seventy-five percent of Americans say they do not find the depiction of nudity in paintings and sculptures by classical artists to be problematic, and only 14% say they do. A smaller majority (55%) agreed when the question was whether children should view nudity in art.

In a 2018 survey of predominantly white middle-class college students in the United States, only 10% of women and 7% of men reported seeing real people as their first childhood experience of nudity. Many were accidental, such as walking in on parents, and were more likely to be remembered as negative by women. A majority of both women (84%) and men (89%) reported seeing their first depictions of nudity in film, video, or other mass media. Only 4.7% of women and 2% of men reported seeing nude images as part of sex education.

=== Pornography ===
Child pornography laws in the United States (18 U.S. Code § 2251) prohibit the depiction of sexually explicit conduct involving any person under 18, although what constitutes "sexually explicit" depends upon interpretation. In the absence of explicit conduct, the determination of whether a particular image violates the laws results from speculation as to the intent of the creator and the response of the viewer. In 2010, Project Spade convicted numerous Americans for possessing child pornography that did not involve sexually explicit conduct, but instead included "lascivious exhibition of the genitals or pubic area" of a minor. The European Union also prohibits images of children that are sexualized.

In recent years, the identification of child sexual abuse material (CSAM) has led to the development of programs that use artificial intelligence to flag images that are then reviewed by humans before further action occurs. The advocacy organization Electronic Frontier Foundation views these programs as a dangerous violation of the integrity of end-to-end encryption, which promotes privacy in online communications.

== See also ==
- History of nudity
