= David Rockwood =

Colonel David Narasiah Rockwood, KStJ, ED, JP (2 February 1914 – 1976) was a Sri Lankan army officer and corporate executive. He was the Deputy Commandant of the Volunteer Force.

Born in to a Tamil family of doctors, his father was Dr David Rockwood and his grandfather was Dr W. G. Rockwood, Member of the Legislative Council of Ceylon. Lieutenant Colonel Dr John Rockwood was his uncle.

Rockwood joined Rowlands Ltd as an executive and went on to become the managing director of the British Car Company Ltd which introduced the Morris Minor in Ceylon.

He joined the Ceylon Defence Force in 1940, and was commissioned a second lieutenant in the 1 Battalion, Ceylon Light Infantry. Mobilized for war service as soon as he joined as a volunteer officer, Rockwood served as a staff officer in the South East Asia Command headquarters in Peradeniya. Thereafter he was appointed as second in command of the 4th Battalion, Ceylon Light Infantry based at Monkey Bridge, Trincomalee. He remained with the Ceylon Volunteer Force and was attached to the 2nd (Volunteer) Battalion, Ceylon Light Infantry. He received the battalion's Colours in 1954 from Queen Elizabeth II during her Royal tour of Ceylon. He served a period on secondment with the Durham Light Infantry and was presented to Field Marshal Viscount Slim. He was appointed the first Inspector Training of the Ceylon Volunteer Force. Promoted to lieutenant colonel, Rockwood served as the commanding officer, 2nd (Volunteer) Battalion, Ceylon Light Infantry from March 1959 to May 1963. Promoted to colonel, he served as the Deputy Commandant of the Volunteer Force from 1963 to 1964. Rockwood had received the Efficiency Decoration, the Defence Medal, the War Medal 1939–1945, Queen Elizabeth II Coronation Medal and the Ceylon Armed Services Inauguration Medal.

He was a Justice of the peace, Commissioner for the East in the St. John Ambulance Brigade and was made a Knight of Grace of the Order of Saint John. He served as the Scout Commissioner, the Vice President of the Society of Arts and in the Board of Governors of the School for the Deaf and Blind.

He married Sarasvathi Kasinathan, they had four children. His son Gabriel Mohan Rockwood retired as a brigadier in the Sri Lanka Army.

== See also ==
- S. D. Ratwatte
