= Kumarasamy (disambiguation) =

Kumarasamy or Kumarasami is a given name for a male South Indians. It may also refer to:

- Nalan Kumarasamy, Tamil film director
- MKCE, M. Kumarasamy College of Engineering in Tamil Nadhu

== See also ==
- Kumaraswamy (disambiguation)
- Coomaraswamy (disambiguation)
