= Kanagasabai =

Kanagasabai கனகசபை
- Pronunciation: Kaṉakacapai
- Gender: Male
- Language: Tamil

Origin
- Region of origin: Southern India; North-eastern Sri Lanka

Other names
- Alternative spelling: Canagasabai; Canagasabey; Kanagasaby; Khanagasabai

Kanagasabai (Tamil: கனகசபை) is a Tamil male given name. Due to the Tamil tradition of using patronymic surnames it may also be a surname for males and females.

Kanagasabai is the Tamil name of the court in the temple of the Hindu god Shiva in Chidambaram in the state of Tamil Nadu, India. In this temple the main idol is in the dancing form, which is usually called Nataraja. Kanagasabai is a combination of two Tamil words, kanagam meaning gold and sabai meaning court. Since the idol is believed to be performing Bharathanatyam, one of the traditional Indian dance forms, in the court made of gold, the court is called Kanagasabai. The Chidambaram Temple also has a traditional name of Kanagasabai.

== Notable people ==
=== Given name ===
- A. Kanagasabai (1856–1927), Ceylonese lawyer
- R. Kanagasabai Pillai, Indian politician

=== Surname ===
- Canagasabai Kunalan (born 1942), Singaporean athlete
- Dhiloraj Canagasabey (born 1955), Sri Lankan priest
- Kanagasabai Ganeshalingam (1938–2006), Sri Lankan politician
- Kanagasabai Pathmanathan (1948–2009), Sri Lankan politician
- Thanmanpillai Kanagasabai (born 1939), Sri Lankan politician
