= Kumaraswamy (disambiguation) =

Kumaraswamy or Kumaraswami is an Indian male given name. It may also refer to:

- Murugan, also called Kumaraswami or Kartikeya, the Hindu god of war
- Kumaraswamy distribution, a distribution form related to probability theory and statistics
- Kumaraswamy Layout, a residential locality in southern Bangalore, India

== See also ==
- Coomaraswamy (disambiguation)
- Kumarasamy (disambiguation)
- Kumaraswamy ministry (disambiguation)
