= Sri Arulparananda Swamigal =

19th-century Tamil diplomat, linguist, and guru

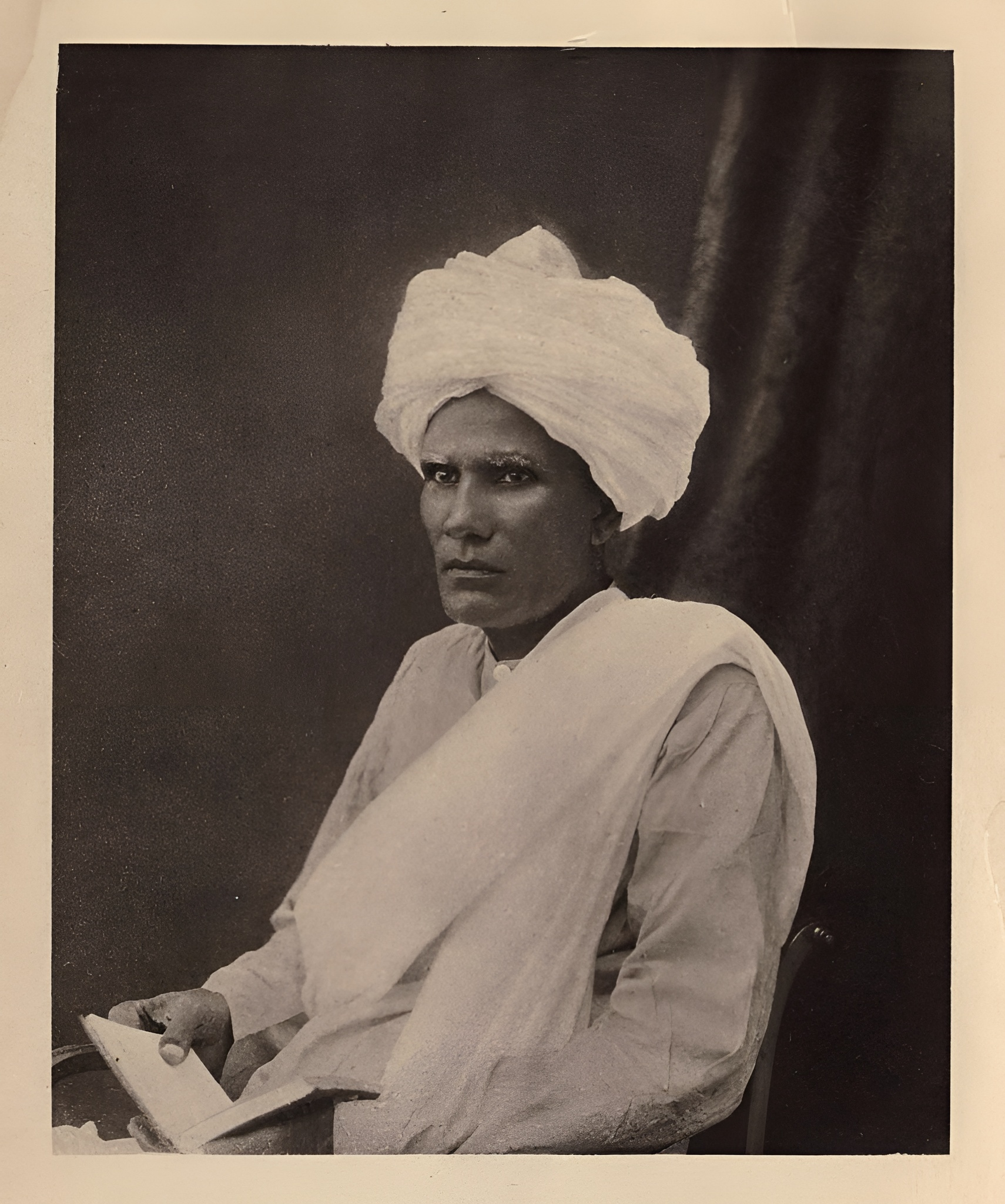
- Sri Arulparananda Swamigal (c. 1890); source: Edward Carpenter

Personal life
- Born: c. 1823 Tanjore
- Died: 18 July 1893 Tanjore
- Notable work: A Visit to a Gñani (as described by Edward Carpenter)
- Honors: Ilakkanam

Religious life
- Religion: Hinduism
- Philosophy: Shaiva Siddhanta, Advaita Vedanta

Religious career
- Teacher: Tillainathan Swami
- Disciples: Ponnambalam Ramanathan, Ponnambalam Arunachalam
- Influenced: Edward Carpenter

Quotation

The pure intelligence (Arivu) is impartite spirit-space (Gñana-akása), nothing else. It becomes fettered by the thought which differentiates this body and its intellectual faculties, its experiences and spheres, as "I" and "mine"; and is emancipated if that differentiation ceases. [...] One must clearly realise that the Intelligence which, shaken by the wind desire, regards wife, children etc. as "mine", and the body, senses, intellectual organs, etc., as "I," is Jiva (the Individual Soul); that the unagitated Intelligence which regards the intelligence in all manifested things, in wife and child, in ant and elephant, and in oneself, as the one Sivam, is Sivam. The space that fills all pots and houses is one. It is differentiated by thought according to the varieties of outer coverings as Brahmin, outcast, King, beggar, palace, hut. But there is no such differentiation in space. So in the pure unagitated Intelligence there is no differentiation. Therefore was it graciously said [by Thiruvalluvar] in the Tirukkural [...]: "He who has destroyed the concept of 'I' and 'mine' will enter a world higher than that of the celestials." (Sri Arulparananda Swamigal)

Sri Arulparananda Swamigal (Tamil: ஸ்ரீ அருள்பரானந்த சுவாமிகள், IAST: Śrī Aruḷparāṉanta Cuvāmikaḷ), originally known as (Ilakkanam) Ramaswami Pillai (Tamil: [இலக்கணம்] இராமசாமி பிள்ளை, IAST: [Ilakkaṇam] Irāmacāmi Piḷḷai) (probably born in Thanjavur, c. 1823 – Thanjavur, 18 July 1893), was a diplomat, advisor to the last Raja of Tanjore, scholar of traditional sciences, grammarian, jñānī, and guru. Arulparananda had an extraordinary impact on two prominent figures in Ceylonese politics and culture—Ponnambalam Ramanathan and Ponnambalam Arunachalam—as well as on the English social thinker Edward Carpenter. He is also the first jñānī whose life, personality, and teachings were described in detail by a Western author (Carpenter) based on first-hand experience.

== Life ==
Arulparananda Swamigal was born between 1820 and 1825, most likely in Tanjore (present-day Thanjavur). His family background is uncertain, though the head of the household is believed to have served the local raja. According to traditional accounts, the birth of the child was revealed to his mother in a dream by the god Murugan. From the age of sixteen, Arulparananda became a devoted worshipper of Murugan. A few years later, while at the Brihadisvara Temple, he reportedly fell asleep and, like his mother, saw Murugan in a dream. The deity was said to have placed his foot on the young man's head, inscribed letters upon his tongue, and told him: "We will come to you to initiate you." Following this, Arulparananda is said to have mastered various sacred sciences and the philosophies of Shaiva Siddhanta and Advaita Vedanta.

Under the guidance of the eminent Tamil scholar Meenakshi Sundaram Pillai (1815–1876), he attained a high level of proficiency in Tamil language and literature. Thereafter, he became widely known by the epithet Ilakkanam ("the Grammarian"). Despite his outstanding proficiency in Tamil language and literature, he left no written work behind.

His learning and reputation for holiness led to his appointment as advisor to the Raja of Tanjore, Shivaji II (r. 1832–1855), who also employed him in diplomatic affairs. After the Raja's death in 1855, he continued in the same capacity under the senior Maharani Kamakshi Bai Sahiba (?–1892). Around 1858, as the Maharani's special envoy, he visited the Tamil political leader in Ceylon, Sir Muthu Coomaraswamy (1834–1879), to request his mediation with the British authorities in a matter of royal succession. On another occasion, while on a diplomatic mission from Tanjore to Kumbakonam, Murugan was believed to have fulfilled his promise by appearing before him in the form of an earthly guru, Tillainathan Swami. The guru bestowed on him the initiatory name Arulparananda. His period of discipleship lasted about three years, during which he alternated between residing in Tanjore and travelling with his master to various South Indian pilgrimage sites. Around 1860, he is said to have attained the ultimate goal of liberation (moksha).

After attaining final realization, he did not become a wandering ascetic (saṃnyasin) like his master, but remained at home in Tanjore with his family. He spent most of his time either absorbed in samadhi or engaged in instructing his disciples, particularly in Tamil language and literature. As advisor to the widowed senior Maharani, he occasionally undertook diplomatic missions on her behalf. He was known simply as Ilakkanam, and kept his exalted spiritual status secret. Arulparananda was described as "a wise man of the East" by Edward Carpenter.

In 1888, for reasons unknown, he visited Muthu Coomaraswamy's nephew and foster child, Ponnambalam Ramanathan (1851–1930), at his Colombo residence, Sukhasthan. From that time onward, Ramanathan, together with his younger brother Ponnambalam Arunachalam (1853–1924), became his disciple. At Arunachalam's invitation, his friend Edward Carpenter (1844–1929) travelled to Ceylon in 1890 to meet Arulparananda. Assisted by Arunachalam's interpretation, Carpenter listened to Arulparananda daily for several weeks, as the latter expounded on the philosophies of Shaiva Siddhanta and Advaita Vedanta, as well as on Yoga. Carpenter published his experiences in Ceylon and India in his 1892 travelogue From Adam's Peak to Elephanta, in which he devoted four chapters to the life and teachings of Arulparananda. These four chapters were later published separately as A Visit to a Gñani (1900). Until Arulparananda's death in 1893, Ramanathan and Arunachalam maintained regular contact with him; either Arulparananda visited them in Ceylon, or they visited him in Tanjore.

During his stay in Kurunegala (Ceylon), Arulparananda contracted what was then known as "Kurunegala fever" (now identified as rat-bite fever). Owing to his robust constitution and his proficiency in traditional medicine, he resisted the illness for three years before it finally overcame him. After his death and paripuranam ("final consummation"), a samadhi was erected for him in Tanjore, where daily rituals were performed for several decades. The samadhi no longer exists; it was most likely washed away by flooding of the Vennar River.

In later decades, his legacy also extended through his grandson, Naganathan (1895–1965), was invited by Ramanathan to Ceylon in 1923. Under the name S. Natesan (Subaiya Natesan), he initially served as Ramanathan's personal secretary and later held increasingly senior positions in the Ceylonese government: he became a member of the State Council of Ceylon, Minister of Posts and Information, later Minister of Posts and Broadcasting, and was eventually elected to the Senate.

== Teachings ==
The teachings of Arulparananda—being in every respect a continuation of tradition—are not distinguished by novelty, which one should not even seek in them, but rather by the fact that he embodied his doctrine with his whole being, especially in its practical aspect. Practical realization, he taught, is determined by the ultimate goal itself. The goal is to attain the universal, thought-free consciousness that lies behind the individual, thought-bound consciousness. This universal consciousness, as it were, "sees through" the surface ripples of the phenomenal world; and in the light of the divine numinous substratum underlying them, the differences between individual phenomena lose their significance. Arulparananda expressed this divine substratum through the symbol of undifferentiated space (ākāśa)—free from all distinctions—while the elements of the phenomenal world correspond to the manifold objects contained within it, which, although they exist in space, do not affect it. Space thus serves as a kind of witness (sākṣin) to the objects it contains. It is precisely this attitude that the yogi, striving toward the ultimate goal, must cultivate—a stance that may rightly be called "the wisdom of non-discrimination"—in order to raise consciousness from particularity to universality.

According to Arulparananda, there are two principal means of accomplishing this. The first is the suspension of thought—the gradual stilling of mental fluctuations. This essentially corresponds to Patañjali's classical definition of yoga: yogaś citta-vṛtti-nirodhaḥ (Yoga Sūtra 1:2)—"Yoga is the restriction of the fluctuations of consciousness." However, the elimination of thought cannot even begin until the yogi makes a serious effort to eradicate desire. This is the second essential means of realization. Desire is just as capable of disturbing the mirror-like surface of the lake of the soul as thought; and thus it can only reflect the moon in a distorted way. The elimination of thought and desire—of attraction and aversion—must therefore proceed hand in hand, according to Arulparananda's practical teaching.

In addition, Arulparananda attached particular importance to transcending the subject–object dichotomy. An intense opposition to the objective world naturally strengthens its counterpart—the subjective pole of the dichotomy, namely individual consciousness. Of course, in its perfection, such transcendence can be attained only in the final realization.

Beyond his practical teachings on yoga in the strict sense, Arulparananda naturally shared the traditional cosmological and metaphysical outlook of Vedanta and Siddhanta, and either remained unfamiliar with the physical, chemical, biological, and cosmological discoveries of Western science or, if he was aware of them, he rejected them—partly on the basis of his traditional learning and partly on that of his own experience. Although Arulparananda, from his own spiritual standpoint, rejected caste distinctions, he was by no means a revolutionary; he regarded caste regulations as necessary for the social order and for the spiritual guidance of the masses.

== Influence ==
Since Arulparananda kept his high spiritual attainment concealed and never appeared publicly as a jnani or guru, his influence manifested only indirectly—through his two principal disciples, the Ponnambalam brothers, and through Edward Carpenter. All three were remarkable figures of their time.

Sir Ponnambalam Ramanathan served for several terms as a member of the Legislative Council and for many years as Solicitor-General of Ceylon—both among the highest offices attainable by Ceylonese under the British colonial administration. Alongside his official duties, he wrote numerous books and essays, approaching each subject—including certain books of the Christian Scriptures—in the light of Arulparananda's teaching, while at all times keeping the identity of his master a secret.

His younger brother, Sir Ponnambalam Arunachalam, conducted Ceylon's first census. Like his brother, Arunachalam served as a member of the Legislative Council and was among the founders of the Ceylon National Congress, of which he became the first president. He was also the first Ceylonese to be elected president of the Ceylon Branch of the Royal Asiatic Society. In addition to his political and scholarly duties, he expressed his master's teaching chiefly through inspired translations and commentaries on classical Tamil poetry, as well as through his various historical, cultural, and philosophical studies. Arulparananda's influence on Arunachalam is evident in a letter he wrote to Carpenter:

O that you were here to meet and commune with the only man I have known who is a seer and not one blindly groping in the dark. He has given me the priceless blessing of belief in God, which my English education had robbed me of for the last twenty years, and he has enabled me to enter the threshold of the mysteries of our religion, which in my folly begotten of arrogance and the material West, in my impatience of forms and ceremonies that I did not understand, I made light of. I never knew till now what sacred truths underlie these forms, and that the latter are but a preparation for those higher stages on the first rung of which I am now placed by God's grace and the Guru (teacher) he has sent me.

While the Ponnambalam brothers devoted their whole being to the spiritual principles they had learned from their master, they nevertheless led a twofold existence: an outward, socio-political life, and an inner life guided by their striving for spiritual perfection.

Although Carpenter was not as profoundly influenced by his encounter with Arulparananda as were the Ponnambalam brothers, he did not keep his acquaintance with the Tanjore jnani a secret; rather, he wrote in detail about his life and teaching in his travelogue on Ceylon and India. This was the first account by a Western author of an Indian jnani based on direct personal experience. He is also to be credited with publishing the letters addressed to him by his friend Arunachalam, which contain a wealth of information about Arulparananda's life and teaching.

== Bibliography ==
=== Primary sources ===
- Edward Carpenter, From Adam's Peak to Elephanta: Sketches in Ceylon and India. London: Swan Sonnenschein & Co. Limited, 1892, pp. 135–203 ("A Visit to a Gñani").
- Edward Carpenter, A Visit to a Gñani: From Adam's Peak to Elephanta. Chicago: Alice B. Stockham & Company, [1900].
- Edward Carpenter, A Visit to a Gñáni: Or Wise Man of the East. London: George Allen & Company, 1911.
- P[onnambalam] Arunáchalam, Light from the East: Being Letters in Gñanam, the Divine Knowledge. London: George Allen & Unwin, 1927. Edited by Edward Carpenter.
- Sridharam K. Guruswamy, A Poets' Poet: Life of Maha Vidwan Sri Meenakshisundaram Pillai. Madras: Mahamahopadhyaya Dr. U. V. Swaminatha Iyer Library, 1976.

=== Further reading ===
- William Hickey, The Tanjore Maharatta Principality in Southern India: The Land of the Chola: The Eden of the South. Madras: Foster Press, 1874.
- Sri Paránanda [Ponnambalam Ramanathan], The Gospel of Jesus According to St. Matthew. London: Kegan Paul, Trench, Trübner & Co., 1898.
- Sri Paránanda [Ponnambalam Ramanathan], An Eastern Exposition of the Gospel of Jesus According to St. John: Being an Interpretation Thereof. London: William Hutchinson & Co., 1902.
- P[onnambalam] Rámanáthan, The Culture of the Soul among Western Nations. New York: G. P. Putnam's Sons, 1906.
- P[onnambalam] Rámanáthan, The Spirit of the East Contrasted with the Spirit of the West. New York: Brooklyn Institute of Arts and Sciences, 1906.
- Edward Carpenter, The Teaching of the Upanishads: Being a Substance of Two Lectures to Popular Audiences. London: George Allen & Unwin, 1920.
- S. Ambikaipakan, The Contribution of Sir Ponnambalam Ramanathan to the Study of Comparative Religion, s. l., s. n., 1976.
- M. Vythilingam, Ramanathan of Ceylon: The Life of Sir Ponnambalam Ramanathan I–II. Colombo: Ramanathan Commemoration Society, 1971–1977. Volume One. Volume Two.
- Ponnambalam Arunachalam, Studies and Translations, Philosophical and Religious. Colombo: Department of Hindu Affairs. Ministry of Regional Development, 1981.
- V. Muttucumaraswamy: Some Eminent Tamils: Writers and Other leading Figures. [Colombo:] Department of Hindu Religious and Cultural Affairs, 1992.
- Buji Ferenc, "Srí Arulparánanda Szvámigal és a meg nem különböztetés bölcsessége I–II." Életünk (Szombathely) 2019/1, pp. 60–84; 2019/2, pp. 6–35. Part One. Part Two.
- Ferenc Buji, Sri Arulparananda Swamigal and the Wisdom of Non-Discrimination (unpublished).
