= The Ceylonese =

Sri Lankan English language newspaper

- Owner(s): The Ceylonese & Co. Limited
- Founder: P. Ramanathan
- Founded: 5 March 1913
- Ceased publication: 1917
- Language: English
- City: Colombo
- Country: Ceylon
- OCLC number: 41941263

The Ceylonese was an English-language newspaper in Ceylon founded by P. Ramanathan and other leading figures. The newspaper started on 5 March 1913 with Americans H. H. Marcus as manager and Tom Wright as editor. The paper was based at Tichborne Hall, Tichborne Avenue in Maradana, Colombo. The paper's other directors included Hector Alfred Jayewardene and Francis de Zoysa. The paper was editorially nationalistic and was run like an American newspaper, a contrast to other Ceylonese papers which were run according to the British model.

Ramanthan used the paper to promote his candidature for the Educated Ceylonese seat in the Legislative Council of Ceylon. During the 1911 election the de Soysa family had used their paper, The Morning Leader, to attack Ramanthan so that their relative Marcus Fernando would win the election. This tactic failed with Ramanthan defeating Fernando by 1,645 votes to 981 votes.

After some time differences arose between the paper's directors and Ramanathan resigned from the board of directors. The remaining directors and shareholders continued to use the paper to promote their own interests. World War I also impacted on the paper - there was war-time censorship and the cost of newsprint, ink, types and machinery soared. The paper faced serious financial problems - it was making a loss and had large debts. F. R. Senanayake issued a writ to auction the paper's assets in order to recover a Rs. 21,000 loan. As a result, the paper ceased publication in late 1917.

D. R. Wijewardena saw The Ceylonese's demise as an opportunity to grow his fledgling media empire. The auction for the paper's assets took place in December 1917. At the auction Senanayake and his brother D. S. Senanayake asked Wijewardena to make a bid of Rs. 21,000, the amount of the writ, but bidding was slow. Wijewardena was able to buy the paper's plant and goodwill with a bid of Rs. 16,000. He also paid off the remainder of mortgage held by F. R. Senanayake. Wijewardena subsequently started the Ceylon Daily News on 3 January 1918 using The Ceylonese assets.
