= James Van Langenberg =

Ceylonese judge

James Van Langenberg KC
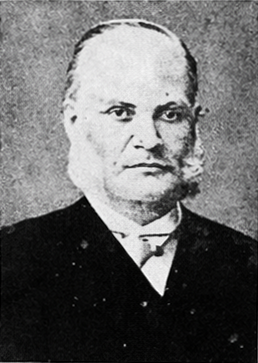

5th Solicitor General of Ceylon
- In office 1912–1915
- Governor General: Henry McCallum
- Preceded by: James Cecil Walter Pereira
- Succeeded by: Thomas Garvin

Personal details
- Born: James Arthur Van Langenberg; 2 March 1866
- Died: 30 April 1915 (aged 49)
- Spouse: Francis Ethel Vander Straaten (m.1892)
- Children: Ethel, Lillian Eleanor, Edith Frances Agatha, Beatrix, James William, Henry, Bertha, Cyril, Arthur, Hugh Patrick

James Arthur Van Langenberg KC (2 March 1866 – 30 April 1915) was the 5th Solicitor General of Ceylon.

James Arthur Van Langenberg was born in Colombo on 2 March 1866, the second son of James Arthur Van Langenberg (1839–1886) Knight Commander of the Papal Order of St. Gregory the Great, advocate and member of the Legislative Council of Ceylon, and Maria Susan née Toussaint (1839–1901). He matriculated at Merton College, Oxford in 1886, and was called to the bar at the Inner Temple in 1888.

On 16 May 1892 he married Francis Ethel Vander Straaten (1867–1948) in St. Mary's Church, Bambalapitiya. They had ten children: Ethel (b.1893), Lillian Eleanor (b.1894), Edith Frances Agatha (b.1895), Beatrix (b.1898), James William (b.1900), Henry (b.1901), Bertha (b.1903), Cyril (b.1906), Arthur (b.1909) and Hugh Patrick (b.1911).

He was appointed Solicitor General of Ceylon in 1912, succeeding James Cecil Walter Pereira, and held the office until 1915. He was succeeded by Thomas Garvin.

Legal offices
Preceded by James Cecil Walter Pereira	Solicitor General of Ceylon; 1912–1915	Succeeded by Thomas Garvin
