= Simon Casie Chetty =

Ceylonese civil servant (1807–1860)

Mudaliyar Simon Casie Chetty MLC CCS
- சைமன் காசிச் செட்டி

Unofficial Member (Tamil), Legislative Council of Ceylon
- In office 1838–1845
- Preceded by: A. Coomaraswamy
- Succeeded by: V. Edirmannasingham

Personal details
- Born: 21 March 1807 Kalpity, Ceylon
- Died: 5 November 1860 (aged 53) Kalpity, Ceylon
- Occupation: Civil servant

Simon Casie Chetty (Tamil: சைமன் காசிச் செட்டி, romanized: Caimaṉ Kācic Ceṭṭi; 21 March 1807 – 5 November 1860) was a Ceylonese civil servant, author and member of the Legislative Council of Ceylon.

== Early life and family ==
Casie Chetty was born on 21 March 1807 in Kalpity in north-western Ceylon. He was the son of Gabriel Casie Chetty, Mudaliyar of Kalpity, and Marie de Rosairo. He belonged to Ceylon's small Chetty community, descendants of Tamils from Tirunelveli district in India who migrated to Ceylon during Portuguese rule and converted to Catholicism. Gabriel's father Adrian converted to Protestantism during Dutch rule and was a member of the Dutch Reformed Church.

Simon Casie Chetty was baptised as an Anglican in Colombo. He was educated at a Tamil school in Kalpity and in Colombo. As well as Tamil, he was proficient in English, Sinhalese, Sanskrit, Hebrew and Arabic. He also had knowledge of Portuguese, Dutch, Latin and Greek.

Casie Chetty married his cousin in 1839. They had two sons (John and Aloysius) and a daughter.

== Career ==
Casie Chetty was appointed interpreter to the magistrates court in Kalpity in 1824, aged 17. He was appointed interpreter to the Office of Assistant Collector of Puttalam in 1826 and in 1828 he became collector of Chilaw. Following the death of his father in 1837 he was appointed Mudaliyar and a proctor. He later became Maniagar (British appointed administrative chief) for Puttalam.

Following the death of A. Coomaraswamy Casie Chetty was appointed to the Legislative Council of Ceylon in 1838 as the unofficial member representing Tamils. He resigned after seven years and joined the Ceylon Civil Service, becoming the first Ceylonese civil servant. He was appointed police magistrate in Kalpity in 1847 and district judge for Chilaw, a position he held until his death.

Casie Chetty was responsible for the construction of St. Peter's Church in Kalpity in 1839 and paid half the costs himself. He also ran a Tamil school in Kalpity catering for 50 boys. He became a member of the Ceylonese branch of the Royal Asiatic Society when it was established in 1845. He wrote several books and manuscripts, most notably Ceylon Gazetteer (1834), The Tamil Plutarch (1859) and The Castes, Customs, Manners and Literature of the Tamils (1934).

Casie Chetty died on 5 November 1860 in Kalpity. Prior to his death he had converted to Catholicism. The Sri Lankan government issued a 75 cent stamp in 1989 honouring Casie Chetty.
