= Leelawathy Ramanathan =

Australian writer (1870–1953)

- Born: Lillie Harrison; 1870; Australia
- Died: January 31, 1953 (aged 82–83); Chunnakam, Jaffna, Ceylon
- Other names: Lilavati Ramanathan, R. Lilavati
- Occupations: Writer, editor, philanthropist
- Spouse: Ponnambalam Ramanathan
- Relatives: S. Natesan (son-in-law)

Tirumati Leelawathy Ramanathan (1870 – January 31, 1953) née R. L. Harrison or Lillie Harrison, was the Australia-born wife of Ponnambalam Ramanathan of the Ponnambalam-Coomaraswamy family. She was a writer and editor, and a convert to Hinduism who studied Hindu theology and built a temple in her husband's memory.

== Biography ==
Kurinji Andavar Temple, built by Ramanathan in her husband's memory

Lady Ramanathan was born in Australia, where her Yorkshire-born father Frederick Drake Harrison was involved in gold mining at Adelaide. As a young woman, she was attracted by the theosophical movement in Australia. Searching for further spiritual enlightenment, moved to Ceylon, where Ponnambalam Ramanathan became her guru. She accompanied him as a secretary on his 1905–1906 tour of the United States, and published an illustrated book, Western Pictures for Eastern Students (1907), about their travels in America.

In 1907 she married Ramanathan, who was a widower. She studied Hindu scriptures, converted to Hinduism and took the name Leelavathy. She wrote several Hindu books, including a version of the Ramayana in English. She also edited and published Ponnambalam's lectures on Hinduism.

The Ramanathans spent much of their time in Kodaikanal where they had three houses, Ammanadi, Sivanadi, and Muruganadi. When Sir Ramanathan died in 1930, she built the Kurinji Andavar Temple in Tamil Nadu, in her husband's memory, overlooking the Palani shrine of Lord Sri Muruga and surrounded by kurinji flowers.

She was president of the Ramanathan College for Girls in Chunnakam, Jaffna, Ceylon. She received an honorary doctorate from the University of Ceylon, for "her untiring labours in the cause of women's education".

She became Lady Ramanathan when her husband was knighted in 1921. They had a daughter, Sivagamasundari, who married politician S. Natesan. Lady Ramanathan died in 1953, in Chunnakam.

== Publications ==
- The Gospel of Jesus according to St. Matthew, as interpreted to R. L. Harrison by the light of the godly experience of Sri Paránanda (1898)
- Western Pictures for Eastern Students (1907)
