= Arthur Alvis =

Ceylonese politician

Arthur Alvis (16 June 1856 – ??) was a Ceylonese lawyer and politician. He was a member of the Legislative Council of Ceylon.

Educated at S. Thomas' College, Alvis was enrolled as a proctor in 1878, practicing in the district courts and later in the supreme court. He served a member of the Colombo Municipal Council from the Kollupittiya Ward and then Fort Ward. In the 1911 Legislative Council election, he was elected to the Legislative Council for the Ceylonese seat. He was reelected in the 1921 Legislative Council election.

Alvis married Madeleine Cecilia Daniel. Lady Madeleine Louise Garvin, wife of Sir Thomas Garvin, judge of the Supreme Court was his daughter.
