= List of knights bachelor appointed in 1921 =

Knight Bachelor is the oldest and lowest-ranking form of knighthood in the British honours system; it is the rank granted to a man who has been knighted by the monarch but not inducted as a member of one of the organised orders of chivalry. Women are not knighted; in practice, the equivalent award for a woman is appointment as Dame Commander of the Order of the British Empire (founded in 1917).

== Knights bachelor appointed in 1921 ==
The date is that on which the knighthood was first announced, either in the New Year or Birthday honours lists, or in the official notice in the London or Edinburgh Gazette recording the actual conferral.

Date first gazetted	Name	Notes	Ref
1 January 1921	Ivor Algernon Atkins, MusDoc, FRCO	Organist of Worcester Cathedral; Conductor of the Three Choirs Festival	
1 January 1921	Reginald Blair, MP	Member of Parliament for Bow and Bromley. Appointed "for public services".	
1 January 1921	Thomas Jewell Bennett, CIE, MP	Member of Parliament for Sevenoaks Division; editor of The Times of India. Appointed "for public services".	
1 January 1921	Richard Dawson Bates, OBE	Appointed "for public and local services".	
1 January 1921	James Bell, Jr	Member of Shipping Committee of the Hull Chamber of Commerce and of Humber Conservancy Board. Appointed "for public and local services".	
1 January 1921	Samuel Barrow, JP	Member of the Trade Committee relating to reconstruction. "For public and local services in Surrey".	
1 January 1921	Lt-Col. Henry Baldwin Barton, JP	Mayor of Finsbury since 1911. Appointed "for public and local services".	
1 January 1921	James Denham	Author	
1 January 1921	John Daniel	Member of Cardiff City Council and the Cardiff Education Committee; President of the Cardiff Cymmrodorion; Chairman of the Glamorganshire Branch, National Union of Welsh Societies. Appointed "for public and local services".	
1 January 1921	William Davies	Editor, The Western Mail	
1 January 1921	Andrew Rae Duncan	Coal Controller since 1919.	
1 January 1921	Henry Foreman, OBE, MP	Member of Parliament for North Hammersmith; formerly Mayor of Hammersmith. Appointed "for municipal and local services".	
1 January 1921	John Charles Fox	Senior Master, Supreme Court, Chancery Division.	
1 January 1921	Capt. Francis John Childs Ganzoni, MP	Member of Parliament for Ipswich. Appointed "for public services".	
1 January 1921	Charles Frederick Gill, KC	Recorder of Chichester	
1 January 1921	Cllr William Hopwood, JP	Appointed "for public and local services in Lancashire".	
1 January 1921	John Martin Harvey	Actor	
1 January 1921	William Hodgson	Appointed "for public and local services in Crewe".	
1 January 1921	Alexander McAuseland Kennedy, JP	President of the Shipbuilding Employers' Federation of Great Britain; member of government advisory committees at wartime. Appointed "for public and local services".	
1 January 1921	Harry Vernon Kilvert, JP	Appointed "for public and local services in Cheshire".	
1 January 1921	Professor Peter Redford Scott Lang	Professor, St Andrew's University. Appointed "for public services".	
1 January 1921	Richard Roope Linthorne	Town Clerk of Southampton. Appointed "for public and local services".	
1 January 1921	John Mitchell	Provost of Ayr. Appointed "for municipal and local services".	
1 January 1921	William Edgar Nicholls, JP	Director, Barclay's Bank. Appointed "for public services".	
1 January 1921	Ernest Fitzjohn Oldham	Deputy Chairman, Federation of British Industries. Appointed "for public services".	
1 January 1921	Thomas David Owen	Appointed "for public and local services in Merseyside in connection with the University College of North Wales".	
1 January 1921	Maj. William Reid, MBE	Chairman, Board of Management of the Royal Glasgow Asylum for the Blind. Appointed "for public and local services".	
1 January 1921	Charles Ryall, CBE, FRCS	Senior Surgeon to the Cancer Hospital and the Bolingbroke Hospital. Appointed "for public services".	
1 January 1921	John Rose, LLD	Treasurer of the Carnegie University (Scotland) Trust; Chairman of Carnegie (UK) Trust and Hero Fund. Appointed "for public services".	
1 January 1921	Thomas Rowbotham	Mayor of Stockport, 1916-18. Appointed "for public and local services".	
1 January 1921	His Honour Judge Walworth Howland Roberts	County Court Judge, Marylebone.	
1 January 1921	William Peter Rylands	President, Federation of British Industries	
1 January 1921	Edwin Savill		
1 January 1921	Harold Smith, MP	Member of Parliament for Warrington.	
1 January 1921	Samuel Squire Sprigge, MD, MRCS	Editor, The Lancet	
1 January 1921	Edwin Forsyth Stockton	Governor, Manchester University. Appointed "for local and public services".	
1 January 1921	Alderman William Wade, JP	Lord Mayor of Bradford, 1919–20; Member, Bradford Chamber of Commerce. Appointed "for public and local services".	
1 January 1921	Professor James Walker	Professor of Chemistry, University of Edinburgh	
1 January 1921	Capt. Lionel de Lautour Wells, CB, CMG, CBE, RN	Lately Chief Officer, Metropolitan Fire Brigade. Appointed "for public services".	
1 January 1921	Dawson Williams, MD, FRCP	Editor, The British Medical Journal	
1 January 1921	Richard John Williams	Mayor of Bangor, 1913-20. Appointed "for public and local services".	
1 January 1921	Arthur Worley, CBE	General manager, North British and Mercantile Insurance Company. Appointed "for public services".	
1 January 1921	Edward Coey Bigger, MB, MCh	Chairman, Public Health Council (Ireland); Medical Member, Local Government Board of Ireland	
1 January 1921	Henry Campbell	Town Clerk of Dublin	
1 January 1921	Robert Meyer	Town Clerk of Belfast	
1 January 1921	Ernest Godwin Swifte, KC	Chief Metropolitan Police Magistrate, Dublin	
1 January 1921	George Herman Collier, CIE	Director-General of Stores, India Office	
1 January 1921	Thomas Walker Arnold, CIE, LittD	Lately Educational Adviser for Indian Students to the Secretary of State	
1 January 1921	Mr Justice Brod Bahadur Shadi Lal	Barrister; Chief Justice, High Court, Punjab	
1 January 1921	Surendra Nath Banerjea	Elected Member, Viceroy's Legislative Council	
1 January 1921	Gokaldas Kahandas Parekh	Pleader, Bombay	
1 January 1921	Montagu de Pomeroy Webb, CIE, CBE	Merchant, Karachi	
1 January 1921	Alexander Robertson Murray, CBE	Senior Partner, Messrs Thomas Duff & Co., Calcutta; President, Chamber of Commerce	
1 January 1921	Khan Bahadur Mirza Abdul Husain Sahib	Sheriff of Madras	
1 January 1921	Marakjee Byramjee Dadabhoy, CIE	Barrister, Nagpur	
1 January 1921	Thomas Smith, VD	Manager, Muir Mills Co., Cawnpore	
1 January 1921	Raj Bahadur Hari Ram Goenks, CIE	Merchant and landholder in Bengal	
1 January 1921	Hon. Theophilus Cooper	Judge, Supreme Court of New Zealand	
1 January 1921	Frederick Dutton	Honorary Treasurer, Royal Colonial Institute	
1 January 1921	Henry Cowper Gollan, CBE	Attorney-General, Island of Ceylon	
1 January 1921	Alexander Jarvis Hood, MB	Senior Honorary Physician at the Prince of Wales (Military) Hospital, Randwick	
1 January 1921	George Hunter	Member of the House of Representatives, New Zealand. The entry in The London Gazette noted that he had "rendered valuable assistance in connection with the settlement of returned soldiers".	
1 January 1921	Hon. Edward Lucas	Agent-General in London for the State of South Australia	
1 January 1921	Hon. John Emanuel Mackey, LLB	Speaker of the Legislative Assembly of the State of Victoria	
1 January 1921	Pietro James Michelli, CMG	Secretary, London School of Tropical Medicine	
1 January 1921	Ernest Oppenheimer	Honorary Secretary, South African War Memorial Fund. The London Gazette stated that he "took a leading part in recruiting, both of combatants and labourers, for various fronts during the War".	
1 January 1921	Michel' Angelo Refalo, CBE, LLD	Chief Justice and President of the Court of Appeal for the Island of Malta	
1 January 1921	Newton John Stabb, OBE	Chief manager, Hong Kong and Shanghai Baking Corporation. Appointed "for services on behalf of British trade and interests in the Far East".	
1 January 1921	Henry Strakosch	Appointed "for financial services to the Union of South Africa in connection with the War".	
11 January 1921	Maurice Craig, MD, FRCP		
11 January 1921	Percival Horton-Smith Hartley, CVO, MD		
11 January 1921	William Francis Lathlain	Mayor of Perth, Western Australia	
11 January 1921	William Mitchell Acworth		
11 February 1921	John Ross		
11 April 1921	Cuthbert William Whiteside	Mayor of Grahamstown, Union of South Africa. Invested by the Governor-General "in connection with the celebration of the Centenary of the settlement of the Eastern Province of the Cape of Good Hope"	
4 June 1921	Wilfred Atlay	Chairman, London Stock Exchange	
4 June 1921	Jeffrey Browning, CBE, ISO	Chief Inspector, Board of Customs and Excise	
4 June 1921	William Henry Butlin	Formerly Vice-Consul for Spain. Appointed "for public services".	
4 June 1921	James Charles Calder, CBE	Formerly Director of Timber Control. Appointed "for public and national services".	
4 June 1921	Robert Clough, MP	Member of Parliament for Keighley; Mayor of Keighley, 1907–08	
4 June 1921	Thomas Henry Fleming	Mayor of Harrogate, 1915–17, 1918-19. The London Gazette noted that he "rendered conspicuous services during the war in the promotion of every local effort, giving his whole time to national work".	
4 June 1921	Thomas Mansel Franklen	Clerk of the Peace for Glamorgan; Clerk to the Glamorgan County Council since 1888. Appointed "for public services".	
4 June 1921	Francis Gore-Browne, KC, JP	Chairman, Rates Advisory Committee; Chairman, Civil Service Arbitration Board, 1918-20.	
4 June 1921	His Honour Judge Thomas Colpitts Granger, JP	Senior County Court Judge.	
4 June 1921	John Roger Barrow Gregory	Senior Partner, Rawle, Johnstone & Co.; Treasurer, Foundling Hospital; Past Master, Grocers' Company; Member, Council of the Law Society; "has given very great assistance to successive holders of the office of Lord Chancellor".	
4 June 1921	Col. James William Greig, CB, KC, VD, MP	Member of Parliament for West Renfrewshire.	
4 June 1921	Alderman Lt-Col. Harry George Handover, JP	Mayor of Paddington	
4 June 1921	John Henry Harrowing	Alderman of North Riding County Council, formerly a councillor. Appointed "for public services".	
4 June 1921	William Henderson, CB	Town Councillor, Dundee, 1896-1904; Chairman of Technical College; Chairman, YMCA and City of Dundee Territorial Association, 1907-19. Appointed "for public and local services".	
4 June 1921	Francis Hugh George Hercy, CBE, DL	Appointed "for valuable voluntary services rendered for 5 years to the Ministry of National Service and War Office".	
4 June 1921	John Scott Hindley	Commercial Advisor to the Coal Mines Department	
4 June 1921	Henry Hollingdrake, JP	Appointed "for public and local services".	
4 June 1921	Charles John Holmes, MA, DLitt	Director, National Gallery	
4 June 1921	Cllr Sidney Richard White Humphries	Councillor, Bristol; President, Bristol Chamber of Commerce. Appointed "for public services".	
4 June 1921	Samuel Instone	Founder, Askern Garden City. Appointed "for public services".	
4 June 1921	Arthur Keith, MD, FRCS, LLD, FRS	Hunterian Professor and Conservator, Royal College of Surgeons	
4 June 1921	Duncan Mackenzie Kerly, KC	Member, Commission on Income Tax; Chairman, Board of Referees for Excess Profits Duty	
4 June 1921	Leonard William Kershaw	King's Coroner, Master of the Crown Office, and Registrar of the Court of Criminal Appeal	
4 June 1921	William Lane-Mitchell, MP	Member of Parliament for Streatham; formerly Mayor of Camberwell.	
4 June 1921	Alfred Edward Lewis	Managing Director, National Provincial and Union Bank of England Ltd	
4 June 1921	Thomas Lewis, CBE, MD, FRCP, DSc, FRS	Honorary Consulting Physician to the Ministry of Pensions. Conferred on 10 February 1922.	
4 June 1921	Dyson Mallinson	Appointed "for public services"; he had "rendered valuable services in connection with various colleges and institutions".	
4 June 1921	Brig. Charles Philip Martel, CB	Chief Superintendent, Ordnance Factories, Woolwich.	
4 June 1921	Richard Martin, JP	Formerly Mayor of Swansea	
4 June 1921	George Mellor, JP	Appointed "for public and national services, particularly in connection with the King's Lancashire Military Convalescent Hospital".	
4 June 1921	Adrian Donald Wilde Pollock	City Chamberlain and Treasurer	
4 June 1921	Walter Renton Preston, MP	Member of Parliament for Stepney (Mile End Division)	
4 June 1921	William Henry Purchase	Appointed "for valuable services rendered since the Armistance to the Appointments Department of the Ministry of Labour".	
4 June 1921	Professor John Rankine, KC, LLD, JP	Professor of Scots Law, University of Edinburgh	
4 June 1921	Francis Jubal Reynolds, JP	Appointed "for public services".	
4 June 1921	Edward Rhodes	Chairman, Lancashire and Cheshire Coalition Liberal Committee; Chairman, Manchester Reform Club.	
4 June 1921	Frederick Gill Rice	Past President, London Master Builders' Association; Past President, Institution of Public Builders. Appointed "for public services".	
4 June 1921	Col. Philip Wigham Richardson, OBE, VD	Appointed "for services rendered throughout the Empire for 40 years in connection with rifle shooting".	
4 June 1921	Alderman Alfred Read Sergent, BA, JP	Mayor of Hove during the First World War	
4 June 1921	Henry White Smith, CBE	Chairman, Bristol Aircraft Factory. Appointed "for services to Civil Aviation".	
4 June 1921	William Henry Thomas, MBE	Member, City Corporation; Depury of Ward of Cheape.	
4 June 1921	John Turner, DL	Formerly High Sheriff of Leicestershire. Appointed "for public services".	
4 June 1921	Francis Minchin Voules, CBE, KStJ	Appointed "For services rendered to British Prisoners of War".	
4 June 1921	Robert Woolley Walden	Chairman, Metropolitan Asylums Board; Alderman, City of Westminster Council; Mayor of Westminster, 1908-9. Appointed "for public services."	
4 June 1921	Sydney Russell Wells, MD, BSc, MRCP, MRCS	Vice-Chancellor, University of London. Representative of the University of London on the General Medical Council. Appointed "for public services".	
4 June 1921	Howell James Williams, DL, JP	Deputy Chairman, London County Council	
4 June 1921	Robert Wilson	Formerly Provost of Pollokshaws	
4 June 1921	Alfred Woodgate, CBE	Director-General of Establishments, Ministry of Health	
4 June 1921	Bernard Swanwick Wright	Alderman, City of Nottingham. Appointed "for public services".	
4 June 1921	George Beresford Butler	Senior Resident Magistrate in Ireland. Conferred on 10 February 1922.	
4 June 1921	Frederick Conway Dwyer, MD	Formerly President, College of Surgeons in Ireland; Lt-Col, Royal Army Medical Corps; Operating Suergeon to the King George V Military Hospital, Dublin; Honorary Surgeon to the Lord Lieutenant of Ireland; Chairman, House of Industry Hospitals; HM Inspector of Anatomy, Ireland.	
4 June 1921	James Campbell Percy, DL, JP	Honorary Lt, Royal Navy; Proprietor, Motor News, Irish Builder and Irish Cyclist and Motor Cyclist; Chairman, Sackville Press	
4 June 1921	Henry James Forde, JP	Appointed "for services in connection with the grain trade in Ireland and as member of the Royal Commission on Wheat Supplies".	
4 June 1921	Mr Justice Theagaraja Ayyar Sadasiva Ayyar, Diwan Bahadur	Puisne Judge of the High Court, Madras	
4 June 1921	Mr Justice William Teunon	Indian Civil Service; Puisne Judge of the High Court, Calcutta	
4 June 1921	Mr Justice William Tudball	Indian Civil Service; Puisne Judge of the High Court, Allahabad	
4 June 1921	Khan Bahadur Muhammad Israr Hasan Khan, CIE	Judicial Minister, Bhopal State	
4 June 1921	Alfred Donald Pickford	Senior Partner, Messrs Begg, Dunlop & Co., Calcutta	
4 June 1921	Edgar Joseph Holberton, CBE	Manager, Bombay-Burma Trading Corporation; lately President of the Chamber of Commerce, Burma	
4 June 1921	Jehangir Hormasji Kothari, OBE	Landlord in Sind, Bombay	
4 June 1921	Rai Bahadur Seth Bisheshar Das	Banker in Nagpur	
22 June 1921	John Walton Browne, MD, LLD, DL		
22 June 1921	Alderman Joseph Davison	High Sheriff of the City of Belfast	
22 June 1921	John Burke, JP, DL		
25 June 1921	Edgar Stanford London, CBE	Chief Inspector, Stamps and Taxes	
25 June 1921	Lewis Richardson, CBE		
25 June 1921	Brig. Donald Johnstone McGavin, CMG, DSO, MD	In the Army Medical Department of the Military Forces of New Zealand	
25 June 1921	John Pearce Luke, CMG	Member, House of Representatives of New Zealand; Mayor, Wellington	
25 June 1921	Sidney Kidman		
25 June 1921	Benjamin John Fuller		
25 June 1921	Hugh Dixson		
25 June 1921	Ponnambalam Ramanathan, CMG, KC	Unofficial Member, Legislative Council of Ceylon	
25 June 1921	John Burchmore Harrison, CMG	Director and Government Analyst, Department of Science and Agriculture, Colony of British Guiana	
25 June 1921	Walter Sydney Shaw	Chief Justice of the Straits Settlements	
25 June 1921	Brevet Lt-Col. Wyndham Henry Deedes, CMG, DSO	Civil Secretary to the Administration, Palestine	
10 August 1921	Hon. Mr Justice George Arthur Harwin Branson		
3 November 1921	William Robert Pryke	Sheriff of the City of London	
23 December 1921	Charles Frederick Higham, MP	Appointed "for services rendered to the Ministry of Transport". Conferred on 10 February 1922.	
23 December 1921	Henry Allen Holden Steward	Appointed "for services rendered to the Ministry of Transport". Conferred on 10 February 1922.	

Colonel Sidney Wishart, VD, DL, JP, an outgoing Sheriff of London, was unable to attend the investiture ceremony in November 1921 and so was invested in 1922.
