= Walter Pereira =

James Cecil Walter Pereira KC

4th Solicitor General of Ceylon
- In office 1906–1912
- President: Henry Arthur Blake
- Preceded by: Ponnambalam Ramanathan
- Succeeded by: James Van Langenberg

Personal details
- Born: 10 September 1856
- Died: 9 June 1915 (aged 58) Colombo, Ceylon
- Spouse: Helena Blanche née McCarthy
- Children: Aelian Walter Woodward; Aileen Helena Suzette Woodward; Christine Helen Wilhelmina Woodward
- Education: Colombo Academy; St. Thomas' College; Calcutta University
- Occupation: jurist
- Profession: lawyer

James Cecil Walter Pereira (10 September 1856 – 9 June 1915) was the 4th Solicitor General of Ceylon. He was appointed in 1906, succeeding Ponnambalam Ramanathan, and held the office until 1912. He was succeeded by James Van Langenberg.

James Cecil Walter Pereira was born on 10 September 1856, the second son of John Pereira, a school master at Queen's College and Susan Sally née de Haan. He was educated at the Colombo Academy, St. Thomas' College and graduated from Calcutta University. In 1878 he was admitted as a proctor of the District Court of Colombo, having served an apprenticeship under Frederick Charles Loos. In 1880 he enrolled as a proctor of the Supreme Court of Colombo. In late 1885 he travelled to England and was admitted to the Middle Temple and was called to the bar in early 1887. The same year he returned to Ceylon and was admitted as an advocate of the Supreme Court. He was admitted as an advocate of the High Court of Madras. In 1904 he was made a King's Counsel.

Pereira was a prominent member of the Ceylon National Association and was a founder of the Orient Club, the first Ceylonese only social club in the country.

In 1895 he married Helena Blanche née McCarthy (1875-1961) and they had three children: Aelian Walter Woodward (b. 1896); Aileen Helena Suzette Woodward (b. 1899) and Christine Helen Wilhelmina Woodward (b. 1905).

== Bibliography ==
- Pereira, James Cecil Walter (1901). Laws of Ceylon, Volume 1. Colombo, Ceylon: Government Printer.
- Pereira, James Cecil Walter (1904). Laws of Ceylon, Volume 2. Colombo, Ceylon: Government Printer.

Legal offices
Preceded by Ponnambalam Ramanathan	Solicitor General of Ceylon; 1906–1912	Succeeded by James Van Langenberg
