= John Rockwood =

Ceylonese doctor and cricket administrator

Dr John Rockwood

Lieutenant Colonel Dr John Rajathurai Rockwood, VD (29 October 1881 – 2 December 1935) was the leading administrator and patron of cricket in Ceylon from 1914 to 1935. He helped put the nation's cricket administration in the hands of the Ceylonese, and served as president of the Ceylon Cricket Association from its formation in 1922 until 1933. A doctor, he was also a commanding officer of the Ceylon Medical Corps.

== Early life and medical career ==
A Tamil, Rockwood was one of four sons and four daughters of Dr W. G. Rockwood, who represented the Tamils in the Legislative Council of Ceylon. John Rockwood was educated at Royal College, Colombo. He gained his medical qualifications at Ceylon Medical College and took further medical studies in Edinburgh and Glasgow. He became a lecturer at Ceylon Medical College.

Joining the Ceylon Medical Corps, Rockwood went on to serve as its commanding officer from 1927 to 1931 and was awarded the Volunteer Officers' Decoration.

== Cricket administration ==
While still in his teens Rockwood was one of the founders of the Tamil Union Cricket and Athletic Club in Colombo, and was its first honorary secretary and one of its opening bowlers. He captained Tamil Union in 1908. After a few years with Tamil Union he moved to the Nondescripts Cricket Club, where he and W. G. McCarthy, the father of the Ceylon cricketer Pat McCarthy, developed the club's grounds and buildings in 1916.

He played a leading part in the formation of a committee of Colombo cricket clubs in 1913, which took most of the game's administration away from the British settlers. He and the committee organised the visit to Ceylon by The Rev. E. F. Waddy's New South Wales cricket team in 1913–14. In 1916 he began sponsoring cricket tours and matches personally, with a visit by the cricket team from the Young Men's Indian Association of Madras. In 1919 he took a Ceylon team of 15 players to play in Bombay.

In 1920 Rockwood went to England at his own expense to try to persuade Marylebone Cricket Club (MCC) to send a team to Ceylon. He was told such tours could be arranged only with Ceylon's national cricket administrative body, so when he returned he set about forming the Ceylon Cricket Association, the forerunner of the current Sri Lanka Cricket. The Association was formed on 13 July 1922, and Rockwood was unanimously elected president, a position he held until 1933.

The first MCC tour took place in January and February 1927, when MCC played four first-class matches in Ceylon as part of their tour of the Indian subcontinent. Apart from that tour, the first three first-class tours of Ceylon were all organised and sponsored by Rockwood.

The first team Rockwood brought to Ceylon was W. E. Lucas's Bombay team in February 1926, which played what is now regarded as the first first-class match in Ceylon, against a Ceylon team named in Rockwood's honour. Playing on the Nondescripts Cricket Club Ground that Rockwood had developed, Dr J. Rockwood's Ceylon XI, a mixture of Ceylonese and European cricketers, beat W. E. Lucas's Bombay XI by seven wickets. Rockwood also brought over J. D. Antia's team from Bombay in December 1929, when Dr J. Rockwood's Ceylon XI again won the only first-class match. In December 1930 he brought over the Maharaj Kumar of Vizianagram's XI, a strong team which included many of the best Indian players as well as the English champion batsmen Jack Hobbs and Herbert Sutcliffe. The Maharaj Kumar of Vizianagram's XI won the first match against Dr J. Rockwood's Ceylon XI and the other two were drawn.

In all, Rockwood sponsored 47 cricket matches in Sri Lanka, including five of Sri Lanka's first nine first-class matches. He gained nothing financially from any of his sponsorships, donating the proceeds to charity or to the Ceylon Cricket Association.

== Other sports ==
Rockwood was also at various times the president of the bodies governing football, hockey, swimming and athletics in Ceylon. He organised the first overseas trip by the Ceylon hockey team, their tour of Madras in 1921.

== Personal life ==
Rockwood and his wife Sivakolundu had four children. He died on 2 December 1935, aged 54. Colonel David Rockwood was his nephew.
