= Kumaraswamy ministry =

Kumaraswamy ministry may refer to:

- First Kumaraswamy ministry, the government of Karnataka headed by H. D. Kumaraswamy from 2006 to 2007
- Second Kumaraswamy ministry, the government of Karnataka headed by H. D. Kumaraswamy from 2018 to 2019

== See also ==
- H. D. Kumaraswamy
- Kumaraswamy (disambiguation)
