= Colonial period =

Colonial period (a period in a country's history where it was subject to management by a colonial power) may refer to:

== Continents ==
- European colonization of the Americas
- Colonisation of Africa
- Western imperialism in Asia

== Countries ==
- Colonial Chile
- Spanish conquest of Guatemala
- Viceroyalty of Peru
- Colonial history of the United States
- British Raj, British colonial rule in India, 1858 to 1947
- British Hong Kong, British colonial rule in Hong Kong, 1841 to 1997 (excluding World War II)
- Colony of Ceylon (disambiguation)
- French Indochina, French colonial rule in Vietnam, Cambodia, and Laos
- French Algeria, French colonial rule in Algeria, 1830 to 1962
- Australia:
  - History of Australia (1788–1850)
  - History of Australia (1851–1900)

== See also ==
- Early modern period, the era from 1400–1800 CE
  - Age of Discovery or Exploration, the period from c. 1418 – c. 1620 during which seafarers from European countries explored, colonized, and conquered regions across the globe
- Colonialism
  - History of colonialism
