= S. D. Ratwatte =

Sri Lankan army officer

Colonel Sooriyaratne Douglas Ratwatte, ED was a Sri Lankan army officer. He was the Commandant of the Volunteer Force.

Born in to a prominent Radala family in Kandy, Ratwatte was educated at Trinity College, Kandy. He joined the Ceylon Defence Force and was commissioned as a second lieutenant in the Ceylon Light Infantry in 1938. With the outbreak of World War II, Ratwatte was mobilised for war service and served in the 1st Battalion and 5th Battalion of the Ceylon Light Infantry. In 1942, he volunteered to serve with the British Army in Burma. Following training, he was attached to the 15th Punjab Regiment, based in Arakan in command of a company. Following the formation of the Ceylon Army, Major Ratwatte remained with the Ceylon Volunteer Force. He was appointed the first commanding officer of the 2nd (Volunteer) Sinha Regiment at its formation in Kandy on 1 October 1956 with the rank of lieutenant colonel. He held the appointment till May 1963. In February 1962, in the immediate aftermath of the attempted military coup of 1962, he was appointed as the Deputy Commandant of the Ceylon Volunteer Force having been promoted to colonel, succeeding Colonel Fredrick de Saram who had been arrested after being implicated as one of the coup leaders. In 1963, he succeeded Colonel B. R. Heyn as Commandant of the Volunteer Force. After his term as commandant finished, he retired from the army. He was recalled to active service during the 1971 JVP insurrection and was appointed military coordinating officer of the Badulla district.

His decorations included the Efficiency Decoration (Ceylon), Burma Star, the Defence Medal, the War Medal 1939–1945, Queen Elizabeth II Coronation Medal and the Ceylon Armed Services Inauguration Medal.

== See also ==
- David Rockwood
