= W. G. Rockwood =

Ceylon Tamil physician and politician (1843–1909)

W. G. Rockwood MLC MD MRCS MRCP
- டபிள்யூ. ஜி. ரொக்வூட்

Unofficial Member (Tamil), Legislative Council of Ceylon
- In office 1898–1906
- Preceded by: P. Coomaraswamy
- Succeeded by: A. Kanagasabai

Personal details
- Born: 13 March 1843
- Died: 27 March 1909 (aged 66)
- Children: John Rockwood
- Education: Presidency College, Madras; Madras Medical College
- Profession: Physician
- Ethnicity: Ceylon Tamil

William Gabriel Rockwood (Tamil: வில்லியம் கேப்ரியல் ரொக்வூட்; 13 March 1843 – 27 March 1909) was a Ceylon Tamil physician and member of the Legislative Council of Ceylon.

== Early life and family ==
Rockwood was born on 13 March 1843. He was the son of Sinnathamby Elisha Rockwood, a customs sub-collector from Alaveddy in northern Ceylon.

Rockwood was educated at Vembadi Boys School before being sent to study at Presidency College, Madras from where he matriculated. He then joined Madras Medical College in 1861 on a scholarship, graduating in June 1866 with a first class degree in medicine and surgery.

Rockwood married Mutthammah, daughter of Sinna Mudaliyar Kathiravetpillai from Moolai, in 1871. They had four sons and four daughters.

== Career ==
Two months after returning to Ceylon Rockwood joined the Government Medical Service as Medical Officer of Puttalam. He was involved with dealing with the 1866/67 cholera epidemic in Jaffna. He returned to Puttalam and served there until 1875. He was involved with dealing with the 1875 cholera epidemic in Jaffna. He later received a MD degree from the University of Madras. He then served as Medical Officer of Hambantota and Gampola. In 1878, following the death of E. L. Koch, Rockwood was appointed surgeon-in-charge of Colombo General Hospital. He also lectured in surgery and midwifery at the Ceylon Medical College. He ceased to be surgeon-in-charge in 1883 but he continued to work as a surgeon at the hospital. In 1884 he went to England from where he obtained MRCS and MRCP qualifications. After retirement, Rockwood was appointed to the specially created post of consulting-surgeon of the Colombo General Hospital in 1898.

Rockwood was appointed to the Legislative Council of Ceylon in 1898 as the unofficial member representing Tamils, replacing P. Coomaraswamy. He was re-appointed in 1903. He was one of the leading supporters of constructing a new railway line to northern Ceylon and Chilaw. Ill health forced him to retire from the Legislative Council in 1906.

Rockwood was president of the Ceylon Branch of the British Medical Association.

Rockwood died on 27 March 1909.
