= V. Edirmannasingham =

Sri Lankan politician

V. Edirmannasingham MLC

Unofficial Member (Tamil), Legislative Council of Ceylon
- Preceded by: Simon Casie Chetty

Personal details
- Ethnicity: Ceylon Tamil

Visuvasingam Edirmannasingham was a Ceylon Tamil member of the Legislative Council of Ceylon.

Edirmannasingham was the son of Manapillai Visuvasingam from Inuvil in northern Ceylon. He was appointed to the Legislative Council of Ceylon in 1846 as the unofficial member representing Tamils, replacing Simon Casie Chetty.
