= Barbara Bonner =

Clinical psychologist

- Citizenship: American
- Occupation: Professor of Pediatrics
- Awards: APA Award for Distinguished Contributions of Applications of Psychology to Education and Training (2014)

Academic background
- Education: Oklahoma State University

Barbara L. Bonner is a clinical psychologist and expert on juvenile sex offenders. She is known for her research on the assessment and treatment of abused children, prevention of child fatalities due to neglect, and treatment of children and adolescents with problematic sexual behavior. Bonner is the CMRI/Jean Gumerson Endowed Chair and Professor of Pediatrics at the University of Oklahoma College of Medicine. She serves as the director of child abuse and neglect at the University of Oklahoma Health Sciences Center.

Bonner was recipient of the 2014 American Psychological Association Award for Distinguished Contributions of Applications of Psychology to Education and Training. Her award cited "her passionate determination to improve the lives of children throughout the world by training countless professionals to be leaders in the field of child maltreatment, for her leadership in establishing one of the most highly respected centers for the study of child maltreatment in the nation, and for directing an interdisciplinary training program on child maltreatment". Bonner was previously awarded the 2001 APA Nicholas Hobbs Award for Child Advocacy from the Society for Child and Family Policy and Practice (APA Division 37).

== Biography ==
Bonner received her B.S. degree in Special Education at Oklahoma State University. She obtained a master's degree in Educational Assessment and a PhD in Clinical Psychology at Oklahoma State University (1984).

Bonner's career has focused on developing interventions for children with problematic sexual behavior and the treatment and prevention of child abuse. In 1985, while working as a postdoctoral fellow at the University of Oklahoma Health Sciences Center (supervised by C. Eugene Walker), Bonner established the Adolescents with Illegal Sexual Behavior Treatment Program. In 1987, she joined the faculty of the University of Oklahoma Health Sciences Center and established its Interdisciplinary Training Program in Child Abuse and Neglect. In 1992, she established the Center on Child Abuse and Neglect in the Department of Pediatrics of the University of Oklahoma Health Sciences Center, and a treatment program for children with sexual behavior problems.

Bonner served terms as president of the International Society for Prevention of Child Abuse and the American Professional Society on the Abuse of Children (APSAC). The APSAC awarded Bonner the Outstanding Service award in 1997 and the Ronald C. Laney Distinguished Service Award in 2012 in recognition of her contributions through leadership and service to the Society. Her other awards include the 2011 Byliner Award for Child Advocacy from the Association for Women in Communications.

Bonner's work has been funded by the National Center on Child Abuse and Neglect and by the U.S. Department of Health and Human Services. Bonner is co-author (with C. Eugene Walker and Keith Kaufman) of the practitioner guide The Physically and Sexually Abused Child: Evaluation and Treatment. She is author of the booklet Taking Action: Support for Families of Adolescents with Illegal Sexual Behavior, distributed by the Safer Society Foundation to provide information and support for parents and caregivers of juvenile sex offenders. Her research paper "Family preservation and family support programs: Child maltreatment outcomes across client risk levels and program types" (co-authored with Mark Chaffin and Robert Hill) received the Pro Humanitate Literary Award from the North American Resource Center for Child Welfare in 2002. This large-scale study failed to find evidence that statewide Family Preservation and Family Support programs were effective in decreasing child maltreatment.

== Representative publications ==
- Bonner, B. L., Crow, S. M., & Hensley, L. D. (1997). State efforts to identify maltreated children with disabilities: A follow-up study. Child Maltreatment, 2(1), 52–60.
- Bonner, B. L., & Everett, F. L. (1986). Influence of client preparation and problem severity on attitudes and expectations in child psychotherapy. Professional Psychology: Research and Practice, 17(3), 223–229.
- Bonner, B. L., Walker, C. E., & Berliner, L. (2001). Children with sexual behavior problems: Assessment and treatment. National Clearinghouse on Child Abuse and Neglect Information.
- Chaffin, M., Silovsky, J. F., Funderburk, B., Valle, L. A., Brestan, E. V., Balachova, T., ... & Bonner, B. L. (2004). Parent-child interaction therapy with physically abusive parents: efficacy for reducing future abuse reports. Journal of Consulting and Clinical Psychology, 72(3), 500–510.
- Chaffin, M., Bonner, B. L., & Hill, R. F. (2001). Family preservation and family support programs: Child maltreatment outcomes across client risk levels and program types. Child Abuse & Neglect, 25(10), 1269–1289.
- Welch, G. L., & Bonner, B. L. (2013). Fatal child neglect: Characteristics, causation, and strategies for prevention. Child Abuse & Neglect, 37(10), 745–752.
