= Thomas Garvin =

Sri Lankan judge (1881–1940)

Hon. Justice Sir Thomas Garvin KC

Puisne Justice of the Supreme Court of Ceylon
- In office 1924–1935

Solicitor General of Ceylon
- In office 1915–1917

Personal details
- Spouse: Lady Madeleine Louise Garvin
- Education: Royal College Colombo
- Profession: Lawyer

Sir Thomas Forrest Garvin II, KC (8 August 1881 – 19 June 1940) was a Ceylonese (Sri Lankan) judge and lawyer. He was a judge of the Supreme Court of Ceylon and Solicitor General of Ceylon.

Born to Dr Thomas Forrest Garvin and Grace Louisa Vander Smagt, he was educated at Royal College Colombo and Colombo Law College. In 1903 he became an Advocate and began his legal practice and became the third Crown Counsel in 1908. He was promoted to Senior Crown Counsel in 1912; he went on to serve as acting Solicitor General and Additional District Judge of Colombo before he was confirmed in the appointment of Solicitor General in 1915. He served in this capacity until 1924 and served as acting Attorney General on several occasions. In this capacity he was an ex officio member of the Legislative Council of Ceylon. In 1924 he was appointed as a Puisne Judge of the Supreme Court of Ceylon and went on to serve as acting Chief Justice on three occasions.

He retired from the bench in 1935 and was made a Knight Bachelor in the 1935 Birthday Honours; previously he was appointed a King's Counsel. Garvin married Madeleine Louise Alvis, daughter of Arthur Alvis, proctor and member of the Legislative Council of Ceylon.
