= Commandant of the Volunteer Force =

Head of the Sri Lanka Army Volunteer Force

Commandant Sri Lanka Army Volunteer Force (SLAVF) has been the title of the head of the Sri Lanka Army Volunteer Force. The post is held by a regular officer of the rank of major general and is the fourth senior position in the army. Commandant is in charge of the Volunteer Force Headquarters and is assisted by a deputy commandant.

== History ==
Established in 1956 as the Commandant Ceylon Volunteer Force, it was head by the second-ranking member of the General Staff from 1956 to 1966. Since 1966, it became the third-ranking after that of Commander of the Army and Chief of Staff. In the early 1990s with the creation of the post of Deputy Chief of Staff it became the fourth-ranking position in the army and has become a two-star (Major General) since the early 1980s.

== List of commandants ==
- Colonel H. W. G. Wijeyekoon OBE ED
- Colonel M A G De Mel psc
- Colonel B R Heyn
- Colonel S. D. Ratwatte ED
- Brigadier B K V J E Rodrigo VSV ndc psc MA
- Brigadier H V Athukorale psc FBIM
- Brigadier E G Thewanaygam VSV
- Brigadier C. A. M. N. Silva VSV USAWC
- Major General H Wanasinghe ndc
- Major General S M A Jayawardena VSV ndc psc
- Brigadier N G A L D S De Wijesekara
- Major General Y Balarathna Rajah ndc
- Major General G H De Silva ndc
- Major General C J Abayaratna
- Major General A M U Seneviratne ndc
- Major General T N De Silva
- Major General W R Wijeyaratne
- Major General H S Hapuarachchi USP
- Major General E H Samaratunga USP
- Major General J Nammuni USP
- Major General A K Jayawardhana RWP RSP rcds psc
- Major General H N W Dias RWP RSP VSV USP ndc IG
- Major General A E D Wijendra RSP USP ndc psc MSC
- Major General S H S Kottegoda WWV RWP RSP USP ndc
- Major General A M C W P Seneviratna UPS ndc psc
- Major General G S C Fonseka RWP RSP VSV USP rcds psc
- Major General M D S Chandrapala USP ndu psc
- Major General N Mallawaarachchi RWP USP ndc psc
- Major General D V S Y Kulatunga RSP USP ndc psc
- Major General U B L Fernando RWP RSP ndu psc
- Major General S R Balasuriya USP ndc psc IG
- Major General J J P S T Liyanage RSP USP ndc IG ldmc
- Major General D R A B Jayathilaka RWP RSP VSV USP ldmc
- Major General A W J C De Silva RWP USP ndu psc
- Major General S A P P Samarasinghe RSP USP psc
- Major General S W L Daulagala RSP USP ndu
- Major General HCP Goonetilleke RSP VSV USP ndc psc
- Major General MHSB Perera RWP RSP USP ndu psc PhD
- Major General A P de Z Wickramaratne RWP ndu psc
- Major General G R H Dias VSV USP ndc psc IG
- Major General S D T Liyanage WWV RWP USP ndc psc
- Major General L M Mudalige RWP RSP ndu
- Major General N A Dharmaratne WWV RWP RSP ndu psc
- Major General H J S Gunawardena RSP VSV USP ndc psc
- Major General T S Bangsajayah RWP RSP VSV USP ndu
- Major General P R Wanigasooriya VSV USP ndu USACGSC
- Major General J M U D Jayasinghe
- Major General K N S Kotuwegoda ndc IG
- Major General C D Weerasuriya RWP RSP ndu
- Major General D G S Senarath Yapa RWP RSP ndu
