= 1911 Ceylonese Legislative Council election =

1st Ceylonese Legislative Council election
12–13 December 1911	1917 →

The first election to the Legislative Council of Ceylon was held in 1911 to elect four councillors for the following four electorates - two for European electorates (European urban and European rural) one for the Burgher electorate and one for the Ceylonese electorate. Four unofficial members were to be selected through an election and the remainder would be appointed by the Governor. The two European seats for registered European rural and urban inhabitants (previously the Governor had appointed three members to represent these areas) were filled without any election as there was only one nomination for each. The Burgher seat was contested by three candidates, whilst the seat for "educated" Ceylonese was contested by two candidates, with both winning candidates elected by large winning margins.

Elections were held on 12 December for the Burgher seat and 13 December for the Ceylonese seat, with the results formally released on 18 December. Hector William van Cuylenburg (later Sir) was elected with 829 votes, with H Geo Thomas and Arthur Alvis receiving 466 votes and 273 votes respectively. A total of 1,568 Burghers (72.9%) of the total 2,149 registered voters casting their vote. Ponnampalam Ramanathan (later Sir) was elected with 1,645 votes with Dr. H. Marcus Fernando (later Sir), receiving 981 votes. A total of 2,626 (89.5%) of the total 2,934 registered voters casting their vote.

The election results were formalised in the Government Gazette on 22 December. The first meeting of the new Legislative Council was held in the afternoon of 16 January 1912.
