= S. Kumarasamy =

Ex-Municipal Chairman, Kumbakonam
- In office 1987–1988

Personal details
- Born: Kumbakonam Tamil Nadu, India
- Spouse: Sulochana Ammal
- Profession: Social work

Sivasubramaniam Kumarasamy Pillai generally referred as Kumarasamy Pillai (Tamil: குமரசாமிபிள்ளை), or Komachi (Tamil: கோமாட்சி), is a well-known politician and social worker in the Kumbakonam town. From his student life he actively engaged in several social works. He is an ardent follower of E. V. Ramasami and K. Kamaraj.

== Early life ==
S. Kumarasamy was born to Thiru G. Sivasubramaniam Pillai and Thirumathi Jeevarathinam Ammal at Kumbakonam.

His grandfather Shri. Gurunadha pillai was one among few notable rich and affluent people during his period. Places such as Darasuram Kolikodu near Cholapuram, Elichanur, acres of vast agricultural lands were owned by him. Also the places in Kumbakonam, were British’s camp normally referred as 1933 club and today the place where Thanga Villas Tobacco factory situate, all once owned by Shri. Gurunadha Pillai. During his lifetime, he donated a vast portion of his lands to the poor and the needy. He was a Municipal member of Kumbakonam during those days.

S. Kumarasamy’s father G. Sivasubramaniam Pillai was a person who was totally devoted to Gandhism principles. In 1938, he was a Municipal member of Kumbakonam when Dr. Thiyagarajan was the Chairman.

== Education ==
- In 1954, S. Kumarasamy joined the Government Arts College (Men), Kumbakonam and completed his Bachelor's degree in Arts.

== Politics ==
- During his college period, he was attracted by Periyar E. V. Ramasamy principles and joined the students political wing of Dravidar Kazhagam. later, he took responsibility of holding various posts, in the students wing of Tanjore District Dravidar Kazhagam. In 1954 when K. Kamaraj came to power as the Chief Minister, Periyar supported K. Kamaraj as an individual, because of his commitment to people’s issues. Further, Periyar labeled K. Kamaraj as the "Pachai Tamizhan" (Raw Tamilian) and allowed Dravidar Kazhagam members to join K. Kamaraj. During that time, S. Kumarasamy wrote a letter to Periyar E. V. Ramasamy seeking his approval, and after his sanction, he then joined the Congress party.
- In 1991 he joined the D.M.K and Janata Dal alliance.
- After a brief period he remained in other parties, and later disassociated from active politics, to remain as a Social worker.

== Election contest ==
- In 1969 S. Kumarasamy first time contested and lost his victory. Later 1987, he again contested and won the Municipal election at Kumbakonam. Later, taking responsibility for his defeat in the assembly elections, he resigned his Chairman post in 1988.
- In 1991, Mr. Rama Ramanathan won the assembly election, when S. Kumarasamy contested the election with Janata Dal support.

== Principles ==
- Very simple in nature, he doesn't wear shoes or even slippers. Never wears a wristwatch and possesses neither a car or a two wheeler.

== Service ==
- During his college days, his college administration arranged a separate hostel for the scheduled and backward caste people. He opposed this illegal suppression on the basis of caste system and fought for justice and finally abolished that arrangement.
- In 1967, he was arrested for protesting against the government owned toddy shops. From the year 1967, he holds a record of being in prison for a maximum tenure, than any other congressman in Tamil Nadu state, for holding peaceful political agitations.
- He was also arrested for holding various peaceful protests, relating to farmers and weavers wage related matters.
- S. Kumarasamy is known for his service, in helping several poor students to get school and college admissions.
- During his office tenure, there was an encroachment in municipal owned area. Members during the day proceedings, accused the Chairman for not doing enough to evacuate the encroachments from municipal lands. S. Kumarasamy immediately adjourned the proceedings and along with his co- members and workers, reached the specified location and made sure eviction is done. The day proceedings resumed later.
- Previously near Adi Kumbeswarar Temple, South Street, the town people have to walk a long distance from the main road to their residence, due to the blockage of a municipal compound wall. Understanding the local people's hardship, Shri. S. Kumarasamy removed a section of the municipality compound wall, to facilitate a free movement of the public. Even now, an engraved stone stands at that particular point, giving a brief detail about the incident.
