= A. Kanagasabai =

Ceylon Tamil lawyer and politician (1856–1927)

Sir A. Kanagasabai MLC
- அ. கனகசபை

Unofficial Member (Tamil), Legislative Council of Ceylon
- In office 1906–1917
- Preceded by: W. G. Rockwood

Member, Executive Council of Ceylon

Personal details
- Born: 1856
- Died: 1927 (aged 70–71)
- Education: Madras Christian College
- Profession: Lawyer
- Ethnicity: Ceylon Tamil

Sir Ambalavanar Kanagasabai (Tamil: அம்பலவாணர் கனகசபை; 1856 – 1927) was a Ceylon Tamil lawyer and member of the Legislative Council of Ceylon.

== Early life and family ==
Kanagasabai was born in 1856. He was the son of Suppiramaniam Ambalavanar from Tellippalai in northern Ceylon. Kanagasabai is believed to be a descendant of Ilankai Nayaga Mudaliyar of Karaikadu, one of the pioneer settlers of Jaffna Peninsula.

Kanagasabai was educated privately before being sent to Madras Christian College from where he graduated in 1878 with an arts degree. He then studied law and was called to the bar in August 1882.

Kanagasabai married Kamachi Ambal, daughter of Sangarapillai Kanagasabai, in 1885.

== Career ==
Kanagasabai started practising law at the Jaffna Bar in 1882. He became leader of the bar in 1907. He was one of the leading supporters of constructing a new railway line to northern Ceylon.

Kanagasabai was appointed to the Legislative Council of Ceylon in 1906 as the unofficial member representing Tamils, replacing W. G. Rockwood. He was re-appointed in 1912. He served on the Legislative Council for eleven years. Kanagasabai was appointed to the Executive Council of Ceylon in 1921.

Kanagasabai was president of the Saiva Paripalana Sabai and helped establish Jaffna Hindu College, serving as the president of its board of directors. He also established a Hindu temple on Slave Island. He was a member of the Royal Asiatic Society, the Agricultural Society, the Board of Education, the Committee of the Victoria Home for Incurables and president of the Board of Directors of the Jaffna Commercial Corporation. He was knighted in 1917, the third Ceylon Tamil to be done so.

Kanagasabai died in 1927.
