= Ponnambalam Ramanathan =

Ceylon lawyer & politician (1851–1930)

Sir Ponnambalam Ramanathan CMG KC
- பொன்னம்பலம் இராமநாதன்
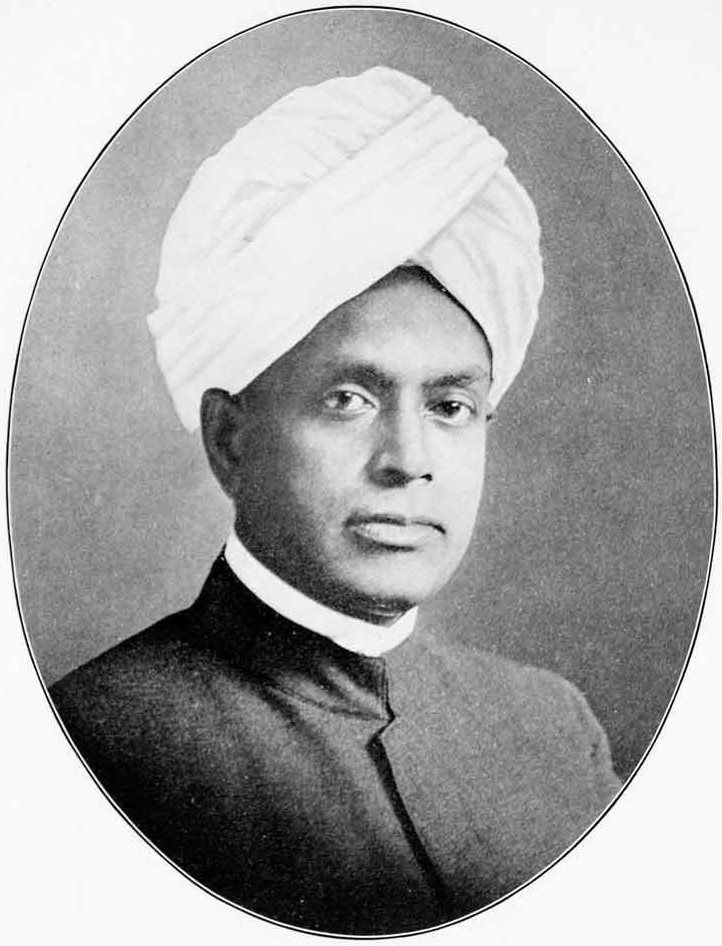

Solicitor-General of Ceylon
- In office 1892–1906
- Governor: Arthur Havelock
- Preceded by: Charles Layard
- Succeeded by: James Cecil Walter Pereira

Unofficial Member (Tamil) Legislative Council of Ceylon
- In office 1879–1892
- Preceded by: Muthu Coomaraswamy
- Succeeded by: P. Coomaraswamy

Unofficial Member (Educated Ceylonese) Legislative Council of Ceylon
- In office 1911–1921
- Succeeded by: James Peiris

Unofficial Member Legislative Council of Ceylon
- In office 1921–1924

Member of the Legislative Council of Ceylon for Northern Province North
- In office 1924–1930

Personal details
- Born: P. Ramanathan; 16 April 1851 Colombo, Ceylon
- Died: 26 November 1930 (aged 79) Colombo, Ceylon
- Education: Presidency College, Madras
- Profession: Advocate
- Ethnicity: Ceylon Tamil

Sir Ponnambalam Ramanathan, CMG, KC (Tamil: பொன்னம்பலம் இராமநாதன், romanized: Poṉṉampalam Irāmanātaṉ; 16 April 1851 – 26 November 1930) was a Ceylonese lawyer and politician who served as Solicitor-General of Ceylon.

== Early life and family ==
Ramanathan was born on 16 April 1851 at the home of his maternal grandfather A. Coomaraswamy on Sea Street, Colombo in south western Ceylon. He was the son of Gate Mudaliyar A. Ponnambalam, a leading government functionary, and Sellachi Ammai. He was the brother of P. Coomaraswamy and P. Arunachalam. Ramanathan had his early education at home before joining Colombo Academy in 1861. Ramanathan and his brother Coomaraswamy entered Presidency College, Madras in 1865. The brothers completed the Intermediate in Arts and started the degree course but, following "youthful excesses" by Coomaraswamy, both were recalled to Ceylon without completing the course.

Ramanathan married Sellachchi Ammal, daughter of Mudaliyar E. Nannithamby, in 1874 at Ward Place, Colombo. They had three sons (Mahesan, Rajendra and Vamadeven) and three daughters (Sivakolunthu, Rukmini). After being widowed Ramanathan married Australian R. L. Harrison (later known as Leelawathy). They had a daughter, Sivagamisundhari.

== Career ==
Returning to Ceylon, with the help of his maternal uncle Muthu Coomaraswamy Ramanathan became a law apprentice under Richard Morgan, Queen's Advocate of Ceylon. Ramanathan became an advocate of the Colombo bar in 1874. (Note: Another source says Ramanathan became an advocate in 1873.) He was responsible for editing law reports for the previous 36 years and later served as editor of the official law reports (the Supreme Court Circular and the New Law Reports) for ten years. Ramanathan stopped practising law in 1886 to concentrate on politics. In 1888, he became acquainted with a jnani from Thanjavur, Sri Arulparananda Swamigal (born Ramaswamy Pillai), who had previously served as an advisor and diplomatic envoy to the last Raja of Tanjore, Shivaji (r. 1832–1855), and who thereafter became his spiritual teacher. Although Ramanathan never explicitly mentioned his master in his writings, the profound influence of Arulparananda is evident in the fact that he published his most important spiritual works under the name Sri Paránanda, an abbreviated form of his guru's name.

Ramanathan was appointed to the Legislative Council of Ceylon in 1879 as the unofficial member representing Tamils, replacing his maternal uncle Muthu Coomaraswamy. In 1880 he founded the Ceylon National Association, of which he was president, to campaign for constitutional reform. Whilst on a tour of Europe Ramanathan, his wife, and his daughter were presented to Queen Victoria, and he was called to the bar at the Inner Temple in 1886. Allan Bennett served as a tutor to the younger sons of the yogi and Ramanathan went on to be Bennett's teacher in yogic practices. Ramanathan wrote a book during this period, published under his Shaivite holy name of Sri Parananda and titled An Eastern Exposition of the Gospel of Jesus according to St. John (1902), in which he argued that the teachings of Christ could be understood as instructions in yoga. He was appointed Solicitor-General of Ceylon in 1892. In 1903 he became one of the first Ceylonese to be appointed King's Counsel. In 1905, prior to his retirement in 1906, he went on a tour of the US, where he gave lectures on Hinduism and Hindu philosophy.

Ramanathan founded the National Reform Association in 1907. He contested the 1911 legislative council election as a candidate for the Educated Ceylonese seat and was elected to the Legislative Council, defeating physician Marcus Fernando. Ramanathan was responsible for the release of the Sinhalese leaders who had been arrested following the 1915 Ceylonese riots, travelling to the UK to make their case. He was re-elected at the 1916 legislative council election, defeating Justus Sextus Wijesinghe Jayewardene.

Ramanathan was appointed as an unofficial member of the Legislative Council in 1921. He contested the 1924 legislative council election as a candidate for the Northern Province North (Valikamam North) seat and was re-elected to the Legislative Council.

Ramanathan was made a Companion of the Order of St Michael and St George in the 1889 Birthday Honours. He was made a Knight Bachelor in 1921. (Note: Another source claims Ramanathan was made a Knight Commander of the Order of St Michael and St George.) Ramanathan founded two schools in northern Ceylon – Parameshwara College, Jaffna and Ramanathan College. In 1907 Ramanathan rebuilt the Sri Ponnambala Vaneswara Temple at Sea Street in Kochchikade, founded by his father. He helped establish the Hindu Education Board in 1923 and served as its president and manager of schools. He was also president of the Thiruvalluvar Maha Sabai in Madras. Ramanathan and other leading figures founded The Ceylonese, an English-language newspaper, in 1913. He was president of the Tamil Union Cricket and Athletic Club from 1917 to 1930. Ramanathan opposed extending voting rights to the people and urged reservation of franchise only to men of the Vellalar caste.

Ramanathan died on 26 November 1930 at his home Sukhastan on Ward Place, Colombo. (Note: Other sources claim Ramanathan died on 30 November 1930.) Future Prime Minister D. S. Senanayake described Ramanathan as "the greatest Ceylonese of all times".

== Works ==
- On Faith or Love of God (1897)
- An Eastern Exposition of the Gospel of Jesus According to St. Matthew (1898)
- An Eastern Exposition of the Gospel of Jesus According to St. John (1902)
- The Spirit of the East Contrasted with the Spirit of the West (1905)
- Culture of the Soul Among Western Nationals (1907)
- 'The Miscarriage of Life in the West' in The Hibbert Journal, vol. vii, no. 1 (London: Williams & Norgate, 1909)
- Tamil translation of Bhagavat Gheetha (1914)

== Electoral history ==
Electoral history of Ponnambalam Ramanathan
| Election | Constituency | Party | Votes | Result |
|---|---|---|---|---|
| 1911 legislative council | Educated Ceylonese | | 1,645 | Elected |
| 1916 legislative council | Educated Ceylonese | | 1,704 | Elected |
| 1924 legislative council | Northern Province North | | | Elected |
