= A. Coomaraswamy =

Gate Mudaliyar A. Coomaraswamy MLC
- ஆ. குமாரசுவாமி

Unofficial Member (Tamil), Legislative Council of Ceylon
- In office 1833–1836
- Succeeded by: Simon Casie Chetty

Personal details
- Born: 1783 Garudavil, Ceylon
- Died: 7 November 1836 (aged 52–53)
- Ethnicity: Ceylon Tamil

Arumugampillai Coomaraswamy (Tamil: ஆறுமுகம்பிள்ளை குமாரசுவாமி; 1783 – 7 November 1836) was a Ceylon Tamil member of the Legislative Council of Ceylon.

== Early life and family ==
Coomaraswamy was born in 1783 in Garudavil near Point Pedro in northern Ceylon. He was the son of Arumugampillai.

Coomaraswamy married Visalachchi. They had a son (Muthu Coomaraswamy) and a daughter (Sellachi). Coomaraswamy was the grandfather of four eminent Ceylon Tamils: Ananda Coomaraswamy, P. Coomaraswamy, P. Ramanathan and P. Arunachalam.

== Career ==
Coomaraswamy was appointed Mudaliyar of the Governor's Gate in 1805. He was personal officer to Governor Brownrigg between 1812 and 1822. He also served governors Paget and Barnes.

When the Legislative Council of Ceylon was established in 1833 Coomaraswamy was appointed as the unofficial member representing Tamils.

Coomaraswamy died on 7 November 1836.
