= Colony of Ceylon =

Colony of Ceylon may refer to:

- Portuguese Ceylon
- Dutch Ceylon
- British Ceylon
