= Muthu Coomaraswamy =

Ceylon Tamil lawyer (1834–1879)

Sir Muthu Coomaraswamy KCMG MLC MMC FRGS FGS
- முத்து குமாரஸ்வாமி

Unofficial Member (Tamil) Legislative Council of Ceylon
- In office 1861–1879
- Preceded by: V. Edirmannasingham
- Succeeded by: P. Ramanathan

Member of Colombo Municipal Council
- In office 1868–1873

Personal details
- Born: 23 January 1834 Mutwal, Ceylon
- Died: 4 May 1879 (aged 45)
- Children: Ananda Coomaraswamy
- Education: Colombo Academy
- Profession: Lawyer
- Ethnicity: Ceylon Tamil

Sir Muthu Coomaraswamy (Tamil: முத்து குமாரஸ்வாமி; 23 January 1834 – 4 May 1879) was a Ceylon Tamil lawyer, writer and member of the Legislative Council of Ceylon.

== Early life and family ==
Coomaraswamy was born on 23 January 1834 in Amaittodam, Mutwal in south western Ceylon. He was the son of Gate Mudaliyar A. Coomaraswamy and Visalachchi Ammaiyar. From 1842 to 1851 he was educated at Colombo Academy where he won the Turnour Prize in 1851.

Coomaraswamy married Elizabeth Clay Beebe, daughter of William Beebe from Kent, in 1878. They had a son, Ananda Coomaraswamy, the eminent art critic.

== Career ==
After finishing school Coomaraswamy joined the Ceylon Civil Service as a cadet at the Colombo Kachcheri. He was appointed police magistrate and was known as the "boy magistrate". He resigned from the civil service after a short period. He joined the legal profession as an apprentice under Richard Morgan. He was called to the bar at the age of 22.

Coomaraswamy was appointed to the Legislative Council of Ceylon in 1862 as the unofficial member representing Tamils, replacing V. Edirmannasingham. He served on the Legislative Council until his death in 1879. He was a member of Colombo Municipal Council from March 1868 to February 1873.

Coomaraswamy went on a tour of Europe in 1862 during which he was admitted as a member of Lincoln's Inn on 10 July 1862, the first non-Christian/Jew to be done so. He practised law in London. His English translation of the Tamil play Harischandra (Martyr of Truth) was published in 1863. Coomaraswamy took on the leading role when the play was performed in front of Queen Victoria on 8 December 1863. He was elected an honorary member of the Royal Society of Arts and was a fellow of the Royal Geographical Society and the Geological Society of London. He was also a member of the Athenaeum Club.

After returning to Ceylon Coomaraswamy resumed practising law at the Colombo Bar. He undertook research into oriental folklore before going on a tour of India. His translation of the Pali text Datavamsa, the story of the Sacred Tooth Relic, and Sutti Nipaata, the discourses of the Buddha, were published in 1874.

In 1878 Coomaraswamy became the first Tamil knight after being made a knight of the Order of St Michael and St George by Queen Victoria at Osborne House. He died on 4 May 1879 of Bright's disease whilst preparing for another tour of England.
