= P. Coomaraswamy =

Ceylon Tamil lawyer (1849–1906)

Mudaliyar P. Coomaraswamy MLC MMC

Unofficial Member (Tamil), Legislative Council of Ceylon
- In office 1892–1898
- Preceded by: P. Ramanathan
- Succeeded by: W. G. Rockwood

Member of Colombo Municipal Council
- In office 1873–1879
- In office 1885–1889

Personal details
- Born: 7 December 1849
- Died: 7 June 1906 (aged 56) Colombo, Ceylon
- Education: Presidency College, Madras
- Profession: Lawyer
- Ethnicity: Ceylon Tamil

Ponnambalam Coomaraswamy (7 December 1849 – 7 June 1906) was a Ceylon Tamil lawyer and member of the Legislative Council of Ceylon.

== Early life and family ==
Coomaraswamy was born on 7 December 1849. He was the son of Gate Mudaliyar A. Ponnambalam. He was the brother of P. Ramanathan and P. Arunchalam.

Coomaraswamy was educated at Colombo Academy, Colombo and Presidency College, Madras.

== Career ==
Coomaraswamy joined the legal profession after finishing his education.

Coomaraswamy was a member of Colombo Municipal Council from January 1873 to October 1879 and from November 1885 to December 1889. He was appointed to the Legislative Council of Ceylon in 1893 as the unofficial member representing Tamils, replacing his brother Ramanathan.

Coomaraswamy was a Tamil scholar and a publisher of Tamil literature. He was president of Jaffna Saiva Paripalana Sabai and helped establish Jaffna Hindu College. He also established a Hindu temple on Slave Island.

Coomaraswamy died on 7 June 1906 in Colombo.

P. COOMARA SWAMY had the honor of welcoming Swami Vivekananda and delivering the welcome address on 15 January 1897, after the latter's return from the West. This lecture can be seen in Swami Vivekananda's Lectures from Colombo to Almora.
