= Deputy Speaker and Chairman of Committees of the Parliament of Sri Lanka =

Presiding officer of the Parliament of Sri Lanka

Deputy Speaker of the Parliament of Sri Lanka
- ශ්‍රී ලංකා පාර්ලි‌මේන්තු නියෝජ්‍ය කථානායක பாராளுமன்ற துணை சபாநாயகர்
- Emblem of Sri Lanka

- Flag of Sri Lanka
- Incumbent; Rizvie Salih since 21 November 2024
- Style: Honourable Deputy Speaker
- Appointer: Parliament of Sri Lanka
- Constituting instrument: Constitution of the Democratic Socialist Republic of Sri Lanka
- Inaugural holder: Forester Augustus Obeysekera
- Formation: 7 July 1931; 95 years ago (as Deputy Speaker of the State Council of Ceylon)
- Deputy: Deputy Chairman of Committees
- Website: www.parliament.lk

The Deputy Speaker and Chairman of Committees is a member of the Parliament of Sri Lanka (and its predecessors the National State Assembly, the House of Representatives and the State Council) who presides over sittings of Parliament in the absence of the Speaker. The current deputy speaker and chairman of committees is Rizvie Salih.

== List of Deputy speakers and chairmen of committees ==
Parties

Independent United National Party Sri Lanka Freedom Party All Ceylon Tamil Congress Mahajana Eksath Peramuna Sri Lanka Podujana Peramuna National People's Power

Deputy Speaker and Chairman of Committees
| Name | Portrait | Party | Took office | Left office | Legislature | Refs |
|---|---|---|---|---|---|---|
| Forester Augustus Obeysekera | | Independent | | | State Council | |
| Susantha de Fonseka | | Independent | | | State Council | |
| R. A. de Mel | | United National Party | 14 October 1947 | 23 August 1948 | House of Representatives | |
| H. W. Amarasuriya | | United National Party | 2 September 1948 | 14 December 1948 | House of Representatives | |
| Albert Peries | | United National Party | 15 December 1948 | 13 February 1951 | House of Representatives | |
| H. S. H. Ismail | | Independent | 14 February 1951 | 8 April 1952 | House of Representatives | |
| H. S. H. Ismail | | Independent | 10 June 1952 | 18 February 1956 | House of Representatives | |
| Piyasena Tennakoon | | Sri Lanka Freedom Party | 20 April 1956 | 16 September 1958 | House of Representatives | |
| R. S. Pelpola | | Sri Lanka Freedom Party | 18 September 1958 | 5 December 1959 | House of Representatives | |
| R. S. Pelpola | | Sri Lanka Freedom Party | 30 March 1960 | 23 April 1960 | House of Representatives | |
| Hugh Fernando | | United National Party | 5 August 1960 | 23 January 1964 | House of Representatives | |
| D. A. Rajapaksa | | Sri Lanka Freedom Party | 11 February 1964 | 12 November 1964 | House of Representatives | |
| Shirley Corea | | United National Party | 5 April 1965 | 17 September 1967 | House of Representatives | |
| Razik Fareed | | Sri Lanka Freedom Party | 28 September 1967 | 28 February 1968 | House of Representatives | |
| M. Sivasithamparam | | All Ceylon Tamil Congress | 8 March 1968 | 25 March 1970 | House of Representatives | |
| I. A. Cader | | Sri Lanka Freedom Party | 7 June 1970 | 22 May 1972 | House of Representatives | |
| I. A. Cader | | Sri Lanka Freedom Party | 22 May 1972 | 18 May 1977 | National State Assembly | |
| M. A. Bakeer Markar | | United National Party | 4 August 1977 | 7 September 1978 | National State Assembly | |
| Norman Waidyaratne | | United National Party | 21 September 1978 | 20 December 1988 | Parliament | |
| Gamini Fonseka | | United National Party | 9 March 1989 | 24 June 1994 | Parliament | |
| Anil Moonesinghe | | Sri Lanka Freedom Party | 24 August 1994 | 18 August 2000 | Parliament | |
| Anil Moonesinghe | | Sri Lanka Freedom Party | 14 September 2000 | 23 September 2000 | Parliament | |
| Sarath Munasinghe | | Sri Lanka Freedom Party | 18 October 2000 | 10 October 2001 | Parliament | |
| Gitanjana Gunawardena | | Mahajana Eksath Peramuna | 18 May 2004 | 1 July 2008 | Parliament | |
| Piyankara Jayaratne | | Sri Lanka Freedom Party | 8 July 2008 | 9 February 2010 | Parliament | |
| Piyankara Jayaratne | | Sri Lanka Freedom Party | 9 March 2010 | 20 April 2010 | Parliament | |
| Piyankara Jayaratne | | Sri Lanka Freedom Party | 22 April 2010 | 22 November 2010 | Parliament | |
| Chandima Weerakkody | | Sri Lanka Freedom Party | 23 November 2010 | 26 June 2015 | Parliament | |
| Thilanga Sumathipala | | Sri Lanka Freedom Party | 1 September 2015 | 8 June 2018 | Parliament | |
| Ananda Kumarasiri | | United National Party | 8 June 2018 | 2 March 2020 | Parliament | |
| Ranjith Siyambalapitiya | | Sri Lanka Freedom Party | 20 August 2020 | 6 May 2022 | Parliament | |
| Ajith Rajapakse | | Sri Lanka Podujana Peramuna | 17 May 2022 | 24 September 2024 | Parliament | |
| Rizvie Salih | | National People's Power | 21 November 2024 | Incumbent | Parliament | |
