= Salaries of members of the Sri Lankan Parliament =

Salaries of Sri Lankan elected office-holders

The monthly allowance of a Member of Parliament (MP) in the Parliament of Sri Lanka is Rs. 54,000 a month as of 2024. In addition, parliamentarians are able to claim allowances for attendance, to cover the costs of running an office and employing staff, and residence which can increase their gross pay to over Rs.270,000. Additional salary is paid for appointments or additional duties, such as ministerial appointments and serving as parliamentary officers.

In November 2024, the government appointed a committee to reform MP perquisites and allowances which amounts to over Rs.1 billion from the annual budget of Parliament of Rs.4–5 billion.

== History ==
The members of the State Council of Ceylon, as well as the members of the Senate of Ceylon and the House of Representatives of Ceylon that replaced the State Council in 1947, received an allowance for their attendance for sessions of the house. Members of the house that were appointed to the Cabinet of Ministers and those elected as officers of the house such as the Speaker were paid a salary determined by the house as was the case in the State Council.

== Current remuneration and benefits ==
As of November 2024, Secretary General of Parliament indicates that a Member of Parliament 17th Parliament of Sri Lanka are entitled to the following remuneration and benefits.

=== Allowances ===
A monthly allowance Rs. 54,000 and a daily allowance of Rs. 2,500 for attending parliamentary meetings and committee meetings on days which parliament is not sitting.

=== Housing ===
Parliamentarians with homes beyond 40 KMs from Parliament are able to request one of 108 houses at the Madiwela Housing Complex.

=== Stationery and stamps ===
Parliamentarians will receive Rs. 100,000 worth of stationery and stamps annually.

=== Security ===
Each Parliamentarian would be issued a pistol for personal protection and assigned two police officers for their protection. The issuing of a personal weapon has been, however temporarily suspended.

=== Pension ===
Under the Parliamentary Pensions Law (Pensions Act of 1977), former members of the legislature since 7 July 1931, their widows and children will be entitled to a non-contributory pension, provided they complete a minimum of five years in one term of Parliament. Those who have completed five years receive a monthly pension of one-third of their salary and those who have completed ten years receive a two-thirds.

== Former benefits ==
As of the 16th Parliament of Sri Lanka, an average MP would have earned more than Rs.270,000 including salary and other benefits, in addition to attendance allowances.

=== Basic salary ===
A Member of Parliament will receive a salary of Rs.54,285 (with a proposed increase to Rs.120,000 from January 2018) paid monthly by the parliament, while Ministers, Deputy Ministers and State Ministers will receive a salary applicable to their grade from their Ministries.

=== Allowances ===
In addition to the monthly salary, MPs are entitled to several additional allowances. MPs who do not hold a ministerial appointment would receive an additional entertainment allowance of Rs.1,000 and drivers allowance (if no driver is allocated by the government) of Rs.3,000 per month. All MPs are entitled to a daily sitting allowance and committee allowance of Rs.2,500 each per sitting.

=== Transport ===
Each member is entitled to a fuel allowance based on the distance from parliament to their electoral district (Colombo 283.94 L; Gampaha and Kaluthara 355.58 L). Historically MPs were issued bus and railway warrants to travel by bus or train to Colombo from their constituencies.

Until 2024 MPs were not entitled to an official vehicle unless they received a ministerial appointment. In such event, they would receive transport from their ministry based on their type of ministerial appointment. During times of vehicle import restrictions, MPs were issued with vehicles such as Mitsubishi Jeeps for constituency work in the 1970s and Toyota Land Cruiser Prados in 2021, something which has caused controversy.

In 2025, the government announced that all members of parliament would be provided with new vehicles, purchased and maintained by the government, following the opening of vehicle imports to the country.

Each member is also entitled to import a high value luxury vehicle with a high engine capacity without paying import duty that is normally charged under a duty-free permit each term of office. Accusations have risen on the misuse of this benefit by members, who allow others to import super luxury vehicles under their name and use. Ministers are also allocated two vehicles from their respective ministry in addition to said privilege.

=== Housing and vacationing ===
Historically MPs from outlying constituencies lodged at Srawasthi Mandiraya in central Colombo which was known as the MP's hostel. In the 1980s with the construction of the Madiwela Housing Complex, members from constituencies from outside Colombo received housing at the Madiwela Housing Complex or an allowance to rent a house. In addition, MPs and their families have exclusive use of the General's House, which is a nineteen-roomed holiday bungalow in Nuwara Eliya maintained by the members' services office of the department of administration of the parliament secretariat.

=== Office expenses ===
Each MP is entitled to a monthly office allowance of Rs.100,000, a telephone allowance of Rs.50,000 and a transport allowance for personal staff of Rs.10,000 for four personal staff to an office. At the start of each term, an MP has an allowance to purchase office equipment such as computers, copiers and fax machines. They are entitled to an annual free postal facility allowance of Rs.350,000, which was increased from Rs.175,000 in 2019.

=== Medical facilities ===
MPs are entitled medical facilities from the Sri Jayawardenepura General Hospital.

=== Other benefits ===
Members claim tax exemptions on their pay and allowances, as they are deemed honoraria. Members are also entitled to subsidized meals in the members' dining area at parliament. Young members of Parliament without higher educational qualifications receive direct admission to the Sri Lanka Law College without having to pass its entrance exam.

== See also ==
- Salaries of members of the United Kingdom Parliament
