= Protus Tissera =

Ceylonese politician (1925–2007)

Hon. Protus Tissera

Member of Parliament for Nattandiya
- In office 1970–1977
- Preceded by: Hugh Fernando
- Succeeded by: Harold Herath

Personal details
- Born: Warnakulasuriya Philip Antony Protus Tissera; 11 September 1925 British Ceylon
- Died: 14 October 2007 (aged 82) Katuneriya, Sri Lanka
- Party: Sri Lanka Freedom Party
- Spouse: Anyshia
- Relations: Benedict Tissera (father); Corilethina née Dabarera (mother); Matildus Anicetus (sister); Pracksid (brother)
- Children: Dayasritha, Shanthi, Sunitha, Kamani, Sudarshani, Susil, Pushpanath and Laksiri

Warnakulasuriya Philip Antony Protus Tissera (11 September 1925 – 14 October 2007) was a Sri Lankan politician.

Tissera was born 11 September 1925, the son of Benedict Tissera and Corilethina née Dabarera. He was educated at the R. C. School, Katuneriya, Joseph Vaz College, Wennappuwa, St. Sebastian's College, Moratuwa and St. Mary's College, Chilaw.

He served as a member of the Kammalpattu Village Committee.

Tissera contested the 6th parliamentary elections held on 22 March 1965 for the Nattandiya electorate, as the Sri Lanka Freedom Party candidate. He lost to the incumbent, Albert Peries by 5,409 votes. Following Peries' death in September 1967 a by-election for his seat was held on 5 January 1968, at which Tissera ran again, losing to the United National Party candidate, Hugh Fernando, by 260 votes. Tissera was elected to parliament the 7th parliamentary elections held on 27 May 1970, where he defeated Fernando by 1,450 votes, securing 52% of the total vote.
