= Harindra Corea =

Sri Lankan politician (1936–2005)

Minister of State for Ports and Telecommunication
- In office 18 February 1989 – 16 August 1994
- President: Dingiri Banda Wijetunga; Ranasinghe Premadasa
- Prime Minister: Ranil Wickremesinghe; Dingiri Banda Wijetunga

Deputy Minister of Foreign Affairs
- In office 2000–2001
- President: Chandrika Kumaratunga
- Prime Minister: Ratnasiri Wickremanayake

Deputy Minister of Public Administration
- In office 1980–1989
- President: J. R. Jayewardene
- Prime Minister: Ranasinghe Premadasa

Member of Parliament for Chilaw
- In office 1977–1988
- Preceded by: S. D. R. Jayaratne
- Succeeded by: Constituency Abolished

Personal details
- Born: 4 March 1936 Colombo, British Ceylon
- Died: 21 October 2005 (aged 69) Colombo, Sri Lanka
- Party: United National Party
- Other political affiliations: People's Alliance
- Spouse: Rochelle Corea
- Children: Sheonie, Harindrini
- Parent(s): Claude Corea; Lylie Corea
- Education: S. Thomas College, Preparatory School, Bandarawela, St Paul's School, London, University College, Oxford
- Occupation: politician
- Profession: Lawyer

Harindra Jayantha Corea (4 March 1936 – 21 October 2005) was a Sri Lankan politician and Member of Parliament, who represented Chilaw. He was member of the United National Party of Sri Lanka. His parents were Sir Claude Corea who was renowned politician and diplomat and Lady Karmini Corea. Sir Claude was Minister of Labour in the State Council of Ceylon led by DS Senanayake, and was appointed the first ever Representative of Ceylon to the UK (before Independence) and was also Ceylon's first Ambassador in the United States. Harindra Corea was the brother of Nihal Corea and Chandra Corea. The family home was situated in Alfred House Gardens in Colombo.

== Education ==
Corea grew up in the UK and attended St Paul's School, London. He went on to study Politics, Philosophy and Economics (PPE) at the University College, Oxford. He was then called to the Bar by the Honorable Society of the Inner Temple.

== Political career ==
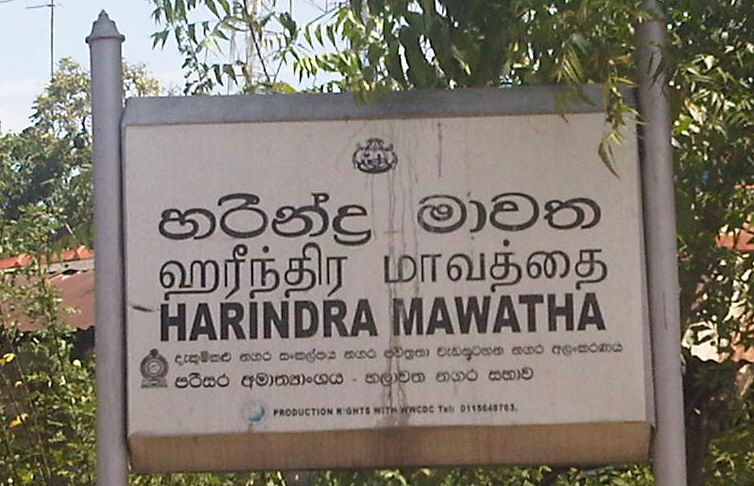
Harindra Mawatha in Chilaw, Sri Lanka – the road was named after Harindra Corea M.P.

He won the Chilaw seat in the 1977 General Elections on the UNP ticket, following in the footsteps of his uncle, Srikuradas Charles Shirley Corea who won the parliamentary seat of Chilaw in 1952.

The Coat of Arms of the Parliament of Sri Lanka. Harindra Corea represented Chilaw in parliament – first with the United National Party and later on with the People's Alliance.

Corea was appointed Minister of Telecommunications by President Ranasinghe Premadasa in the 1990s. After a disagreement with the UNP he crossed over to the People's Alliance Government under President Chandrika Kumaratunga in 2000. The Sunday Times of Sri Lanka noted 'the parliamentary debate on the draft constitution saw cross-overs from Dixon J. Perera, Harindra Corea and Mervyn Silva. He was selected as a People's Alliance national list candidate.

Harindra Corea was appointed Deputy Foreign Minister by President Chandrika Kumaratunga and travelled around the world representing Sri Lanka. Among the many duties undertaken as Deputy Foreign Minister, he opened the office of the Hony. Consulate General for Cyprus in Colombo, Sri Lanka in December 2000.

== Descendant of King Dominicus Corea (Edirille Rala) ==
Harindra Corea took a keen interest in the wider Corea Family. He headed the Edirimanne Corea Family Union in Sri Lanka in 2000. He was a descendant of King Dominicus Corea, also known as Edirille Rala.

== Jazz Music ==
Corea was an accomplished jazz musician and he was a fan of some of the 'greats' in jazz music, among them Louis Armstrong and Duke Ellington (who visited Sri Lanka in 1963). Chamikara Weerasinghe writing in the Daily News in Sri Lanka, observed that 'Among those who promoted jazz music in Sri Lanka are Tommy Perera, Tita Nathaniez, Mahes Perera, former Minister Harindra Corea and Bala Namasvayam.'

== Death ==
Corea died in Colombo on 21 October 2005. Parliamentarians held a Vote of Condolence when he died, speaking about his achievements in the Parliament of Sri Lanka in Kotte. The citizens of Chilaw have named a sports ground in the town, in memory of their Member of Parliament who served them since 1977.

== See also ==
- Dominicus Corea
- Edirille Bandara
- Claude Corea
- List of political families in Sri Lanka
- Edirimanne Corea Family Union
- Mahatma Gandhi's visit to Chilaw, Sri Lanka
- Parliament of Sri Lanka

== Bibliography ==
- Handbook of the Parliament of Sri Lanka
- Great Sinhalese Men and Women of History – Edirille Bandara (Domingos Corea) By John M. Senaveratna, (1937)
- Twentieth Century Impressions of Ceylon: Its History, People, Commerce, Industries and Resources By A.W. Wright, Asian Educational Services, India; New Ed edition (15 December 2007)
