= 1st Parliament of Ceylon =

1947–1952 meeting of the Sri Lankan legislature

←	2nd	2nd	→

Overview
- Legislative body: Parliament of Ceylon
- Term: 14 October 1947 – 8 April 1952
- Election: 23 August – 20 September 1947

Senior parliamentarians
- Speaker: Alexander Francis Molamure, UNP (1947–51); Albert Peries, UNP (1951–52)
- Deputy Speaker and Chairman of Committees: R. A. de Mel, UNP (1947–48); H. W. Amarasuriya, UNP (1948); Albert Peries, UNP (1948–51); Hameed Hussain Sheikh Ismail, (1951–52)
- Deputy Chairman of Committees: J. A. Martensz, (1947–48); Hameed Hussain Sheikh Ismail, (1949–51); T. Ramalingam, ACTC (1951–52)
- Prime Minister: D. S. Senanayake, UNP (1947–52); Dudley Senanayake, UNP (1952)
- Leader of the Opposition: N. M. Perera, LSSP
- Leader of the House: S. W. R. D. Bandaranaike, UNP (1947–51); John Kotelawala, UNP (1951–52)
- Chief Government Whip: Senerat Gunewardene, UNP (1947–48); A. Ekanayake Gunasinha, CLP (1948–52)

Sessions
- 1st: 14 October 1947 – 31 January 1948
- 2nd: 10 February 1948 – 17 June 1949
- 3rd: 12 July 1949 – 6 April 1950
- 4th: 20 June 1950 – 24 April 1951
- 5th: 20 June 1951 – 8 April 1952

The 1st Parliament of Ceylon was a meeting of the Parliament of Ceylon, with the membership determined by the results of the 1947 parliamentary election between 23 August and 20 September 1947. The parliament met for the first time on 14 October 1947 and was dissolved on 8 April 1952.

== Members ==
- J. R. Jayewardene – Minister of Finance
- S. W. R. D. Bandaranaike – Minister of Health
- T. B. Jayah (1947–1950)

== Sources ==
- "Result of Parliamentary General Election 1947" (PDF). Department of Elections, Sri Lanka.
- "Duration of Parliament". Parliament of Sri Lanka.
- "Prime Ministers". Parliament of Sri Lanka.
- "Speakers". Parliament of Sri Lanka.
- "Deputy Speaker and Chairman of Committees". Parliament of Sri Lanka.
- "Deputy Chairman of Committees". Parliament of Sri Lanka.
- "Leaders of the Opposition". Parliament of Sri Lanka.
- "Leaders of the House". Parliament of Sri Lanka.
- "Chief Government Whips". Parliament of Sri Lanka.
- "Chief Opposition Whips". Parliament of Sri Lanka.
- "Sessions of Parliament". Parliament of Sri Lanka.
