= 3rd Parliament of Ceylon =

1956–1959 meeting of the Sri Lankan legislature

←	4th	6th	→

Overview
- Legislative body: Parliament of Ceylon
- Term: 19 April 1956 – 5 December 1959
- Election: 5–10 April 1956

Senior parliamentarians
- Speaker: Hameed Hussain Sheikh Ismail
- Deputy Speaker and Chairman of Committees: Piyasena Tennakoon, SLFP (1956–58); R. S. Pelpola, SLFP (1958–59)
- Deputy Chairman of Committees: R. S. Pelpola, SLFP (1956–58); L. S. Jinasena, UNP (1958–59)
- Prime Minister: S. W. R. D. Bandaranaike, SLFP (1956–59); Wijeyananda Dahanayake, MEP (1959)
- Leader of the Opposition: N. M. Perera, LSSP
- Leader of the House: C. P. de Silva, SLFP
- Chief Government Whip: W. J. C. Moonesinghe, SLFP

Sessions
- 1st: 19 April 1956 – 3 May 1957
- 2nd: 13 June 1957 – 15 May 1958
- 3rd: 4 June 1958 – 23 May 1959
- 4th: 30 June 1959 – 5 December 1959

The 3rd Parliament of Ceylon was a meeting of the Parliament of Ceylon, with the membership determined by the results of the 1956 parliamentary election between 5 and 10 April 1956. The parliament met for the first time on 19 April 1956 and was dissolved on 5 December 1959.
