= House of Representatives (Ceylon) =

- Dominion of Ceylon

Type
- Type: Lower house

History
- Established: 1947
- Disbanded: 1972
- Preceded by: State Council of Ceylon
- Succeeded by: National State Assembly
- Seats: 101 (1947-1960); 157 (1960-1972)

Elections
- Last election: 1970 Ceylonese parliamentary election

Meeting place
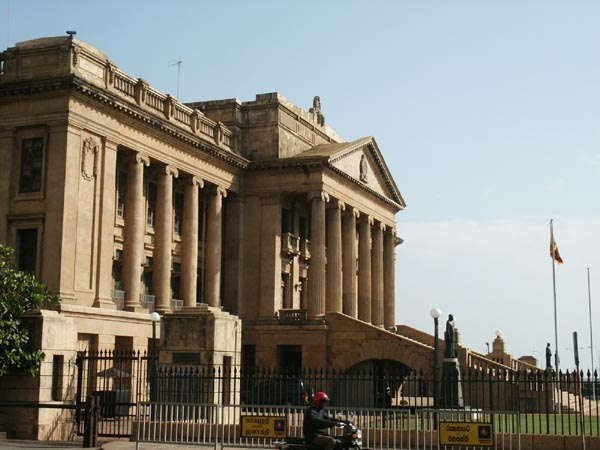
- The State Council building in Galle Face Green, Colombo. The building was used by the State Council's successors (the House of Representatives, National State Assembly, and Parliament of Sri Lanka) until 1982. Today it is known as the Old Parliament Building and houses the Presidential Secretariat.

The House of Representatives was the lower chamber of the parliament of Ceylon (now Sri Lanka) established in 1947 by the Soulbury Constitution. The House was housed in the old State Council building in Galle Face Green, Colombo and met for the first time on 14 October 1947. The First Republican Constitution of Sri Lanka, adopted on 22 May 1972, replaced the House of Representatives (and Parliament of Ceylon) with the unicameral National State Assembly.

== Membership ==
The House of Representatives initially consisted of 101 members, of whom 95 were elected by the electors of the 89 electoral districts and six appointed by the Governor-General, on the advice of the Prime Minister. The members were known as "Members of Parliament". The six appointed members represented important interests which were not represented or inadequately represented in the House, they were usually from the European and Burgher communities and on occasions from the Indian Tamils and Muslim (Moors or Malays) groups. On a few occasions caste groups from within the Sinhalese and Tamils also obtained representation in Parliament as appointed members.

The fourth amendment to the Soulbury Constitution increased the number of members to 157 (151 elected from 145 electoral districts and six appointed).

== Electoral districts ==
The initial 89 electoral districts consisted of 84 single-member districts, four two-member districts (Ambalangoda-Balapitiya, Badulla, Balangoda and Kadugannawa) and one three-member district (Colombo Central). From March 1960 there were 145 electoral districts consisting of 140 single-member districts, four two-member districts (Akurana, Batticaloa, Colombo South and Mutur) and one three-member district (Colombo Central).

== Speakers ==
- Alfred Francis Molamure (1947–51)
- Albert F. Peries (1951–56)
- H. S. Ismail (1956–59)
- T. B. Subasinghe (1960)
- R. S. Pelpola (1960–64)
- Hugh Fernando (1964)
- Albert F. Peries (1965–67)
- Shirley Corea (1967–70)
- Stanley Tillekeratne (1970–72)

== Deputy Speaker and Chairman of Committees ==
- R. A. de Mel (1947–48)
- H. W. Amarasuriya (1948)
- Albert F. Peries (1948–51)
- H. S. Ismail (1951–56)
- Piyasena Tennakoon (1956–58)
- R. S. Pelpola (1958–60)
- Hugh Fernando (1960–64)
- D. A. Rajapaksa (1964)
- Shirley Corea (1965–67)
- Razik Fareed (1967–68)
- Murugesu Sivasithamparam (1968–70)
- I. A. Cader (1970–72)

== See also ==
- Legislative Council of Ceylon
- National State Assembly
- Parliament of Ceylon
- Parliament of Sri Lanka
- Senate of Ceylon
- State Council of Ceylon
