= J. J. Fernando =

Ceylonese politician

Hon. J. J. Fernando MP

Member of the Ceylon Parliament for Chilaw
- In office 1947–1952
- Preceded by: seat created
- Succeeded by: Shirley Corea

Personal details
- Born: Mihindukulasuriya Julian Joseph Fernando; 15 August 1896
- Died: Ceylon
- Occupation: Attorney at Law
- Profession: law, politics

Mihindukulasuriya Julian Joseph Fernando (born 15 August 1896) was a Ceylonese politician.

In 1947 Fernando was elected to the Parliament of Ceylon at the 1st parliamentary election, in the Chilaw electorate, as an independent candidate. He secured 6,270 votes (35% of the total vote), defeating 4 other candidates to win the seat.

Fernando was unable to hold the seat at the 2nd parliamentary election held in May 1952, where he was defeated by the United National Party candidate, Shirley Corea, and the Sri Lanka Freedom Party candidate, W. J. C. Munasinha, who received 10,260 votes and 10,206 votes respectively, as opposed to Fernando's 5,027 votes.
