= Hugh Fernando =

Sri Lankan politician (1916–1992)

Hon. Hugh Fernando

8th Speaker of the Parliament
- In office 24 January 1964 – 17 December 1964
- Prime Minister: Sirimavo Bandaranaike
- Preceded by: R. S. Pelpola
- Succeeded by: Albert Peries

Member of the Ceylon Parliament for Nattandiya
- In office 1956–1960
- Preceded by: Albert Peries
- Succeeded by: Albert Peries

Member of the Ceylon Parliament for Wennappuwa
- In office 1960–1965
- Preceded by: seat created
- Succeeded by: Festus Perera

Member of the Ceylon Parliament for Nattandiya
- In office 1968–1970
- Preceded by: Albert Peries
- Succeeded by: Harold Herath

Personal details
- Born: 17 November 1916
- Died: 2 April 1992 (aged 75) Ratnapura
- Party: United National Party; Sri Lanka Freedom Party

Warnakulasuriya Ichchampullige Hugh Fernando (17 November 1916 -2 April 1992) was a Sri Lankan politician born in Nainamadama. He was the Speaker of the Sri Lankan Parliament.

In 1952 he contested election from Nattandiya electoral district as an independent candidate and lost to former speaker Albert Peries by 306 votes. Hugh was determined to defeat Peries in the next elections. By keeping to the proverb "failures are the pillars of success" he organised well in the electoral district. He started workers' unions and many other societies and thereby strengthened his power. He published a newspaper called Janatha Hatana (struggle of workers) which contained good news about workers.

At the 1956 general elections Fernando contested the Nattandiya electorate again as an independent candidate. He contacted a communicable disease and could not attend election meetings. Following medical advice he stayed at home. His 10-year-old daughter Ivy addressed meetings on behalf of her father. When the result was announced at this Puttalam Kachcheri, Fernando was declared the winner by a comfortable majority and was appointed as Parliamentary Secretary to the Minister of Agriculture & Food by Prime Minister S. W. R. D. Bandaranaike. In March 1960 he contested newly created Wennappuwa electorate and was elected Deputy Chairman of Committees. In the same year's July election he won it and was elected as Deputy Speaker & Chairman of Committees.

In 1964 following the resignation of Speaker R. S. Pelpola Fernando was elected eighth Speaker of the Parliament. When the Press Bill to take over Lake House was presented in parliament in December, the votes were equally divided and Fernando gave his famous deciding vote against and defeated the bill. Consequently, the Sirimavo Bandaranaike government had it resign.

Hugh did not contest at the 1965 general elections when the United National Party government came into power Hugh was appointed Sri Lanka High Commissioner in Pakistan. When Sir Albert Peries the Speaker and MP for Nattandiya died in 1968 Fernando returned to Sri Lanka and was elected at the by-election for the Nattandiya electorate. Fernando was then appointed Minister of Trade and Commerce in the Prime Minister Dudley Senanayake's cabinet.

Fernando did not contest a seat in the 1977 general elections.

Consequently, he crossed over to the Sri Lanka Freedom Party and became their chief organiser in the Puttalam District. He took part in a giant walk called 'Pada Yathra' from Colombo to Kataragama organised by the then deputy leader of opposition Mahinda Rajapaksa to protest against some undemocratic activities of the UNP government. Whilst taking part in the walk Fernando fell ill and was admitted to Ratnapura hospital where he died on 2 April 1992.
