= Larine Perera =

Sri Lankan politician

Hon. Larine Perera MP

Member of Parliament for Puttalam District
- In office 2001–2010

Personal details
- Party: United National Party
- Other political affiliations: United National Front

Mary Larine Perera (1944-2016) is a Sri Lankan politician and a former member of the Parliament of Sri Lanka and Minister of the Wayamba Provincial Council. She was married to former minister Festus Perera and Niroshan Perera is her son.
