= S. D. R. Jayaratne =

Sri Lankan politician (1931–2011)

Silva Dedinuni Robert Jayaratne (1931–2011) was a Sri Lankan politician. He served as the Deputy Minister of Fisheries and was a Member of Parliament from the Chilaw.

== Career ==
He first contested unsuccessfully in the 1960 March general elections and then contested from the Sri Lanka Freedom Party in the 1960 July general elections in the Chilaw electorate and was elected to the House of Representatives defeating W. J. C. Munasinha. He was defeated by Shirley Corea in the 1965 general elections, was able to be elected in the 1970 general elections defeating Shirley Corea. He was appointed Deputy Minister of Fisheries by Prime Minister Sirma Bandaranaike and became Minister of Fisheries in 1976 (after the death of George Rajapaksa).

He was defeated in the 1977 general elections. He was re-elected in the 1989 general elections and 1994 general elections from the Puttalam Electoral District.

His son Piyankara Jayaratne is a serving Member of Parliament from the Puttalam Electoral District.
