= Chilaw Electoral District =

Electoral district of Sri Lanka

Chilaw electoral district was an electoral district of Sri Lanka between August 1947 and February 1989. The district was named after the town of Chilaw in Puttalam District, North Western Province. The 1978 Constitution of Sri Lanka introduced the proportional representation electoral system for electing members of Parliament. The existing 160 mainly single-member electoral districts were replaced with 22 multi-member electoral districts. Chilaw electoral district was replaced by the Puttalam multi-member electoral district at the 1989 general elections, the first under the proportional representation system.

== Members of Parliament ==
Key

Independent SLFP UNP

Election	Member	Party	Term
1947	J. J. Fernando	Ind.	
1952	Shirley Corea	UNP	
1956	W. J. C. Munasinha	SLFP	
1960 (March)	W. J. C. Munasinha	SLFP	
1960 (July)	S. D. R. Jayaratne		
1965	Shirley Corea		
1970	S. D. R. Jayaratne		
1977	Harindra Corea		

== Elections ==
=== 1947 Parliamentary General Election ===
Results of the 1st parliamentary election held between 23 August 1947 and 20 September 1947 for the district:

Candidate	Party	Symbol	Votes	%
J. J. Fernando	Independent	Elephant	6,270	34.99
W. J. C. Munasinha	Independent	Cartwheel	4,235	23.63
C. A. Abeyratne	United National Party	Star	3,376	18.84
H. Gunasekera	Independent	Umbrella	2,118	11.82
C. E. Victor S. Corea	Independent	Flower	1,744	9.73
Valid Votes			17,743	99.02
Rejected Votes			176	0.98
Total Polled			17,919	100.00
Registered Electors			31,053	
Turnout				57.70

=== 1952 Parliamentary General Election ===
Results of the 2nd parliamentary election held between 24 May 1952 and 30 May 1952 for the district:

Candidate	Party	Symbol	Votes	%
Shirley Corea	United National Party	Elephant	10,260	39.38
W. J. C. Munasinha	Sri Lanka Freedom Party	Wheel	10,206	39.17
J. J. Fernando	Independent	Star	5,027	19.29
A. M. L. Appuhamy	Rep	Bicycle	341	1.31
Valid Votes			25,834	99.16
Rejected Votes			220	0.84
Total Polled			26,054	100.00
Registered Electors			35,917	
Turnout				72.54

=== 1956 Parliamentary General Election ===
Results of the 3rd parliamentary election held between 5 April 1956 and 10 April 1956 for the district:

Candidate	Party	Symbol	Votes	%
W. J. C. Munasinha	Sri Lanka Freedom Party	Hand	19,565	62.02
Shirley Corea	United National Party	Elephant	11,831	37.50
Valid Votes			31,396	99.53
Rejected Votes			149	0.47
Total Polled			31,545	100.00
Registered Electors			40,672	
Turnout				77.56

=== 1960 (March) Parliamentary General Election ===
Results of the 4th parliamentary election held on 19 March 1960 for the district:

Candidate	Party	Symbol	Votes	%
W. J. C. Munasinha	Sri Lanka Freedom Party	Hand	9,302	38.57
S. D. R. Jayaratne		Sun	4,527	18.77
Patronius Fernando	United National Party	Elephant	4,364	18.10
R. H. Randeny		Key	2,843	11.79
J. J. Fernando	Independent	Umbrella	1,978	8.20
M. Cyril Fernando		Spectacles	587	2.43
H. D. S. Jayasekera		Scales	313	1.30
Valid Votes			23,914	99.16
Rejected Votes			203	0.84
Total Polled			24,117	100.00
Registered Electors			31,364	
Turnout				76.89

=== 1960 (July) Parliamentary General Election ===
Results of the 5th parliamentary election held on 20 July 1960 for the district:

Candidate	Party	Symbol	Votes	%
S. D. R. Jayaratne		Hand	10,893	49.69
W. J. C. Munasinha		Eye	8,643	39.42
Francis Perera		House	2,278	10.39
Valid Votes			21,814	99.49
Rejected Votes			110	0.50
Total Polled			21,924	100.00
Registered Electors			31,364	
Turnout				69.90

=== 1965 Parliamentary General Election ===
Results of the 6th parliamentary election held on 22 March 1965 for the district:

Candidate	Party	Symbol	Votes	%
Shirley Corea		Elephant	15,546	49.08
S. D. R. Jayaratne		Hand	13,769	43.47
W. J. C. Munasinha		Eye	2,021	6.38
M. M. Adikari		Sun	107	0.34
Valid Votes			31,443	99.26
Rejected Votes			233	0.74
Total Polled			31,676	100.00
Registered Electors			37,805	
Turnout				83.79

=== 1970 Parliamentary General Election ===
Results of the 7th parliamentary election held on 27 May 1970 for the district:

Candidate	Party	Symbol	Votes	%
S. D. R. Jayaratne		Hand	23,203	55.51
Shirley Corea		Elephant	18,419	44.06
Valid Votes			41,622	99.57
Rejected Votes			180	0.43
Total Polled			41,802	100.00
Registered Electors			49,184	
Turnout				84.99

=== 1977 Parliamentary General Election ===
Results of the 8th parliamentary election held on 21 July 1977 for the district:

Candidate	Party	Symbol	Votes	%
Harindra Corea		Elephant	25,269	55.27
S. D. R. Jayaratne		Hand	19,462	42.57
Leslie de Silva		Key	669	1.46
E. de S. Amarasekara		Flower	133	0.29
T. Pathiraja		Umbrella	48	0.11
Wimalasiri Susewhewa		Cartwheel	40	0.09
Valid Votes			45,621	99.78
Rejected Votes			102	0.22
Total Polled			45,723	100.00
Registered Electors			51,172	
Turnout				89.15
