= Puttalam Electoral District (1947–1989) =

Electoral district of Sri Lanka

Puttalam electoral district was an electoral district of Sri Lanka between August 1947 and February 1989. The district was named after the City of Puttalam in Puttalam District, North Western Province. The 1978 Constitution of Sri Lanka introduced the proportional representation electoral system for electing members of Parliament. The existing 160 mainly single-member electoral districts were replaced with 22 multi-member electoral districts. Puttalam electoral district was replaced by the Puttalam multi-member electoral district at the 1989 general elections, the first under the proportional representation system, Puttalam continues to be a polling division of the multi-member electoral district.

== Members of Parliament ==
Key

Independent SLFP UNP

Election	Member	Party	Term
1947	H. S. Ismail	Independent	1947-1952
1952	H. S. Ismail	Independent	1952-1956
1956	H. S. Ismail	Independent	1956-1960
1960 (March)	M. H. M. Naina Marikar	United National Party	1960
1960 (July)	M. H. M. Naina Marikar	United National Party	1960-1965
1965	M. H. M. Naina Marikar	United National Party	1965-1970
1970	S. M. Asenkudhoos	Sri Lanka Freedom Party	1970-1977
1977	M. H. M. Naina Marikar	United National Party	1977-1989

== Elections ==
=== 1947 Parliamentary General Election ===
Candidate	Party	Symbol	Votes	%
Hameed Hussain Sheikh Ismail	Independent		uncontested	
Valid Votes				100.00%
Rejected Votes				
Total Polled				
Registered Electors				
Turnout				

=== 1952 Parliamentary General Election ===
Candidate	Party	Symbol	Votes	%
Valid Votes				100.00%
Rejected Votes				
Total Polled				
Registered Electors				
Turnout				

=== 1956 Parliamentary General Election ===
Candidate	Party	Symbol	Votes	%
Valid Votes				100.00%
Rejected Votes				
Total Polled				
Registered Electors				
Turnout				

=== 1960 (March) Parliamentary General Election ===
Candidate	Party	Symbol	Votes	%
Valid Votes				100.00%
Rejected Votes				
Total Polled				
Registered Electors				
Turnout				

=== 1960 (July) Parliamentary General Election ===
Candidate	Party	Symbol	Votes	%
Valid Votes				100.00%
Rejected Votes				
Total Polled				
Registered Electors				
Turnout				

=== 1965 Parliamentary General Election ===
Candidate	Party	Symbol	Votes	%
Valid Votes				100.00%
Rejected Votes				
Total Polled				
Registered Electors				
Turnout				

=== 1970 Parliamentary General Election ===
Candidate	Party	Symbol	Votes	%
Valid Votes				100.00%
Rejected Votes				
Total Polled				
Registered Electors				
Turnout				

=== 1977 Parliamentary General Election ===
Candidate	Party	Symbol	Votes	%
Valid Votes				100.00%
Rejected Votes				
Total Polled				
Registered Electors				
Turnout				
