= Nattandiya Electoral District =

Electoral district in Sri Lanka, replaced in 1989

Nattandiya electoral district was an electoral district of Sri Lanka between August 1947 and February 1989. The district was named after the town of Nattandiya in Puttalam District, North Western Province. The 1978 Constitution of Sri Lanka introduced the proportional representation electoral system for electing members of Parliament. The existing 160 mainly single-member electoral districts were replaced with 22 multi-member electoral districts. Nattandiya electoral district was replaced by the Puttalam multi-member electoral district at the 1989 general elections, the first under the proportional representation system, continues to be a polling division of the multi-member electoral district.

== Members of Parliament ==
Key

Independent SLFP UNP

Election	Member	Party	Term
1947	Albert Peries	United National Party	1947-1952
1952	Albert Peries	United National Party	1952-1956
1956	Hugh Fernando	Independent	1956-1960
1960 (March)	Albert Peries	United National Party	1960
1960 (July)	Albert Peries	United National Party	1960-1965
1965	Albert Peries	United National Party	1965-1970
1970	Protus Tissera	Sri Lanka Freedom Party	1970-1977
1977	Harold Herath	United National Party	1977-1982

== Elections ==
=== 1947 Parliamentary General Election ===
Candidate	Party	Symbol	Votes	%
Albert Peries	United National Party	Bicycle	11,036	54.32
D. Peter Perera		Key	8,124	40.00
W. A. V. Jayatilake		Elephant	818	4.03
Valid Votes			19,978	98.33
Rejected Votes			339	1.67
Total Polled			20,317	100.00
Registered Electors			34,025	
Turnout				59.71

=== 1952 Parliamentary General Election ===
Candidate	Party	Symbol	Votes	%
Albert Peries	United National Party	Bicycle	14,593	50.17
Hugh Fernando	Independent	Star	14,287	49.12
Valid Votes			28,880	99.28
Rejected Votes			208	0.72
Total Polled			29,088	100.00
Registered Electors			35,933	
Turnout				80.95

=== 1956 Parliamentary General Election ===
Candidate	Party	Symbol	Votes	%
Hugh Fernando	Independent	Flower	17,607	54.54
Albert Peries	United National Party	Bicycle	14,510	44.95
Valid Votes			32,117	99.50
Rejected Votes			163	0.50
Total Polled			32,280	100.00
Registered Electors			39,783	
Turnout				81.14

=== 1960 (March) Parliamentary General Election ===
Candidate	Party	Symbol	Votes	%
Valid Votes				100.00%
Rejected Votes				
Total Polled				
Registered Electors				
Turnout				

=== 1960 (July) Parliamentary General Election ===
Candidate	Party	Symbol	Votes	%
Valid Votes				100.00%
Rejected Votes				
Total Polled				
Registered Electors				
Turnout				

=== 1965 Parliamentary General Election ===
Candidate	Party	Symbol	Votes	%
Albert Peries	United National Party	Elephant	16,066	59.45
Protus Tissera	Sri Lanka Freedom Party	Hand	10,657	39.43
W. F. C. Weerasuriya		Lamp	150	0.56
Valid Votes			26,873	99.44
Rejected Votes			152	0.56
Total Polled			27,025	100.00
Registered Electors			31,528	
Turnout				85.72

=== 1970 Parliamentary General Election ===
Candidate	Party	Symbol	Votes	%
Protus Tissera	Sri Lanka Freedom Party	Hand	16,437	52.00
Hugh Fernando	United National Party	Elephant	14,987	47.40
W. George Fernando		Bell	131	0.41
Valid Votes			31,555	99.80
Rejected Votes			62	0.20
Total Polled			31,617	100.00
Registered Electors			35,496	
Turnout				89.07

=== 1977 Parliamentary General Election ===
Candidate	Party	Symbol	Votes	%
Harold Herath	United National Party	Elephant	20,228	55.59
Protus Tissera	Sri Lanka Freedom Party	Hand	13,780	37.87
Hugh Fernando		Flower	1,399	3.85
Alex Fernando		Key	426	1.17
D. M. Ariyaratne		Chair	327	0.90
U. A. William		Rabbit	111	0.31
Arunadeva Warnakulasuriya		Cartwheel	84	0.23
Lodwin Fernando		Scales	32	0.09
Valid Votes			36,307	99.79
Rejected Votes			78	0.21
Total Polled			36,385	100.00
Registered Electors			41,386	
Turnout				87.92
