= Niroshan Perera =

Sri Lankan politician

Hon. Niroshan Perera MP
- නිරෝෂන් පෙරේරා நிரோஷன் பெரேரா

Member of Parliament for Puttalam District
- In office 22 April 2010 – 24 September 2024

Personal details
- Party: Samagi Jana Balawegaya (2020-Present); United National Party

Niroshan Perera is a Sri Lankan politician, a member of the Parliament of Sri Lanka. He belongs to the United National Party. He is the son of Festus Perera and Larine Perera.
