= M. W. R. de Silva =

Sri Lankan lawyer (born 1900)

Hon. M. W. R. de Silva

Member of the Ceylon Parliament for Gampola
- In office 1952–1956
- Preceded by: R. S. Pelpola
- Succeeded by: R. S. Pelpola

Deputy Chairman of Committees
- In office 9 June 1952 – 18 February 1956
- Preceded by: T. Ramalingam
- Succeeded by: R. S. Pelpola

Personal details
- Born: Manikka Wadu Richard de Silva; 18 November 1900 Ambalangoda, Ceylon
- Party: United National Party
- Children: Iranee (daughter)
- Occupation: Lawyer, politician

Manikka Wadu Richard de Silva (18 November 1900 - ?) was a Ceylonese lawyer and politician.

Manikka Wadu Richard de Silva was born on 18 November 1900 in Ambalangoda, Ceylon. He served as the president of Youth Buddhist Association of Gampola, and in 1942 was a founding member of the Law Society of Ceylon.

De Silva ran as the United National Party candidate in the seat of Gampola at the 2nd parliamentary election, held between 24 May 1952 and 30 May 1952. He defeated both the Sri Lanka Freedom Party candidate, P. M. Jayasena, and the sitting member, R. S. Pelpola, polling 7,950 votes (43% of the total vote) against their 5,313 votes and 2,352 votes respectively. He was subsequently elected Deputy Chairman of Committees, a position he retained until February 1956.

He contested the 3rd parliamentary election, held between 5 April 1956 and 10 April 1956, but failed to retain his seat, losing to Pelpola, who ran as the Sri Lanka Freedom Party candidate, 4,302 votes to 13,143 votes.
