= Senerat Gunewardene =

Sri Lankan lawyer, statesmen and diplomat (1899–1981)

Hon. Sir Senerat Gunewardene

Minister without Portfolio
- In office 26 September 1947 – May 1948
- Preceded by: Post created
- Succeeded by: A. E. Gunasinha

Member of the Ceylon Parliament for Gampola
- In office 1947–1948
- Preceded by: Seat created
- Succeeded by: R. S. Pelpola

Personal details
- Born: 3 September 1899 Matara, Ceylon
- Died: 10 August 1981 (aged 81)
- Spouse: Sumana Pemi Gunewardene
- Children: 3
- Parent: Don Bentis Serasinghe Gunewardene (father)
- Education: St.Thomas' College, Matara S. Thomas' College, Mount Lavinia
- Occupation: Politics, Diplomat
- Profession: Advocate

Sir Senerat Gunewardene (also known as Ratnakirti Senerat Serasinghe Gunewardene or R.S.S. Gunewardene) (3 November 1899 – 10 August 1981) was a Sri Lankan lawyer, statesmen and diplomat. He was the first Minister without Portfolio, member of parliament and member of the State Council for Gampola, before serving in several top diplomatic posts such as Ceylon's Ambassador to Italy, Ceylon's Ambassador to the United States, where he was appointed concurrently as Ceylon's first Permanent Representative to United Nations and Ceylon's High Commissioner to United Kingdom.

== Early life and education ==
Born on 3 November 1899 in Nupe, Matara as Samson Gunewardene, he later changed his name to Ratnakirthi Senerath Serasinghe Gunewardene and was known as R. S. S. Gunewardene. His father Don Bentis Serasinghe Gunewardene was an ayurvedic practitioner, he was the eldest in a family of three brothers and one sister. Both his brothers became lawyers and one went on to become a District Judge. Educated at St. Thomas' College, Matara and at S. Thomas' College, Mount Lavinia, where he was a good friend of S. W. R. D. Bandaranaike.

== Teaching career ==
He had to leave school before completing his schooling due to the death of his father. Returning to Matara, in order to support himself and his family, he became a teacher at St. Thomas' College, Matara at the age of 16. He thereafter earned a Bachelor of Arts degree from the University of London as an external student and joined the teaching staff of Royal College Colombo. Thereafter, he served as principal of Sri Sumangala College, Panadura from 1921 to 1922.

== Legal career ==
He started following the advocate's course at the Ceylon Law College and passed his advocate's finals in 1926. He was admitted to the bar as an Advocate in 1927. After qualifying as an advocate, Gunewardene gave up teaching and developed a successful legal practice in criminal defense and civil rights in the unofficial bar in Colombo. He was also a founder member and President of the All-Ceylon Buddhist Congress and was a member of the first board of management of the Colombo Young men's Buddhist Association.

== Political career ==
Joining the colonial era politics in Ceylon with the establishment of the Ceylon National Congress, in which Gunewardene served as Joint Secretary from 1926 to 1932 jointly with S. W. R. D. Bandaranaike and thereafter served as Vice President. During this time he campaigned for universal suffrage. In 1931, he intended to contest the first State Council election from Dhadagamuwa, but dropped out after contracting malaria. He then contested the Gampola seat just two weeks prior to and lost to T. B. Panabokke. In 1936 he was elected to the State Council of Ceylon from Gampola and was a member of the Executive Committee of Local Administration, which was chaired by S. W. R. D. Bandaranaike, who was the Minister of Local Administration. In November 1936, he served as acting Minister of Local Administration. He was elected to the first parliament in the 1947 general election from Gampola. Gunewardene was appointed by D. S. Senanayake as Minister without Portfolio in his cabinet and chief government whip in parliament. However, he was unseated in parliament in May 1948 in an election petition and was succeeded by A. E. Gunasinha as Minister and government whip. He contested the by-election that followed in Gampola and lost to R. S. Pelpola from the United National Party.

== Diplomatic career ==
In 1949, he was appointed as Ceylon's Ambassador to Italy where he served until 1954. He was then appointed Ceylon's Ambassador to the United States, serving from March 1954 to August 1961. When Ceylon became a member of the United Nations in 1955, Gunewardene was appointed concurrently as the first Permanent Representative to United Nations, serving until 1958. In October 1961, he was appointed Ceylon's High Commissioner to United Kingdom serving till June 1963, when he was reappointed as Permanent Representative to United Nations, serving until 1965. During his time in Washington DC, he established the Buddhist Centre in Washington.

== Honors ==
For his service to the government of Ceylon, he was knighted in the 1956 New Year Honours, the last to receive British honors before S. W. R. D. Bandaranaike suspend honors in 1956. In 1963, he was awarded a Doctor of Laws (honoris causa) from the University of Ceylon.

== Family ==
He married his wife Sumana Pemi Gunewardene, a close relative on 10 June 1927, they had three children.

== See also ==
- Sri Lankan Non Career Diplomats
