= M. H. M. Naina Marikar =

Sri Lankan lawyer and politician

Al-Haj Mohamed Haniffa Mohamed Naina Marikkar (born 9 May 1917) was a Sri Lankan lawyer and politician. He served as the Minister of Finance (1988–1989) and Deputy Minister of Finance (1978–1988) in the Jayewardene cabinet.

He qualified as an Advocate, he worked as a Crown Counsel in the Attorney-General's Department. He was first elected to the Parliament of Sri Lanka as member for Puttalam, representing the United National Party in the March 1960 parliamentary election, he was re-elected in the July 1960 parliamentary election, 1965 parliamentary election and was appointed Parliamentary Secretary to the Minister of Justice. He lost his seat in the 1970 parliamentary election and was re-elected in the 1977 parliamentary election.
