= L. B. Dassanayake =

Ceylonese politician

Dassanayake Mudiyanselage Loku Banda Dassanayake (kwon as L. B. Dassanayake) (born 14 April 1920) was a Ceylonese politician. He was the Parliamentary Secretary to the Minister of Communications and member of Parliament of Sri Lanka from Gampola representing the United National Party from 1960 to 1970. He unsuccessfully contested the 1965 Ceylonese parliamentary election and the 1970 Ceylonese parliamentary election
