= Gampola Electoral District =

Electoral district of Sri Lanka

Gampola electoral district was an electoral district of Sri Lanka between August 1947 and February 1989. The district was named after the town of Gampola in Kandy District, Central Province. The 1978 Constitution of Sri Lanka introduced the proportional representation electoral system for electing members of Parliament. The existing 160 mainly single-member electoral districts were replaced with 22 multi-member electoral districts. Gampola electoral district was replaced by the Kandy multi-member electoral district at the 1989 general elections, the first under the proportional representation system.

== Members of Parliament ==
Key

Independent SLFP UNP

Election	Member	Party	Term
1947	R. S. S. Gunawardena	United National Party	1947 - 1948
1948 by-election	R. S. Pelpola	United National Party	1948 -1952
1952	M. W. R. de Silva	United National Party	1952 - 1956
1956	R. S. Pelpola	Sri Lanka Freedom Party	1956 - 1960
1960 (March)	R. R. D. Bandaranayake	Sri Lanka Freedom Party	1960
1960 (July)	L. B. Dassanayake	United National Party	1960 -1970
1965	L. B. Dassanayake	United National Party	1960 -1970
1970	D. M. Jayaratne	Sri Lanka Freedom Party	1970 - 1977
1977	W. M. P. B. Dissanayake	United National Party	1977 -1989

== Elections ==
=== 1947 Parliamentary General Election ===
Results of the 1st parliamentary election held between 23 August 1947 and 20 September 1947:

Candidate	Party	Symbol	Votes	%
R. S. S. Gunawardena	United National Party	Hand	10,434	49.67
R. S. Pelpola		Umbrella	10,047	47.83
Valid Votes			20,481	97.49
Rejected Votes			527	2.51
Total Polled			21,008	100.00
Registered Electors			32,734	
Turnout				64.18

=== 1948 By-Election ===
Following the first parliamentary election, R. S. Pelpola lodged an election petition with the courts, citing allegations of general intimidation and undue influence by the United National Party candidate, R. S. S. Gunawardena. In February 1948 the courts upheld the petition and ordered a new election for the seat be held. Results of the 1948 by-election held on 27 April 1948:

Candidate	Party	Symbol	Votes	%
R. S. Pelpola		House	7,912	40.49
R. S. S. Gunawardena		Elephant	7,137	36.53
A. Jayasinghe		Key	2,592	13.27
Ellis Gunasekera		Flower	1,089	5.57
E. S. Rathnaweera		Eye	396	2.03
Valid Votes			19,072	97.61
Rejected Votes			467	2.39
Total Polled			19,539	100.00
Registered Electors			32,734	
Turnout				59.69

=== 1952 Parliamentary General Election ===
Results of the 2nd parliamentary election held between 24 May 1952 and 30 May 1952:

Candidate	Party	Symbol	Votes	%
M. W. R. de Silva	United National Party	House	7,950	42.74
P. M. Jayasena	Sri Lanka Freedom Party	Star	5,313	28.57
R. S. Pelpola	Independent	Key	2,352	12.65
P. B. Goonatilake	Lanka Sama Samaja Party	Hand	1,926	10.36
C. B. Dharmasena	Republican	Elephant	687	3.69
D. G. Jayasinghe		Umbrella	190	1.02
Valid Votes			18,418	99.03
Rejected Votes			181	0.97
Total Polled			18,599	100.00
Registered Electors			25,598	
Turnout				72.66

=== 1956 Parliamentary General Election ===
Results of the 3rd parliamentary election held between 5 April 1956 and 10 April 1956:

Candidate	Party	Symbol	Votes	%
R. S. Pelpola	Sri Lanka Freedom Party	Hand	13,143	70.34
M. W. R. de Silva	United National Party	Elephant	4,302	23.02
R. D. A. de Lanerolle		Umbrella	859	4.60
Illangan Pelige Rajapakse		Cartwheel	208	1.11
Valid Votes			18,512	99.07
Rejected Votes			173	0.93
Total Polled			18,685	100.00
Registered Electors			29,764	
Turnout				62.78

=== 1960 (March) Parliamentary General Election ===
Results of the 4th parliamentary election held on 19 March 1960:

Candidate	Party	Symbol	Votes	%
R. R. D. Bandaranayake	Sri Lanka Freedom Party	Hand	5,911	35.25
H. W. Kirinda	United National Party	Elephant	4,478	26.70
L. B. Dassanayake		Cartwheel	3,665	21.86
T. V. M. Noon		Rooster	1,328	7.92
R. Weerasinghe Amaradasa		Key	805	4.80
J. M. D. G. Jayasinghe		Umbrella	171	1.02
Nayagam Sivagnanam		Flower	133	0.79
M. T. B. Ratnayake		Eye	80	0.48
Valid Votes			16,571	98.82
Rejected Votes			198	1.18
Total Polled			16,769	100.00
Registered Electors			21,977	
Turnout				76.30

=== 1960 (July) Parliamentary General Election ===
Results of the 5th parliamentary election held on 20 July 1960:

Candidate	Party	Symbol	Votes	%
L. B. Dassanayake	United National Party	Elephant	8,784	50.70
R. R. D. Bandaranayake	Sri Lanka Freedom Party	Hand	8,225	47.48
H. W. Kirinda		Eye	172	0.99
Valid Votes			17,211	99.34
Rejected Votes			114	0.66
Total Polled			17,325	100.00
Registered Electors			21,977	
Turnout				78.83

=== 1965 Parliamentary General Election ===
Results of the 6th parliamentary election held on 22 March 1965:

Candidate	Party	Symbol	Votes	%
L. B. Dassanayake	United National Party	Elephant	13,202	56.56
R. R. D. Bandaranayake	Sri Lanka Freedom Party	Hand	9,573	41.02
N. K. Punchirala		Scales	283	1.21
Cyril S. Ketakumbura		Sun	73	0.31
Valid Votes			23,131	99.11
Rejected Votes			209	0.89
Total Polled			23,340	100.00
Registered Electors			27,320	
Turnout				85.43

=== 1970 Parliamentary General Election ===
Results of the 7th parliamentary election held on 27 May 1970:

Candidate	Party	Symbol	Votes	%
D. M. Jayaratne	Sri Lanka Freedom Party	Hand	14,463	51.73
W. M. P. B. Dissanayake	United National Party	Elephant	13,217	47.27
Anuladasa Wanigasekera		Flowers	150	0.54
Valid Votes			27,830	99.54
Rejected Votes			130	0.46
Total Polled			27,960	100.00
Registered Electors			32,504	
Turnout				86.02

=== 1977 Parliamentary General Election ===
Results of the 7th parliamentary election held on 21 July 1977:

Candidate	Party	Symbol	Votes	%
W. M. P. B. Dissanayake	United National Party	Elephant	21,269	58.05
D. M. Jayaratne	Sri Lanka Freedom Party	Hand	15,048	41.07
Aanula Wanigasekera		Umbrella	119	0.33
Seinual Abdeen		Eye	45	0.12
Sinnathamby Shanmugam		Ladder	39	0.11
Valid Votes			36,520	99.67
Rejected Votes			122	0.33
Total Polled			36,642	100.00
Registered Electors			41,442	
Turnout				88.42
