= Ajith Rajapakse =

Sri Lankan politician

Hon. Ajith Rajapakse
- අජිත් රාජපක්ෂ அஜித் ராஜபக்ஷ

Deputy Speaker of the Parliament of Sri Lanka
- In office 17 May 2022 – 24 September 2024
- Preceded by: Ranjith Siyambalapitiya
- Succeeded by: Rizvie Salih

Member of the Parliament of Sri Lanka
- In office 20 August 2020 – 2024
- Constituency: Hambantota District

Member of the Southern Provincial Council
- In office 1999–2019
- Constituency: Hambantota District

Personal details
- Born: Ajith Nishantha Rajapaksa; 6 January 1974 (age 52)
- Party: Sri Lanka Podujana Peramuna
- Other political affiliations: Sri Lanka People's Freedom Alliance

Ajith Nishantha Rajapakse (born 6 January 1974) is a Sri Lankan politician, former provincial councilor, former Member of Parliament and Deputy Speaker of the Parliament of Sri Lanka from 2022 to 2024. He was a member of Ambalantota Divisional Council and the Southern Provincial Council.

Rajapakse has GCE O/L, A/L qualifications with a Diploma in Politics from National Youth Council. He contested in the 2001 parliamentary election as a candidate of the People's Alliance for the Hambantota District, but failed to get elected. He contested again in the 2015 parliamentary election as a candidate of the United People's Freedom Alliance (UPFA) in the Hambantota District but failed to get elected once again after coming in 5th place amongst the UPFA candidates. He contested in the 2020 parliamentary election as a candidate for the Sri Lanka People's Freedom Alliance in the Hambantota District and was elected to the Parliament of Sri Lanka.

Electoral history of Ajith Rajapakse
Election	Constituency	Party	Alliance	Votes	Result
1999 provincial	Hambantota District		People's Alliance	12,535	Elected
2001 parliamentary	Hambantota District		People's Alliance		Not elected
2004 provincial	Hambantota District		United People's Freedom Alliance	36,546	Elected
2009 provincial	Hambantota District		United People's Freedom Alliance	47,854	Elected
2014 provincial	Hambantota District		United People's Freedom Alliance	34,591	Elected
2015 parliamentary	Hambantota District		United People's Freedom Alliance	41,074	Not elected
2020 parliamentary	Hambantota District	Sri Lanka Podujana Peramuna	Sri Lanka People's Freedom Alliance	47,375	Elected
2024 parliamentary	Hambantota District		New Democratic Front		Not elected
