= Speaker of the Parliament of Sri Lanka =

Presiding officer of the Parliament of Sri Lanka

- ශ්‍රී ලංකා පාර්ලි‌මේන්තු කථානායක இலங்கை நாடாளுமன்ற சபாநாயகர்
- Emblem of Sri Lanka

- Flag of Sri Lanka
- Incumbent; Jagath Wickremerathna since 17 December 2024
- Style: Honourable Speaker
- Residence: The Speaker's Residence, Sri Jayawardenapura Kotte
- Appointer: Parliament of Sri Lanka
- Constituting instrument: Constitution of the Democratic Socialist Republic of Sri Lanka
- Inaugural holder: Alexander Francis Molamure
- Formation: 7 July 1931; 95 years ago (as Speaker of the State Council of Ceylon)
- Succession: Second
- Deputy: Deputy Speaker and Chairman of Committees
- Salary: රු.822,000 annually (2016)
- Website: www.parliament.lk

The Speaker of the Parliament of the Democratic Socialist Republic of Sri Lanka is the presiding officer of the chamber. The Speaker fulfills a number of important functions in relation to the operation of the House, which is based upon the British Westminster parliamentary system. The speaker is second in the Sri Lankan presidential line of succession, after the prime minister.

== Origins ==
In 1931, under the Donoughmore Constitution, the State Council of Ceylon was established and in it the first office of a Speaker of a legislative body was created as the Speaker of the State Council.

In 1947, according to the recommendations of the Soulbury Commission the State Council was dissolved and a Parliament was established in the Westminster model with an upper house, the Senate and the House of Representatives. While the head of the President of the Senate became the head of the Senate, the Speaker of the House of Representatives became the presiding officer of the House of Representatives. The office of the Speaker, as it exists now, was established in 1947, with the opening of the First Parliament of Ceylon on 4 February 1948, granting of independence and the establishment of the Dominion of Ceylon.

== Duties and powers ==
The Speaker presides over the House's debates, determining which members may speak. The Speaker is also responsible for maintaining order during debate, and may punish members who break the rules of the House. The Speaker remains strictly non-partisan, and renounces all affiliation with his or her former political party when taking office for the duration of his term. The Speaker does not take part in debate or vote (except to break ties). Apart from duties relating to presiding over the House, the Speaker also performs administrative and procedural functions, and remains a constituency Member of Parliament (MP). The Speaker would be a chairmen of the constitutional council. The Speaker may accept the resignation of the president. The chief justice in consultation with the Speaker may determine that the president is temporarily unable to exercise, perform and discharge the powers, duties and functions and appoint the prime minister as acting president.

== Appointment ==
As per the Article 64 of the Constitution when Parliament first meets after a general election, it will elect three members to serve as the Speaker, Deputy Speaker and Chairman of Committees (known simply as the Deputy Speaker) and the Deputy Chairman of Committees. The Speaker would vacate his office only if he tenders his resignation to the President or ceases to be a Member of Parliament or when Parliament dissolved.

== Deputies ==
The Speaker is assisted by two deputies, all of whom are elected by the House. These are Deputy Speaker and the Deputy Chairman of Committees. In the absence of the Speaker, the Deputy Speaker or in their absence the Deputy Chairman of Committees, shall preside at sittings of Parliament. If none of them is present, a Member elected by Parliament for the sitting shall preside at the sitting of Parliament.

== Precedence, salary, residence and privileges ==
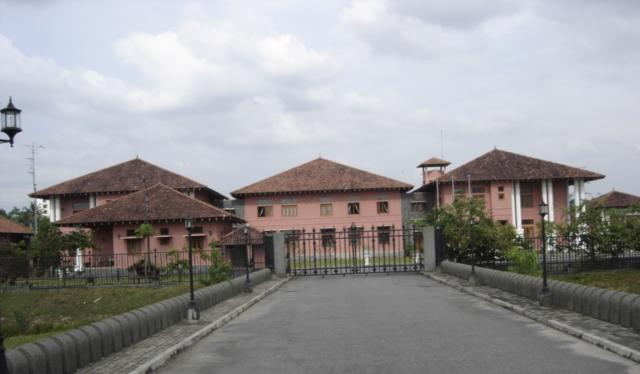
The Speaker's official residence in Kotte

The Speaker is the third highest-ranking official in Sri Lanka. At present, Speaker ranks in the order of precedence after the President and Prime Minister. From 1948 to 1971 (when the Senate was abolished) the Speaker ranked fifth in the precedence after the Governor-General, the Prime Minister, the Chief Justice and the President of the Senate. From 1971 to 1978, the Speaker ranked fourth in the precedence after the Governor-General/President, the Prime Minister and the Chief Justice. After the second amendment to the Republican Constitution in 1978, in which the Speaker was placed second in the presidential line of succession; the Speaker gained his current position in the order of precedence.

In 2016, the Speaker received a salary of 68,500 Sri Lankan rupees per month and other entitlements of a Member of Parliament. In addition, the Speaker can use the Speaker's Residence and entitled to transport and security arranged by the Parliamentary Secretariat. At each sitting of parliament, the Speaker (or the presiding officer) travels in to the chamber in procession, after the Sergeant-at-Arms carrying the ceremonial mace that symbolises the authority of the Parliament. Sergeant-at-Arms attends the Speaker on other occasions. The Speaker has his office in the Parliament Complex and the Secretary-General of Parliament, who is in charge of the administrative duties of Parliament reports to the Speaker.

== Official dress ==
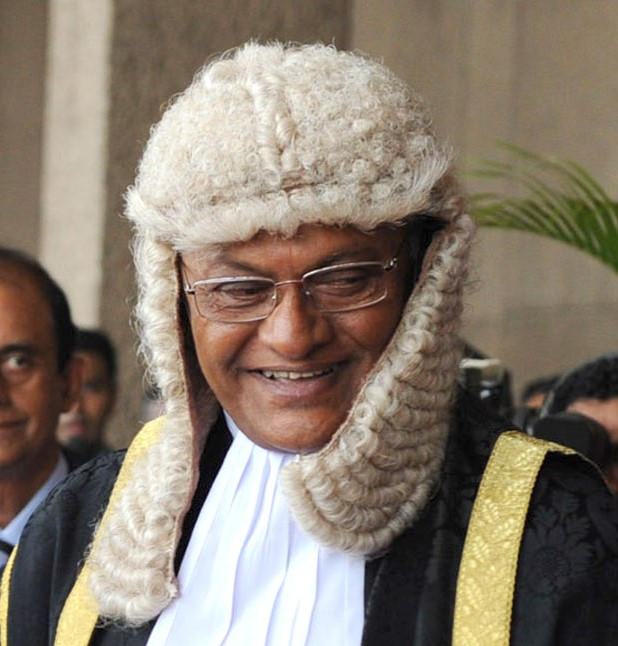
Chamal Rajapaksa, in the Speaker's ceremonial robes, mourning rosette and full bottomed wig

On ceremonial sittings or occasions, the Speaker wears a robe of black satin damask trimmed with gold lace, a mourning rosette (also known as a 'wig bag') and frogs with full bottomed wig. On normal sitting days, the Speaker wears only the robe and rosette without the wig or in certain cases without the official dress. This practice was adopted from the official dress of the Speaker of the House of Commons.

== List of speakers of Parliament ==
Parties

Governors of British Ceylon Independent United National Party Sri Lanka Freedom Party Sri Lanka Podujana Peramuna National People's Power

List of Speakers of Parliament
| No. | Name | Portrait | Party | Tenure | Head(s) of Government | Parliament |
|---|---|---|---|---|---|---|
Speakers of the State Council of Ceylon (1931–1947)
| 1 | Alexander Francis Molamure | | Non-partisan | 7 July 1931 – 10 December 1934 (3 years, 156 days) | Graeme Thomson; Francis Graeme Tyrrell (Act.); Edward Stubbs | 1st State Council |
| 2 | Forester Augustus Obeyesekere | | Non-partisan | 11 December 1934 – 7 December 1935 (361 days) | Edward Stubbs | 1st State Council |
| 3 | Waithilingam Duraiswamy | Waithilingam Duraiswamy | Non-partisan | 17 March 1936 – 4 July 1947 (11 years, 109 days) | Edward Stubbs; Maxwell MacLagan Wedderburn (Act.); Andrew Caldecott; Henry Monck-Mason Moore | 2nd State Council |
Speakers of the Parliament of Ceylon (1947–1972)
| (1) | Alexander Francis Molamure | | United National Party | 14 October 1947 – 25 January 1951 (3 years, 103 days) | Henry Monck-Mason Moore; D. S. Senanayake | 1st |
| 4 | Albert Peries | | United National Party | 13 February 1951 – 18 February 1956 (5 years, 5 days) | D. S. Senanayake; Dudley Senanayake; John Kotelawala | 2nd |
| 5 | Hameed Hussain Sheikh Ismail | | Independent | 19 April 1956 – 5 December 1959 (3 years, 230 days) | S. W. R. D. Bandaranaike; Wijeyananda Dahanayake | 3rd |
| 6 | Tikiri Banda Subasinghe | | Sri Lanka Freedom Party | 30 March – 23 April 1960 (24 days) | Dudley Senanayake | 4th |
| 7 | R. S. Pelpola | | Sri Lanka Freedom Party | 5 August 1960 – 24 January 1964 (3 years, 172 days) | Sirimavo Bandaranaike | 5th |
| 8 | Hugh Fernando | | Sri Lanka Freedom Party | 24 January – 17 December 1964 (328 days) | Sirimavo Bandaranaike | 5th |
| (4) | Albert Peries | | United National Party | 5 April 1965 – 21 September 1967 (2 years, 169 days) | Dudley Senanayake | 6th |
| 9 | Shirley Corea | | United National Party | 27 September 1967 – 25 March 1970 (2 years, 179 days) | Dudley Senanayake | 6th |
| 10 | Stanley Tillekeratne | | Sri Lanka Freedom Party | 7 June 1970 – 22 May 1972 (1 year, 350 days) | Sirimavo Bandaranaike | 7th |
Speakers of the National State Assembly (1972–1978)
| (10) | Stanley Tillekeratne | | Sri Lanka Freedom Party | 22 May 1972 – 18 May 1977 (4 years, 361 days) | Sirimavo Bandaranaike | 1st |
| 11 | Anandatissa de Alwis | | United National Party | 4 August 1977 – 7 September 1978 (1 year, 34 days) | J. R. Jayewardene | 2nd |
Speakers of the Parliament of Sri Lanka (1978–present)
| (11) | Anandatissa de Alwis | | United National Party | 7–13 September 1978 (6 days) | J. R. Jayewardene | 8th |
| 12 | M. A. Bakeer Markar | | United National Party | 21 September 1978 – 30 August 1983 (4 years, 343 days) | J. R. Jayewardene | 8th |
| 13 | E. L. Senanayake | E. L. Senanayake | United National Party | 6 September 1983 – 20 December 1988 (5 years, 105 days) | J. R. Jayewardene | 8th |
| 14 | M. H. Mohamed | | United National Party | 9 March 1989 – 24 June 1994 (5 years, 107 days) | Ranasinghe Premadasa; Dingiri Banda Wijetunga | 9th |
| 15 | K. B. Ratnayake | | Sri Lanka Freedom Party | 25 August 1994 – 10 October 2000 (6 years, 46 days) | Dingiri Banda Wijetunga | 10th |
| 15 | K. B. Ratnayake | | Sri Lanka Freedom Party | 25 August 1994 – 10 October 2000 (6 years, 46 days) | Chandrika Kumaratunga | 10th |
| 16 | Anura Bandaranaike | Anura Bandaranaike | United National Party | 18 October 2000 – 10 October 2001 (357 days) | Chandrika Kumaratunga | 11th |
| 17 | Joseph Michael Perera | Joseph Michael Perera | United National Party | 19 December 2001 – 7 February 2004 (2 years, 50 days) | Chandrika Kumaratunga | 12th |
| 18 | W. J. M. Lokubandara | W. J. M. Lokubandara | United National Party | 22 April 2004 – 8 April 2010 (5 years, 351 days) | Chandrika Kumaratunga; Mahinda Rajapaksa | 13th |
| 19 | Chamal Rajapaksa | Chamal Rajapaksa | Sri Lanka Freedom Party | 22 April 2010 – 26 June 2015 (5 years, 65 days) | [[Mahinda Rajap aksa]] Maithripala Sirisena | 14th |
| 20 | Sri Lankabhimanya Karu Jayasuriya | Karu Jayasuriya | United National Party | 1 September 2015 – 2 March 2020 (4 years, 183 days) | Maithripala Sirisena | 15th |
| 20 | Sri Lankabhimanya Karu Jayasuriya | Karu Jayasuriya | United National Party | 1 September 2015 – 2 March 2020 (4 years, 183 days) | Gotabaya Rajapaksa | 15th |
| 21 | Mahinda Yapa Abeywardena | Mahinda Yapa Abeywardena | Sri Lanka Podujana Peramuna | 20 August 2020 – 24 September 2024 (4 years, 35 days) | Gotabaya Rajapaksa | 16th |
| 21 | Mahinda Yapa Abeywardena | Mahinda Yapa Abeywardena | Sri Lanka Podujana Peramuna | 20 August 2020 – 24 September 2024 (4 years, 35 days) | Ranil Wickremesinghe | 16th |
| 21 | Mahinda Yapa Abeywardena | Mahinda Yapa Abeywardena | Sri Lanka Podujana Peramuna | 20 August 2020 – 24 September 2024 (4 years, 35 days) | Anura Kumara Dissanayake | 16th |
| 22 | Asoka Ranwala | | National People's Power | 21 November – 13 December 2024 (22 days) | Anura Kumara Dissanayake | 17th |
| 23 | Jagath Wickramaratne | | National People's Power | 17 December 2024 – present (1 year, 291 days) | Anura Kumara Dissanayake | 17th |

== No-confidence motions ==
- Mahinda Yapa Abeywardena – On 5 March 2024, the main opposition Samagi Jana Balawegaya handed over a no-confidence motion against Speaker Abeywardena, claiming his failure to protect the Constitution of Sri Lanka by signing the Online Safety Act.

== See also ==
- Parliament of Sri Lanka
