= Rizvie Salih =

Deputy Speaker of the Parliament of Sri Lanka since 2024

Hon. Rizvie Salih MP
- රිස්වි සාලි ரிஸ்வி சாலி

Deputy Speaker of the Parliament Chairman of Committees
- Incumbent
- Assumed office 21 November 2024
- President: Anura Kumara Dissanayake
- Prime Minister: Harini Amarasuriya
- Speaker: Asoka Ranwala; Jagath Wickramaratne
- Preceded by: Ajith Rajapaksa

Member of Parliament for Colombo District
- Incumbent
- Assumed office 21 November 2024
- Majority: 73,018 Preferential votes

Personal details
- Party: National People's Power
- Education: Chulalongkorn University
- Profession: Physician

Rizvie Salih is a Sri Lankan physician and politician, who has served as the Deputy Speaker of the Parliament of Sri Lanka since November 2024. He was elected to the Sri Lankan Parliament from Colombo Electoral District as a member of the National People's Power.
