= Shirley Corea =

Sri Lankan politician

The Honourable Shirley Corea MP

9th Speaker of the Parliament
- In office 27 September 1967 – 25 March 1970
- Prime Minister: Dudley Senanayake
- Preceded by: Albert F Peries
- Succeeded by: Stanley Tillekeratne

Member of the Ceylon Parliament for Chilaw
- In office 1952–1956
- Preceded by: J. J. Fernando
- Succeeded by: W. J. C. Munasinghe
- In office 1965–1970
- Preceded by: S. D. R. Jayaratne
- Succeeded by: S. D. R. Jayaratne

Personal details
- Born: Srikumaradas Charles Shirley Corea; 7 March 1906 Chilaw, Sri Lanka
- Died: 5 March 1974 (aged 67) Colombo, Sri Lanka
- Party: United National Party
- Occupation: Politician

Srikumaradas Charles Shirley Corea (7 March 1906 – 5 March 1974) was a Sri Lankan politician. He was the 9th Speaker of the Parliament and a Member of Parliament, representing Chilaw. He was a member of the United National Party of Sri Lanka.

== Early life ==
Shirley Corea was born in Chilaw. His father was Charles Edgar Corea who was elected President of the Ceylon National Congress in 1924. He was the nephew Victor Corea who was a founder member of the Ceylon National Congress. Shirley Corea grew up in this political world. His father and uncle founded the Chilaw Association and campaigned for independence from the British Raj. When Mahatma Gandhi, the 'Father of India' visited Ceylon in 1927, he travelled to Chilaw and was the Chief Guest at a banquet in a Corea home called 'Sigiriya.' Shirley Corea met Mahatma Gandhi in 1927.

== Education and legal career ==
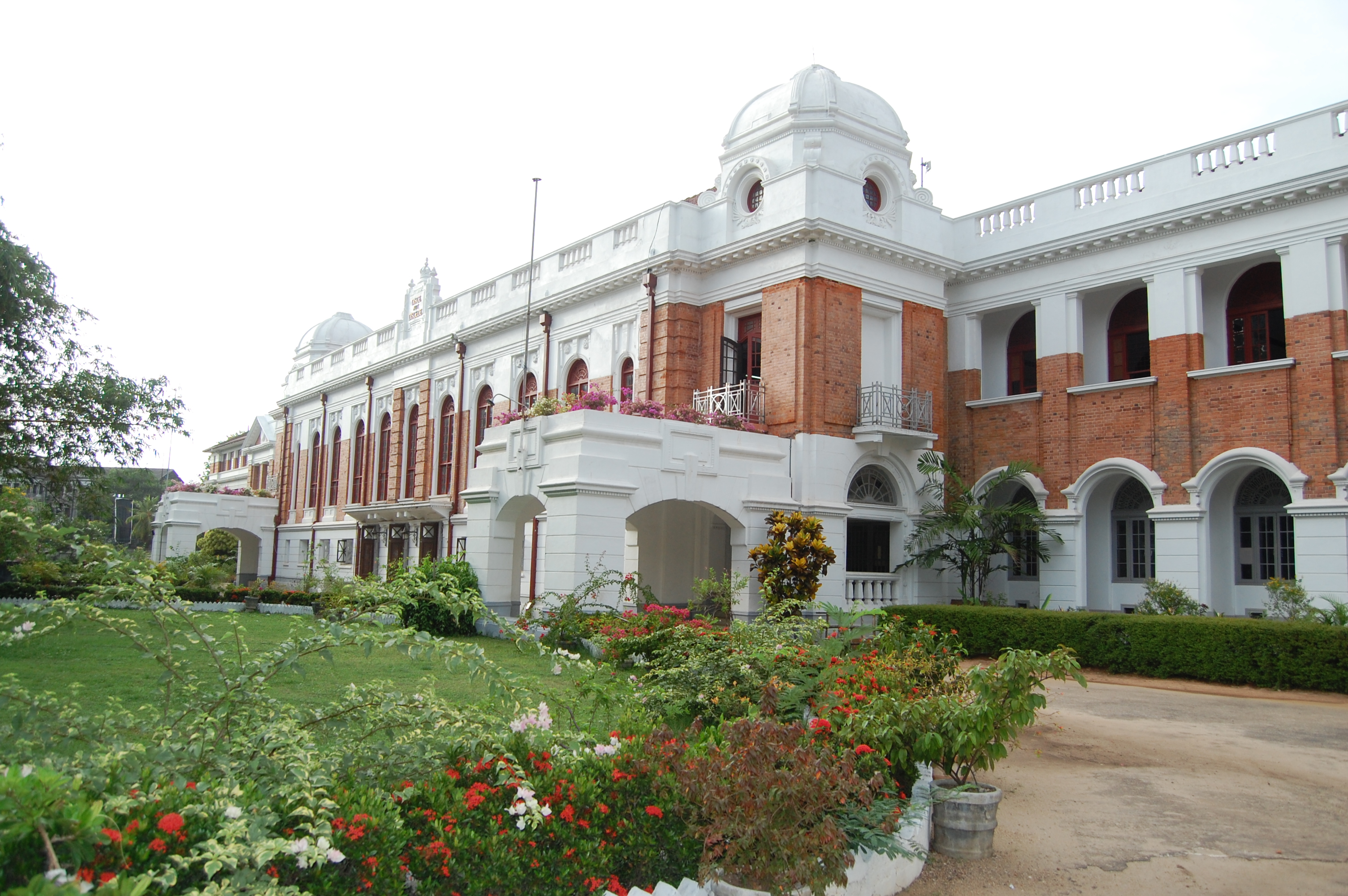
The young Shirley Corea was educated at Royal College, Colombo.

Shirley Corea was educated at Royal College Colombo where he excelled in school debates and he served as Secretary of the Royal College Social Service League - he was a founder member. He entered Ceylon Law College and passed out as a Proctor of the Supreme Court of Ceylon in 1932. He practiced in Chilaw and extended his much sought legal carrier in Kuliyapitiya, Puttalam, Anuradhapura, Mannar, Vavuniya and Maho; once he was retained in a case to defend the late Mr. Eddie Jayamanne husband of the famous Sri Lankan actress, Rukmani Devi and personalities from the world of Sri Lankan cinema in a Madras Court, in India. Corea was a well known trial lawyer on the island of Sri Lanka.

== Political career ==
Corea entered mainstream politics when he contested the seat of Chilaw in the 1952 parliamentary election from the United National Party, which he won by a slim majority of 54 votes against W. J. C. Munasinha. He was appointed Parliamentary Secretary to the Minister of Trade and Fisheries, R. G. Senanayake. When Senanayake resigned in July 1954 Corea was appointed the Minister of Trade Commerce and Fisheries by Prime Minister of Ceylon, Sir John Kotelawala and served till 1956. He lost his seat in the 1956 parliamentary election to W. J. C. Munasinha and did not contest the general elections that followed. He contested the 19565 parliamentary election and won against both S. D. R. Jayaratne and W. J. C. Munasinha. He was elected Deputy speaker and chairman of committees in parliament in April 1965 and served till September 1967, when he succeeded Sir Albert Peries as the Speaker following his death. He lost is seat to S. D. R. Jayaratne in the 1970 parliamentary election. He was highly respected for being fair when it came to parliamentary debates in the chamber. During his tenure as Speaker, Shirley's Corea's official residence was the spacious 'Mumtaz Mahal' in Colombo.

== Chilaw ==
'The Island' newspaper observed: 'Mr. Corea has done many development work in his electorate; he always gave priority to Society and not for the particular individual, in Chilaw electorate Yoda-Ela Scheme in Karawita, Sengal-Oya Scheme; development of Karukupone and Udappuwa fishing villages; Transport Services; Education; Health are the few priorities he had. Chilaw Bauddha Mandiraya would not have been, if not for Mr. Corea’s afforts [sic], there were a lot of obstructions from Judges, lawyers and many others as this building is just adjacent to the District Court of Chilaw, but Mr. Corea was successful and laid the foundation by the late William Gopallawa, Governor General of Ceylon; for this act Dr. A. D. V. Premaratne; Messrs. Sirisena Weerasuriya, Sirisoma and N. M. Gnanalankara gave their utmost support to him to make this venture a success; it is also unforgetable [sic] the services he rendered to the Ananda College of Chilaw. Mr. Corea was also the Patron of Chilaw District Boy Scout Local Association and in many other social service organisations.'

He was the Chairman of Chilaw Puttalam Planters’ Association, Chilaw Negombo Rotary Club and many times, the President of Chilaw Sports Club, Commonwealth Association, a delegate to the World Peace Through the Rule of Law and President of Law Society of Ceylon. Mr. Corea was a very close associate of Asia Foundation representative in Sri Lanka Mr. James H. Nayes and obtained much assistance to his electorate. As a Christian, Mr. Corea served as a Diocesan Council member, of the Church of Ceylon, for a long period.

== See also ==
- Dominicus Corea
- Edirille Bandara
- Charles Edgar Corea
- List of political families in Sri Lanka
- Edirimanne Corea Family Union
- Church of Ceylon
- Mahatma Gandhi's visit to Chilaw, Sri Lanka
- House of Representatives of Ceylon
- Speaker of the Parliament of Sri Lanka

== Bibliography ==
- Handbook of the Parliament of Sri Lanka
- Great Sinhalese Men and Women of History - Edirille Bandara (Domingos Corea) By John M. Senaveratna, (1937)
- 20th century Impressions of Ceylon: Its History, People, Commerce, Industries and Resources By A.W. Wright, Asian Educational Services, India; New Ed edition (15 December 2007)
