= Festus Perera =

Sri Lankan politician

Hon. Festus Perera

Member of Parliament for Wennappuwa
- In office 1965–1970
- In office 1977–1989

Member of Parliament for Puttalam
- In office 1989–2001

Personal details
- Born: Michael Festus Wenceslaus Perera; 29 September 1931
- Died: 12 January 2013 (aged 81)
- Party: United National Party
- Spouse: Larine Perera
- Children: Niroshan Perera

Michael Festus Wenceslaus Perera (1931 - 2013) was a Sri Lankan politician. He was first elected to parliament representing Wennappuwa at the 6th parliamentary election in 1965. He failed to get re-elected at the subsequent 1970 parliamentary election but was successful at the 8th parliamentary election in 1977. At the 9th parliamentary election the Wennappuwa electorate was replaced by the Puttalam multi-member electoral district. Perera was elected as one of the constituency's members from 1989 to 2001.

== Personal life ==
Perera was married to former member of parliament Larine Perera and is the father of former member of parliament Niroshan Perera. Perera died on 12 January 2013 at the age of 81.
