= Holy Family Girls School, Wennappuwa =

Holy Family Girls' School
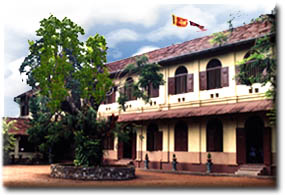
- Holy Family Girls School
- Wennappuwa, North Western Province; Sri Lanka

Information
- Former name: Wennappuwa Girls’ Elementary English School
- Motto: Living in Gratitude with Simplicity and Fidelity
- Established: 1930
- Staff: 90
- Gender: Girls
- Enrollment: 2300
- Website: www.holyfamilywennappuwa.slt.lk

Wennappuwa Holy Family Girls' School is a girls' school in Wennappuwa in the North Western Province in Sri Lanka, which was established in 1930 under the Holy Family sisters of Bordeaux. It was an English Medium school until taken over by the government in 1960.

The school motto is Living in Gratitude with Simplicity and Fidelity.

== History ==
Holy Family girls’ School was established in 1930 as Wennappuwa Girls’ Elementary English School. At the beginning there were classes from standard I-IV, with 60 students. The Kindergarten was started in 1930. Being a private school, the students paid for the education they received, and the teachers were paid by the bishop of the diocese.

The school was taken over by the Sri Lankan government on 23 September 1974.

== Principals ==
- Rev. Sr. Benigna Ekanayake 1930-1954
- Rev. Sr. Malachy Walsh 1955-1966
- Rev. Sr. JohnBerchmans Kerewgodage 1967-1970
- Rev. Sr. Mechtilde Marie Fernando 1971-1974
- Rev. Sr. Olga Tissera 1975-1977
- Rev. Sr. Mary Patronilla Gunesekara 1978-1995
- Rev. Sr. Mary Ethel 1995-1996
- Rev. Sr. Mary Ida 1999-2003
- Rev. Sr. Henrietta Perera 2003-2010
- Rev. Sr. Vijitha Kakulthotuwa 2010-2013
- Rev. Sr. Priyangani Perera 2013-2019

== Present day ==
The school has 2300 students and 90 staff. The principal is the Rev. Sr. Shirani.

There are Science, Commerce, Arts, English and Media associations. The teachers in charge of the Girls’ Guide Unit conduct their meetings both in Sinhala and English language.

== Events ==
=== Science Day ===
Science Day is celebrated in school annually. Members of the Science Union together with teachers of the science section, organize class level competitions within the school. "Do you know" contests, competitions on creations and exhibitions are held every year The winners receive prizes and certificates at the annual Science Day. The annual publication of "Vidumuthu" provides an opportunity for the students of the Science section to publish material.

=== Commerce Day ===
Commerce Day is celebrated annually. The Commerce Section plan the day in co-operation with the Commerce students of the school. The annual publication "Siddantha" is published by the Commerce Section. Competitions for speeches, essays and "Do you know" contests are held for both senior and junior students in accordance with the Commerce Day. The winners are certificated and forwarded for the Zonal Level Competitions.

=== Arts Day ===
The Arts section of the school plan Arts Day. The Arts magazine is "Vikasitha".

=== English Day ===
The English teaching unit of the school celebrates English Day under the patronage of the principal of the school. The specialty of the annual English Day is that almost all the students of the school taking part in competitions class level events.

Competitions like speeches, oratory, dictation, essay writing, recitation, Scrabble, creative writing and copy writing. The winners receive certificates and the selection for the divisional level competition is done at the same time.

=== Children’s Day and Teachers’ Day ===
The celebration of the Children's Day and Teachers’ Day takes place annually. The school prefect union, under the supervision of the Rev. Sr. principal, organizes the days with the co-operation of the teachers in charge of the prefects’ union.

== Academic performances ==
A student came top among all girls in the country in GCE AL 2014 Mathematics stream.
