= Speaker's Residence, Sri Jayawardenapura-Kotte =

Speaker's Residence
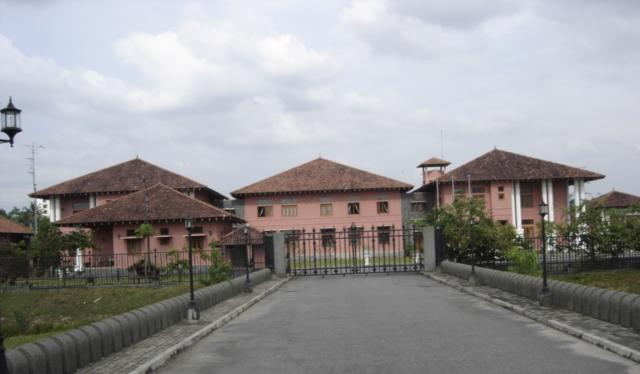
- Speaker's Residence

General information
- Location: Sri Jayawardenapura-Kotte, Sri Lanka
- Owner: Parliament of Sri Lanka

The Speaker's Residence is the official residence of the Speaker of the Parliament of Sri Lanka, located in Sri Jayawardenapura-Kotte, Sri Lanka. The current residence was built in 2000 close to the Parliament Complex.

== History ==
The first official residence of the Speaker of the House of Representatives, Mumtaz Mahal, Colombo was located at Kollupitiya, a suburb of Colombo. However once the Parliament was moved to the new Parliament Complex in Sri Jayawardenapura-Kotte, plans were made to shift the Speaker's Residence to Sri Jayawardenapura-Kotte as well. However this move was delayed by almost twenty years.

== See also ==
- Parliament of Sri Lanka
