= R. R. D. Bandaranayake =

Member of Parliament of Sri Lanka

Ratnasekera Ralahamilage Dias Bandaranayake was a Ceylonese politician. He was the member of Parliament of Sri Lanka from Gampola representing the Sri Lanka Freedom Party in 1960. He unsuccessfully contested the July 1960 Ceylonese parliamentary election and the 1965 Ceylonese parliamentary election
