= Madiwela Housing Complex =

Madiwela Housing Complex in the suburb of Madiwela, Sri Jayawardenepura Kotte is a housing scheme owned and maintained by the Parliament of Sri Lanka for the use of Members of Parliament (MPs) from outside Colombo.

Until the 1980s, MPs from outlying regions of the island lodged at Srawasthi Mandiraya in central Colombo. The Madiwela Housing Complex was built with 120 housing units for Members of Parliament and their families for the duration of their term in office. The Madiwela Housing Complex was completed in 1994. In 2014 the government decided to construct a high-rise residential tower at a 1.0 ha (2.5 acres) site near the Sri Jayewardenepura Teaching Hospital in Thalapathpitiya, at a cost of Rs 6B, to replace the aging housing at Madiwela.

== See also ==
- Parliament of Sri Lanka
