= R. S. Pelpola =

Sri Lankan politician (1898–1971)

Hon. R. S. Pelpola

7th Speaker of the Parliament
- In office 5 August 1960 – 24 January 1964
- Prime Minister: Sirimavo Bandaranaike
- Preceded by: Tikiri Banda Subasinghe
- Succeeded by: Hugh Fernando

Member of the Ceylon Parliament for Gampola
- In office 1948–1952
- Preceded by: Senerat Gunewardene
- Succeeded by: M. W. R. de Silva
- In office 1956–1960
- Preceded by: M. W. R. de Silva
- Succeeded by: R. R. D. Bandaranayake

Member of the Ceylon Parliament for Nawalapitiya
- In office 1960–1965
- Preceded by: Robert Edward Jayatilaka
- Succeeded by: Chandra Karunaratne

Personal details
- Born: Richard Stanley Pelpola; 21 November 1898
- Died: 19 July 1971 (aged 72) Kuala Lumpur, Malaysia
- Party: Sri Lanka Freedom Party
- Occupation: politician, diplomat

Richard Stanley Pelpola (21 November 1898 - 19 July 1971) was the Speaker of the Parliament of Ceylon and a member of Parliament in the cabinet of S. W. R. D. Bandaranaike. He resigned from his position of speaker in 1964 Later in his life he was appointed Sri Lankan High Commissioner to Malaysia. Pelpola died in Kuala Lumpur in 1971. He had fourteen children.

== See also ==
- Sri Lankan Non Career Diplomats
