= Joseph Vaz College =

St. Joseph Vaz College Wennappuwa

Location
- Wennappuwa; Sri Lanka
- Coordinates: 7°20′19″N 79°50′33″E

Information
- Type: Public
- Motto: Latin: Domino Pro Patria
- Established: 1934
- Founder: Peter Mark, Archbishop of the Roman Catholic Church
- Principal: Priyanjeewa Gunarathne
- Staff: 280
- Grades: Class 1 – 13
- Gender: Boys
- Age: 6 to 19
- Enrollment: 7450
- Houses: Anton, Jonas, Lewis, Peters
- Colours: Blue and gold
- Former pupils: Old Vazians
- Website: www.josephvazcollege.lk

The Joseph Vaz College of Wennappuwa is a public school in Wennappuwa, Sri Lanka. It was established in 1934 and consecrated in honour of St. Joseph Vaz. It opened with 28 children with Bro. Lewis as its first director. It is a National School, meaning that it is funded by the central government as opposed to the Provincial Council. It provides both primary and secondary education. It has a student population of 7450 and the tutorial staff consists of 280 teachers.

== History ==
- In 1933 Peter Marque, Archbishop of Colombo requested the Marist Brothers to open a school at Wennappuwa.
- The Superiors agreed to this request and consented to buy the necessary land and to put up the buildings. Funds were sent from the Marist Brother House in France. With the help of Fr. J. Mazeyer O.M.I. (Parish Priest of Wennappuwa) and the generosity of Chevalier John Fernando and Messrs. W.K. Michael Fernando, W.K. Charles Fernando and W.K. Peter Fernando, 4 acres (16,000 m^{2}) of land were bought and the foundation laid in February 1934. By August of the same year the buildings were completed and declared open by the Archbishop. The first community of Brothers consisted of Revd Bro. Lewis (Director) Bro. Honorias and Bro. Felix.
- In 1935 the school was registered by the government and declared eligible for grant. In July Bro. Kenny joined the community. In 1936 three temporary classrooms were put up. The number of boys had reached 132. In 1939 the number on roll was 175 and the school began to prepare students for the London Matriculation and Senior School Certificate Examinations. In 1941 eight candidates sat for the London Matriculation for the first time and two passed. In 1942 out of 8 Matriculation pupils and 4 out of 6 SSC students were successful.
- From 1941 the Junior Seminarists of the Chilaw Diocese, which had been erected as a diocese in 1939, began to attend class at Joseph Vaz. In the same year Bro. Conran was appointed Director of the college. The community consisted of Bro. Conran, Bro. Bernard and Bro. Ethelbert. The number of students on roll was 206. In March 1942 the building of the Science Block was started. Benefactors contributed Rs. 4,000 for the building. The new block was declared open and blessed by His Lordship Mgr. Edmund Peiris O.M.I. Bisho of Chilaw.
- In 1945 the college entered the Free Education Scheme. That year the first Prie Distribution of the college was held, presided over by His Lordship the Bishop of Chilaw. In 1947 a new block was added to house the Brothers Refectory, kitchen, servants quarter and Staff Room.
- In 1949 Bro. Conran was transferred to Marist Stellaand Bro. Anthony succeeded him. In August of the same year Bro. Felix was appointed Director and Bro. Anthony left for Christ King College, Tudella. By now the number on roll was 342. Five out of 20 candidates passed the SSC in 1950.
- On 13 October 1950 the extension of the original building was started. The foundation stone was laid by Mr. W.K. Charles Fernando . The building cost Rs. 50,000 which had been collected by the Brothers from benefactors and well-wishers. It was blessed by very Revd. Fr. Michael Perera on 13 October 1951.
- In 1951 the playground was enlarged by the acquisition of a property adjoining the college. The new property covered one end a half acres and cost Rs. 16,000, met by contributions from benefactors.
- In October 1952 the foundation stone for the Chapel of Our Lady of Fatima was blessed by the Bishop of Kandy, Bernard Regno O.S.E. and laid by Messrs W.B. Tissera and J.J. Pinto. The college became Champions of the Western Group North Meet for the second year in succession. Bro. Jonas was in charge of games at the time. The Carnival and Raffle held in 1952 to raise funds for the chapel collected Rs. 123,875.
- In 1953 another three-quarter acre block was acquired. Work was started on the building to contain six class-rooms, Physics Laboratory, Library, Staff Rooms and Store Room. The foundation stone was blessed by Revd. Fr. P. Felician Fernando – the first Old Boy to be ordained a priest.
- In 1955, Bro. Felix was transferred to Christ King College and Bro/ Peter Berchmans succeeded him as Director.
- In 1956, the new Chapel was blessed by His Lordship the Bishop of Chilaw, Rt. Revd Dr. Edmund Peiris O.M.I.
- In 1959, the 25th anniversary of the foundation of the college was marked by a grand Jubilee Sports Meet. Scouting was introduced to the college in the same year. In September Bro. Peter was transferred to Maris Stella College and he was succeeded by Bro. Stanislaus.
- In December 1960 when schools were taken over by the Government, Joseph Vaz College remained an unaided private school- non-fee Levying. A Welfare Association was formed to help in financing the school.
- On 1 September 1962 the school was taken over by the Minister of Education and declared a Director- Managed School.
- 14 March 1963 saw the formal vesting of the school in Government
- On 13 October 2009 the school celebrated its 75th anniversary (Diamond Jubilee).

== College today ==
The student population is 7450 with 280 teachers. The college has laboratories library, dental clinic, computer unit and a playground with a two-storey pavilion.

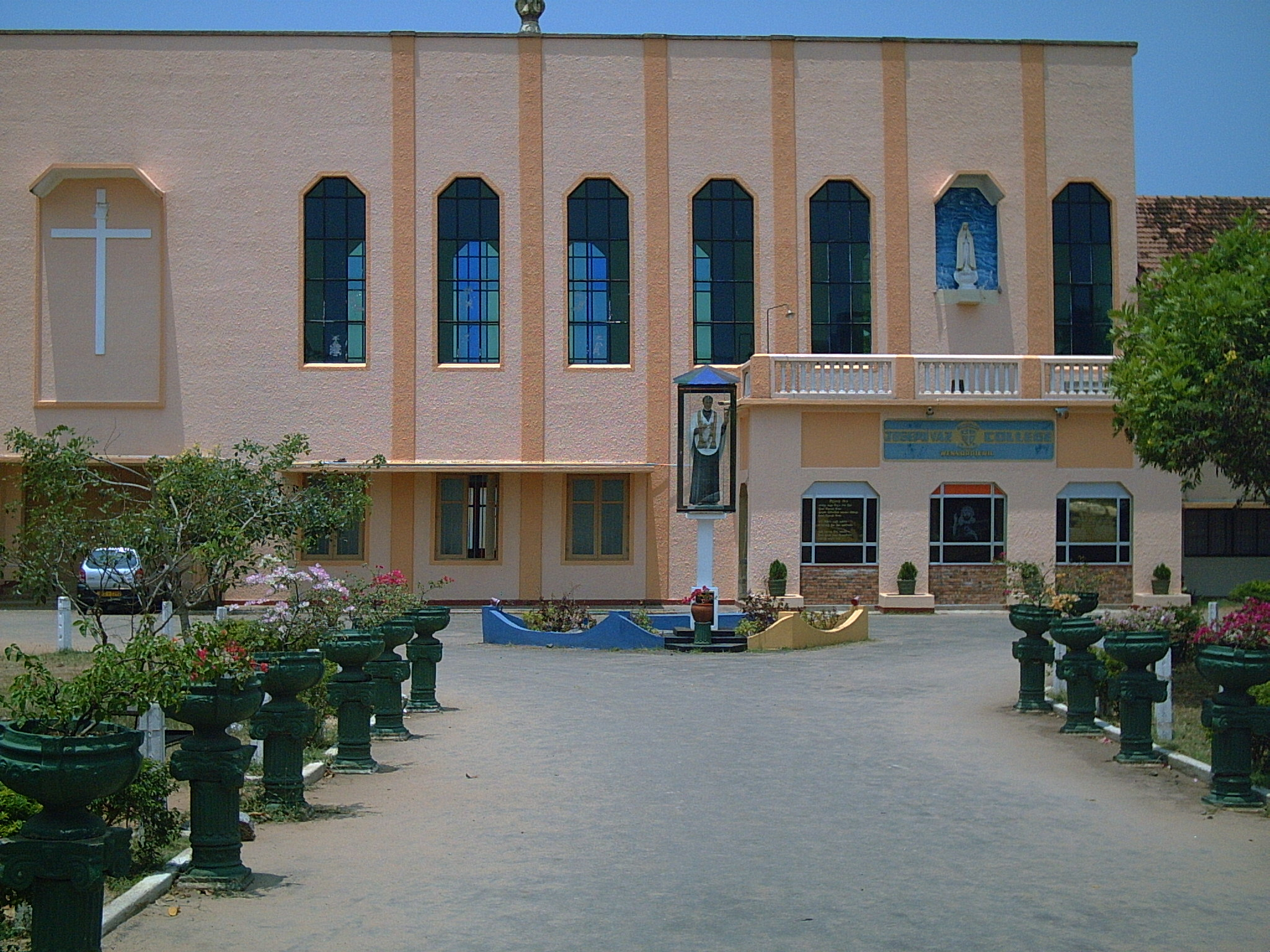
College (2010)

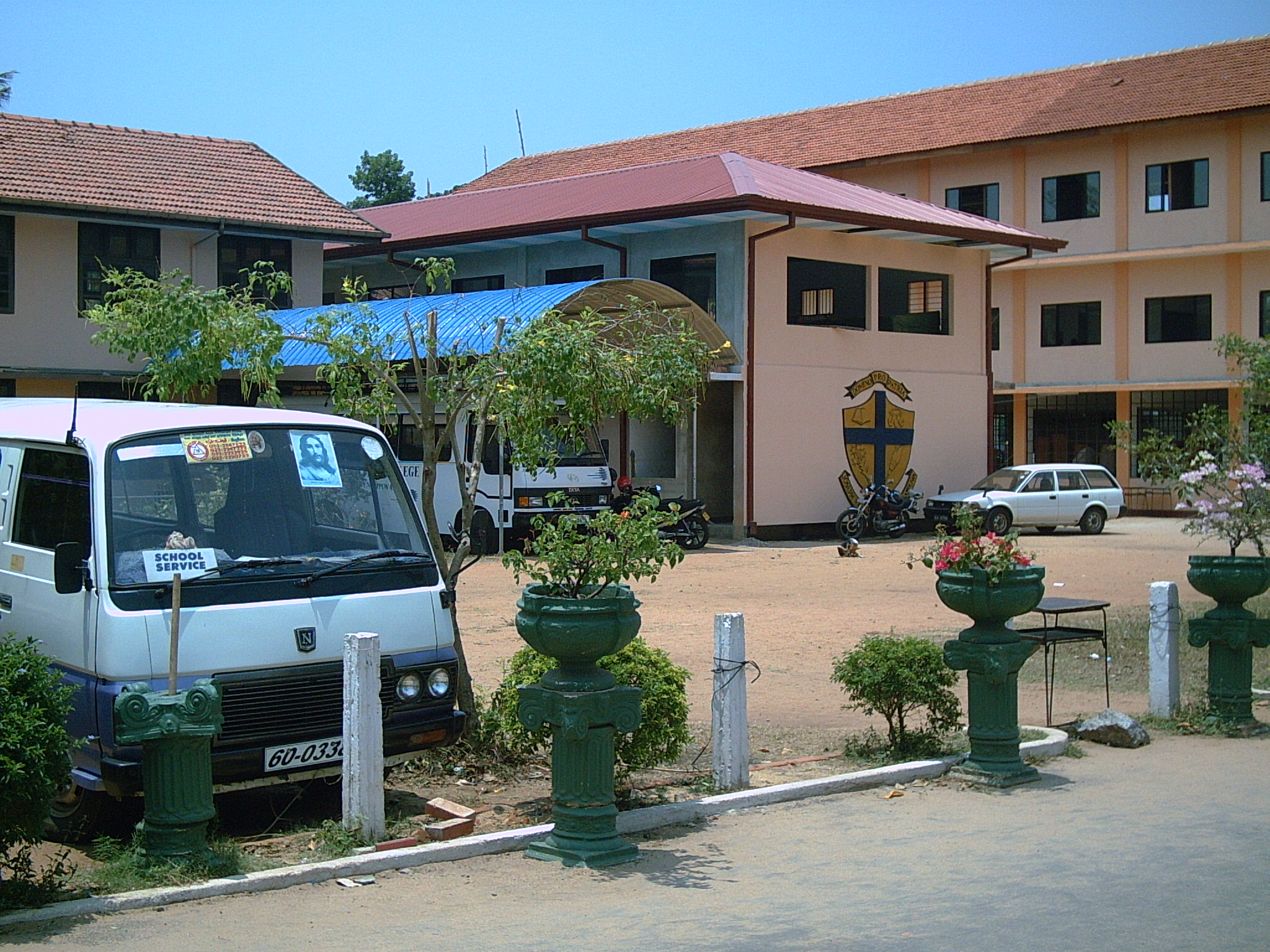
Children's facilities

== Past principals ==
- Rev. Bro. Levis 1934 - 1941
- Rev. Bro. Conran 1941 - 1949
- Rev. Bro. Anthony 1949
- Rev. Bro. Felix 1949 - 1955
- Rev. Bro. Pieter Burkman 1955 - 1959
- Rev. Bro. Staines Laws 1959 - 1970
- Mr. Pantaleon Kurukularachchi 1971 - 1984
- Mr. K. Jerad Elias 1984 - 1986
- Mr. P. P. D. T. Aquinas 1986 - 1988
- Mr. J. A. Arangalla 1988 - 1993
- Rev. Fr. Marius Shelton Fernando 1993 - 1996
- Mr. Lesley Thamel 1997 - 2002
- Rev. Bro. O. P. Noel Fonseka 2002 - 2007
- Rev. Fr. Sylvester Jayakody 2007 - 2010
- Rev. Priyanjeewa Gunarathne 2010–present
