= J. C. W. Munasinha =

Sri Lankan politician

Welikala James Charles Munasinha was a Sri Lankan politician. He served as the Minister of Industries and Fisheries and Member of Parliament from the Chilaw.

== Career ==
He first contested the 1947 general elections from the Chilaw electorate as an independent candidate without success. He again contested the 1952 general elections from the Sri Lanka Freedom Party in Chilaw, again without success. He was successful in the 1956 general elections, beating the incumbent Shirley Corea and was elected to the House of Representatives from Chilaw. S. W. R. D. Bandaranaike appointed Munasinha as Parliamentary Secretary to the Minister of Industries and Fisheries in 1956 and in June 1959 he was promoted to Cabinet Minister of Industries and Fisheries and continued in the cabinet of W. Dahanayake.

He was re-elected in the 1960 March general elections, but was defeated in the 1960 July general elections. He unsuccessfully contested the 1965 general elections.
