= National State Assembly =

Legislature of Sri Lanka

- Sri Lanka

Type
- Type: Unicameral

History
- Established: 22 May 1972
- Disbanded: 7 September 1978
- Preceded by: Parliament of Ceylon
- Succeeded by: Parliament of Sri Lanka
- Seats: 151 (1972-1977); 168 (1977-1978)

Elections
- Last election: 1977 Sri Lankan parliamentary election

Meeting place
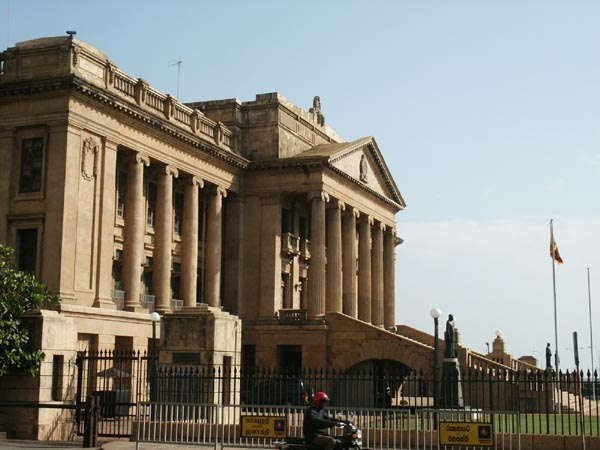
- The State Council building in Galle Face Green, Colombo. The building was used by the State Council's successors (the House of Representatives of Ceylon, National State Assembly, and Parliament of Sri Lanka) until 1982. Today it is known as the Old Parliament Building and houses the Presidential Secretariat.

The National State Assembly (NSA) was the legislative body of Sri Lanka established in May 1972 under the First Republican Constitution. The assembly was introduced by Prime Minister Sirimavo Bandaranaike under the United Front Government replacing the Parliament of Ceylon, a bicameral arrangement set up with the Soulbury Commission.

The major changes were an increase in the authority of the government, described as "a vehicle for the sovereignty of the people". It gave the government the power to act without constitutional restraints, with the courts having no rights to question the validity of the laws passed by the assembly. All laws passed by the NSA were valid until repealed by the assembly itself. The assembly saw the introduction of socialist principles and a constitutional foundation to the pre-eminent position of Sinhala and Buddhism. Both the judiciary and Civil Service came under political control. The assembly was unicameral and initially consisted of the 151 elected members of its predecessor the House of Representatives, as the Senate had been abolished in 1971. The first amendment to the current constitution was to increase the number of members to 168.

The current Constitution of Sri Lanka, adopted on 7 September 1978, replaced the National State Assembly with the Parliament of Sri Lanka.

== List of Parliaments ==
#	Parliament	Began	Session	Session opened	Session adjourned	Ended	Duration
10	1st National State Assembly	22 May 1972	1	22 May 1972	10 February 1977	10 February 1977	4 years 11 months 26 days
11	2nd National State Assembly	4 August 1977	1	4 August 1977	7 September 1978	7 September 1978	1 year 1 month 3 days

== Members ==
=== Speakers ===
- Stanley Tillekeratne (1972–77)
- Anandatissa de Alwis (1977–78)

=== Deputy Speaker and Chairman of Committees ===
- I. A. Cader (1972–77)
- Mohammed Abdul Bakeer Markar (1977–78)

== See also ==
- Parliament of Ceylon
- Parliament of Sri Lanka
