= Srawasthi Mandiraya =

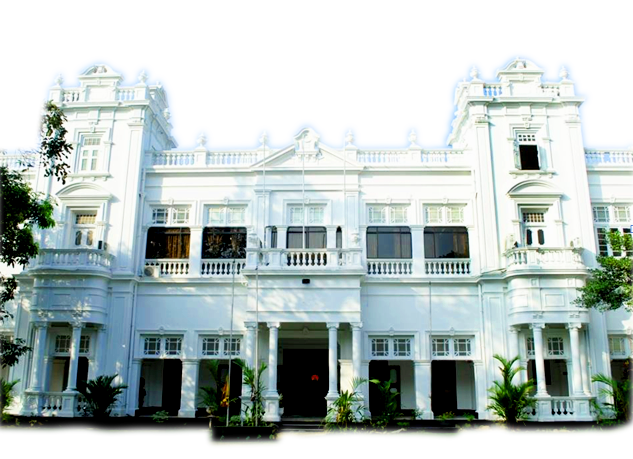
- The facade of Srawasthi Mandiraya
- Interactive map of the Srawasthi Mandiraya area

General information
- Location: Cinnamon Gardens, 32 Sir Marcus Fernando Mawatha, Colombo, Sri Lanka
- Coordinates: 6.909891°N 79.858408°E
- Current tenants: Western Provincial Council
- Completed: 1913
- Owner: Government of Sri Lanka

The Srawasthi Mandiraya is the primary office complex of the Western Provincial Council, located in Cinnamon Gardens, a suburb of Colombo. Built in 1913, it saw use for most of its lifetime as a hostel for Members of Parliament from outside Colombo who were attending Parliamentary sittings. It is located along Sir Marcus Fernando Mawatha (formerly Edinburgh Crescent).

== History ==
The mansion was built in 1913 along the lines of a Tuscan villa by veterinary surgeon and philanthropist W. A. de Silva, member of the Legislative Council of Ceylon and the State Council of Ceylon, and who served as Minister of Health (1936 - 1942). One of the largest houses in Colombo at the time, Dr de Silva hosted many dignitaries such as Jawaharlal Nehru, Rabindranath Tagore and Lord Donoughmore. He later gifted the mansion to the nation.

With Ceylon gaining independence, the house was converted by the Government of Ceylon as a hostel for Member of Parliament who had to travel to Colombo from their constituencies to attend Parliamentary sittings. Following the construction of the Madiwela Housing Complex (consisting of 120 housing units for Members of Parliament), the functions of Srawasthi as a hostel ceased. It was then taken over by the Western Provincial Council as its office complex.
