= Wennappuwa =

- Town
- Location within Sri Lanka
- Coordinates: 7°20′48″N 79°50′12″E
- Country: Sri Lanka
- Province: North Western Province
- District: Puttalam District
- Time zone: UTC+5:30 (Sri Lanka Standard Time Zone)
- Postal Code: 61170

Wennappuwa is a town in Puttalam District, North Western Province, Sri Lanka. It is 18 km (11 mi) north of Negombo.

The village of Wennappuwa is mentioned in the Culavamsa as a small farming hamlet.

Religious composition in Wennappuwa DS Division according to 2012 census data is as follows Roman Catholics 53,426-78.44%, Buddhists 12,278-18.03%, Other Christians 1,492-2.19%, Hindus 789–1.16%, Muslims 111–0.16%, Others 15–0.02%.

== Education ==
Wennapuwa is home to the Joseph Vaz College and the Holy Family Girls' School. and a few schools.

== Economy ==
Wennappuwa town has more than 500 businesses. Recently they developed the nearby lake. Wennappuwa became known as Little Italy because of the number of people who migrated to Italy and earned euros. All the state banks and many private banks operate there.
