= Albert Peries =

Sri Lankan politician

Hon. Sir Albert F. Peries KBE

4th Speaker of the Parliament
- In office 13 February 1951 – 18 February 1956
- Prime Minister: D. S. Senanayake; Dudley Senanayake; John Kotelawala
- Preceded by: Alfred Francis Molamure
- Succeeded by: Hameed Hussain Sheikh Ismail
- In office 5 April 1965 – 21 September 1967
- Prime Minister: Dudley Senanayake
- Preceded by: Hugh Fernando
- Succeeded by: Shirley Corea

Member of the Ceylonese Parliament for Nattandiya
- In office 1947–1956
- Preceded by: Seat created
- Succeeded by: Hugh Fernando
- In office 1960–1967
- Preceded by: Hugh Fernando
- Succeeded by: Hugh Fernando

Personal details
- Born: Pattiyapathirennehelage Albert Fredrick Peries; 12 May 1905 Nattandiya, North Western Province, British Ceylon
- Died: September 21, 1967 (aged 62)
- Party: United National Party
- Profession: Proctor

Sir Pattiyapathirennehelage Albert Fredrick Peries, KBE (12 May 1905 – 21 September 1967) was the 4th Speaker of the Parliament of Sri Lanka. Serving as Deputy Speaker, Peries first became Speaker after the sudden death of Francis Molamure, who collapsed and died while presiding over the session.

Peries attended St. Joseph's College, Colombo where he was a keen sportsman. He entered the Ceylon Law College and qualified as a proctor and notary public.

He was elected to the seat of Nattandiya in the 1947 parliamentary election and was re-elected in the 1952, 1960 (March and July), 1965 elections and died in office in 1967. He only lost the 1956 parliamentary election to Hugh Fernando.

Peries was appointed a Knight Commander of the Most Excellent Order of the British Empire in the 1954 Birthday Honours during his first tenure as Speaker. The Sir Albert F. Peiris Sports Complex in Wennappuwa is named after him.

Political offices
Preceded by Alfred Francis Molamure	Speaker of the Parliament; 1951–1956	Succeeded by Hameed Hussain Sheikh Ismail
Preceded by Hugh Fernando	Speaker of the Parliament; 1965–1967	Succeeded by Shirley Corea
