= Hameed Hussain Sheikh Ismail =

Sri Lankan lawyer and politician

Hon. Hameed Hussain Sheikh Ismail MBE

Member of the Ceylon Parliament for Puttalam
- In office 1947–1960
- Preceded by: seat created
- Succeeded by: M. H. Naina Marikkar

5th Speaker of the Parliament
- In office 19 April 1956 – 5 December 1959
- Prime Minister: John Kotelawala; S. W. R. D. Bandaranaike; Wijeyananda Dahanayake
- Preceded by: Albert Peries
- Succeeded by: Tikiri Banda Subasinghe

Personal details
- Born: 19 May 1901 Puttalam
- Died: 3 August 1974 (aged 73)
- Party: Independent

Hameed Hussain Sheikh Ismail (1901–1974) was a distinguished Sri Lankan lawyer and politician who made an important contribution to the country's political history. Born in Puttalam on 19 May 1901, he studied at St. Andrew's College and Wesley College, Colombo, before pursuing a career in law. He represented Puttalam in Parliament from 1947 to 1960 and served as the 5th Speaker of the Parliament of Ceylon from 1956 to 1959. He was the first Muslim to hold this prestigious position, marking an important milestone for the Muslim community in Sri Lanka. He was also appointed a Member of the Order of the British Empire (MBE) in 1949. He passed away on 3 August 1974, leaving behind a notable legacy in Sri Lankan public life.

Hameed Hussain Sheikh Ismail, MBE (19 May 1901 – 3 August 1974) was a Sri Lankan lawyer and politician. He was the 5th Speaker of the Parliament of Sri Lanka.

== Early life and education ==
Born in Puttalam to a middle-class family, started his Qur’anic lessons in 1905. He was educated at St. Andrew's College, Puttalam and at Wesley College, Colombo. He entered the Ceylon Law College, and passed the Proctor's Finals exams in 1925 winning several prizes.

== Legal career ==
Having qualified as a Proctor, Ismail started his legal practice in Colombo, but soon moved it to his home town of Puttalam.

== Political career ==
Entering local politics, Ismail was elected member of the Puttalam Local Board in 1929 and member of the Puttalam Urban Council in 1933 and served as Chairmen of the Puttalam Urban Council from 1936 to 1947. He was elected un-contested in the 1947 general election from the Puttalam electorate as an independent candidate to the Parliament of Ceylon. Soon after he was appointed by Prime Minister D. S. Senanayake as Parliamentary Secretary to the Minister of Food and Co-operative Undertakings. In 1948, he was elected vice president of the All Ceylon Muslim League. Elected in the 1952 general election, he was elected Deputy Speaker and the Deputy Chairman of Committees serving till 1956 and was elected Speaker following the 1956 general election, serving till 1959. In 1961, he was elected president of the All Ceylon Muslim League. He was appointed Member of the Order of the British Empire (MBE) in the 1949 New Year Honours.

Political offices
Preceded by Albert Peries	Speaker of the Parliament; 1956–1959	Succeeded by Tikiri Banda Subasinghe
