= Parliament of Ceylon =

Legislative body of British Ceylon

- British Ceylon & Dominion of Ceylon

Type
- Type: Bicameral
- Houses: House of Representatives; Senate

History
- Established: 1947
- Disbanded: 1972
- Preceded by: State Council of Ceylon
- Succeeded by: National State Assembly

Elections
- Last House of Representatives election: 1970 Ceylonese parliamentary election

The Parliament of Ceylon was the legislative body of British Ceylon & Dominion of Ceylon (now Sri Lanka) established in 1947 by the Soulbury Constitution, prior to independence on 4 February 1948. Parliament replaced the State Council of Ceylon.

Parliament was based on the Westminster model with an upper house, the Senate, whose members were indirectly elected or appointed, and a lower house, the House of Representatives, whose members were directly elected or appointed. The House of Representatives consisted of 101 members, of whom 95 were elected and six appointed by the Governor-General (increased to 157 in 1960, 151 elected and six appointed). The Senate consisted of 30 Members, of whom 15 were elected by the House of Representatives and 15 appointed by the Governor-General.

The Senate was abolished on 2 October 1971 by the eighth amendment to the Soulbury Constitution. The new Republican Constitution of Sri Lanka, adopted on 22 May 1972, replaced the House of Representatives (and Parliament) with the unicameral National State Assembly. The members elected in 1970, continued to hold their seats in the new National State Assembly. The ruling coalition decided early with its majority in parliament that the legislative term after adoption of the new constitution was extended by two years so that the National State Assembly had five years until 1977 when the first general elections under the new constitution were held.

== See also ==
- Legislative Council of Ceylon
- Parliament of Sri Lanka
- State Council of Ceylon
