= Parliament of Sri Lanka =

Supreme legislative body of Sri Lanka

Coordinates: 6.8868°N 79.9187°E

Parliament of the Democratic Socialist Republic of Sri Lanka ශ්‍රී ලංකා ප්‍රජාතාන්ත්‍රික සමාජවාදී ජනරජයේ පාර්ලිමේන්තුව இலங்கை சனநாயக சோசலிச குடியரசின் நாடாளுமன்றம்
- 17th Parliament
- National Emblem of Sri Lanka

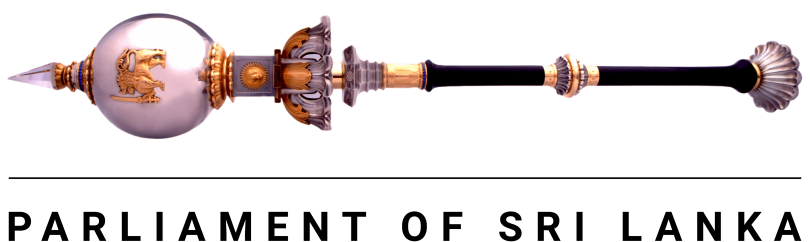

Type
- Type: Unicameral

History
- Founded: 7 September 1978
- Preceded by: National State Assembly

Leadership
- Speaker: Jagath Wickramaratne, NPP since 17 December 2024
- Deputy Speaker and Chairman of Committees: Rizvie Salih, NPP since 21 November 2024
- Deputy Chairman of Committees: Hemali Weerasekara, NPP since 21 November 2024
- Prime Minister: Harini Amarasuriya, NPP since 24 September 2024
- Leader of the Opposition: Sajith Premadasa, SJB since 3 January 2020
- Secretary General: Kushani Rohanadeera since 23 May 2023

Structure
- Seats: 225
- Political groups: Government (159): NPP (159); Opposition (66): SJB (40); ITAK (8); NDF (5); SLPP (3); SLMC (3); SB (1); UNP (1); DTNA (1); TNPF (1); ACMC (1); SLLP (1); IND (1)
- Length of term: 5 years

Elections
- Voting system: Open list proportional representation
- First election: 15 February 1989
- Last election: 14 November 2024
- Next election: By 21 February 2030

Meeting place
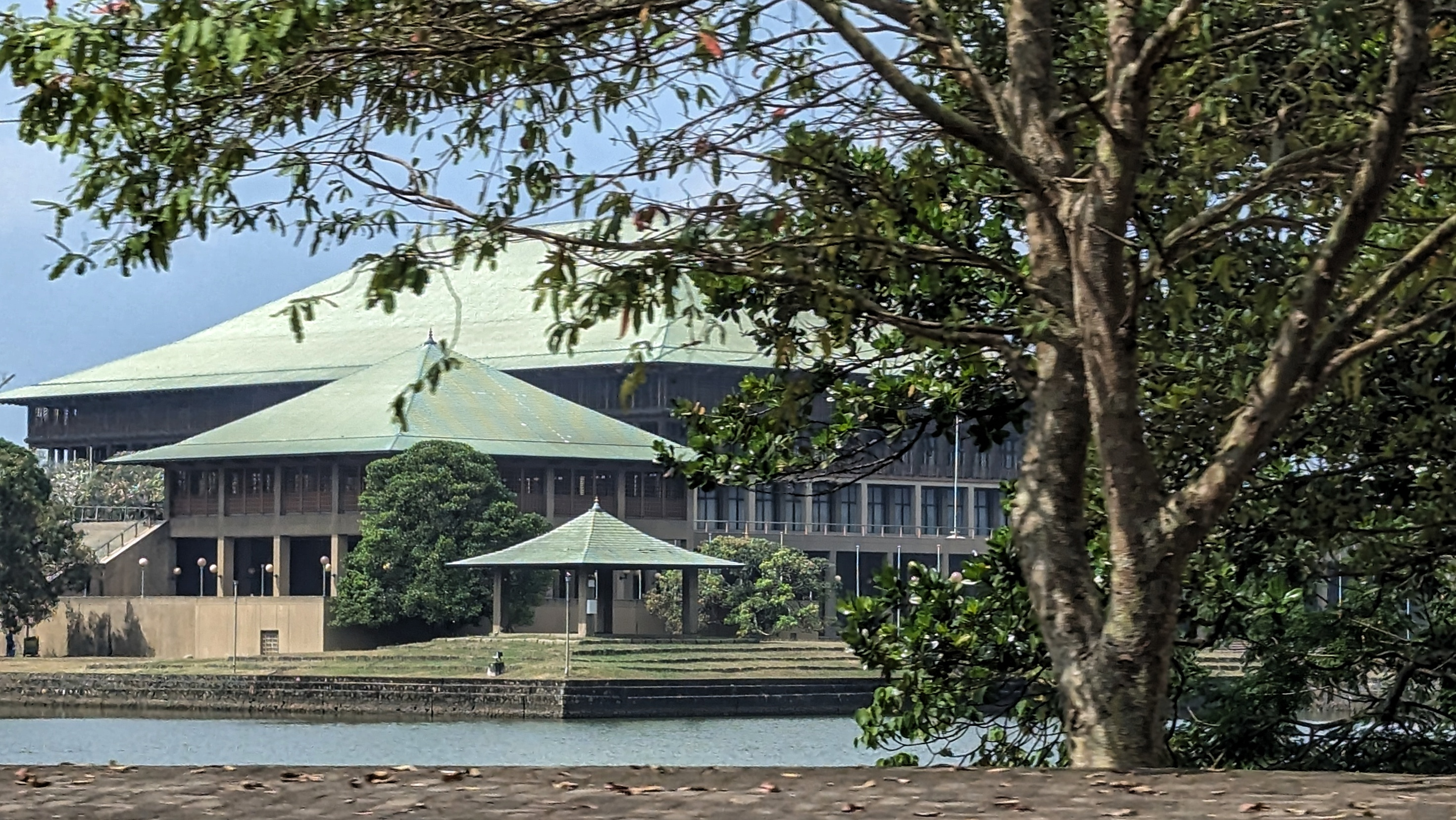
- Sri Lankan Parliament Complex; Sri Jayawardenepura Kotte; Sri Lanka

Website
- www.parliament.lk

Constitution
- Constitution of Sri Lanka

The Parliament of the Democratic Socialist Republic of Sri Lanka (Sinhala: ශ්‍රී ලංකා පාර්ලිමේන්තුව, romanized: Śrī Laṇkā Pārlimentuvā; Tamil: இலங்கை நாடாளுமன்றம், romanized: Ilaṅkai nāṭāḷumaṉṟam') is the supreme legislative body of Sri Lanka. It alone possesses legislative supremacy and thereby ultimate power over all other political bodies in the island. It is modelled after the British Parliament. The 17th Parliament of Sri Lanka convened for the first time on 21 November 2024.

It consists of 225 members known as Members of Parliament (MPs). Members are elected by proportional representation for five-year terms, with universal suffrage.

The President of Sri Lanka has the power to summon, suspend, prorogue, or terminate a legislative session and to dissolve the Parliament. The President can dissolve Parliament only after the lapse of 2 1/2 years or if a 2/3 majority of the Members of Parliament requests dissolution. The action of the president to either suspend or dissolve the Parliament is subject to legal scrutiny of the Supreme Court of Sri Lanka. The Speaker or, in his absence, the Deputy Speaker and Chairman of Committees or the Deputy Chairman of Committees, presides over Parliament.

== Standing Orders of Parliament ==
The Standing Orders of Parliament are the agreed rules under which procedure, debate, and the conduct of Members in the House are regulated. It defines the procedure for the functioning of Parliament, thus becoming an important source of Parliamentary Procedure. Standing Orders have the status of rules under the Constitution, and date back to the first set of Standing Orders adopted by the Legislative Council of Ceylon in 1912, based those of the Parliament of the United Kingdom. These have been changed multiple times and the current set of Standing Orders dates back to 1979.

== Powers ==
Following the Westminster model, all legislation in Sri Lanka must be passed by the Parliament to become law and it controls taxation and the supply of money to the government. Parliament's ability to make laws, includes those that have retrospective effect and repealing or amending any provision of the Constitution, or adding any provision to the Constitution. Government ministers must regularly answer questions in Parliament and there are a number of select committees which scrutinise particular issues and the workings of the government.

== Privileges ==
Under the Parliament (Powers and Privileges) Act, Parliament and its members are entitled to legal immunity to ensure freedom of speech, freedom from arrest on civil matters and ensure publication of the reports, papers, minutes, votes or proceedings of Parliament. In addition to the privileges laid out in the act, Parliament and its members are entitled to the same parliamentary privilege in the United Kingdom. Parliament and any committee can summon any person or request any record or document to be produced before Parliament or the committee.

== History ==
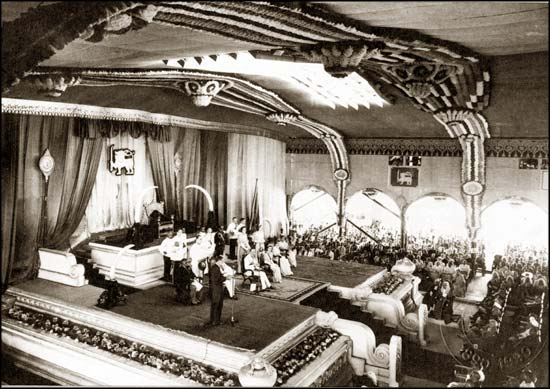
The 1947 opening of the first parliament at Independence Square by Prince Henry, Duke of Gloucester in the presence of D.S. Senanayake, the first Prime Minister of Ceylon.

The first legislature established in Ceylon was the Executive Council and the legislative council, which were established on 13 March 1833, according to the recommendations of the Colebrook-Cameron commission. The Executive Council was composed of the Colonial Secretary, the officer commanding the Military Forces, the Attorney General, the Auditor-General and the Treasurer. The duties of the council were advisory and the Governor of Ceylon, who presided over their meetings and consulted them, was at liberty to disregard their advice. At first it was made up of only British officials but later included native citizens. At the beginning 16, and later 49 members, were elected for the legislative council, but a limited number of people were qualified to vote.

In 1931, the Legislative Council was dissolved and in its place a more powerful State Council of Ceylon was established, with 50 out of its 61 members elected by universal adult franchise as provided by the Donoughmore Constitution.

Prior to the granting of independence and the establishment of the Dominion of Ceylon on 4 February 1948, a new bicameral parliament was established in 1947, according to the recommendations of the Soulbury Commission after the State Council was dissolved. It was based on the Westminster model with an upper house, the Senate, whose members were appointed and a lower house of parliament, the House of Representatives, whose members were directly elected. The House of Representatives consisted of 101 members where 95 members were elected by First-past-the-post, where the remaining 6 members were directly appointed. By a Delimitation commission, the Seats in the House of Representatives was increased to 151 in 1960. The Senate consisted of 30 members, 15 of whom were appointed proportional to the Party representation of the House of Representatives and 15 nominated by the Governor-General of Ceylon on the advice of the Prime Minister. Senators were appointed for a term of 6 years and they were divided to 3 cycles where 1/3 of the Senate is up for election once in 2 years.

The Senate was abolished on 2 October 1971. On 22 May 1972, when the 1st Republican constitution was enacted, the House of Representatives was replaced with the National State Assembly, which had 168 elected members. This was then replaced by the Parliament of Sri Lanka, when the current Constitution of the Democratic Socialist Republic of Sri Lanka was enacted on 7 September 1978.

Initially, the Creators of the 2nd Republican Constitution of 1978 introduced a Unicameral Parliament consisting of 196 members; all elected by Proportional Representation from 22 electoral districts. But the 14th Amendment to the Constitution, which was passed on 24 May 1988, increased the number of seats of the Parliament up to 225, by adding 29 seats where the members were appoint by the National list.

In 1987, a grenade was lobbed into a conference room inside the Parliament complex where government MPs were meeting. Two people were killed and sixteen were injured, but the target of the attack, President J. R. Jayawardene escaped unharmed. The Marxist–Leninist Janatha Vimukthi Peramuna claimed responsibility for the attack.

In 2015, following the parliamentary election, the two major parties of Sri Lanka (the United National Party and Sri Lanka Freedom Party) signed a memorandum of understanding to form a national unity government, in an attempt to address and rectify major unresolved issues following the end of the country's 26-year long ethnic conflict. This was the first time in Sri Lanka's political history that the two major parties agreed to work together in a joint government. UNP Leader Ranil Wickremesinghe, whose party won the most seats, was appointed prime minister, and the joint government lasted until 2018.

== Members and elections ==
Of the 225 members of parliament, 196 are elected from 22 electoral districts, which are multi-member. The remaining 29 MPs are elected from National Lists allocated to the parties (and independent groups) in proportion to their share of the national vote.

=== Officers ===
When Parliament first meets after a general election, it will elect three members to serve as the Speaker, Deputy Speaker and Chairman of Committees (known simply as the Deputy Speaker) and the Deputy Chairman of Committees. Whilst presiding, the Speaker or Deputy Speaker wears ceremonial dress.

== Parliament Secretariat ==
The Parliament Secretariat, headed by the Secretary General of Parliament (from 1978.09.07 to date), is in charge of all its administrative duties. Until 1978, September 06, the post was known as Clerk of Parliament. The Secretary General is appointed by the President, subject to the approval of the Constitutional Council. The Sergeant-at-Arms is responsible for the maintenance of law, order, and security on the House's premises and acts also as master-of-ceremonies. The Serjeant-at-Arms carries the ceremonial mace, a symbol of the authority of the People and of the Parliament, into the House each day in front of the Speaker, and the Mace is laid upon the Table of the House during sittings. Currently, the parliament secretariat administration is divided into nine departments.

These departments are:

- Department of Serjeant-at-Arms
- Department of Administration
- Hansard Department
- Department of the Co-ordinating Engineer
- Department of Catering and Housekeeping
- Department of Information Systems and Management
- Department of Legislative Services
- Department of Finance & Supplies
- Department of Communication

The Staff Advisory Committee (SAC) established under the Parliamentary Staff Act provides advice and guidance to the Parliamentary Secretariat with respect to matters concerning Parliamentary staff. The SAC consists of the Speaker (Chairman), the Leader of the House, the Minister of Finance and the Leader of the Opposition. Secretariat maintains the Speaker's Residence and the Madiwela Housing Complex for MPs and the nineteen-roomed holiday bungalow for MPs, General's House in Nuwara Eliya. Parliament also owns Mumtaz Mahal which was the former residence of the Speaker and Srawasthi Mandiraya the former hostel for MPs. These are now used by other government entities.

== Parliament buildings ==
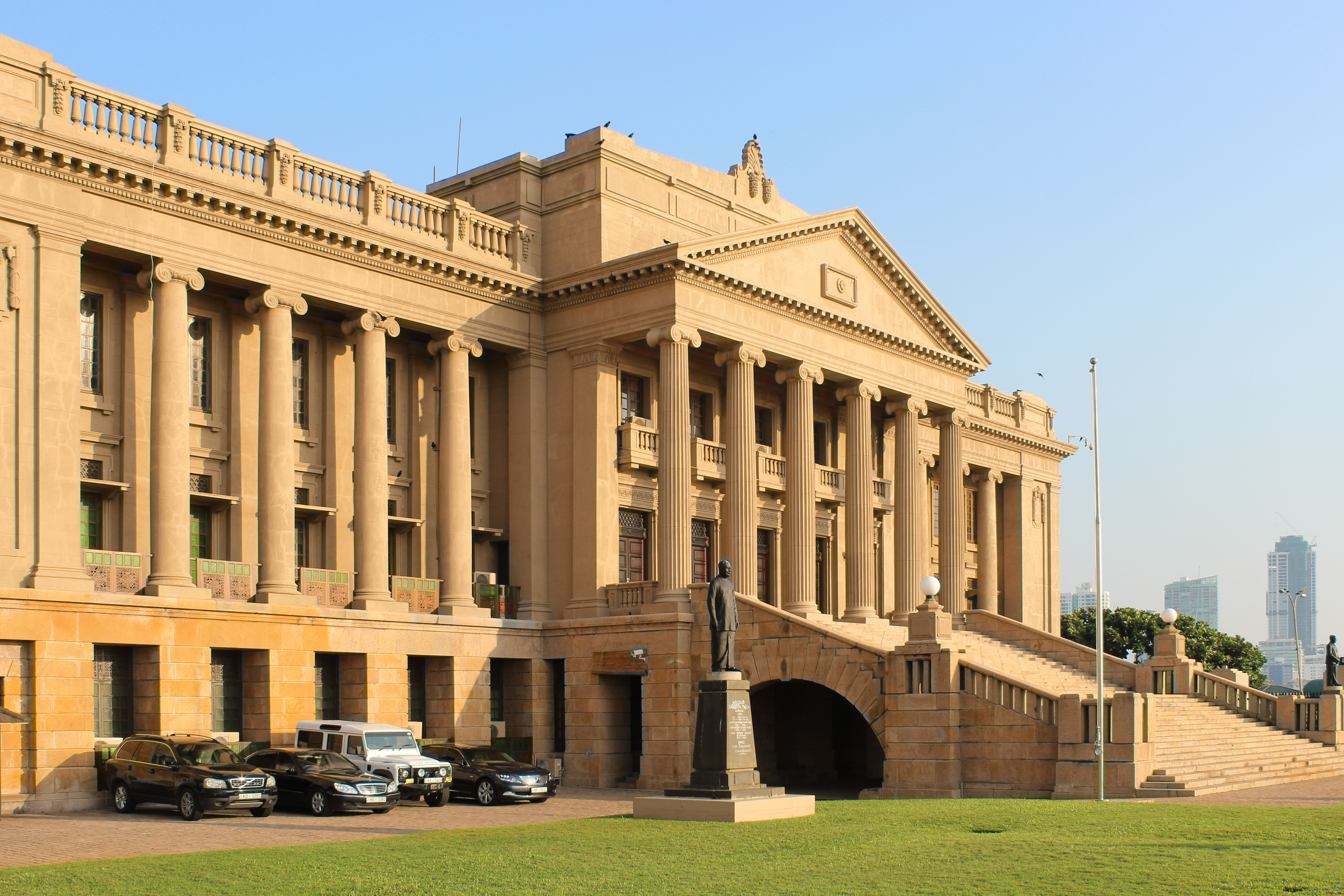
The Old Parliament Building near the Galle Face Green, now the Presidential Secretariat

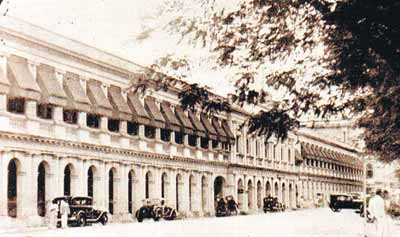
The old Legislative Council Building, Colombo Fort. Today houses the Ministry of Foreign Affairs.

Under the British Colonial government, when the Executive Council and the legislative councils were set up in 1833, they met in a building opposite Gordon Gardens, which is now the "Republic Building", occupied by the Ministry of Foreign Affairs. On 29 January 1930 the British Governor of Ceylon, Sir Herbert Stanley (1927–1931), opened what is now the Old Parliament Building fronting the ocean at Galle Face, Colombo, designed for meetings of the Legislative Council. It was subsequently used by the State Council (1931–1947), the House of Representatives (1947–1972), the National State Assembly (1972–1977) and the Parliament of Sri Lanka (1977–1982). Today, the Old Parliament Building is used by the Presidential Secretariat.

In 1967 under Speaker Albert F. Peris, the leaders of the political parties unanimously resolved that a new Parliament building be constructed on the opposite side of Beira Lake from the existing Parliament at Galle Face, but no further action was taken. While Stanley Tillekeratne was the Speaker (1970–1977), the leaders of the political parties entrusted the drawing up of plans for a new Parliament building to architects, but the project was subsequently abandoned.

On 4 July 1979, Prime Minister Ranasinghe Premadasa obtained sanction from Parliament to construct a new Parliament Building at Duwa, a 5 hectare (12 acre) island in the Diyawanna Oya (off Baddegana Road, Pita Sri Jayawardenepura Kotte), about 16 kilometres (9.9 mi) east of Colombo. The island was where the palace of the King Vikramabahu III's powerful chief minister Nissaka Alakesvara had been constructed in 1369. It had belonged to E. W. Perera prior to being vested in the state.

The building was designed by architect Deshamanya Geoffrey Bawa and built with Sri Lankan funds. On 29 April 1982, the new Parliamentary Complex was declared open by President J. R. Jayewardene.

== Current parliament ==
Composition of the 17th Parliament of Sri Lanka.

== See also ==
- Politics of Sri Lanka
- Committee On Public Enterprises (Sri Lanka)
- List of legislatures by country
