= 2nd State Council of Ceylon =

1936–1947 meeting of the Sri Lankan legislature

←	1st	1st	→
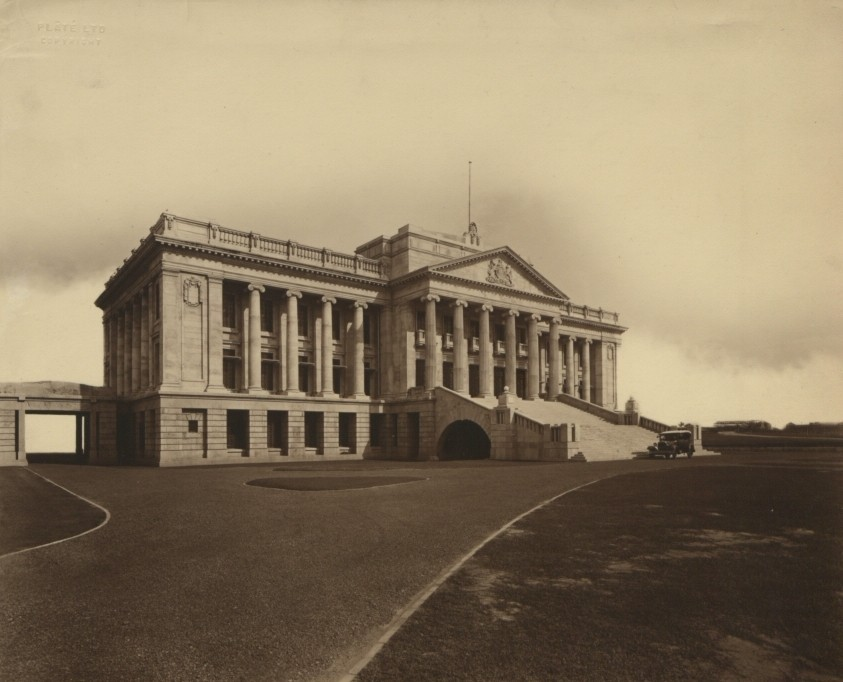

Overview
- Legislative body: State Council of Ceylon
- Meeting place: Old Parliament Building
- Term: 17 March 1936 – 4 July 1947
- Election: 22 February – 7 March 1936
- Government: 2nd Board
- Website: parliament.lk

State Councillors
- Members: 58
- Speaker: Waithilingam Duraiswamy
- Deputy Speaker and Chairman of Committees: Susantha de Fonseka
- Deputy Chairman of Committees: R. S. Tennekoon
- Leader of the House: D. B. Jayatilaka (1936–42); D. S. Senanayake (1942–47)

The 2nd State Council of Ceylon was a meeting of the State Council of Ceylon, with the membership determined by the results of the 1936 state council election held between 22 February and 7 March 1936. The parliament met for the first time on 17 March 1936 and was dissolved on 4 July 1947.

== Election ==
The 2nd state council election was held between 22 February and 7 March 1936 in 43 of the 50 constituencies. The remaining seven constituencies only had a single nomination each and consequently the candidates were elected without a vote.

The new state council met for the first time on 17 March 1936 and elected Waithilingam Duraiswamy, Susantha de Fonseka and R. S. Tennekoon as Speaker, Deputy Speaker and Chairman of Committees and Deputy Chairman of Committees respectively.

== Deaths, resignations and removals ==
- September 1937 – A. E. Rajapakse (Negombo) died. C. E. P. de Silva won the by-election held on 15 January 1938.
- May 1938 – S. O. Canagaratnam (Batticaloa South) died. S. Dharmaretnam won the by-election held in September 1938.
- October 1939 – Neil Hewavitarne (Udugama) died. Simon Abeywickrema won the by-election held 9 March 1940.
- September 1940 – Charles Batuwantudawe (Kalutara) died. Upali Batuwantudawe won the by-election held 21 December 1940.
- January 1941 – Naysum Saravanamuttu (Colombo North) died. George R. de Silva won the by-election.
- February 1942 – W. A. de Silva (Matara) resigned from office. Thomas Amarasuriya won the by-election held in March 1942.
- February 1942 – C. E. P. de Silva (Negombo) died. H. de Z. Siriwardena won the by-election.
- July 1942 – Philip Gunawardena (Avissawella) vacated office following his escape from detention to India. Bernard Jayasuriya won the by-election held 28 February 1943.
- May 1943 – D. D. Gunasekera (Bandarawela) resigned from office. J. G. Rajakulendran won the by-election held in October 1943.
- May 1943 – R. Sri Pathmanathan (Mannar-Mullaitivu) died. Gnanamuthu Isaac won the by-election on 28 August 1943. At the by-election held in May 1944 Jeganathan Tyagarajah was elected.
- June 1943 – E. W. Abeygunasekera (Nuwara Eliya) resigned. M. D. Banda won the by-election held in October 1943.
- June 1943 – H. A. Goonesekera (Balangoda) resigned. Alexander Francis Molamure won the by-election held in October 1943.
- June 1943 – E. R. Tambimuttu (Trincomalee-Batticaloa) dismissed. V. Nalliah won the by-election.
- July 1943 – J. H. Ilangantileke (Puttalam) died. U. B. Wanninayake won the by-election held on 27 November 1943.
- October 1943 – G. C. Rambukpotha (Bibile) died. Wijeyananda Dahanayake won the by-election in 1944
- August 1944 – Siripala Samarakkody (Narammala) died. Richard Gotabhaya Senanayake won the by-election.
- April 1945 – H. R. Freeman (Anuradhapura) died. P. B. Bulankulame won the by-election.
- May 1945 – D. M. Rajapaksa (Hambantota) died. D. A. Rajapaksa won the by-election.
- October 1946 – R. C. Kannangara (Morawaka) died. S. A. Wickramasinghe won the by-election.

== Members ==
Name	Appointed/ Elected	Constituency	Votes	Majority	Took office	Left office	Notes	Ref.
E. W. Abeygunasekera	Elected	Nuwara Eliya			7 March 1936	June 1943	Dismissed from office, succeeded by M. D. Banda	
Simon Abeywickrema	Elected	Udugama			9 March 1940	4 July 1947	Succeeds Neil Hewavitarne	
Bernard Aluwihare	Elected	Matale			22 February 1936			
H. W. Amarasuriya	Elected	Galle		23,852	25 February 1936			
Thomas Amarasuriya	Elected	Moratuwa			19 March 1942	4 July 1947	Succeeds W. A. de Silva	
M. D. Banda	Elected	Nuwara Eliya	-	-	October 1943		Succeeds E. W. Abeygunasekera, Acting Minister of Labour, Industry and Commerce (1945)	
S. W. R. D. Bandaranaike	Elected	Veyangoda	-	-	19 March 1936		Minister of Local Administration (1936–47)	
Charles Batuwantudawe	Elected	Kalutara			29 February 1936	13 September 1940	Died in office, succeeded by Upali Batuwantudawe	
Upali Batuwantudawe	Elected	Kalutara					Succeeds Charles Batuwantudawe	
Clement Johnston Black	Appointed							
P. B. Bulankulame	Elected	Anuradhapura			21 April 1945	4 July 1947	Succeeds H. R. Freeman	
S. O. Canagaratnam	Elected	Batticaloa South			1936	1938	Died in office, succeeded by S. Dharmaretnam	
Maurice John Cary	Appointed	European						
Claude Corea	Elected	Chilaw			19 March 1936	1946	Minister of Labour, Industry and Commerce (1936–46)	
Wijeyananda Dahanayake	Elected	Bibile			1944	4 July 1947	Succeeds G. C. Rambukpotha	
Susantha de Fonseka	Elected	Panadura					Deputy Speaker and Chairman of Committees (1936–47)	
C. E. P. de Silva	Elected	Negombo			15 January 1938	27 February 1942	Succeeds A. E. Rajapakse. Died in office, succeeded by H. de Z. Siriwardena	
George E. de Silva	Elected	Kandy			29 February 1936		Minister of Health (1942–47)	
George R. de Silva	Elected	Colombo North					Succeeded Naysum Saravanamuttu	
W. A. de Silva	Elected	Moratuwa			1936	18 February 1943	Minister of Health (1936–42) Resigned from office, succeeded by Thomas Amarasuriya	
A. P. de Zoysa	Elected	Colombo South			10 October 1936			
Francis de Zoysa	Elected	Balapitiya			22 February 1936			
S. Dharmaretnam	Elected	Batticaloa South			17 September 1938	4 July 1947	Succeeds S. O. Canagaratnam	
Waithilingam Duraiswamy	Elected	Kayts	-	-	15 January 1936	4 July 1947	Speaker (1936–47)	
Razik Fareed	Appointed	Muslims	-	-	12 March 1936			
H. R. Freeman	Elected	Anuradhapura			15 January 1936	1945	Died in office, succeeded by P. B. Bulankulame	
R. P. Gaddum	Appointed	European			17 May 1938	10 January 1939	Succeeds E. C. Villiers. Resigned from office, succeeded by E. C. Villiers	
H. A. Goonesekera	Elected	Balangoda			25 February 1936	25 May 1943	Dismissed from office, succeeded by Alexander Francis Molamure	
A. E. Goonesinha	Elected	Colombo Central			22 February 1936	1942	Succeeded by M. C. M. Kaleel	
Francis Huntly Griffith	Appointed							
D. D. Gunasekera	Elected	Bandarawela			22 February 1936	25 May 1943	Resigned from office, succeeded by J. G. Rajakulendran	
Philip Gunawardena	Elected	Avissawella			29 February 1936	July 1942	Vacated office in July 1942, succeeded by Bernard Jayasuriya	
Senerat Gunewardene	Elected	Gampola			28 February 1936			
Neil Hewavitarne	Elected	Udugama			27 February 1936	31 October 1939	Died in office, succeeded by Simon Abeywickrema	
Raja Hewavitarne	Elected	Matara			5 March 1936			
J. H. Ilangantileke	Elected	Puttalam			29 February 1936	27 July 1943	Died in office, succeeded by U. B. Wanninayake	
Gnanamuthu Isaac	Elected	Mannar-Mullaitivu			1943	1944	Succeeds R. Sri Pathmanathan, succeeded by Jeganathan Tyagarajah	
T. B. Jayah	Appointed	Muslims	-	-	12 March 1936	4 July 1947		
A. P. Jayasuriya	Elected	Horana			25 February 1936	4 July 1947		
Bernard Jayasuriya	Elected	Avissawella			28 February 1943	4 July 1947	Succeeds Philip Gunawardena	
D. P. Jayasuriya	Elected	Gampaha			1936			
D. B. Jayatilaka	Elected	Kelaniya	-	-	15 January 1936	1943	Minister of Home Affairs (1936–42), resigned from office, succeeded by J. R. Jayewardene	
Robert Edward Jayatilaka	Elected	Ruwanwella			1939	4 July 1947	Succeeded N. M. Perera	
J. R. Jayewardene	Elected	Kelaniya			1943	4 July 1947	Succeeds D. B. Jayatilaka	
M. C. M. Kaleel	Elected	Colombo Central			1942		Succeeds A. E. Goonesinha	
C. W. W. Kannangara	Elected	Matugama			1936		Minister of Education (1936–47)	
R. C. Kannangara	Elected	Morawaka			3 March 1936	14 October 1946	Died in office, succeeded by S. A. Wickramasinghe	
Henry Kotelawala	Elected	Badulla			26 October 1936			
John Kotelawala	Elected	Kurunegala	-	-	15 January 1936		Minister of Communications and Works (1936–47)	
Patrick de Silva Kularatne	Elected	Balapitiya						
Jayaweera Kuruppu	Elected	Ratnapura			22 February 1936			
A. Mahadeva	Elected	Jaffna			25 February 1936	4 July 1947	Minister of Home Affairs (1942–47)	
Alexander Francis Molamure	Elected	Balangoda			October 1943	4 July 1947	Succeeds H. A. Goonesekera	
V. Nalliah	Elected	Trincomalee-Batticaloa			1943	4 July 1947	Succeeds E. R. Tambimuttu	
K. Natesa Iyer	Elected	Hatton			2 March 1936			
S. Natesan	Elected	Kankesanthurai			27 February 1936	4 July 1947		
Hubert Ernest Newnham	Appointed				6 March 1939	18 May 1943		
E. A. Nugawela	Elected	Galagedara			24 February 1936			
John William Oldfield	Appointed	European			28 April 1936			
Howard Frank Parfitt	Appointed				12 March 1936	18 May 1943	Resigned from office.	
I. X. Pereira	Appointed	Indian Tamils	-	-	12 March 1936	4 July 1947	Minister of Labour, Industry and Commerce (1946–47)	
N. M. Perera	Elected	Ruwanwella			28 February 1936	1939	Removed from office, succeeded by R. E. Jayetilleke	
G. G. Ponnambalam	Elected	Point Pedro			22 February 1936	4 July 1947		
J. G. Rajakulendran	Elected	Bandarawela			October 1943	4 July 1947	Succeeds D. D. Gunasekera	
D. A. Rajapaksa	Elected	Hambantota					Succeeds D. M. Rajapaksa	
D. M. Rajapaksa	Elected	Hambantota	17,046		7 March 1936	1945	Died in office, succeeded by D. A. Rajapaksa	
A. E. Rajapakse	Elected	Negombo			1936	20 September 1937	Died in office, succeeded by C. E. P. de Silva	
G. C. Rambukpotha	Elected	Bibile			5 March 1936	27 October 1943	Died in office. Succeeded by Wijeyananda Dahanayake	
Abeyratne Ratnayaka	Elected	Dumbara			26 February 1936			
Harris Leuke Ratwatte	Elected	Kegalle			5 March 1936			
Siripala Samarakkody	Elected	Narammala			22 February 1936	August 1944	Died in office, succeeded by Richard Gotabhaya Senanayake	
Naysum Saravanamuttu	Elected	Colombo North			22 February 1936	1941	Died in office, succeeded by George R. de Silva	
Dudley Senanayake	Elected	Dedigama	17,045		2 March 1936		Minister of Agriculture and Lands (1946–47)	
D. S. Senanayake	Elected	Minuwangoda	-	-	1936		Minister of Agriculture and Lands (1936–46)	
Richard Gotabhaya Senanayake	Elected	Narammala				4 July 1947	Succeeds Siripala Samarakkody	
H. de Z. Siriwardena	Elected	Negombo			1942	4 July 1947	Succeeds C. E. P. de Silva	
Bennet Soysa	Elected	Nuwara Eliya						
R. Sri Pathmanathan	Elected	Mannar-Mullaitivu			7 March 1936	1943	Died in office, succeeded by Gnanamuthu Isaac	
E. R. Tambimuttu	Elected	Trincomalee-Batticaloa			22 February 1936	June 1943	Dismissed from office, succeeded by V. Nalliah	
R. S. Tennekoon	Elected	Katugampola			3 March 1936		Deputy Chairman of Committees (1936–47)	
Jeganathan Tyagarajah	Elected	Mannar-Mullaitivu			1944		Succeeds Gnanamuthu Isaac	
Evelyn Charles Villiers	Appointed	European			12 March 1936; 14 February 1939	30 April 1938; 7 April 1947	Resigned from office, succeeded by R. P. Gaddum. Succeeds R. P. Gaddum	
S. P. Vythilingam	Elected	Talawakelle			5 March 1936			
David Wanigasekera	Elected	Weligama			29 February 1936	4 July 1947		
U. B. Wanninayake	Elected	Puttalam			27 November 1943	4 July 1947	Succeeds J. H. Ilangantileke	
George Roland Whitby	Appointed							
S. A. Wickramasinghe	Elected	Morawaka			1946	4 July 1947	Succeeds R. C. Kannangara	
George Alfred Henry Wille	Appointed	Burgher			12 March 1936	4 July 1947		
