= List of members of the Sri Lankan Parliament who died in office =

The following is a list of members of the Parliament of Sri Lanka and its antecedent bodies who died in office.

== State Council of Ceylon (1931–1947) ==
Member	Constituency	Date of death	Age at death (years)	Cause
Godfrey Edward Madawala	Narammala	September 1932	54	
S. O. Canagaratnam	Batticaloa South	May 1938	57-58	
Neil Hewavitarne	Udugama	30 October 1939		
Charles Batuwantudawe	Kalutara	13 September 1940	62	
Naysum Saravanamuttu	Colombo North	19 January 1941	43-44	
C. E. P. de Silva	Negombo	27 February 1942		
R. Sri Pathmanathan	Mannar-Mullaitivu	5 May 1943		
J. H. Ilangantileke	Puttalam	27 July 1943		
G. C. Rambukpotha	Bibile	27 October 1943	58	
Siripala Samarakkody	Narammala	22 August 1944	37	Typhoid fever
H. R. Freeman	Anuradhapura	April 1945	81	
D. M. Rajapaksa	Hambantota	18 May 1945	49	Heart attack
R. C. Kannangara	Morawaka	14 October 1946	26	

== Parliament of Ceylon (1947–1972) ==
Member	Party	Constituency	Date of death	Age at death (years)	Cause
S. W. R. D. Bandaranaike	SLFP	Attanagalla	26 September 1959	60	Assassinated
Bernard Aluwihare	UNP	Matale	22 January 1961	58	Cancer

== Parliament of Sri Lanka (1978–present) ==
Member	Party	Constituency	Date of death	Age at death (years)	Cause
M. Canagaratnam	UNP	Pottuvil	20 April 1980	56	Assassinated
Bandulahewa Senadheera	UNP	Karandeniya	January 1982		
Jinadasa Weerasinghe	UNP	Tangalle	31 July 1987	61	Assassinated
Keerthisena Abeywickrama	UNP	Deniyaya	18 August 1987	61	Assassinated
G. V. S. de Silva	UNP	Habaraduwa	1 May 1988		Assassinated
Lionel Jayatilleke	UNP	Habaraduwa	26 September 1988	64	Assassinated
W. M. G. T. Banda	UNP	Galagedara	1989		Assassinated
Lesley Ranagala	UNP	Borella	1989		Assassinated
M. A. Daniel	UNP	Kandy	25 June 1989		Assassinated
A. Amirthalingam	TULF	Kankesanthurai	13 July 1989		Assassinated
Daya Sepali Senadheera	UNP	Karandeniya	29 August 1989		Assassinated
Merill Kariyawasam	UNP	Agalawatte	5 September 1989		Assassinated
Sam Tambimuttu	EPRLF	Batticaloa	7 May 1990	57-58	Assassinated
G. Yogasangari	EPRLF	Jaffna	19 June 1990		Assassinated
Ranjan Wijeratne	UNP	National List	2 March 1991	59	Assassinated
Lalith Athulathmudali	DUNF	Colombo	23 April 1993	56	Assassinated
Gamini Dissanayake	UNP	Kandy	24 October 1994	52	Assassinated
Weerasinghe Mallimarachchi	UNP	Colombo	24 October 1994	64	Assassinated (same event with Gamini Dissanayake)
Ossie Abeygunasekera	UNP	Colombo	24 October 1994	44	Assassinated (same event with Gamini Dissanayake and Weerasinghe Mallimarachchi)
Nalanda Ellawala	PA	Ratnapura	11 February 1997	29	Assassinated
A. Thangathurai	TULF	Mutur	5 July 1997	61	Assassinated
M. E. H. Maharoof	UNP	Trincomalee	20 July 1997	58	Assassinated
Bernard Soysa	PA	Colombo	30 December 1997	83	
S. Shanmuganathan	DPLF	Vavuniya	15 July 1998	38	Assassinated
Neelan Tiruchelvam	TULF	National List	29 July 1999	55	Assassinated
Abdul Cader Shahul Hameed	UNP	Kandy	3 September 1999	72	
Savumiamoorthy Thondaman	PA	National List	30 October 1999	86	Heart failure
Nadarajah Atputharajah	EPDP	Jaffna	2 November 1999	36	Assassinated
C. V. Gunaratne	PA	Colombo	7 June 2000		Assassinated
M. Sivasithamparam	TNA	National List	5 June 2002	78	
Lakshman Kadirgamar	UPFA	National List	12 August 2005	73	Assassinated
Joseph Pararajasingham	TNA	National List	25 December 2005	71	Assassinated
Nadarajah Raviraj	TNA	Jaffna	10 November 2006	44	Assassinated
Anwar Ismail	UPFA	National List	13 September 2007		
T. Maheswaran	UNF	Colombo	1 January 2008	41	Assassinated
D. M. Dassanayake	UPFA	Puttalam	8 January 2008	54	Assassinated
Sripathi Sooriyarachchi	UPFA	Gampaha	9 February 2008	45	Road accident
Kiddinan Sivanesan	TNA	Jaffna	6 March 2008	51	Assassinated
Anura Bandaranaike	UPFA	Gampaha	16 March 2008	59	Cancer
Jeyaraj Fernandopulle	UPFA	Gampaha	6 April 2008	55	Assassinated
Reggie Ranatunga	UPFA	Gampaha	31 May 2008	55	
Alick Aluvihare	UNF	Matale	17 May 2009	83	
K. Pathmanathan	TNA	Ampara	21 May 2009	60	
Amarasiri Dodangoda	UPFA	Galle	30 May 2009	67	
Sarath Ranawaka	UNF	Kalutara	25 July 2009	58	
P. Chandrasekaran	UCPF	Nuwara Eliya	1 January 2010	52	Cirrhosis
Noordeen Mashoor	UPFA	Vanni	2 December 2010	48	Heart attack
Jayalath Jayawardena	UNP	Gampaha	30 May 2013	59	Heart attack
Neranjan Wickremasinghe	UPFA	Kurunegala	12 May 2015	53	Heart attack
M. K. A. D. S. Gunawardana	UNF	National List	19 January 2016	68	
Amarakeerthi Athukorala	SLPFA	Polonnaruwa	9 May 2022	57	Lynched by a mob
Sanath Nishantha	SLPFA	Puttalam	25 January 2024	48	Road accident.
K. H. Nandasena	SLPFA	Anuradhapura	4 April 2024	69	
R. Sampanthan	TNA	Trincomalee	30 June 2024	91	
Kosala Jayaweera	NPP	Kegalle	6 April 2025	38	Heart attack

== See also ==
- List of assassinations of the Second JVP Insurrection
- List of assassinations of the Sri Lankan Civil War
