= Tennakoon =

Tennakoon, Tennekoon, Thennakoon, or Tennakorn (Sinhala: තෙන්නකෝන්) is a surname found in Sri Lanka. Notable people with this name include:

== Tennakoon ==
- Deshabandu Tennakoon (born 1971), a Sri Lankan police officer
- Janaka Bandara Tennakoon, a Sri Lankan politician
- Mudiyanse Tennakoon (1934 – 1991), a Sri Lankan politician
- Nilmini Tennakoon (born 1965), a Sri Lankan actress
- P. M. K. Tennakoon (born 1917), a Sri Lankan politician
- Piyasena Tennakoon (1917 – 1982), a Sri Lankan lawyer and politician
- Pramitha Tennakoon (born 1978), a Sri Lankan politician
- Raipiyel Tennakoon (1899 – 1965), a Sri Lankan poet
- Sampath Tennakoon (1959 – 2021), a Sri Lankan actor
- Soma Kumari Tennakoon (1960 – 2009), a Sri Lankan politician
- Upali Tennakoon, a Sri Lankan journalist

== Tennekoon ==
- Anura Tennekoon (born 1946), a Sri Lankan cricketer
- Herbert Tennekoon, a Sri Lankan civil servant
- Panini Tennekoon, a Sri Lankan architect
- R. B. Tennekoon, a Sri Lankan politician
- R. S. Tennekoon, a Sri Lankan politician
- Reginald Tennekoon (born 1912), a Sri Lankan politician and businessman
- T. B. Tennekoon, a Sri Lankan politician
- Victor Tennekoon (1914 – 1990), a Sri Lankan lawyer and jurist
- William Tennekoon, a Sri Lankan banker
- Surangani Tennekoon, 9th Governor of Central Province

== Thennakoon ==
- Daya Thennakoon (1941 – 2020), a Sri Lankan actor
- Kavindya Thennakoon (born 1995), a Sri Lankan activist
- Keerthi Thennakoon, a Sri Lankan governor
