= Commission to Enquire into Bribery in the State Council of Ceylon =

The Commission to Enquire into Bribery, State Council, Ceylon (known as the L. M. D. de Silva Commission ) was a commission of inquiry appointed by British Governor of Ceylon Sir Andrew Caldecott which was in effect from 1941 to 1943, to investigate and inquire into allegations of bribery and corruption among members of the State Council of Ceylon. The Commission consisted Lucien Macull Dominic de Silva a reputed barrister as its chairman.

In April 1943 the Bribery Commissioner found that E. W. Abeygunasekera, Charles Batuwantudawe, D. D. Gunasekera, E. R. Tambimuttu and H. A. Goonesekera had accepted bribes in the exercise of their duties as members of the Home Affairs Committee. They all resigned their positions on the State Council, with the exceptions of Batuwantudawe who had died earlier and Tambimuttu who continued to sit on the council until he was formally expelled.

== See also ==
- Parliamentary Bribery Commission
- Lessons Learnt and Reconciliation Commission

== External list ==
- Commission To Investigate Allegations Of Bribery Or Corruption
- Examining Facets of Corruption in Sri Lanka
