= Jayewardene cabinet =

- 10th Cabinet of Sri Lanka

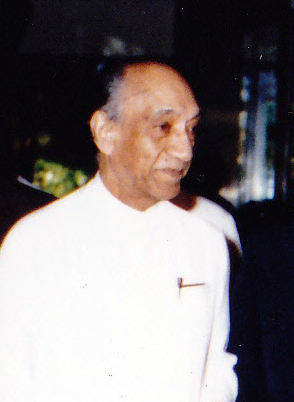
- Date formed: 23 July 1977
- Date dissolved: 2 January 1989

People and organisations
- Head of state: William Gopallawa (1977–78); J. R. Jayewardene (1978–89)
- Head of government: J. R. Jayewardene
- Deputy head of government: Ranasinghe Premadasa
- Member parties: United National Party; Ceylon Workers' Congress (1978–89)
- Status in legislature: Supermajority
- Opposition party: Tamil United Liberation Front (1977–83); Sri Lanka Freedom Party (1983–89)
- Opposition leader: A. Amirthalingam (1977–83); Anura Bandaranaike (1983–88)

History
- Elections: 1977, 1982
- Outgoing election: 1988
- Legislature term: 8th
- Predecessor: Sirimavo Bandaranaike II
- Successor: Premadasa

The Jayewardene cabinet was the central government of Sri Lanka led by Prime Minister (later President) J. R. Jayewardene between 1977 and 1989. It was formed in July 1977 after the parliamentary election and it ended in January 1989 when Jayewardene's second limited term ended. The Jayewardene cabinet saw Sri Lanka move from being a parliamentary republic to the current executive presidency in February 1978.

== Cabinet members ==
Name	Portrait	Party	Office	Took office	Left office	Refs
J. R. Jayewardene		United National Party	Prime Minister	23 July 1977	4 February 1978	
J. R. Jayewardene		United National Party	President	4 February 1978	2 January 1989	
J. R. Jayewardene		United National Party	Minister of Defence	23 July 1977		
J. R. Jayewardene		United National Party	Minister of Planning and Economic Affairs	23 July 1977		
J. R. Jayewardene		United National Party	Minister of Plan Implementation	23 July 1977		
J. R. Jayewardene		United National Party	Minister of Higher Education	14 February 1980		
Ranasinghe Premadasa		United National Party	Minister of Local Government, Housing and Construction	23 July 1977		
Ranasinghe Premadasa		United National Party	Prime Minister	6 February 1978	2 January 1989	
Ranasinghe Premadasa		United National Party	Minister of Highways			
Ranjit Atapattu		United National Party	Minister of Health			
Lalith Athulathmudali		United National Party	Minister of Trade	23 July 1977		
Lalith Athulathmudali		United National Party	Minister of Trade and Shipping			
Lalith Athulathmudali		United National Party	Minister of National Security	23 March 1983		
Ananda Tissa de Alwis		United National Party	Minister of State			
Ronnie de Mel		United National Party	Minister of Finance	23 July 1977		
Ronnie de Mel		United National Party	Minister of Finance and Planning		18 January 1988	
K. W. Devanayakam		United National Party	Minister of Justice	23 July 1977		
K. W. Devanayakam		United National Party	Minister of Home Affairs	14 February 1980		
Gamini Dissanayake		United National Party	Minister of Irrigation, Power and Highways	23 July 1977		
Gamini Dissanayake		United National Party	Minister of Lands and Land Development			
Gamini Dissanayake		United National Party	Minister of Mahaweli Development			
A. C. S. Hameed		United National Party	Minister for Foreign Affairs	23 July 1977		
Srisena Bandara Herath		United National Party	Minister of Food and Co-operatives	23 July 1977		
E. L. B. Hurulle		United National Party	Minister of Cultural Affairs	23 July 1977		
Shelton Jayasinghe		United National Party	Minister Posts and Telecommunications	23 July 1977		
S. de S. Jayasinghe		United National Party	Minister of Fisheries		26 September 1977	
Gamini Jayasuriya		United National Party	Minister of Health	23 July 1977		
Montague Jayawickrama		United National Party	Minister of Public Administration and Home Affairs	23 July 1977		
Montague Jayawickrama		United National Party	Minister of Public Administration			
Montague Jayawickrama		United National Party	Minister of Plantation Industries			
M. D. H. Jayawardena		United National Party	Minister of Plantation Industries	23 July 1977		
Wimala Kannangara		United National Party	Minister of Shipping, Aviation and Tourism	23 July 1977		
Wimala Kannangara		United National Party	Minister of Rural Development			
Asoka Karunaratne		United National Party	Minister of Social Services	23 July 1977		
M. H. M. Naina Marikar		United National Party	Minister of Finance	10 January 1988	3 January 1989	
Cyril Mathew		United National Party	Minister of Industries and Scientific Affairs	23 July 1977		
Wijayapala Mendis		United National Party	Minister of Textile Industry	23 July 1977		
Wijayapala Mendis		United National Party	Minister of Textile Industries			
M. H. Mohamed		United National Party	Minister of Transport	23 July 1977		
Festus Perera		United National Party	Minister of Fisheries	30 October 1977		
Vincent Perera		United National Party	Minister of Parliamentary Affairs and Sports	23 July 1977		
C. Rajadurai		United National Party	Minister of Regional Development	5 April 1979		
C. Rajadurai		United National Party	Minister of Hindu Religious Affairs			
Lionel Senanayake		United National Party	Minister of Agriculture and Lands	23 July 1977		
Lionel Senanayake		United National Party	Minister of Agricultural Development and Research			
C. P. J. Seneviratne		United National Party	Minister of Labour	23 July 1977		
Savumiamoorthy Thondaman		Ceylon Workers' Congress	Minister of Rural Industrial Development	7 September 1978		
Ranil Wickremesinghe		United National Party	Minister of Youth Affairs and Employment	5 October 1978		
Ranil Wickremesinghe		United National Party	Minister of Education	14 February 1980		
Nissanka Wijeyeratne		United National Party	Minister of Education	23 July 1977		
Nissanka Wijeyeratne		United National Party	Minister of Justice	14 February 1980		
D. B. Wijetunga		United National Party	Minister of Information and Broadcasting	23 July 1977		
D. B. Wijetunga		United National Party	Minister of Posts and Telecommunications			
D. B. Wijetunga		United National Party	Minister of Power and Energy			
D. B. Wijetunga		United National Party	Minister of Food, Agricultural Development and Research			
D. B. Wijetunga		United National Party	Minister of Finance			

== Non-cabinet ministers ==
Name	Portrait	Party	Office	Took office	Left office	Refs
Ranjit Atapattu		United National Party	Non-Cabinet Minister of Colombo Group Hospitals			
Dharmasena Attygalle		United National Party	Non-Cabinet Minister of Indigenous Medicine			
Harold Herath		United National Party	Non-Cabinet Minister of Coconut Industries			
Lionel Jayatilleke		United National Party	Non-Cabinet Minister of Education Services			
T. B. Werapitiya		United National Party	Non-Cabinet Minister of Internal Security			

== Deputy ministers ==
Name	Portrait	Party	Office	Took office	Left office	Refs
M. A. Abdul Majeed		United National Party	Deputy Minister of Agriculture and Lands	23 July 1977		
M. A. Abdul Majeed		United National Party	Deputy Minister of Power and Energy			
S. S. Abeysundara		United National Party	Deputy Minister of Fisheries	23 July 1977		
Sumanadasa Abeywickrama		United National Party	Deputy Minister of Agricultural Development and Research			
A. M. S. Adikari		United National Party	Deputy Minister of Irrigation, Power and Highways	23 July 1977		
A. M. S. Adikari		United National Party	Deputy Minister of Lands and Land Development			
Alick Aluwihare		United National Party	Deputy Minister of Plantation Industries	23 July 1977		
M. S. Amarasiri		United National Party	Deputy Minister of Trade	23 July 1977		
M. S. Amarasiri		United National Party	Deputy Minister of Trade and Shipping			
John Amaratunga		United National Party	Deputy Minister of Finance	19 January 1988	9 January 1988	
Lalith Athulathmudali		United National Party	Deputy Minister of Defence	1984		
R. B. Attanayake		United National Party	Deputy Minister of Higher Education			
Dharmasena Attygalle		United National Party	Deputy Minister of Health	23 July 1977		
Gamini Atukorale		United National Party	Deputy Minister of Youth Affairs and Employment			
R. M. Dharmadasa Banda		United National Party	Deputy Minister of Textile Industry	23 July 1977		
R. M. Dharmadasa Banda		United National Party	Deputy Minister of Textile Industries			
W. M. G. T. Banda		United National Party	Deputy Minister of Cultural Affairs	23 July 1977		
K. D. M. C. Bandara		United National Party	Deputy Minister of Agricultural Development and Research			
Harindra Corea		United National Party	Deputy Minister of Public Administration			
Denzil Fernando		United National Party	Deputy Minister of Industries and Scientific Affairs	23 July 1977		
Tyronne Fernando		United National Party	Deputy Minister of Foreign Affairs			
Premaratne Gunasekera		United National Party	Deputy Minister of Public Omnibus Transport			
Premaratne Gunasekera		United National Party	Deputy Minister of Health			
Harold Herath		United National Party	Deputy Minister of Janatha Estates Development			
P. C. Imbulana		United National Party	Deputy Minister of Local Government, Housing and Construction	23 July 1977		
Lionel Jayatilaka		United National Party	Deputy Minister of Education	23 July 1977		
Chandra Karunaratne		United National Party	Deputy Minister of Information and Broadcasting	23 July 1977		
Chandra Karunaratne		United National Party	Deputy Minister of State			
Hiripitiyage Kularatne		United National Party	Deputy Minister of Transport	23 July 1977		
Mervyn Kularatne		United National Party	Deputy Minister of Defence			
M. H. M. Naina Marikar		United National Party	Deputy Minister of Planning and Economic Affairs	23 July 1977		
M. H. M. Naina Marikar		United National Party	Deputy Minister of Finance and Planning	6 February 1978	19 January 1988	
Nanda Mathew		United National Party	Deputy Minister of Shipping, Aviation and Tourism	23 July 1977		
Nanda Mathew		United National Party	Deputy Minister of Mahaweli Development			
Festus Perera		United National Party	Deputy Minister of Finance	23 July 1977	5 February 1978	
Joseph Michael Perera		United National Party	Deputy Minister of Labour	23 July 1977		
Abeyratne Pilapitiya		United National Party	Deputy Minister of Posts and Telecommunications	23 July 1977		
S. K. Piyadasa		United National Party	Deputy Minister of Rural Industrial Development			
G. M. Premachandra		United National Party	Deputy Minister of Highways			
G. V. Punchinilame		United National Party	Deputy Minister of Regional Development			
Sarathchandra Rajakaruna		United National Party	Deputy Minister of Food and co-operatives	23 July 1977		
Shelton Ranaraja		United National Party	Deputy Minister of Justice	23 July 1977		
Percy Samaraweera		United National Party	Deputy Minister of Public Administration and Home Affairs	23 July 1977		
Percy Samaraweera		United National Party	Deputy Minister of Home Affairs			
Weerawanni Samaraweera		United National Party	Deputy Minister of Education			
J. L. Sirisena		United National Party	Deputy Minister of Social Services	23 July 1977		
Edwin Tillakaratne		United National Party	Deputy Minister of Parliamentary Affairs and Sports	23 July 1977		
Harshanath Wanigasekera		United National Party	Deputy Minister of Rural Development			
D. B. Welagedara		United National Party	Deputy Minister of Plan Implementation	23 July 1977		
T. B. Werapitiya		United National Party	Deputy Minister of Defence	23 July 1977		
Ranil Wickremesinghe		United National Party	Deputy Minister of Foreign Affairs	23 July 1977		
V. L. Wijemanne		United National Party	Deputy Minister of State Plantations			
A.M.R.B Aththanayake		United National Party	Deputy Minister of High Education	23 July 1977		

== District ministers ==
Name	Portrait	Party	Office	Took office	Left office	Refs
R. M. Abeykoon		United National Party	District Minister for Monaragala			
H. B. Abeyratne		United National Party	District Minister for Anuradhapura			
Keerthisena Abeywickrama		United National Party	District Minister for Matara			
M. L. M. Aboosally		United National Party	District Minister for Ratnapura			
R. M. Appuhamy		United National Party	District Minister for Badulla			
P. M. B. Cyril		United National Party	District Minister for Hambantota			
P. Dayaratna		United National Party	District Minister for Ampara	1978		
Merril de Silva		United National Party	District Minister for Polonnaruwa			
W. M. P. B. Dissanayake		United National Party	District Minister for Kandy			
K. W. R. M. Ekananayake		United National Party	District Minister for Matale			
Tudor Gunasekara		United National Party	District Minister for Gampaha			
Renuka Herath		United National Party	District Minister for Nuwara Eliya			
Indradasa Hettiarachchi		United National Party	District Minister for Kalutara			
M. Kanagaratnam		United National Party	District Minister for Batticaloa	1978		
Rupa Karunathilake		United National Party	District Minister for Galle	1982	1988	
G. V. S. de Silva		United National Party	District Minister for Galle	1988	1988	
M. E. H. Maharoof		United National Party	District Minister for Mannar	1978		
G. D. Mahindasoma		United National Party	District Minister for Vavuniya	1978		
Weerasinghe Mallimarachchi		United National Party	District Minister for Colombo			
Abdul Rasak Mansoor		United National Party	District Minister for Mullaitivu	1978		
H. G. P. Nelson		United National Party	District Minister for Trincomalee	1978		
Ranganayaki Pathmanathan		United National Party	District Minister for Batticaloa			
Gamini Jayawickrama Perera		United National Party	District Minister for Kurunegala			
N. A. Seneviratne		United National Party	District Minister for Kegalle			
H. B. Wanninayake		United National Party	District Minister for Puttalam			
U. B. Wijekoon		United National Party	District Minister for Jaffna	1978		
