= Hector Fernando =

Ceylonese politician

Hon. Dr Hector Fernando

Member of the Ceylon Parliament for Negombo
- In office 1967–1976
- Preceded by: A. N. D. A. Abeysinghe
- Succeeded by: T. Quintin Fernando

Personal details
- Born: 30 September 1903 Katana
- Died: 21 October 1976 (aged 73) Colombo
- Party: Lanka Sama Samaja Party
- Spouse: Esme Mary Violet Fernando
- Children: Lalitha Weerakone Rohini De Mel Malini De Fonseka
- Education: St Joseph's College, Colombo, University of Edinburgh
- Profession: Physician, politician

Dr Hector Hieronymus Fernando (30 September 1903 - 21 October 1976) was a Ceylonese Marxist politician.

Hector Hieronymus Fernando was born 30 September 1903 in Katana. He went to school at St. Joseph's College, Colombo, travelling to the United Kingdom to study medicine at the University of Edinburgh. After qualifying as a physician he returned to Ceylon and established a private dispensary in Negombo, which evolved into a private nursing home and maternity clinic.

In 1937 he joined the Lanka Sama Samaja Party (LSSP), a Trotskyist political party. He subsequently ran, albeit unsuccessfully, for a seat on the Negombo Municipal Council at every available opportunity in numerous wards. It was only in 1962 that he was finally elected to the council.

Fernando contested the 2nd parliamentary election, held in May 1952 for the seat of Negombo, representing the LSSP. Fernando fell short of securing the seat by 13,325 votes, only securing 24% of the total vote.

He was successful in securing the seat at the 3rd parliamentary election held in April 1956, defeating the United National Party candidate, Quintin Fernando, by 2,680 votes (obtaining 47.5% of the total vote).

In 1959 the Delineation Commission divided the Negombo Electoral Division into two separate electorates and at the 4th parliamentary election, held on 19 March 1960, Fernando ran in the newly created seat of Katana, where he lost to Wijayapala Mendis, from the United National Party by 6,011 votes. He re-contested Katana at the subsequent parliamentary election in July 1960, falling short of securing the seat by 44 votes.

At the 6th parliamentary election, held in March 1965, he challenged Mendis for a third time in Katana and although there was a swing at the elections to the United National Party, Fernando losing out to Mendis again by 2,607 votes.

He was denied the LSSP nomination for Katana at the 1970 Ceylonese parliamentary election due to a deal between the Sri Lanka Freedom Party (SLFP) and the LSSP whereby the SLFP agreed not to run a candidate in the seat of Balapitiya (which was won by the LSSP candidate, Weerasinghe de Silva) in return for the LSSP not running a candidate in Katana (which was won by K. C. de Silva from the SLFP by 10,781 votes). Despite his disappointment in the party's decision he remained a member of the LSSP until his death on 21 October 1976. At the time of his death he was the chairman of the Negombo South Fisheries Co-operative, which at the time was the largest co-operative project in South East Asia.
