= D. D. Gunasekera =

Ceylonese businessman and politician

Daniel Dias Gunasekera was a Ceylonese businessman and politician.

Gunasekera was elected to the 2nd State Council of Ceylon representing Bandarawela on 22 February 1936, where he sat on the executive committee of health. In April 1943 the Bribery Commissioner found that Gunasekera, E. W. Abeygunasekera, Charles Batuwantudawe, E. R. Tambimuttu and H. A. Goonesekera had accepted bribes in the exercise of their duties as members of the Home Affairs Committee. On 25 May 1943 he resigned from the State Council. J. G. Rajakulendran won the subsequent by-election for the seat, held 11 October 1943.
