= Selvam Adaikalanathan =

Sri Lankan Tamil militant and politician

Hon. Selvam Adaikalanathan MP
- செல்வம் அடைக்கலநாதன் සෙල්වම් අඩෛක්කලනාදන්
- Adaikalanathan in August 2015

President of Tamil Eelam Liberation Organization
- Incumbent
- Assumed office 1986
- Preceded by: Sri Sabaratnam

Deputy chairman of committees of the Parliament of Sri Lanka
- In office 1 September 2015 – 2 March 2020
- Preceded by: Murugesu Chandrakumar
- Succeeded by: Angajan Ramanathan

Member of the Parliament of Sri Lanka
- Incumbent
- Assumed office 2000
- Constituency: Vanni District

Personal details
- Born: Amirthanathan Adaikalanathan; 10 June 1962 (age 64)
- Party: Tamil Eelam Liberation Organization
- Other political affiliations: Tamil National Alliance

Amirthanathan Adaikalanathan (Tamil: அமிர்தநாதன் அடைக்கலநாதன், romanized: Amirtanātaṉ Aṭaikkalanātaṉ; born 10 June 1962), commonly known as Selvam Adaikalanathan, is a Sri Lankan Tamil militant turned politician and Member of Parliament. He was the Deputy chairman of committees of the Parliament of Sri Lanka from September 2015 to March 2020. He is the leader of the Tamil Eelam Liberation Organization, a member of the Tamil National Alliance.

== Early life ==
Adaikalanathan was born 10 June 1962. He hails from Mannar in northern Sri Lanka. At the age of 15 he joined the Tamil Eelam Liberation Organization (TELO), a Tamil militant group fighting for an independent state of Tamil Eelam in northern and eastern Sri Lanka. He took on the nom de guerre Selvam'. Adaikalanathan took on the leadership/presidency of TELO following the killing of Sri Sabaratnam by the Liberation Tigers of Tamil Eelam on 5 May 1986.

== Political career ==
Adaikalanathan contested the 1989 parliamentary election as a ENDLF/EPRLF/TELO/TULF electoral alliance candidate in Vanni District but failed to get elected after coming 3rd amongst the alliance candidates. He contested the 2000 parliamentary election as one of the TELO's candidates in Vanni District and was elected to the Parliament of Sri Lanka.

On 20 October 2001 the All Ceylon Tamil Congress, Eelam People's Revolutionary Liberation Front, TELO and Tamil United Liberation Front formed the Tamil National Alliance (TNA). Adaikalanathan contested the 2001 parliamentary election as one of the TNA's candidates in Vanni District and was re-elected to Parliament. He was re-elected at the 2004, 2010 and 2015 parliamentary elections. He was elected Deputy chairman of committees of the Parliament of Sri Lanka when the new parliament met on 1 September 2015.

Adaikalanathan was re-elected at the 2020 parliamentary election.

== Electoral history ==
Electoral history of Selvam Adaikalanathan
Election	Constituency	Party	Alliance	Votes	Result
1989 parliamentary	Vanni District	Tamil Eelam Liberation Organization	ENDLF/EPRLF/TELO/TULF	5,771	Not elected
2000 parliamentary	Vanni District	Tamil Eelam Liberation Organization		15,490	Elected
2001 parliamentary	Vanni District	Tamil Eelam Liberation Organization	Tamil National Alliance	28,548	Elected
2004 parliamentary	Vanni District	Tamil Eelam Liberation Organization	Tamil National Alliance	39,535	Elected
2010 parliamentary	Vanni District	Tamil Eelam Liberation Organization	Tamil National Alliance	17,366	Elected
2015 parliamentary	Vanni District	Tamil Eelam Liberation Organization	Tamil National Alliance	26,397	Elected
2020 parliamentary	Vanni District	Tamil Eelam Liberation Organization	Tamil National Alliance	18,563	Elected
