= Denzil Fernando =

Sri Lankan politician (1923–2010)

Nicholas Denzil Fernando (24 March 1923 - 21 July 2010) was a Sri Lankan lawyer and politician. He was former Minister of Industries and Scientific Affairs and Member of Parliament.

Having studied at the Ceylon Law College, he took oaths as an proctor in 1952. He was elected to the Negombo Municipal Council in 1953. Having re-entered the Ceylon Law College he took oaths as an advocate in 1959. He became the Mayor of Negombo in 1960.

He contested the Negombo electorate from the United National Party in a by-election succeeding Quintin Fernando 1967. He retained his seat in the 1970 general elections and in the 1977 general elections. He was appointed Deputy Minister of Industries and Scientific Affairs in 1977 and was appointed Minister Industries and Scientific Affairs in 1984.
