= Hemali Weerasekara =

Deputy Chairperson of Committees of the Parliament of Sri Lanka since 2024

Hon. Hemali Weerasekara MP
- හේමාලි වීරසේකර ஹேமாலி வீரசேகர்

Deputy Chairperson of Committees
- Incumbent
- Assumed office 21 November 2024
- President: Anura Kumara Dissanayake
- Prime Minister: Harini Amarasuriya
- Speaker: Jagath Wickramaratne
- Preceded by: Angajan Ramanathan

Member of Parliament for Gampaha District
- Incumbent
- Assumed office 21 November 2024
- Majority: 66,737 preferential votes

Personal details
- Born: 1 March 1969 (age 57)
- Party: National People's Power

Hemali Weerasekara (born 1 March 1969) is a Sri Lankan politician currently serving as the Deputy Chairperson of Committees since 21 November 2024. She is the first woman to hold this office. A member of the National People's Power, She was elected to the parliament in the 2024 Sri Lankan parliamentary election representing the Gampaha Electoral District.
