= E. W. Abeygunasekera =

Member of the 1st and 2nd State Councils of Ceylon

Edwin Wilfred Abeygunasekera was a member of the 1st and 2nd State Councils of Ceylon.

Abeygunasekera was elected to the State Council of Ceylon on 20 June 1931, representing Nuwara Eliya as a member of the Labour Party, defeating James T. Rutnam by 3,136 votes and Leslie W. F. de Saram by 7,818 votes.

He was re-elected to the State Council in 1936 with 11,248 votes (57%), again defeating Rutnam, who was placed third. A Tamil of Indian origin, S. Ramaiah was the runner up in this election. Following the election Abeygunasekera was appointed as a member of the executive committee for Home Affairs. In April 1943 the Bribery Commissioner found that Abeygunasekera, Charles Batuwantudawe, D. D. Gunasekera, E. R. Tambimuttu and H. A. Goonesekera had accepted bribes in the exercise of their duties as members of the Home Affairs Committee. They all resigned their positions on the State Council, with the exceptions of Batuwantudawe who had died earlier and Tambimuttu who continued to sit on the council until he was formally expelled. His position on the State Council was filled by M. D. Banda, who won the subsequent by-election for Nuwara Eliya, held in October 1943.

Abeygunasekera was married to Leelawathi Kumarihami née Baddewela.
