= Parliamentary Bribery Commission =

The Parliamentary Bribery Commission (known as the Thalagodapitiya Commission ) was a commission of inquiry appointed by the Governor General of Ceylon, Sir Oliver Goonetilleke, by warrant dated 11 September 1959 to investigate and inquire into allegations of bribery and corruption among the ruling party members of parliament.

The Commission consisted of Walter Thalgodapitiya, District Judge as chairman; Thomas Webb Roberts, retired officer of the Ceylon Civil Service and Samuel John Charles Schokman, Advocate and former Crown Counsel. Appointed days before the Bandaranaike assassination, the commission tabled its report, titled The Reports of the Parliamentary Bribery Commission, 1959-1960, in the House of Representatives of Ceylon on 16 December 1960; it was published on 22 December 1960.

The report found evidence of bribery against two former ministers, C. A. S. Marikkar and M. P. de Zoysa, as well as parliamentarians D. B. Monnekulame, H. Abeywickrema, M. S. Kariapper and R. E. Jayatillake. Monnekulame and Kariapper resigned soon after the publication of the report. The Sirima Bandaranaike government at the time did not take any action based on the report. In 1965, the UNP-led new national government revisited the report and enacted the Imposition of Civic Disabilities (Special Provisions) Act (No. 14 of 1965), which stripped Marikkar, de Zoysa, Abeywickrema, Kariapper, Jayatilleke, and Monnekulame of their civic rights for a period of seven years. Kariapper, who was a member of parliament at the time, lost his seat as a consequence of the enactment.

== See also ==
- Commission to Enquire into Bribery in the State Council of Ceylon
- Lessons Learnt and Reconciliation Commission

== External list ==
- Commission To Investigate Allegations Of Bribery Or Corruption
- Examining Facets of Corruption in Sri Lanka
