= H. A. Goonesekera =

Ceylonese politician

Henry Abeywickrema Goonesekera was a Ceylonese politician, who was a member of the 2nd State Council of Ceylon.

Goonesekera was adopted as a child by the Mahawelatenne family and as they had no male heir was appointed Rate Mahatmaya for Balangoda, a position usually reserved for the Kandyan Radala.

On 25 February 1936 he was elected to the 2nd State Council of Ceylon, representing Balangoda. Goonesekera defeated the sitting member, Col. T. G. Jayewardene, polling 14,539 votes to the latter's 10,360. He was appointed to the Executive Committee for Home Affairs.

In April 1943, the Bribery Commissioner found that Goonesekera, E. W. Abeygunasekera, Charles Batuwantudawe, D. D. Gunasekera and E. R. Tambimuttu had accepted bribes in the exercise of their duties as members of the Executive Committee for Home Affairs. As a result Goonesekera resigned from the State Council on 25 May 1943. At the subsequent by-election held in October that year, Sir Francis Molamure was elected.
