= Nikaweratiya Electoral District =

Electoral district of Sri Lanka

Nikaweratiya electoral district was an electoral district of Sri Lanka between August 1947 and February 1989. The district was named after the town of Nikaweratiya in Kurunegala District, North Western Province. The 1978 Constitution of Sri Lanka introduced the proportional representation electoral system for electing members of Parliament. The existing 160 mainly single-member electoral districts were replaced with 22 multi-member electoral districts. Nikaweratiya electoral district was replaced by the Kurunegala multi-member electoral district at the 1989 general elections, the first under the proportional representation system.

== Members of Parliament ==
Key

Independent SLFP UNP

Election	Member	Party	Term
1947	Kavisena Herath	Ind.	1947-1952
1952	Kavisena Herath	Ind.	1952-1956
1956	Mudiyanse Tennakoon	SLFP	1956-1960
1960 (March)	Mudiyanse Tennakoon	SLFP	1960
1960 (July)	Mudiyanse Tennakoon	SLFP	1960-1963
1964 by-election	Kavisena Herath	UNP	1964-1965
1965	Mudiyanse Tennakoon	Ind.	1965-1970
1970	Mudiyanse Tennakoon	Ind.	1970-1977
1977	H. B. Wanninayake	UNP	1970-1989

== Elections ==
=== 1947 Parliamentary General Election ===
Results of the 1st parliamentary election held between 23 August 1947 and 20 September 1947:

Candidate	Party	Symbol	Votes	%
Kavisena Herath	Independent	Elephant	7,316	51.52
U. B. Wanninayake	United National Party	Key	6,734	47.42
Valid Votes			14,050	98.94
Rejected Votes			150	1.06
Total Polled			14,200	100.00
Registered Electors			29,808	
Turnout				47.64

=== 1952 Parliamentary General Election ===
Results of the 2nd parliamentary election held between 24 May 1952 and 30 May 1952:

Candidate	Party	Symbol	Votes	%
Kavisena Herath	Independent	Elephant	11,999	62.75
Ratnayake Halbe Mudiyanselage		Star	6,993	36.57
Valid Votes			18,992	99.33
Rejected Votes			129	0.67
Total Polled			19,121	100.00
Registered Electors			34,969	
Turnout				54.68

=== 1956 Parliamentary General Election ===
Results of the 3rd parliamentary election held between 5 April 1956 and 10 April 1956:

Candidate	Party	Symbol	Votes	%
Mudiyanse Tennakoon	Sri Lanka Freedom Party	Hand	15,914	64.39
Kavisena Herath	United National Party	Elephant	7,829	31.68
S. Jinendradasa		Lamp	781	3.16
Valid Votes			24,524	99.23
Rejected Votes			190	0.77
Total Polled			24,714	100.00
Registered Electors			42,800	
Turnout				57.74

=== 1960 (March) Parliamentary General Election ===
Results of the 4th parliamentary election held on 19 March 1960:

Candidate	Party	Symbol	Votes	%
Mudiyanse Tennakoon	Sri Lanka Freedom Party	Hand	13,409	57.80
Kavisena Herath	United National Party	Elephant	8,381	36.13
T. M. R. M. Tennekoon		Cartwheel	765	3.30
D. M. T. G. W. Naranpanawa		Umbrella	469	2.02
Valid Votes			23,024	99.24
Rejected Votes			176	0.76
Total Polled			23,200	100.00
Registered Electors			32,356	
Turnout				71.70

=== 1960 (July) Parliamentary General Election ===
Results of the 5th parliamentary election held on 20 July 1960:

Candidate	Party	Symbol	Votes	%
Mudiyanse Tennakoon	Sri Lanka Freedom Party	Hand	13,478	57.02
Kavisena Herath	United National Party	Elephant	9,881	41.80
Valid Votes			23,359	98.82
Rejected Votes			278	1.18
Total Polled			23,637	100.00
Registered Electors			32,356	
Turnout				73.05

=== 1964 Parliamentary By-Election ===
Results of the 1964 parliamentary by-election, held on 1 April 1964:

Candidate	Party	Symbol	Votes	%
Kavisena Herath	United National Party	Elephant	13,915	41.42
Mudiyanse Tennakoon	Independent	Star	10,675	31.77
R. B. Tennakoon	Sri Lanka Freedom Party	Hand	8,635	25.70
W. F. C.Weerasooriya		Sun	246	0.73
Valid Votes			33,471	99.63
Rejected Votes			125	0.37
Total Polled			33,596	100.00
Registered Electors			42,764	
Turnout				78.56

=== 1965 Parliamentary General Election ===
Results of the 6th parliamentary election held on 22 March 1965:

Candidate	Party	Symbol	Votes	%
Mudiyanse Tennakoon	Independent	Flower	17,456	50.12
Kavisena Herath	United National Party	Elephant	16,098	46.22
R. B. Tennakoon		Pair of Scales	623	1.79
M. B. Wadigamangawa		Cartwheel	526	1.51
Valid Votes			34,703	99.64
Rejected Votes			124	0.36
Total Polled			34,827	100.00
Registered Electors			42,764	
Turnout				81.44

=== 1970 Parliamentary General Election ===
Results of the 7th parliamentary election held on 27 May 1970:

Candidate	Party	Symbol	Votes	%
Mudiyanse Tennakoon	Independent	Flower	24,163	52.68
H. B. Wanninayake	United National Party	Elephant	17,891	39.00
D. R. M. Panditha Koralage		Chair	1,633	3.56
K. D. Albert		Lamp	755	1.65
Kavisena Herath		Umbrella	682	1.49
O. N. Wanduragala		Butterfly	612	1.33
Valid Votes			45,736	99.71
Rejected Votes			134	0.29
Total Polled			45,870	100.00
Registered Electors			54,634	
Turnout				83.96

=== 1977 Parliamentary General Election ===
Results of the 8th parliamentary election held on 21 July 1977:

Candidate	Party	Symbol	Votes	%
H. B. Wanninayake	United National Party	Elephant	20,127	58.15
C. P. Tennakoon	Sri Lanka Freedom Party	Hand	12,223	35.31
Mudiyanse Tennakoon	Independent	Flower	2,124	6.14
Valid Votes			34,474	99.60
Rejected Votes			138	0.40
Total Polled			34,612	100.00
Registered Electors			39,021	
Turnout				88.70
