= U. B. Wanninayake =

Ceylonese politician (1905–1973)

Ukku Banda Wanninayake (23 November 1905 – 21 August 1973) was a Ceylonese politician. He served as Minister of Finance from 1965 to 1970.

Ukku Banda Wanninayake was born in Kurunegala on 23 November 1905 and was educated at S. Thomas' College, Mount Lavinia. He became a teacher and served as the principal of Maliyadeva College, Kurunegala from 1930 until 1947.

Wanninayake was elected to the 2nd State Council of Ceylon in 1943 at the by-election for the seat of Puttalam, following the death of the sitting member, John Herbert Ilangantileke. At the 1st parliamentary elections in 1947 he contested the seat of Nikaweratiya, representing the United National Party, losing to Kavisena Herath, who ran as an independent, by 582 votes.

In 1955 Wanninayake was elected as a member of the Senate of Ceylon and served as parliamentary secretary to the Minister of Finance from 1954 to 1956.

At the 4th parliamentary election held on 19 March 1960, he contested the newly created seat of Yapahuwa Electoral District, representing the Sri Lanka Freedom Party. Wanninayake received 6,961 votes and the United National Party candidate, R. B. Tennekoon, received 8,536 votes. At the subsequent the parliamentary election, held on 20 July 1960, he was successful in defeating R. B. Tennekoon, by a margin of only 612 votes (9,420 votes to 8,808 votes).

He retained the seat at the 6th parliamentary election, held on 22 March 1965, defeating the United National Party candidate, Tissa R. Balalla, 13,079 votes to 11,882 votes. He served as the Minister of Finance between 27 March 1965 and 25 March 1970 in the Third Dudley Senanayake cabinet.

He died in Colombo on 21 August 1973.
