= Oswald Boyd Forbes =

Ceylonese teabroker, military officer, and politician

- Born: August 10, 1887; Bishop's House, Colpetty, Colonial Ceylon
- Died: March 26, 1960 (aged 72)
- Education: Haileybury and Imperial Service College
- Occupations: Tea-broker, military officer, politician
- Employer(s): Forbes and Walker Ltd
- Spouse: Gladys Irene née Copland Mackie (m. 1919)
- Parents: James Forbes; Caroline née Delmege
- Relatives: Charles Morton Forbes (brother)
- Awards: Commander of the Order of the British Empire (CBE)

Colonel Oswald Boyd Forbes CBE ED (10 August 1887 – 26 March 1960) was a tea-broker, military officer and politician in Colonial Ceylon.

== Early life and education ==
Oswald Boyd Forbes was born 10 August 1887 at Bishop's House, Colpetty, the third son of James Forbes (1851 - 1939) and Caroline née Delmege. His older brother, Charles Morton, was a Royal Navy officer, achieving the rank of Admiral of the Fleet in 1940. Oswald received his education at Haileybury College between 1901 and 1906.

== Career ==
In 1909 he joined his father's firm, Forbes and Walker Ltd (a merchant brokerage house), after business training in an accountants' office and in the Hong Kong Bank in London. Forbes was a member of the Ceylon Chamber of Commerce and served as its president in 1948. In 1923 he was made a partner in Forbes and Walker remaining with the company until his retirement as senior partner in 1946.

Forbes served as the inaugural Secretary of the Ceylon Cricket Association following its formation in 1922, later serving as the Association's president in 1928.

In 1957 he was appointed as a member of the Parliament of Ceylon, replacing Reginald Percy Gaddum.

== Military service ==
He was a member of the Ceylon Defence Force and served as the commanding officer of the Ceylon Garrison Artillery. In 1937 Forbes attended the Coronation of King George VI, as one of the official representatives of the Ceylon Defence Force, for which he received the Coronation Medal.

== Family ==
Forbes married Gladys Irene née Copland Mackie on 19 November 1919 at the Church of St. John the Evangelist, Edinburgh.

== Honours ==
He was appointed Commander of the British Empire in 1941.
