= A. N. D. A. Abeysinghe =

Ceylonese politician (1894–1963)

Alexander Nicholas de Abrew Abeysinge CBE, UM, JP (1 May 1894 - 15 September 1963) was a Ceylonese politician.

== Early life and education ==
Alexander Nicholas de Abrew Abeysinge was born in Kosgoda on 1 May 1894, the son of Mudaliyar Alexander de Abrew Abeysinge and Louisa. He was educated at St. Thomas College, Colombo.

== Political career ==
In July 1949 he was elected to the Negombo Municipal Council in the Kundnnnawila Ward following a by-election, as a result of the resignation of the sitting member, C. M. Fernando. In January 1950 he was elected as the first mayor of Negombo Municipal Council.

At the 2nd parliamentary elections held between 24 May 1952 and 30 May 1952 he successfully contested the seat of Negombo. He polled 22,721 (57.42% of the total vote) and 13,325 votes clear of his nearest rival.

== Honours ==
He was ex officio Unofficial magistrate and Justice of the peace during his tenure as mayor of Negombo. He was appointed member of the Order of the British Empire (MBE) in the 1949 Birthday Honours for services to the co-operative movement and was appointed Commander of the Order of the British Empire (CBE) in the 1954 Birthday Honours.

== Family life ==
He married Leila Mildred née Rajapakse, daughter of Gate Mudaliyar Alexander Edmund De Silva Wijegooneratne Samaraweera Rajapakse, OBE. He died on 15 September 1963. His son was Brigadier A. E. R. Abeyesinghe, KSV former Deputy Commandant of the Volunteer Force.
