= C. E. P. de Silva =

Ceylonese lawyer and politician

Charles Edward Perry de Silva was a Ceylonese lawyer and politician.

Following the death of the sitting State Council of Ceylon member for Negombo, Gate Mudaliyar A. E. Rajapakse, on 20 September 1937, de Silva was elected to the State Council at the subsequent by-election on 15 January 1938. De Silva died whilst still in office on 27 February 1942. He was replaced by Hector de Zoysa Siriwardena.
