= S. M. Anantham =

Sri Lankan politician

Honourable S. M. Anantham MSC

Member of the State Council of Ceylon
- In office 1931–1935
- Succeeded by: R. Sri Pathmanathan
- Constituency: Mannar-Mullaitivu

Personal details
- Party: Independent
- Occupation: Lawyer
- Ethnicity: Ceylon Tamil

Seemanpillai Mudaliar Anantham was a Ceylon Tamil proctor, politician and member of the State Council of Ceylon.

Anantham was an unofficial magistrate. He contested the 1931 State Council election as an independent candidate in Mannar-Mullaitivu and was elected to the State Council of Ceylon.
