= A. E. Rajapakse =

Ceylonese politician and headman

Gate Mudaliyar Alexander Edmund de Silva Wijegooneratne Samaraweera Rajapakse OBE (13 March 1866 – 20 September 1937) was a Ceylonese colonial-era politician and headman.

He was born on 13 March 1866 in Negombo, the eldest son of Mudliyar John de Silva Wijegooneratne Rajapakshe, a member of the Salagama caste and Magdalene Mendis née Abeysekara. The family owned and operated a number of cinnamon estates in the Negombo District.

In 1922 he was elected as the first chairman of the Negombo Urban Council, a position he retained until 1923 and then from 1925 to 22 August 1934. In 1932 he was elected as the inaugural chair of the Association of Urban Councils of Ceylon. Rajapakse also served on the Board of Agriculture.

He was elected to the 1st State Council of Ceylon on 17 June 1931 for Negombo representing the Union Party. He was subsequently re-elected to the 2nd State Council in 1936, with a 9,000 vote majority, where he served on the Executive Committee for Agriculture and Lands. Dying in office on 20 September 1937.

Rajapaske's daughter, Leila Mildred, married Alexander Nicholas De Abrew Abeysinghe, the first Mayor of the Negombo Municipal Council (1950) and the MP for Negombo (1952–56).
