= Howard Frank Parfitt =

British tea planter, businessman and politician

Howard Frank Parfitt (1888–1957) was a British tea planter, businessman and politician in colonial Ceylon.

Howard Frank Parfitt was born in 1888 in Essex, the son of Frank Chapman Parfitt and Alice.

Parfitt arrived in Ceylon in 1910 and by 1919 was appointed as a Director of Mackwoods Limited, a major Ceylonese tea producer.

On 7 January 1926 Parfitt served as an inaugural board member of the Tea Research Institute of Ceylon.

Parfitt was appointed as a nominated member of the 2nd State Council of Ceylon on 2 March 1936, where he served on the executive committee for home affairs. He resigned from the State Council on 18 May 1943.

He died in 1957, at the age of 69, in Surrey, England.
