= Shelagh Gaddum Cotton =

Sri Lankan athlete

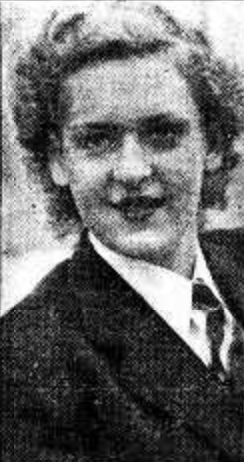
- Shelagh Gaddum in 1950, from an Australian newspaper.
- Born: Shelagh Ann Gaddum; 1928
- Occupation: Athlete
- Parent: R. P. Gaddum

Shelagh Gaddum Cotton (1928 – before 2013) was an athlete from Sri Lanka. She represented Ceylon in five sports — hockey, swimming, cricket, tennis, and golf — in international competition.

== Early life ==
Shelagh Ann Gaddum was born in Ceylon, one of the five daughters of R. P. Gaddum and Doreen Eleanor Burmester Gaddum. Her parents were both born in Ceylon to English parents. Her father was a businessman and politician; he was also athletic, as a tennis player and cricketer.

== Career ==
In 1940, Gaddum was a very young member of the All-Ceylon women's hockey team, when they played India. Further international team play was restricted by World War II. In the 1940s, an English women's cricket team visited Colombo, and she was on the Ceylon team assembled to play a game with them. She trained as a swimmer in Australia with coach Harry Nightingale, and represented Ceylon as a swimmer at the Empire Games in New Zealand in 1950; she was the team's only woman member, and its only English member. In tennis, she held titles in women's doubles and women's singles events, and played against American stars including Althea Gibson, Gussie Moran, and Doris Hart. She was a member of the Royal Colombo Golf Club, played against the Indian women's team, and won the Ceylon title four years in a row, from 1966 to 1969, and again in 1975.

== Personal life ==
Shelagh Gaddum married Richard Cotton in 1952. They had two sons. The Cottons retired to England in 2004. She was listed as "the late Shelagh Cotton" in her sister Moyra's obituary in 2012.
