= Clement Johnston Black =

Scottish chartered accountant

Clement Johnston Black (7 May 1888 - 18 December 1967) was a Chartered Accountant and a member of the 1st and 2nd State Councils of Ceylon.

Clement Johnston Black was born on 7 May 1888 in Midbothian, Scotland. He was educated in Glasgow and travelled to Ceylon in 1913. He was employed as an Accountant at Walker, Sons & Company Limited and as a Company Director on a number of firms including, Colombo Stores Ltd, Ceylon Printers Ltd, Ceylon Theatres Ltd, Ceylon Hotels Ltd, and Nuwara Eliya Hotels Company Ltd.

Black was appointed to the 1st State Council of Ceylon on 25 March 1935 and was re-appointed to the 2nd State Council in 1936, where he served on the Executive Committee of Home Affairs.

He served as one of the first Company Directors of the Bank of Ceylon, from its initial establishment in 1939 until 1942, when he was replaced by E. P. A. Fernando.

Black married Mildred Beryl née Buckman, with whom he had four children; one son and three daughters.

Black died on 18 December 1967 in Saint Saviour, Jersey.
