= Mudiyanse Tennakoon =

Ceylonese politician (1934–1991)

Hon. Mudiyanse Tennakoon

Member of the Ceylon Parliament for Nikaweratiya
- In office 1956–1963
- Preceded by: Kavisena Herath
- Succeeded by: Kavisena Herath
- In office 1965–1977
- Preceded by: Kavisena Herath
- Succeeded by: H. B. Wanninayake

Personal details
- Born: 16 June 1934 Nikaweratiya, Sri Lanka
- Died: 11 December 1991 (aged 57) Nikaweratiya, Sri Lanka
- Party: Sri Lanka Freedom Party
- Children: Soma Kumari (daughter), Kumudu (daughter), Sunethra Kumari/Dammi (daughter)
- Education: S. Thomas' College, Gurutalawa
- Occupation: politician

Mudiyanse Tennakoon (16 June 1934 - 11 December 1991) was a Ceylonese politician, colloquially known as Podi Putha (youngest son).

He received his primary education at Maho Central School and his secondary education at S. Thomas' College, Gurutalawa After completing his school education he worked on the Yarrow Tea Estate in Pupuressa.

He was first elected to parliament at the 3rd parliamentary election in April 1956, representing the Sri Lanka Freedom Party in the Nikaweratiya electorate, defeating the sitting United National Party member Kavisena Herath, 15,914 votes to 7,829, becoming, at the age of 22, the youngest parliamentarian in Ceylon.

At the subsequent 4th parliamentary election and 5th parliamentary elections held in March and July 1960, he was re-elected by 5,028 and 3,597 vote margins respectively over rival Herath. Tennakoon was appointed the Parliamentary Secretary to the Minister for Agriculture, Land, Irrigation and Power in the First Sirimavo Bandaranaike cabinet, and in May 1963 he was appointed the Parliamentary Secretary to the Minister of Finance.

In December 1963 Tennakoon was expelled from the Sri Lanka Freedom Party and resigned his position in parliament in protest. At the 1964 parliamentary by-election, held on 1 April 1964, Tennakoon contested the seat as an independent, but lost to Herath, who secured 13,915 votes to Tennakoon's 10,675. He did however finish ahead of the SLFP candidate, R. B. Tennakoon, by 2,040 votes.

At the 6th parliamentary election held on 22 March 1965, he ran as an independent, successfully regaining the seat of Nikaweratiya, by a 1,358 vote margin over Herath.

Tennakoon retained the seat at the 7th parliamentary election, held on 27 May 1970, again as an independent, with 52.7% of the total vote, defeating the UNP candidate, H. B. Wanninayake by 6,272 votes.

At the 8th parliamentary election held on 21 July 1977, he lost the seat, with H. B. Wanninayake securing 20,127 votes (58% of the total votes), C. P. Tennakoon, the SLFP candidate, securing 12,223 (35% of the total vote) to Tennakoon's 2,124 votes (6% of the total vote).

His daughter, Soma Kumari, also served as a member of parliament, between 2001 and 2004.
