= Quintin Fernando =

Sri Lankan lawyer and politician (1896–1967)

Thomas Quentin Fernando (17 November 1896 - 1967) was a Ceylonese lawyer and politician. He was a Deputy Chairman of Committees and Member of Parliament from 1960 to 1967.

A proctor from the Negombo, he was a long-standing member of the Negombo Law Society. He contested the Negombo electorate from the United National Party in the 1956 general elections, but was defeated by Hector Fernando. He again contested the March 1960 general elections and was elected to the House of Representatives. He was re-elected in the 1960 July general elections and the 1970 general elections. He served as Deputy Chairman of Committees from 5 April 1965 until his death in office on 22 April 1967.
