= Ranganayaki Pathmanathan =

Sri Lankan politician

Hon. Ranganayaki Pathmanathan

Member of Parliament for Pottuvil

Personal details
- Party: United National Party

Ranganayaki Pathmanathan was a Sri Lankan politician. She was a member of the Parliament of Sri Lanka. She was the nominated member for Pottuvil, replacing M. Canagaratnam.
