= Evelyn Charles Villiers =

British planter, politician (1884–1968)

Evelyn Charles Arthur Villiers JP UPM (16 July 1884 - 27 October 1968) was a British planter and politician in colonial Ceylon.

Evelyn Charles Arthur Villiers was born 16 July 1884, the fourth (and youngest son) of seven children to Frederick Ernest Villiers (1840-1922) and Jane Isabella née Baird.

Villiers married Dorothy Katherine née Moore-Lane (1884-1976) on 17 July 1907, they had three children: Robert Alexander (b. 1908), Marjorie Frances (b. 1909) and Kenneth Charles Howard (b. 1912).

In 1909, at the age of twenty-five, he moved to Ceylon and worked on several tea plantations. In 1924 he became the manager of the Hemingford Group, a major tea company based in the Kelani Valley.

He was one of eight members appointed by Governor Sir Graeme Thomson to the 1st State Council of Ceylon in July 1931, where he served on the Executive Committee for Communication and Works.

Villiers was subsequently appointed as one of the nominated European members of the 2nd State Council of Ceylon on 12 March 1936. He resigned from the State Council on 30 April 1938 and was replaced by Reginald Percy Gaddum. On 14 February 1939 he was re-appointed as a member of the State Council, replacing Gaddum who resigned from the State Council in January that year. He resigned from the State Council a second time on 7 April 1947.

Villiers served on the Planter's Association of Ceylon, including a term as chairman (1928-29), and was the Association's representative on the State Council.

He died on 27 October 1968 at age 84.
