= Yapahuwa Electoral District =

Electoral district in Sri Lanka

Yapahuwa electoral district was an electoral district of Sri Lanka between March 1960 and February 1989. The district was named after the town of Yapahuwa in Kurunegala District, North Western Province. The 1978 Constitution of Sri Lanka introduced the proportional representation electoral system for electing members of Parliament. The existing 160 mainly single-member electoral districts were replaced with 22 multi-member electoral districts. Yapahuwa electoral district was replaced by the Kurunegala multi-member electoral district at the 1989 general elections.

== Members of Parliament ==
Key

Independent SLFP UNP

| Election | Member | Party | Term |
|---|---|---|---|
| 1960 (March) | R. B. Tennekoon | Sri Lanka Freedom Party | 1960 |
| 1960 (July) | U. B. Wanninayake | United National Party | 1960-1965 |
| 1965 | U. B. Wanninayake | United National Party | 1965-1970 |
| 1970 | Tissa R. Balalla | Sri Lanka Freedom Party | 1970-1977 |
| 1977 | H. B. Abeyratne | United National Party | 1977-1989 |

== Elections ==
=== 1960 (March) Parliamentary General Election ===
| Candidate | Party | Symbol | Votes | % |
|---|---|---|---|---|
| R. B. Tennekoon | Sri Lanka Freedom Party | Hand | 8,536 | 51.95 |
| U. B. Wanninayake | United National Party | Elephant | 6,961 | 42.37 |
| N. W. Abeywardena | | Umbrella | 792 | 4.82 |
| Valid Votes | | | 16,289 | 99.14 |
| Rejected Votes | | | 141 | 0.86 |
| Total Polled | | | 16,430 | 100.00 |
| Registered Electors | | | 24,393 | |
| Turnout | | | | 67.36 |

=== 1960 (July) Parliamentary General Election ===
| Candidate | Party | Symbol | Votes | % |
|---|---|---|---|---|
| U. B. Wanninayake | United National Party | Elephant | 9,420 | 51.28 |
| R. B. Tennekoon | Sri Lanka Freedom Party | Hand | 8,808 | 47.95 |
| Valid Votes | | | 18,228 | 99.23 |
| Rejected Votes | | | 141 | 0.77 |
| Total Polled | | | 18,369 | 100.00 |
| Registered Electors | | | 24,393 | |
| Turnout | | | | 75.30 |

=== 1965 Parliamentary General Election ===
| Candidate | Party | Symbol | Votes | % |
|---|---|---|---|---|
| U. B. Wanninayake | United National Party | Elephant | 13,079 | 49.29 |
| Tissa R. Balalla | Sri Lanka Freedom Party | Hand | 11,882 | 44.78 |
| N. W. Abeywardena | | Scales | 12,444 | 46.89 |
| H. B. Kelegama | | Cartwheel | 183 | 0.69 |
| Valid Votes | | | 26,388 | 99.44 |
| Rejected Votes | | | 148 | 0.56 |
| Total Polled | | | 26,536 | 100.00 |
| Registered Electors | | | | 31,596 |
| Turnout | | | 83.99 | |

=== 1970 Parliamentary General Election ===
| Candidate | Party | Symbol | Votes | % |
|---|---|---|---|---|
| Tissa R. Balalla | Sri Lanka Freedom Party | Hand | 20,179 | 54.68 |
| U. B. Wanninayake | United National Party | Elephant | 16,248 | 44.03 |
| H. M. P. K. B. Herath | | Bell | 359 | 0.97 |
| Valid Votes | | | 36,786 | 99.68 |
| Rejected Votes | | | 117 | 0.32 |
| Total Polled | | | 36,903 | 100.00 |
| Registered Electors | | | 42,171 | |
| Turnout | | | | 87.51 |

=== 1977 Parliamentary General Election ===
| Candidate | Party | Symbol | Votes | % |
|---|---|---|---|---|
| H. B. Abeyratne | United National Party | Elephant | 22,189 | 57.31 |
| T. B. Ekanayake | | Key | 16,379 | 42.30 |
| Valid Votes | | | 38,568 | 99.62 |
| Rejected Votes | | | 149 | 0.67 |
| Total Polled | | | 38,717 | 100.00 |
| Registered Electors | | | 43,638 | |
| Turnout | | | | 88.72 |
