= R. S. Tennekoon =

Sri Lankan politician

Roland Stephen Tennekoon was an elected member of both the 1st and 2nd State Councils of Ceylon.

Roland Stephen Tennekoon attended Trinity College, Kandy, where in 1904 he was awarded Ryde Gold Medal, as the "best all-round boy" at the school.

Tennekoon, a proctor, was elected to the State Council on 20 June 1931, representing Katugampola as a member of the Labour Party.

On 3 March 1936, following his successful re-election to the State Council he was elected as Deputy Chairman of Committees.

Tennekoon was married to Tissy (who served as chairperson of Kuliyapitiya Town Council) and had two children, a son - Roland Jr. and a daughter - Kuma.
