= Laurel Casinader =

Sri Lankan educationalist and philanthropist

Laurel Casinader (née Tambimuttu; 1903–1986) was a Sri Lankan educationalist and philanthropist. She is considered the first female university graduate in Sri Lanka.

== Biography ==
Casinader's father was lawyer and politician E. R. Tambimuttu.

In 1949, Casinader and Lady Evelyn de Soysa co-founded the Sri Lankan Women's Association in the United Kingdom.The Association was created to assist the first generation of Sri Lankan women who came to the United Kingdom to meet each other, and build social bonds. In 1976, Casinader established an education scheme within the Sri Lankan Women's Association, to support financially disadvantaged girls and young women in Sri Lanka with their education. Casinader was also involved with the Westminster branch of the International Alliance of Women.

Casinader's husband was an engineer in the Public Works Department.
