= Charles Forbes (Royal Navy officer) =

Royal Navy admiral (1880–1960)

Admiral of the Fleet Sir Charles Forbes GCB DSO
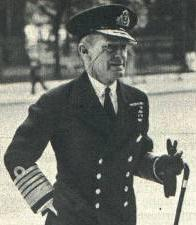
- Admiral of the Fleet Sir Charles Forbes
- Born: 22 November 1880; Colombo, Ceylon
- Died: 28 August 1960 (aged 79); Queen Alexandra Military Hospital, London
- Military career
- Allegiance: United Kingdom
- Branch: Royal Navy
- Service years: 1894–1943
- Rank: Admiral of the Fleet
- Commands: Plymouth Command; Home Fleet; 1st Battle Squadron; HMS Iron Duke; HMS Queen Elizabeth; HMS Galatea
- Conflicts: First World War: Gallipoli campaign; Battle of Jutland; Second World War: Norwegian campaign
- Awards: Knight Grand Cross of the Order of the Bath; Distinguished Service Order; Order of Saint Stanislaus, 2nd Class with Swords (Russia); Legion of Honour (France)

Admiral of the Fleet Sir Charles Morton Forbes (22 November 1880 – 28 August 1960) was a Royal Navy officer. He served in the First World War, seeing action in the Dardanelles campaign and at the Battle of Jutland. As captain of a cruiser, he was present at the surrender of the German fleet. During the Second World War, he served as Commander-in-Chief, Home Fleet: his fleet suffered heavy losses including the aircraft carrier HMS Glorious and nine destroyers during the Norwegian campaign in Spring 1940. He went on to be Commander-in-Chief, Plymouth in May 1941 and in that capacity organised the defence of Plymouth from air attack, prosecuted attacks on enemy shipping using the harbour at Brest as well as other ports along the French coast, and also initiated the St Nazaire Raid in March 1942 before retiring in August 1943.

== Naval career ==
=== Early career ===
Born in Ceylon, to James Forbes and Caroline Forbes (née Delmege). His father was a tea-broker, founder of the merchant brokerage house Forbes and Walker Ltd. Charles Forbes was educated at Dollar Academy and Eastman's Royal Naval Academy. He joined the training ship HMS Britannia as a cadet on 15 July 1894. He was promoted to midshipman on 15 July 1896 and posted to the battleship HMS Magnificent in the Channel Fleet in September 1896 and to the armoured cruiser HMS Imperieuse on the Pacific Station in January 1898. Promoted to acting sub-lieutenant on 15 January 1900, he returned to the United Kingdom for his promotion courses. Promoted to lieutenant on 15 January 1901, he was appointed to the battleship HMS Royal Oak in the Mediterranean Fleet.

In early April 1902 Forbes transferred to the armoured cruiser HMS Aboukir, also serving in the Mediterranean Fleet. After attending the gunnery school HMS Excellent in 1903, he was assigned to Directing Staff at the gunnery school HMS Cambridge in June 1904. He then became gunnery officer in the armoured cruiser HMS Carnarvon in the Mediterranean Fleet in May 1905 and gunnery officer in the battleship HMS Dominion in the Channel Fleet in May 1908. After joining the staff of the Inspectorate of Target Practice in October 1910, he became gunnery officer in the battleship HMS Superb in the Home Fleet in February 1911 and then, having been promoted to commander on 31 December 1912, he returned to the gunnery school HMS Excellent in early 1913.

=== First World War ===
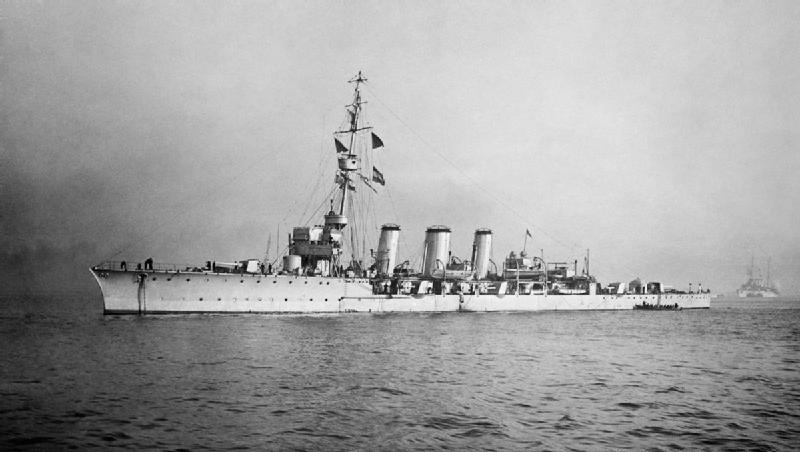
The cruiser, HMS Galatea, commanded by Charles Forbes during the First World War

Forbes served in the First World War as Executive Officer in the battleship HMS Queen Elizabeth in the Mediterranean Fleet from November 1914 and saw action in the Dardanelles campaign in April 1915. He became Flag Commander to Admiral Sir John Jellicoe, Commander-in-Chief of the Grand Fleet, in the battleship HMS Iron Duke in October 1915 and saw action at the Battle of Jutland in May 1916 for which he was awarded the Distinguished Service Order on 15 September 1916. He moved on to become Flag Commander to Admiral Sir Charles Madden, Second-in-Command of the Grand Fleet, in the battleship HMS Revenge in February 1917. He was awarded the Order of Saint Stanislaus, 2nd Class with Swords for his action during the Battle of Jutland on 5 June 1917. Promoted to captain on 30 June 1917, he was given command of the cruiser HMS Galatea in the Grand Fleet in July 1917 and was present at the surrender of the German fleet in November 1918.

=== Inter-war years ===
After the end of the war, Forbes served as Naval Member of the Ordnance Committee from October 1919 and then, after attending the Senior Officers' course at the Royal Naval War College, he served as Deputy Director of the Royal Navy Staff College from August 1921. He became Flag Captain to the Commander-in-Chief of the Atlantic Fleet in the battleship HMS Queen Elizabeth in June 1923, Flag Captain to the Flag Officer Commanding the 3rd Battle Squadron in the battleship HMS Iron Duke in October 1924 and Director of Naval Ordnance at the Admiralty in June 1925. He was appointed a naval aide-de-camp to the King on 12 April 1928. Promoted to rear admiral on 5 October 1928 and appointed a Companion of the Order of the Bath on 3 June 1929, he became Rear Admiral commanding the Destroyer Flotillas in the Mediterranean Fleet with his flag in the cruiser HMS Coventry in August 1930 and Third Sea Lord and Controller of the Navy in March 1932. Promoted to vice admiral on 21 January 1933, he became Vice Admiral commanding 1st Battle Squadron and Second in Command of the Mediterranean Fleet with his flag in the battleship HMS Revenge in April 1934. Advanced to Knight Commander of the Order of the Bath on 3 June 1935, he re-deployed his fleet from Malta to Alexandria to avoid attack by the Italian Navy at the start of the Second Italo-Ethiopian War in October 1935. Promoted to full admiral on 19 August 1936, he became Commander-in-Chief, Home Fleet with his flag in the battleship HMS Nelson in April 1938.

=== Second World War ===
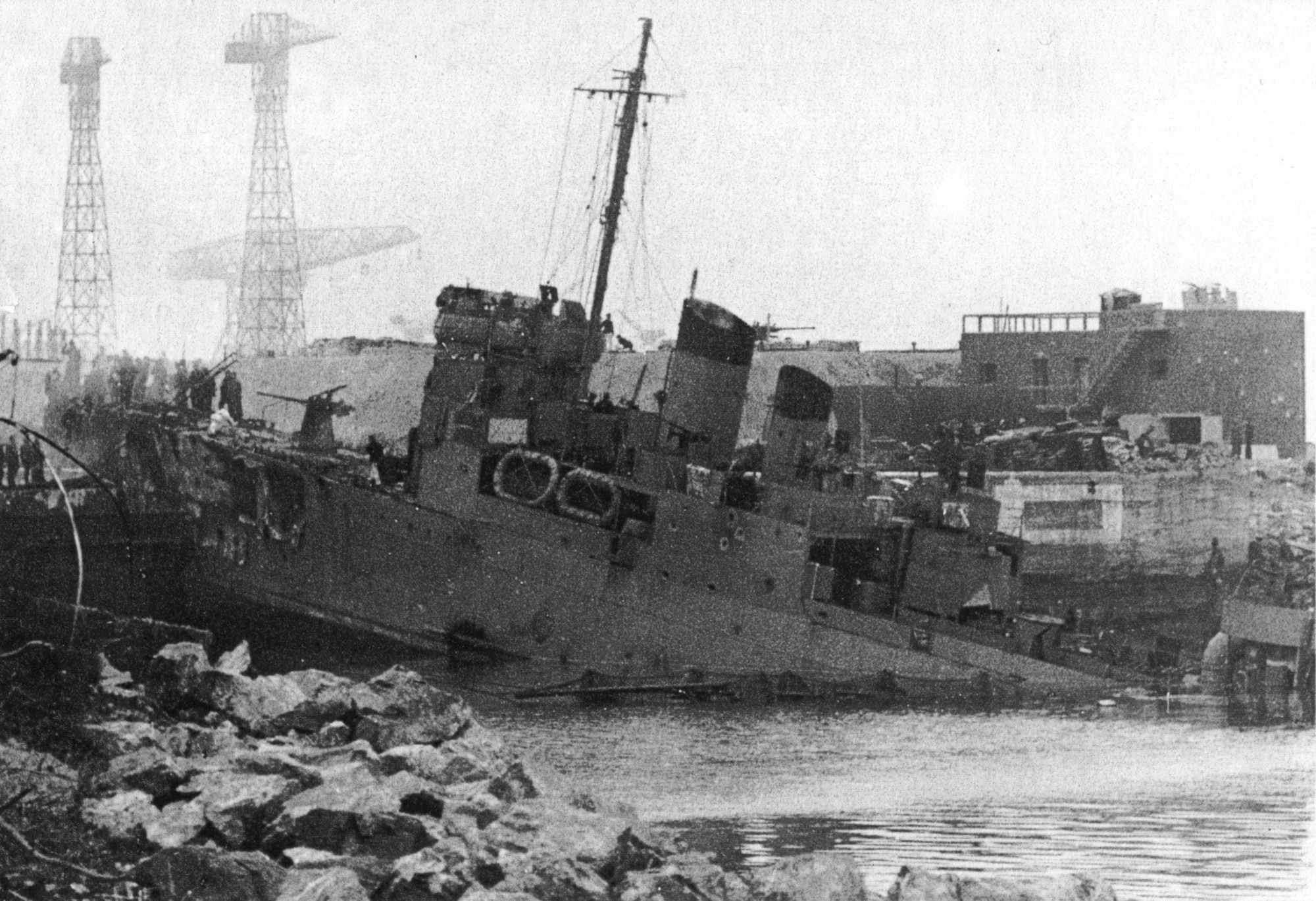
The destroyer HMS Campbeltown wedged in the dock gates during the St Nazaire Raid

Forbes served in the Second World War as Commander-in-Chief, Home Fleet, in which role he transferred his flag to the battleship HMS Rodney in December 1939. His fleet suffered heavy losses including the aircraft carrier HMS Glorious and nine destroyers during the Norwegian campaign in Spring 1940. He was on board Rodney when she came under air attack and was hit by a 500 kg (1,103 lb) bomb that pierced the armoured deck on 9 April 1940. Promoted to Admiral of the Fleet on 8 May 1940 and advanced to Knight Grand Cross of the Order of the Bath on 11 July 1940, he became Commander-in-Chief, Plymouth in May 1941. In that capacity he organised the defence of Plymouth from air attack, prosecuted attacks on enemy shipping using the harbour at Brest as well as other ports along the French coast, and also initiated the St Nazaire Raid in March 1942.

== Retirement ==
After retiring on 24 August 1943, Forbes pursued his interests in golf and lived at Cawsand Place at Wentworth in Surrey. He attended the funeral of King George VI in February 1952 and the coronation of Queen Elizabeth II in June 1953. He died at the Queen Alexandra Military Hospital in London on 28 August 1960.

== Family ==
In 1909 Forbes married Agnes Millicent Ewen; they had a son and a daughter. Following the death of his first wife, he married Marie Louise Berndtson in 1921. They had one daughter; the opera critic, journalist, author, and musicologist Elizabeth Forbes. His younger brother was Colonel Oswald Boyd Forbes.

== Sources ==
- Heathcote, Tony (2002). The British Admirals of the Fleet 1734 – 1995. Pen & Sword Ltd. ISBN 0-85052-835-6.

Military offices
Preceded by Sir Roger Backhouse	Third Sea Lord and Controller of the Navy; 1932–1934	Succeeded by Sir Reginald Henderson
Preceded by Sir Roger Backhouse	Commander-in-Chief, Home Fleet; 1939–1940	Succeeded by Sir John Tovey
Preceded by Sir Martin Dunbar-Nasmith	Commander-in-Chief, Plymouth; 1941–1943	Succeeded by Sir Ralph Leatham
