= P. M. K. Tennakoon =

Ceylonese politician

Pathiraja Mudiyanselage Kapuruhamy Tennekoon (born 16 May 1917) was a Ceylonese politician. He was the member of Parliament of Sri Lanka from Mihintale representing the Sri Lanka Freedom Party. He was defeated in the 1977 general election.
