= Deputy Chairman of Committees =

Position in the Parliament of Sri Lanka

Deputy Chairperson of Committees of Sri Lanka
- Incumbent; Hemali Weerasekara since 21 November 2024
- Inaugural holder: James Aubrey Martensz
- Formation: 14 October 1947

The Deputy Chairperson of Committees is a position in the Parliament of Sri Lanka.

== List of office holders ==
Parties

Independent All Ceylon Tamil Congress United National Party Sri Lanka Freedom Party Ilankai Tamil Arasu Kachchi Sri Lanka Muslim Congress Janatha Vimukthi Peramuna Tamil Eelam Liberation Organization National People's Power

Deputy Chairperson of Committees of the Parliament of Ceylon (1947–1972)
Name	Portrait	Tenure	Political party	Parliament	References
James Aubrey Martensz		14 October 1947 – 29 December 1948	Independent	1st	
Hameed Hussain Sheikh Ismail		11 January 1949 – 14 February 1951	Independent	1st	
T. Ramalingam		15 February 1951 – 8 April 1952	All Ceylon Tamil Congress	1st	
M. W. R. de Silva		9 June 1952 – 18 February 1956	United National Party	2nd	
R. S. Pelpola		19 April 1956 – 18 September 1958	Sri Lanka Freedom Party	3rd	
L. S. Jinasena		18 September 1958 – 5 December 1959	United National Party	3rd	
Hugh Fernando		30 March 1960 – 23 April 1960	United National Party	4th	
A. M. Adikari		5 August 1960 – 17 October 1962	Sri Lanka Freedom Party	5th	
D. A. Rajapaksa		6 November 1962 – 10 February 1964	Sri Lanka Freedom Party	5th	
I. A. Cader		12 February 1964 – 17 December 1964	Sri Lanka Freedom Party	5th	
Thomas Quentin Fernando		5 April 1965 – 22 April 1967	United National Party	6th	
Razik Fareed		18 May 1967 – 28 September 1967	United National Party	6th	
M. Sivasithamparam		29 September 1967 – 8 March 1968	Ilankai Tamil Arasu Kachchi	6th	
G. J. P. Perera		9 March 1968 – 25 March 1970	United National Party	6th	
Senapala Samarasekera		22 July 1970 – 22 May 1972	Sri Lanka Freedom Party	7th	
Deputy Chairperson of Committees of the National State Assembly (1972–1978)
Name	Portrait	Tenure	Political party	Assembly	References
Senapala Samarasekera		22 May 1972 – 10 July 1976	Sri Lanka Freedom Party	1st	
C. Arulampalam		23 July 1976 – 18 May 1977	Sri Lanka Freedom Party	1st	
C. R. Beligammana		4 August 1977 – 6 September 1977	United National Party	2nd	
Edmund Samarawickrema		7 September 1977 – 7 September 1978	United National Party	2nd	
Deputy Chairperson of Committees of the Parliament of Sri Lanka (1978–present)
Name	Portrait	Tenure	Political party	Parliament	References
Edmund Samarawickrema		7 September 1978 – 20 December 1988	United National Party	8th	
Ariya B. Rekawa		9 March 1989 – 24 June 1994	United National Party	9th	
Rauff Hakeem		25 August 1994 – 10 October 2000	Sri Lanka Muslim Congress	10th	
Lalith Dissanayake		18 October 2000 – 10 October 2001	Sri Lanka Freedom Party	11th	
Siri Andrahennady		19 December 2001 – 7 February 2004	United National Party	12th	
M. Satchithanandan		18 May 2004 – 25 August 2006	United National Party	13th	
Piyasiri Wijenayake		5 September 2006 – 4 October 2006	Janatha Vimukthi Peramuna	13th	
Ramalingam Chandrasekar		5 October 2006 – 20 April 2010	Janatha Vimukthi Peramuna	13th	
Murugesu Chandrakumar		22 April 2010 – 26 June 2015	Eelam People's Democratic Party	14th	
Selvam Adaikalanathan		20 January 2015 – 3 March 2020	Tamil Eelam Liberation Organization	15th	
Angajan Ramanathan		20 August 2020 – 24 September 2024	Sri Lanka Freedom Party	16th	
Hemali Weerasekara		21 November 2024 – present	National People's Power	17th	

== See also ==
Parliament of Sri Lanka
Cabinet of Sri Lanka
