= Soma Kumari Tennakoon =

Sri Lankan politician

Hon. Soma Kumari Tennakoon

Personal details
- Born: 18 June 1960 Sri Lanka
- Died: 24 September 2009 (aged 49) Hambantota
- Party: United People's Freedom Alliance
- Spouse: S. B. Nawinne
- Relations: Mudiyanse (father),
- Children: 2
- Profession: Politician

Soma Kumari Tennakoon (18 June 1960 – 24 September 2009) was a Sri Lankan politician from the Kurunegala District. She was a former member of the Parliament of Sri Lanka and served as a top member of the Wayamba Provincial Council representing the United People's Freedom Alliance. She also held the title of chairman of Laksala. At the time of her death, she was visiting Hambantota in order to help the Southern Provincial council elections. She was the daughter of Mudiyanse Tennakoon who was a member of parliament, from 1956 to 1977.
