= H. de Z. Siriwardena =

Ceylonese politician (born 1898)

Hector de Zoysa Siriwardena, CBE (born 12 June 1898) was a Ceylonese politician.

Siriwardena was elected as the member for Negombo on 2nd State Council of Ceylon in 1942 following the death of the sitting member, Charles Edward Perry de Silva. In 1947 the Soulbury Constitution replaced the State Council with the Parliament of Ceylon, as part of a process of constitutional development leading up to the country's independence.

At the 1st parliamentary election, held on 16 September 1947, Siriwardena successfully ran as the United National Party candidate in the Negombo electorate, in a three-way contest, narrowly winning against the Lanka Sama Samaja Party candidate, Santiago Fernando, by only 956 votes. He was subsequently appointed as Parliamentary Secretary to the Minister for Industry in the D. S. Senanayake cabinet. He did not contest the 2nd parliamentary election in 1952 and was instead appointed to the Senate of Ceylon and served as Parliamentary Secretary to the Minister of Home Affairs.

He was appointed a Commander of the Order of the British Empire (CBE) in the 1954 Birthday Honours.
