= Murugesu Chandrakumar =

Sri Lankan politician

Hon. Murugesu Chandrakumar MP

Member of Parliament for Jaffna District
- In office 1994–2000
- In office 2010–2015

Personal details
- Born: 3 August 1964 (age 61)
- Party: samaththuva kadchi
- Ethnicity: Sri Lankan Tamil

Murugesu Chandrakumar is a Sri Lankan Politician. He was a member of the Parliament of Sri Lanka and the Deputy Chairman of Committees. He belongs to the Eelam People's Democratic Party. However, he contested under the symbol of United People's Freedom Alliance. He quit the Eelam People's Democratic Party and contested independently in 2020 Sri Lankan parliamentary elections.
