= R. C. Kannangara =

Sri Lankan plantation owner and politician (1920–1946)

Richard Charles Kannangara (15 June 1920 – 14 October 1946) was a Ceylonese tea plantation owner and politician.

On 3 March 1936 Kannangara was elected to the 2nd State Council of Ceylon representing Morawaka. Kannangara defeated the sitting member, Dr. S. A. Wickramasinghe, of the Lanka Sama Samaja Party by a margin of 2,910 votes. Kannangara was superintendent and owner of a tea plantation in Deniyaya, and his campaign was backed by Sir Don Baron Jayatilaka, the Leader of the House and Minister for Home Affairs. After his election to the State Council he joined the Sinhala Maha Sabha. Kannangara sat on the Executive Committee on Agriculture and Lands. He died whilst still in office on 14 October 1946. At the subsequent by-election in 1947 Wickramasinghe was elected by a majority of 23,823 votes, and sat for a brief period on the Council until it was disbanded in July 1947.
