= George Roland Whitby =

British tea planter

Hon. George Roland Whitby

Member of the Ceylon Parliament for Community (appointed member)
- In office 1947–1948
- Preceded by: seat created

Personal details
- Born: 12 February 1878 Yeovil, Somerset, England
- Died: 21 July 1966 (aged 88) Weston Turville, Buckinghamshire, England
- Spouse: Laura Gill Julian née Windeyer
- Children: Georgette Aline Mary, Cherise Maybeth Julian
- Education: King's School, Bruton

George Roland Whitby (12 February 1878 – 21 July 1966) was a British tea planter, businessman and a member of parliament.

George Roland Whitby was born in Yeovil, Somerset, England on 12 February 1878, the second of six children (oldest son) to Joseph Whitby (1836-1915), a glove maker, and Maud Mary née Forster (1852-1945). He was educated at King's School, Bruton, Somerset.

In August 1896 he travelled from Liverpool on board the S.S. Staffordshire, arriving in Colombo on 2 September. From 1898 to 1899 he was the manager of the Polatagama tea estate.

On 8 December 1915 he married Laura Gill Julian née Windeyer (1894-1969) and they had two daughters, Georgette Aline Mary (b. 1916) and Cherise Maybeth Julian.

In 1935 he was appointed as the Managing Director of British Ceylon Corporation Limited and the British Ceylon Milling Company.

In 1942 he was appointed as a Justice of the Peace.

Between 1943 and 1946 he served on the Rubber Research Board.

Following Ceylon's first parliamentary elections in 1947, Whitby was appointed as a member of the Ceylon House of Representatives. He was one of six members appointed by the Governor-General, to represent important interests which were not represented or inadequately represented in the House. Whitby resigned his appointment in early 1948 due to illness.

Whitby died on 21 July 1966 in Weston Turville, Buckinghamshire, England.
