= Lionel Jayatilleke =

Sri Lankan politician (1924–1988)

Hon. Lionel Jayatilleke

Member of Parliament for Kuliyapitiya
- In office 1977–1988

Personal details
- Born: 1924
- Died: 1988 (aged 63–64)
- Party: United National Party

Lionel Jayatilleke (July 24, 1924 – September 1988) was a Sri Lankan politician. He was elected for Kuliyapitiya in the 8th parliamentary election in 1977. He was assassinated, allegedly by the extremist Sinhalese group the Janatha Vimukthi Peramuna (People's Liberation Front) for his party's support of the Indo-Sri Lanka Accord.
