= S. Dharmaretnam =

Honourable S. Dharmaretnam MSC

Member of the State Council of Ceylon
- In office 1938–1943
- Preceded by: S. O. Canagaratnam
- Constituency: Batticaloa South

Personal details
- Died: 1952 Colombo, Ceylon
- Ethnicity: Ceylon Tamil

Andrew Sabapathipillai Dharmaretnam (died 1952) was a Ceylon Tamil politician and member of the State Council of Ceylon.

Dharmaretnam had been a Vanniyar since the age of 17. He and his brother Rajaratnam owned large pieces of land in the old Batticaloa District, from Verugal to Pottuvil. Dharmaretnam's son Puvirajakeerthi (known as Keerthy or Dharmakeerthy) was one of the first Batticaloa Tamils to attend the University of Cambridge. Dharmaretnam was the paternal grandfather of Taraki Sivaram, a journalist murdered during the Sri Lankan Civil War.

Dharmaretnam was elected to the State Council of Ceylon in September 1938 following the death of S. O. Canagaratnam. He represented the Batticaloa South constituency until November 1943 when he resigned due to ill-health.

Dharmaretnam was in an abusive relationship with his wife Alagamma and was known to have had extra-marital affairs. After slitting his wrist Dharmaretnam went to into the jungle to die. He didn't die and was found a few days later in a jungle clearing, delirious, his physical and mental health irrecoverably damaged. Sick and dependent on others, he died seven years later in 1952 at a Colombo hospital.
