= J. H. Ilangantileke =

Colonial-era Ceylonese politician

John Herbert Ilangatileke was a Colonial-era Ceylonese politician.

He was elected to the 2nd State Council of Ceylon on 29 February 1936, representing Puttalam. He served on the executive committee for Home Affairs. He died on 27 July 1943 whilst still holding office. His position was filled by Ukku Banda Wanninayake, who was elected in the subsequent by-election on 27 November 1943.
