= R. P. Gaddum =

British politician

Hon. Reginald Percy Gaddum

Member of the Ceylon Parliament for Appointed member
- In office May 1952 – December 1956

State Council of Ceylon Appointed member
- In office 30 April 1938 – 10 January 1939
- Preceded by: Evelyn Charles Villiers
- Succeeded by: Evelyn Charles Villiers

Personal details
- Born: 28 July 1898 Gampola, Sri Lanka
- Died: 1957
- Spouse: Doreen Eleanor née Burmester
- Relations: George Percy (father), Jessie Doris (mother)
- Children: Elizabeth Jessie; Moyra Eleanor; Patricia Benita; Shelagh Ann; Ruth Phoebe

Reginald Percy Gaddum (28 July 1898 – 1957) was a tea planter in Ceylon and a member of parliament from 1952 to 1956.

Reginald Percy Gaddum was born in 1898 at Gona Adika Estate in Gampola, the son of George Percy and Jessie Doris. His father was an Englishman who had arrived in Ceylon in 1891. Gaddum began his planting career as a "creeper" (Note: A creeper was an individual who was apprenticed to an experienced manager to learn the business of tea planting.) at the age of 15 years. In 1935 he became the youngest Chairman of the Planters' Association of Ceylon, a position in which he served for three years. On 30 April 1938 he was appointed as a member of the 2nd State Council of Ceylon, following the resignation of Evelyn Charles Villiers. In 1939, he became a director of a commercial firm and resigned from the State Council on 10 January.

Gaddum was a keen sportsman, especially in tennis where he teamed up with his brother-in-law to win the national doubles title in three successive years in the early 1920s.

During the First World War he served as a squadron leader of the Royal Air Force.

Gaddum was a nominated member of the second Parliament (1952-1956). He ended his career as Managing Director of Aitken Spence.

Gaddum married Doreen Eleanor née Burmester at St. Paul's Church, Kandy, they had five daughters, Elizabeth Jessie (1923–1990), Moyra Eleanor (1924–2012), Patricia Benita (1926–2013), Shelagh Ann (1928–2004) and Ruth Phoebe (1933–2015).
