= Katana Electoral District =

Electoral district of Sri Lanka

Katana electoral district was an electoral district of Sri Lanka between March 1960 and February 1989. The district was named after the town of Katana in Gampaha District, Western Province. The 1978 Constitution of Sri Lanka introduced the proportional representation electoral system for electing members of Parliament. The existing 160 mainly single-member electoral districts were replaced with 22 multi-member electoral districts. Katana electoral district was replaced by the Gampaha multi-member electoral district at the 1989 general elections.

== Members of Parliament ==
Key

Independent SLFP UNP

Election	Member	Party	Term
1960 (March)	Wijayapala Mendis	UNP	1960-1960
1960 (July)	Wijayapala Mendis	UNP	1960-1965
1965	Wijayapala Mendis	UNP	1965-1970
1970	K. C. de Silva	SLFP	1970-1975
1975 (by-election)	Wijayapala Mendis	UNP	1975-1977
1977	Wijayapala Mendis	UNP	1977-1989

== Elections ==
=== 1960 (March) Parliamentary General Election ===
Candidate	Party	Symbol	Votes	%
Valid Votes				100.00%
Rejected Votes				
Total Polled				
Registered Electors				
Turnout				

=== 1960 (July) Parliamentary General Election ===
Candidate	Party	Symbol	Votes	%
Valid Votes				100.00%
Rejected Votes				
Total Polled				
Registered Electors				
Turnout				

=== 1965 Parliamentary General Election ===
Candidate	Party	Symbol	Votes	%
Valid Votes				100.00%
Rejected Votes				
Total Polled				
Registered Electors				
Turnout				

=== 1970 Parliamentary General Election ===
Candidate	Party	Symbol	Votes	%
Valid Votes				100.00%
Rejected Votes				
Total Polled				
Registered Electors				
Turnout				

=== 1977 Parliamentary General Election ===
Candidate	Party	Symbol	Votes	%
Wijayapala Mendis	United National Party	Elephant	23,950	53.31%
Vijaya Kumaranatunga	Sri Lanka Freedom Party	Hand	19,738	43.93%
Nanda De Silva	Communist Party	Star	1,045	2.33%
Nelson de Silva		Lamp	195	0.43%
Valid Votes			44,928	100.00%
Rejected Votes			115	
Total Polled			45,043	
Registered Electors			51,977	
Turnout			86%	
