= R. B. Tennekoon =

Sri Lankan politician

Ran Banda Tennekoon was a Sri Lankan politician. He was the member of Parliament of Sri Lanka from Yapahuwa representing the Sri Lanka Freedom Party.

He was elected to parliament from Yapahuwa in the March 1960 general election defeating U. B. Wanninayake. He lost is seat a few months later in the July 1960 general election U. B. Wanninayake.
