= J. G. Rajakulendran =

Ceylon Tamil politician and teacher

John Gladstone Rajakulendran (20 September 1907 – 27 February 1950) was a Ceylon Tamil politician and teacher.

John Gladstone Rajakulendran was born in Manipay, Ceylon, on 20 September 1907, the son of Dr. Vethanayagam R. John. His brother was T. G. Francis, owner of the horse ‘Cotton Hall’ and the President of the YWCA Colombo. Rajakulendran studied at the English Memorial School Manipay and St. John's College, Jaffna. Having qualified as a trained teacher in Colombo, he taught at Wesley College, Colombo.

Rajakulendran moved to Nawalapitiya and three months later was elected a Member of the Nawalapitiya Urban Council. In 1938 he was elected Chairman of the Urban Council, a role he retained until 1942. In 1940 he was appointed the principal of Kathireshan College, Nawalapitiya, serving in that position until his death in 1950.

On 11 October 1943 he won the seat of Bandarawela on the 2nd State Council of Ceylon at a by-election, representing for the Labour Party, where he served on the Executive Committee for Labour, Industry and Commerce. In 1945 he was appointed as acting Minister of Labour Industries and Commerce.

In November 1945 he enrolled at Lincoln's Inn to study law.

In July 1946, along with G. G. Ponnambalam (Council member for Point Pedro), Rajakulendran visited England as delegates of the All Ceylon Tamil Congress, where they participated in discussions with the Secretary of State and other Members of the State Council on Constitutional Reforms.

In 1947 D. S. Senanayake recommended he run as the United National Party candidate for Haputale at the 1st parliamentary election. Rajakulendram finished fifth in a field of five, only securing 327 votes.

He was also the first President of The Ceylon Bankers’ Employees Union from 1945 to 1946.

He died in London on 27 February 1950, whilst still studying for his law degree.
