= J. Tyagaraja =

Ceylon Tamil barrister, politician

Honourable J. Tyagaraja MSC

Member of the State Council of Ceylon
- In office 1944–1947
- Preceded by: J. I. Gnanamuttu
- Constituency: Mannar-Mullaitivu

Personal details
- Born: 18 October 1895
- Party: United National Party
- Education: Christ's College, Cambridge
- Occupation: Lawyer
- Ethnicity: Ceylon Tamil

Jaganathan Tyagaraja (born 18 October 1895) was a Ceylon Tamil barrister, politician and member of the State Council of Ceylon.

Tyagaraja was born on 18 October 1895. He was the son of Namasivayam Tyagaraja, a wealthy landed proprietor from Colombo, the capital of Ceylon. Tyagaraja was educated at Royal College, Colombo. After school he joined Christ's College, Cambridge, graduating with LLB and master's degrees. He was subsequently called to the bar.

Tyagaraja tried unsuccessfully to obtain a seat on the Legislative Council of Ceylon following the death of P. Ramanathan. He abided by the Jaffna Youth Congress' call to boycott the 1931 State Council election. The following year most of the Tamil politicians who had boycotted the election, including Tyagaraja, condemned the boycott.

Tyagaraja contested the 1944 State Council by-election as a candidate in Mannar-Mullaitivu and was elected to the State Council of Ceylon. Tyagaraja supported G. G. Ponnambalam's call for balanced representation in the Ceylonese legislature but nevertheless voted for self-government as recommended by the Soulbury Commission.

Tyagaraja contested the 1947 parliamentary election as a United National Party candidate in Mannar but was defeated by C. Sittampalam. His defeat has been attributed to his support for the Soulbury Constitution.

Tyagaraja played a key role in the establishment of the Central Bank of Ceylon and was an appointed member of its monetary board for 21 years (1950–71).

== Electoral history ==
Electoral history of J. Tyagaraja
Election	Constituency	Party	Votes	Result
1944 state council (by)	Mannar-Mullaitivu			Elected
1947 parliamentary	Mannar	United National Party	3,381	Not elected
