= Presidential Commission of Inquiry =

A Presidential Commission of Inquiry is a major ad-hoc formal public inquiry into a defined issue ordered by the President of Sri Lanka to report findings, give advice and make recommendations.

== Types ==
Two types of inquiries can be commissioned;

- Commission of Inquiry appointed under the provisions of the Commission of Inquiry Act of 1948, which as since been amended in 1950, 1953, 1955 and 2008.
- Special Presidential Commission of Inquiry appointed under the provisions of the Special Presidential Commissions of Inquiry Law, No. 07 of 1978.

== Powers ==
=== Commission of Inquiry ===
- Procure and receive all evidence (written or oral) regarding the matter inquired
- Examine all persons whom the commission thinks should be procured or examined as witnesses
- Require the evidence (written or oral) of any witness to be given on oath or affirmation
- Summon any person residing in Sri Lanka to attend any meeting of the commission to give evidence or produce any document or others in his possession, and to examine him as a witness or require him to produce any document or others in his possession
- Admit any evidence (written or oral) notwithstanding any of the provisions of the Evidence Ordinance
- to admit or exclude the public from the inquiry or any part
- to admit or exclude the press from the inquiry or any part
- to obtain certified copies of any proceedings of any case, any document, any other material filed or recorded at any Court of Law or at any tribunal and to require any person to produce any document or material which is in his/her possession or custody.
- to require any person to provide whatever the information which he/she possesses, in writing.

=== Special Presidential Commission of Inquiry ===
A Special Presidential Commission of Inquiry is more powerful than a Commission of Inquiry with powers;

- to subject a person found guilty to civic disability, were as a Commission of Inquiry is a fact finding commission whose findings are not enforceable.
- A report, finding, order, determination, ruling or recommendation made by a Special Presidential Commission cannot be questioned in any court or tribunal as well.

== Membership ==
The President of Sri Lanka has the power to appoint a Commission of Inquiry under a presidential warrant with one or more members. In a Special Presidential Commission of Inquiry, the President will appoint of a member each of whom is a Judge of the Supreme Court, Court of Appeal, High Court or the District Court.

== Notable commissions ==
Commissions of inquiry

- Commission to Enquire into Bribery in the State Council of Ceylon (The L. M. D. de Silva Commission) - 1941/1943
- Commission of Inquiry to Investigate in the Colombo Municipal Council (The M. W. H. de Silva Commission) - 1949
- Parliamentary Bribery Commission (The Thalagodapitiya Commission) - 1959
- Lessons Learnt and Reconciliation Commission
- Commission of Inquiry to Investigate and Inquire into Serious Violations of Human Rights (The Udalagama Commission)

Special presidential commissions of inquiry

- Presidential Commission of Inquiry on the Easter Attacks
- Presidential Commission of Inquiry on Bond Issuance
- Presidential Commission of Inquiry on the death of Lieutenant General Denzil Kobbekaduwa (The Tissa Dias Bandaranayake Commission)
- Presidential Commission of Inquiry on the death of Lalith Athulathmudali (The Athulathmudali Commission)
- Presidential Commission of Inquiry on the death of Vijaya Kumaratunga (The Vijaya Kumaratunga Commission)
- Presidential Commission of Inquiry in relation to the activities of Non-Governmental Organizations
- Presidential Commission of Inquiry in relation to the Malpractices and Corruption in State Institutions
- Presidential Commission of Inquiry to investigate and inquire into Serious Acts of Fraud, Corruption and Abuse of Power, State Resources and Privileges (PRECIFAC)
- Presidential Commission of Inquiry to inquire into the alleged VAT fraud at the Department of Inland Revenue (Paranagama Commission)
- Presidential Commission on the Disappeared (The Mahanama Tilakaratne Commission)
- Presidential Commission of Inquiry to investigate the management of SriLankan Airlines and Mihin Lanka (during the period of January 2006 to January 2018).
- The Commission of Inquiry into the establishment and maintenance of places of unlawful detention and touture chambers at the Batalanda Housing Scheme

== See also ==
- Royal commission
- Presidential commission (United States)
