= Upali Tennakoon =

Sri Lankan journalist

- උපාලි තෙන්නකෝන්

Editor of Divaina
- In office 1994–2003

Editor of Rivira
- In office 1994–2009

Personal details
- Spouse: Dhammika
- Profession: Journalist

Upali Tennakoon is a Sri Lankan journalist. He was the founding editor of the Sinhala language newspaper Rivira. He was earlier the editor of Divaina. He was attacked on 23 January 2009 by four men on motorbikes along with wife Dhammika with knives and sticks. Tennakoon had written an article about a high-ranking army official before the attack. After the attack he went into exile to the United States. His wife Dhammika works with the University Grants Commission.
