= Kavisena Herath =

Ceylonese politician

Hon. Kavisena Herat

Member of the Ceylon Parliament for Nikaweratiya
- In office 1947–1956
- Preceded by: seat created
- Succeeded by: Mudiyanse Tennakoon
- In office 1964–1965
- Preceded by: Mudiyanse Tennakoon
- Succeeded by: Mudiyanse Tennakoon

Personal details
- Born: Kalukumara Wanninayake Range Bandaralage Kavisena Herat; 16 February 1916
- Died: 11 December 1991 (aged 75)
- Spouse: Lalitha née Wickremesinghe
- Children: 4
- Occupation: Politician

Kalukumara Wanninayake Range Bandaralage Kavisena Herat (16 February 1916 – 11 December 1991) was a Ceylonese politician.

He was elected to first Parliament of Ceylon at the 1947 parliamentary elections, as an independent, representing the Nikaweratiya electorate, securing 7,316 votes (51.5% of the total vote) defeating the United National Party candidate, U. B. Wanninayake, by 582 votes.

Herat retained the seat at the subsequent 2nd parliamentary election, where he was re-elected with 11,999 votes (62.75% of the total vote).

At the 3rd parliamentary election in April 1956 Herat ran as the United National Party candidate but was defeated by Mudiyanse Tennakoon, who represented the newly created Sri Lanka Freedom Party, 15,914 votes to 7,829 votes.

Herat ran again at both the 4th parliamentary election and 5th parliamentary elections held in March and July 1960, however he lost both times to the incumbent, Tennakoon by 5,028 and 3,597 vote margins respectively.

In December 1963 Tennakoon was expelled from the Sri Lanka Freedom Party and resigned his position in parliament in protest. At the 1964 parliamentary by-election, held on 1 April 1964, Tennakoon contested the seat as an independent, but was defeated by Herat, who secured 13,915 votes to Tennakoon's 10,675.

At the 6th parliamentary election held on 22 March 1965, Herat lost the seat of Nikaweratiya, by a 1,358 vote margin to Tennakoon, who again ran as an independent.

Herat contested the 7th parliamentary election held on 27 May 1970, however this time as an independent. Herat came fifth in a field of six candidates, only securing 682 votes (1.5% of the total vote).
