= G. C. Rambukpotha =

George Christopher Rambukpotha (8 December 1884 – 27 October 1943) was a colonial-era Ceylonese lawyer and politician.

George Christopher Rampukpotha was born on 8 December 1884, the eldest son of Peter Benjamin Punchi Bandara Rambukpotha, the Rate Mahatmaya of Wellawaya, and Charlotte Elizabeth Taldene née Kumarihamy. He was educated at St. Benedict's College, Colombo. He was appointed as a Proctor at the Supreme Court ofCeylon.

In 1910 Rambukpotha married Annabelle Elizabeth Taldene née Kumarihamy (1891–1923) at the Town Hall in Kandy. They had five children.

On 4 May 1931 he was elected unopposed to the 1st State Council of Ceylon, representing Bibile. He was re-elected to the 2nd State Council on 5 March 1936.

Rambukpotha died, at the age of 59, on 27 October 1943.
