= J. I. Gnanamuttu =

Politician

Honourable J. I. Gnanamuttu MSC

Member of the State Council of Ceylon
- In office 1943–1944
- Preceded by: R. Sri Pathmanathan
- Succeeded by: J. Tyagaraja
- Constituency: Mannar-Mullaitivu

Personal details
- Died: 19 January 1944
- Ethnicity: Ceylon Tamil

Joseph Isaac Gnanamuttu (died 19 January 1944) was a Ceylon Tamil politician and member of the State Council of Ceylon.

Gnanamuttu contested the 1943 State Council by-election as a candidate in Mannar-Mullaitivu and was elected to the State Council of Ceylon. He died on 19 January 1944.
