= R. Sri Pathmanathan =

Hon. R. Sri Pathmanathan MSC

Member of the State Council of Ceylon
- In office 1936–1943
- Preceded by: S. M. Anantham
- Succeeded by: J. I. Gnanamuttu
- Constituency: Mannar-Mullaitivu

Personal details
- Died: 5 May 1943
- Education: University of Oxford
- Occupation: Lawyer
- Ethnicity: Ceylon Tamil

Ratnasabapathy Sri Pathmanathan (died 5 May 1943) was a Ceylon Tamil barrister-at-law, politician and member of the State Council of Ceylon.

Sri Pathmanathan was the nephew of P. Ramanathan and P. Arunachalam. He had a MA degree from the University of Oxford.

Sri Pathmanathan contested the 1934 State Council by-election in Point Pedro but was defeated by G. G. Ponnambalam. He contested the 1936 State Council election as a candidate in Mannar-Mullaitivu and was elected to the State Council of Ceylon. He died whilst still in office on 5 May 1943. His position on the council was taken by Gnanamuthu Isaac, at the subsequent by-election on 28 August.

== Electoral history ==
Electoral history of R. Sri Pathmanathan
Election	Constituency	Votes	Result
1934 state council (by)	Point Pedro	2,032	Not elected
1936 state council	Mannar-Mullaitivu		Elected
