= Nikaweratiya =

Nikaweratiya නිකවැරටිය
- Town
- Location within Sri Lanka
- Coordinates: 7°44′51″N 80°06′56.2″E
- Country: Sri Lanka
- District: Kurunegala

Area
  - Total: 115 km^{2} (44 sq mi)

Population
  - Total: 48,770
- Time zone: UTC+5:30 (SLST)
- Postal code: 60470
- Area code: 037
- Website: www.nikaweratiya.ds.gov.lk

Nikaweratiya is a town in the North Western Province of Sri Lanka. It consists of 42 Grama Niladari divisions. The division of Nikaweratiya is the second largest electoral division in Sri Lanka and its extent only second to the Monaragala Electoral Division. This region which is famous for agriculture since the past is nourished with lakes and canals.

== Historical background ==
Nikaweratiya is situated in Magal Othota Koralaya in Wanni Hathpaththuwa in the District of Kurunegala, and bears historical importance. There are twenty two Buddhist temples out of which the Budhumuththawa Raja Maha Vihara is very special and also Halambagala Raja Maha Viharaya is a special temple located in Nikaweratiya.

== Education ==
There are two government secondary schools: Mahasen National College; and Jayanthi College and several primary schools in Nikwaratiya and the surrounding area.

== Transport ==
The Nikwaratiya CTB Depot provides transport service to the area through private bus operators.

== Economy ==
Agriculture is the main source of income for residents in Nikawaratiya. There are several commercial banks have branches in Nikwaratiya.

Nikawaratiya is one Divisional secretary area of Kurunegala District which government administrative system

== Divisional secretaries (up to 2012) ==
Name
W. G. Dayananda
H. M. Sunil Padma Shantha
W. G. Dayananda
H. M. Karunarathna
Ranwaththe Premasiri Appuhami
Suraweera Manthreerathna
A. H. S. Wijesinghe
S. M. Jayathilake
R. A. S. Jayathilake
T. B. Wickramasinghe
W. M. C. K. Wanninayaka
P. Susantha Jayathilake
