= Wijayapala Mendis =

Sri Lankan politician

Hon. Wijayapala Mendis

Chief Opposition Whip
- In office 25 August 1994 – 21 July 1998

Leader of the House
- In office 7 May 1993 – 24 June 1994
- Preceded by: Ranil Wickramasinghe
- Succeeded by: Ratnasiri Wickremanayake

Personal details
- Born: 16 December 1928 British Ceylon
- Died: 1 September 2012 (aged 83) Sri Lanka
- Party: United National Party
- Other political affiliations: People's Alliance
- Spouse: Nanda de Silva
- Children: 4
- Education: Maris Stella College, Negombo; Harischandra National College, Negombo
- Occupation: Politician

Thenahandi Wijayapala Hector Mendis (16 December 1928 – 1 September 2012) was a Sri Lankan politician and a member of the Parliament of Sri Lanka.

== Life and career ==
Mendis was born on 16 December 1928, third child of the former Mayor of Negombo, Mudliyar David Mendis and Magilin. He began his political career by joining United National Party Youth League of Negombo at age 19 and in 1955 he was elected Mayor of Negombo at the age of 26, becoming the youngest person to hold the position.

In 1960 he entered Parliament from the Katana electorate as a United National Party candidate, and was re-elected in 1965 when he was promoted to Parliamentary Secretary to the Minister of Public Works, Post and Telecommunications. Except for a brief period after the defeat at the 1970 general election he represented the seat until 1989. After the landslide victory by the United National Party in the 1977 general election, he was appointed Minister of Textile Industries in 1977 and in 1989 he was Minister of Transport and Highways. In 1993 after the assassination of President Premadasa and Ranil Wickremesinghe became Prime Minister, he was appointed Leader of the House.

Mendis became the Chief Opposition Whip after the 1994 parliamentary election until 1998 when he joined the People's Alliance Government with the United National Party alternative group in opposition to the United National Party leadership. He lost his seat in 2001.

He was married to Nanda de Silva for 59 years. They had three daughters and one son, Manouri, Davindra, Dilupa and Nadika.

Wijayapala Mendis died on 1 September 2012 at the age of 83.
