= Negombo Electoral District =

Electoral district of Sri Lanka

Negombo electoral district was an electoral district of Sri Lanka between August 1947 and February 1989. The district was named after the town of Negombo in present-day Gampaha District, Western Province. The 1978 Constitution of Sri Lanka introduced the proportional representation electoral system for electing members of Parliament. The existing 160 mainly single-member electoral districts were replaced with 22 multi-member electoral districts. Negombo electoral district was replaced by the Gampaha multi-member electoral district at the 1989 general elections, the first under the PR system, though Negombo continues to be a polling division of the multi-member electoral district.

== Members of Parliament ==
Key

Independent SLFP UNP

Election	Member	Party	Term
1947	H. de Z. Siriwardena	UNP	1947-1952
1952	A. N. D. A. Abeysinghe	UNP	1952-1956
1956	Hector Fernando	LSSP	1956-1960
1960	T. Quintin Fernando	UNP	1960-1960
1960	T. Quintin Fernando	UNP	1960-1965
1965	T. Quintin Fernando	UNP	1965-1967
1967 (by-election)	Denzil Fernando	UNP	1967-1970
1970	Denzil Fernando	UNP	1970-1977
1977	Denzil Fernando	UNP	1977-1989

== Elections ==
=== 1947 Parliamentary General Election ===
Results of the 1st parliamentary election held between 23 August 1947 and 20 September 1947 for the district:

Candidate	Party	Symbol	Votes	%
H. de Z. Siriwardena	United National Party	Butterfly	10,174	39.20
W. S. Fernando	Lanka Sama Samaja Party	Elephant	9,218	35.52
A. L. J. Croos Rajchandra	Independent	Star	6,169	23.77
Valid Votes			25,561	98.50
Rejected Votes			390	1.5
Total Polled			25,951	100.00
Registered Electors			55,642	
Turnout				46.64

=== 1952 Parliamentary General Election ===
Results of the 2nd parliamentary election held between 24 May 1952 and 30 May 1952 for the district:

Candidate	Party	Symbol	Votes	%
A. N. D. A. Abeysinghe	United National Party	Hand	22,721	57.42
Hector Fernando	Lanka Sama Samaja Party	Star	9,396	23.75
M. B. G. Kurera	Independent	Elephant	3,396	8.58
C. M. Fernando	Independent	Key	3,207	8.10
K. C. D. Senanayake	Independent	Lamp	459	1.16
Valid Votes			39,179	99.01
Rejected Votes			390	0.99
Total Polled			39,569	100.00
Registered Electors			60,617	
Turnout				65.28

=== 1956 Parliamentary General Election ===
Results of the 3rd parliamentary election held between 5 April 1956 and 10 April 1956 for the district:

Candidate	Party	Symbol	Votes	%
Hector Fernando	Lanka Sama Samaja Party	Key	20,892	47.51
T. Quintin Fernando	United National Party	Elephant	18,212	41.42
Tudor B. Gunasekera		Lamp	4,589	10.44
Valid Votes			43,693	99.37
Rejected Votes			277	0.63
Total Polled			43,970	100.00
Registered Electors			67,060	
Turnout				65.57

=== 1960 (March) Parliamentary General Election ===
Results of the 4th parliamentary election held on 19 March 1960 for the district:

Candidate	Party	Symbol	Votes	%
T. Quintin Fernando	United National Party	Elephant	11,207	48.38
M. Bernard Kurera		Cockerel	5,786	24.98
L.C. Dissanayake		Winnow	3,360	14.50
W.S.M.M. Abeysekera	Sri Lanka Freedom Party	Hand	1,372	5.92
Valentine F. Wijeratne]		Sun	1,115	4.81
D.M.M. Jayawardane		Sewing Machine	156	0.67
Valid Votes			22,996	99.26
Rejected Votes			171	0.74
Total Polled			23,167	100.00
Registered Electors			32,569	
Turnout				71.13

=== 1960 (July) Parliamentary General Election ===
Results of the 5th parliamentary election held on 20 July 1960 for the district:

Candidate	Party	Symbol	Votes	%
T. Quintin Fernando	United National Party	Elephant	14,469	67.06%
M. Bernard Kurera	Sri Lanka Freedom Party	Hand	7,108	32.94%
Valid Votes			21,577	100.00%
Rejected Votes			124	
Total Polled			21,701	
Registered Electors			32,569	
Turnout			66.63%	

=== 1965 Parliamentary General Election ===
Results of the 6th parliamentary election held on 22 March 1965 for the district:

Candidate	Party	Symbol	Votes	%
T. Quintin Fernando	United National Party	Elephant	22,056	76.52%
M. Bernard Kurera	Sri Lanka Freedom Party	Hand	6,766	23.48%
Valid Votes			28,822	100.00%
Rejected Votes			188	
Total Polled			29,010	
Registered Electors			37,900	
Turnout			76.54%	

=== 1970 Parliamentary General Election ===
Results of the 7th parliamentary election held on 27 May 1970 for the district:

Candidate	Party	Symbol	Votes	%
Denzil Fernando	United National Party	Elephant	20,457	56.24%
Justin Fernando	Sri Lanka Freedom Party	Hand	15,920	43.76%
Valid Votes			36,377	100.00%
Rejected Votes			132	
Total Polled			36,509	
Registered Electors			44,284	
Turnout			82.44%	

=== 1977 Parliamentary General Election ===
Results of the 8th parliamentary election held on 21 July 1977 for the district:

Candidate	Party	Symbol	Votes	%
Denzil Fernando		Elephant	28,470	65.71%
Ananda Munasinghe		Hand	13,718	31.66%
W. Nelson Peiris		Key	1,018	2.35%
Gamini Fonseka		Ship	124	0.29%
Valid Votes			43,330	100.00%
Rejected Votes			161	
Total Polled			43,491	
Registered Electors			51,463	
Turnout			84.51%	
