= S. O. Canagaratnam =

Ceylon Tamil politician

Honourable S. O. Canagaratnam MSC

Member of the State Council of Ceylon for Batticaloa South
- In office 1936–1938
- Preceded by: A. H. Macan Markar
- Succeeded by: S. Dharmaretnam

Personal details
- Born: 1880
- Died: May 1938 (aged 57–58)
- Occupation: Civil servant
- Ethnicity: Ceylon Tamil

Sinnakutty Odayar Canagaratnam (Tamil: சின்னக்குட்டி உடையார் கனகரத்தினம், romanized: Ciṉṉakkuṭṭi Uṭaiyār Kaṉakarattiṉam; 1880 – May 1938) was a Ceylon Tamil civil servant, politician and member of the State Council of Ceylon.

== Early life and family ==
Canagaratnam was born in 1880. He was the son of Sinnakutty Odayar from Karaitivu in south-eastern Ceylon. He was educated at St. Andrew's English School, Batticaloa.

Canagaratnam was married to Muththamma, daughter of J. Abraham. They had four daughters - Daisy, Grace, Carmaline and Violet.

== Career ==
Canagaratnam joined the Government Clerical Service and was later appointed Deputy Fiscal for Batticaloa District and Chief Mudaliyar for the Eastern Province. After retirement Canagaratnam contested the 1936 state council election as a candidate for the Batticaloa South seat and was elected to the State Council of Ceylon. receiving 14,021 votes polled, against K.M. Abdul Majeed's 8,216 votes and the third placed M.A.L.Kariapper's 1,557 votes.

In 1921 Canagaratnam wrote a monograph, Monograph of the Batticaloa District of the Eastern Province, Ceylon. He died in May 1938.

== Electoral history ==
Electoral history of S. O. Canagaratnam
Election	Constituency	Party	Votes	Result
1936 State Council of Ceylon	Batticaloa South		14,021	Elected
