= Negombo Municipal Council =

Type
- Type: Local authority

Leadership
- Mayor: Don Robert Heenkenda, (NPP) since 6 May 2025
- Deputy Mayor: Edward Dulip Chamara Fernando, (NPP) since 6 May 2025

Structure
- Seats: 49
- Political groups: Government (27): NPP (27); Opposition (22): SJB (9); SLPP (1); SLMC (1); PA (1); Ind (10)

Elections
- Voting system: Open list proportional representation
- Last election: 6 May 2025
- Next election: TBD

The Negombo Municipal Council is the administrative body for Negombo. The council was established under the Municipalities Ordinance of 1878 as a Local Board of Negombo and Gate Mudaliyar A. E. Rajapakse was the first Chairmen of the Urban District Council in 1922. In 1950 the council become Municipal Council and it held first meeting on 1 January 1950. It is located in the Gampaha District. Negombo Municipal Council is one of the two Municipal Councils (Gampaha Municipal Council and Negombo Municipal Council) located in the Gampaha District.

== Representation ==
The Negombo Municipal Council is divided into 29 wards and is represented by 26 councillors, elected using an open list proportional representation system.

=== 2011 Local government election ===
Results of the local government election held on 8 October 2011.

| Alliances and parties | Votes | % | Seats |
|---|---|---|---|
| United People's Freedom Alliance (NC, ACMC, SLFP et al.) | 37,232 | 58.17% | 16 |
| United National Party | 24,712 | 38.61% | 9 |
| Sri Lanka Muslim Congress | 1,588 | 2.48% | 1 |
| Janatha Vimukthi Peramuna | 396 | 0.62% | 0 |
| United Democratic Front | 20 | 0.03% | 0 |
| Eksath Lanka Maha Sabha | 11 | 0.02% | 0 |
| Ruhunu Janatha Party | 10 | 0.02% | 0 |
| Independent Group 2 | 10 | 0.02% | 0 |
| Independent Group 1 | 8 | 0.01% | 0 |
| Independent Group 4 | 8 | 0.01% | 0 |
| Jana Setha Peramuna | 7 | 0.01% | 0 |
| Patriotic National Front | 1 | % | 0 |
| Independent Group 3 | 1 | % | 0 |
| Valid Votes | 64,004 | 96.86% | 26 |
| Rejected Votes | 2,077 | | |
| Total Polled | 66,081 | | |
| Registered Electors | 100,283 | | |
| Turnout | 67.48% | | |

The Negombo Municipal Council has five standing committees each headed by committee chairman. The standing committees are Finance, Industry and Works, Health and Development, Education and Welfare, Sports and Youth Affairs.
