= E. R. Tambimuttu =

Ceylon Tamil lawyer and politician

Honourable E. R. Tambimuttu MLC MSC
- ஈ. ஆர். தம்பிமுத்து

Member of the Legislative Council of Ceylon for Eastern Province
- In office 1921–1924

Member of the Legislative Council of Ceylon for Batticaloa
- In office 1924–1930

Member of the State Council of Ceylon for Trincomalee-Batticaloa
- In office 1936–1943
- Preceded by: M. M. Subramaniam
- Succeeded by: V. Nalliah

Personal details
- Born: c1890
- Spouse: Laura née Chitty
- Children: Laurel
- Profession: Lawyer
- Ethnicity: Ceylon Tamil

Emmanuel Rasanayagam Tambimuttu (Tamil: இம்மானுவேல் ராசநாயகம் தம்பிமுத்து, romanized: Im'māṉuvēl Rācanāyakam Tampimuttu; born c1890) was a Ceylon Tamil lawyer, politician and member of the Legislative Council of Ceylon and State Council of Ceylon.

== Early life and family ==
Tambimuttu was born around 1890. His ancestors were originally from Nallur but later settled in Batticaloa in eastern Ceylon.

Tambimuttu had a daughter - Laurel.

== Career ==
Tambimuttu was an advocate. He contested the 1921 legislative council election as a candidate for the Eastern Province seat and was elected to the Legislative Council of Ceylon unopposed. Tambimuttu contested the 1924 legislative council election as a candidate for the Batticaloa seat and was re-elected to the Legislative Council.

Tambimuttu did not contest the 1931 state council election due to the boycott organised by the Jaffna Youth Congress. He contested the 1936 state council election as a candidate for the Trincomalee-Batticaloa seat and was elected to the State Council of Ceylon. In June 1943 he was found guilty by the Bribery Commission of accepting bribes but as he refused to resign he was expelled from the State Council.

== Electoral history ==
Electoral history of E. R. Tambimuttu
Election	Constituency	Party	Votes	Result
1921 legislative council	Eastern Province		-	Elected
1924 legislative council	Batticaloa			Elected
1936 state council	Trincomalee-Batticaloa			Elected
