= Charles Batuwantudawe =

Sri Lankan politician

Charles de Silva Batuwantudawe (28 November 1877 – 13 September 1940) was a Ceylonese lawyer and politician.

Charles Batuwantudawe was born in Colombo on 28 November 1877 as the son of Pandit Don Andries de Silva Batuwantudawe. He received his education at Royal College, Colombo. After studying law in Ceylon he travelled to England in 1897. He was called to the Bar by Gray's Inn in June 1901. He returned to Ceylon after that.

In 1915, he was arrested by the British Government of Ceylon along with prominent Sinhalese leaders during the 1915 riots.

He was the Minister of Local Administration (1931–1936) in the State Council of Ceylon. As a supporter of trade unions, he was the President of the CWPA, the railway union of the workers of the Ceylon Government Railway (CGR).

He died whilst still in office on 13 September 1940.
