= Member of Parliament (Sri Lanka) =

Representative in the Parliament of Sri Lanka

- පාර්ලිමේන්තු මන්ත්‍රී பாராளுமன்ற உறுப்பினர்
- Emblem of Sri Lanka

- Flag of Sri Lanka

- Incumbent; 17th Parliament of Sri Lanka since 21 November 2024
- Parliament of Sri Lanka
- Style: The Honourable (used only as a courtesy by other Members of Parliament during debates in the Parliament)
- Status: Active
- Abbreviation: MP
- Member of: Parliament
- Reports to: Speaker
- Seat: Parliament of Sri Lanka
- Appointer: Electorates of Sri Lanka
- Term length: 5 years; renewable
- Constituting instrument: Constitution of Sri Lanka
- Formation: 14 October 1947 (78 years ago)
- First holder: 1st Parliament under the Soulbury Constitution
- Salary: See salaries and benefits
- Website: www.parliament.lk

In Sri Lanka a Member of Parliament (MP), is the title given to any one of the 225 individuals elected or appointed to serve in the Parliament of Sri Lanka.

== Electoral system ==
Of the 225 members, 196 are elected from 22 electoral districts, which are multi-member. The remaining 29 MPs are elected from National Lists allocated to the parties (and independent groups) in proportion to their share of the national vote.

== Elections ==
All MP positions become simultaneously vacant for elections held on a five-year cycle. If a vacancy arises at another time, due to death or resignation, then an electoral district vacancy may be filled by the second highest scoring candidate in the last election from that electoral district.

== Eligibility ==
Any Sri Lankan citizen may be elected to parliament unless disqualified to do so under the Article 90 of the Constitution, which includes any individual who is;

- President of Sri Lanka,
- A public officer, judicial officer or officer of a public corporation,
- A member of the Regular Force of the Army, Navy, or Air Force, with the exception of holders of the rank of Field Marshal, Admiral of the Fleet, or Marshal of the Air Force.
- A police officer or a public officer exercising police function,
- Declared as an undischarged bankrupt or insolvent in terms of the applicable law,
- Nominated as a candidate for more than one electoral district or as a candidate for more than one political party or group in the same district,
- A citizen of any foreign country,
- Adjudged guilty by a competent court or by a Special Presidential Commission of Inquiry.

== Title ==
An MP is known as The Honourable (The Hon. or Hon.) Name MP or simply as the Name MP, during their term in office. For instance, Eran Wickramaratne is generally known to be entitled as the Hon. Eran Wickramaratne MP, and can be also referred to as just Eran Wickramaratne MP. By tradition, former MPs continued to use the courtesy title The Hon. or Hon..

== Salaries and benefits ==
An average MP would earn more than Rs 270,000 including salary and other benefits, in-addition of attendance allowances.

== See also ==
- Member of Provincial Council
- List of members of the Sri Lankan Parliament who died in office
