= List of Archaeological Protected Monuments in Matale District =

This is a list of Archaeological Protected Monuments in Matale District, Sri Lanka.

Monument	Image	Location	Grama Niladhari Division	Divisional Secretary's Division	Registered	Description	Refs
Alakolaela ruins		Alakolaela		Matale	16 July 1948	Stupa, ruines image house	
Alakolahela Vihara		Moragaspitiya		Pallepola	8 July 2005	Stupa and other relative buildings	
Aluvihare Rock Temple		Aluvihare		Matale	11 October 1974	Caves with inscription and drip ledges	
Ambokka Raja Maha Vihara			Ambokka	Pallepola	30 December 2011	Cave temple, rock inscription, the flight of steps made in the natural rock, and other artifacts	
Ambokka Sri Pathini Devalaya, Kumara Bandara Devalaya, Rittageya and Kapsitawu geya			No. 422-E-Ambokka	Pallepola	6 June 2008		
Averiyapathaha Raja Maha Vihara			Walaswewa	Galewela	23 January 2009	Buddhist shrine, drip-ledged caves, pillar bases, rock inscription, chaitya and entrance steps	
Dambulla cave temple		Dambulla		Dambulla	30 August 1957		
Dambulugala inscriptions		Dambulla		Dambulla	20 August 1976	Inscriptions	
Doollewa Walawwa			Dollewa	Yatawatta	30 December 2011		
Embilla Raja Maha Vihara		Hulangamuwe	Hulangamuwe	Matale	12 June 2015	Cave temple with wall paintings	
Ganegoda Purana Raja Maha Vihara		Thenna		Matale	13 November 1998	Image house with paintings and sculptures	
Ganetenna Purana Raja Maha Vihara		Ganetenna		Rattota	13 November 1998	Image house with paintings and sculptures	
Garandigala Purana Vihara			Damunumulla	Galewela	6 June 2008	Drip-ledged rock cave vihara, 5 drip ledge rock caves and 2 rock inscriptions	
Gurubewila Purana Raja Maha Vihara		Gurubewila		Ambanganga Korale	13 November 1998	Image house with paintings and sculptures	
Hulangamuwe Maha Walawwa		Hulangamuwe	No. 33/B, Hulangamuwa Northa	Matale	12 June 2015	Monarawila Keppetipola Hulangamuwe Maha Walawwa	
Ibbankatuwa Megalithic Tombs			Ibbankatuwa	Galewela	23 October 2009		
Kaludiya Pokuna Archeological Forest Site		Kumbukkandanwala		Dambulla		Formerly known as Dakkhinagiri Vihara	
Kuda Rideelen Raja Maha Vihara		Kitulwatta Horagahapitiya	Horagahapitiya	Ukuwela	24 July 2009	Drip-ledged caves including a drip ledged cave temple (Len Vihara)	
Mahawehera Purana Vihara			Madipola	Galewela	6 June 2008	Buddhist shrine	
Matale Rebellion monument		Kohobiliwala	Kohobiliwala	Ukuwela	24 March 2016	Stone tablet erected for the commemoration "Matale Rebelion" at Matale Wariyapola junction	
Nagolla Pinthaliya			Nagolla	Ukuwela	6 July 2007		
Nagolla Forest Hermitage			Pahala Diggala	Galewela	6 June 2008	Fifteen caves, stupa and three inscriptions	
Nagolla Forest Hermitage			Pahala Diggala	Galewela	6 February 2009	Drip-ledged rock cave with inscriptions and dagoba on the rock cave	
Nagolla Forest Hermitage			Pahala Diggala	Galewela	12 June 2015	Drip-ledged cave complex with cave inscriptions in the area related to Gommottakanda	
Narangolla Purana Vihara			Narangolle-E	Ambanganga Korale	6 June 2008	Tampita vihara	
Nilagama Purana Vihara			Nilagama	Galewela	6 June 2008	Drip-ledged rock cave (Naipena Guhawa), drip ledged rock vihara with inscription	
Nisolena Raja Maha Vihara			Hath Ambukkuwa	Galewela	6 June 2008	Inscription drip ledged rock cave vihara and Buddha shrine	
Niyandagala Raja Maha Vihara		Gurulawela North	Gurulawela North	Ukuwela	12 June 2015	Cave temple and foot print stone	
Palapathwela Pallegane Pothgul Vihara		Dombawela		Matale	6 June 2008	Buddhist shrine	
Palapathwala Pallegane Pothugal Vihara			Dombuwela	Matale	22 October 2010	Image house and dwelling house	
Pallegama Raja Maha Vihara		Pallegama		Laggala-Pallegama	13 November 1998	Image house with paintings and sculptures	
Pandiwita Ambalama			Pandiwita	Matale	24 July 2009		
Paramaguru Swamy Madam and Pillayar Temple		Mandhandawela	E 350A Mandhandawela	Matale	13 February 2009		
Patigana Purana Vihara			No. 422-EPattiwela	Galewela	6 June 2008	Chaitiya mound and ruined buildings	
Pidurangala Vihara							
Ruwanmadugalle Kanda Vihara		Diggollayaya		Dambulla	23 January 2009	Steps hewn on the rock, the foundation for the pillars, natural pond	
Samanthalayaya ruins		Samanthalayaya		Dambulla	6 February 2009	Area in which rock pillars are situated at Galkuruyaya	
Sigiriya				Dambulla			
Silvathgala Raja Maha Vihara		Bambarakatupotha	Belikanda	Galewela	23 January 2009	Buddhist shrine, Chaitya, Discourse Hall, flight of steps hewn on the natural rock, pillar foundation, entrance to the drip ledged rock cave in the premises	
Sonuththa Raja Maha Vihara			Sonuththa	Wilgamuwa	6 June 2008	Ruined building with stone pillars, chaitiya mound of the northern side of the vihara	
Sudugala Forest Hermitage		Imihaminegama	Polpithigama	Galewela	6 June 2008	Drip-ledged rock caves with inscriptions	
Sulunapahura Vihara		Galagama		Yatawatta	22 October 1965		
Thalgahagoda Raja Maha Vihara		Thalgahagoda		Yatawatta	24 March 1963	Image house with paintings and sculptures, inscriptions with Brahmi letters, building ruins and Sandakada pahana	
Estate Bungalow, Warakawela Group		Red Bana Gama	Magahathenna Dombawela	Ukuwela	22 October 2010		
The official quarters of the Administrative Officers of the British period		Rajaweediya		Matale	6 July 2007		
Udasgiriya Bodhi Malu Vihara			No. 336 Udasgiriya	Yatawatta	24 July 2009	Tampita Viharaya (Viharaya built on stone piles)	
Veherabendihinna Vihara		Pathkolagolla	No. E/432 Pathkolagolle	Galewela	23 January 2009	Building ruins with stone pillars, natural pond, rock inscriptions, flower pedestal, parapet wall and stupa mound	
Veherabendi Yaya Purana Vihara			No. 433D Meevalapathaha	Galewela	24 July 2009	Building premises with stone pillars, Chaitya Godella (hillock) in the Veherabendi Yaya Purana Viharaya premises and drip-ledged cave, two hill inscriptions and flight of steps in the eastern slope of the Beliyakanda mountain situated in the south western direction of the Vihara premises	
Veheragoda Purana Raja Maha Vihara		Udupihilla		Matale	13 November 1998	Image house with paintings and sculptures	
Weherabandigala Raja Maha Vihara			Devagiriya	Wilgamuwa	6 June 2008	Stupa	
Weherabandiyaya Sri Chaithiya Wardanarama Vihara			Meewalapathaha	Galewela	6 June 2008	Chaitya mound	
Welangahawatta Sri Dhamajothiyarama Vihara			No. : A/376, Welangahawatta	Rattota	9 September 2011	Tampita Image house with preaching hall	
Weheragala Archaeological Site		Usseththewa		Naula	7 June 2013	All that divided and defined allotment of land called the Weheragala Archaeological Site depicted as Lot C in Survey Generals’ Tracing No. Ma/NUL/2009/36 containing in extent 0.3642 hectares	
Weheragala Raja Maha Vihara		Aliwanguwa	Aliwanguwa	Wilgamuwa	12 June 2015	Arama complex where archaeological evidences including places with ruins of buildings, hillocks of Chaityas, rock inscriptions, drip ledged caves, plight of steps, and stone basin for washing feet are scattered in the premises	
Weluwanarama Purana Vihara			Pallepola North	Pallepola	6 July 2007	Image House and Atuwa	
Wewalawewa Gallen Aranya Senasana		Wewalawewa	Wewalawewa	Dambulla	12 June 2015	Cave complex with drip ledges and stone inscriptions and other archaeological evidences at the premises	
