= Gurulawela South Grama Niladhari Division =

Gurulawela South
- Grama Niladhari Division
- Interactive map of Gurulawela South
- Coordinates: 7.411123°N 80.636755°E
- Country: Sri Lanka
- Province: Central Province
- District: Matale District
- Divisional Secretariat: Ukuwela Divisional Secretariat
- Electoral District: Matale Electoral District
- Polling Division: Rattota Polling Division

Area
  - Total: 0.85 km^{2} (0.33 sq mi)
- Elevation: 118 m (387 ft)

Population (2012)
  - Total: 640
  - Density: 753/km^{2} (1,950/sq mi)
- ISO 3166 code: LK-2233300

Gurulawela South

Gurulawela South Grama Niladhari Division is a Grama Niladhari Division of the Ukuwela Divisional Secretariat of Matale District of Central Province, Sri Lanka. It has Grama Niladhari Division Code E358A.

Paragahawela, Maberiya, Gurukete, Nitulgahakotuwa and Manaboda are located within, nearby or associated with Gurulawela South.

Gurulawela South is a surrounded by the Marukona, Kandemada, Nugapitiya, Ukuwela, Ulpathapitiya, Bowatta, Manaboda and Gurulawela North Grama Niladhari Divisions.

== Demographics ==
=== Ethnicity ===
The Gurulawela South Grama Niladhari Division has a Sinhalese majority (96.9%). In comparison, the Ukuwela Divisional Secretariat (which contains the Gurulawela South Grama Niladhari Division) has a Sinhalese majority (64.8%) and a significant Moor population (20.5%)

Ethnicity in Gurulawela South
1. Sinhalese (96.9%)
2. Indian Tamil (2.80%)
3. Other (0.30%)

=== Religion ===
The Gurulawela South Grama Niladhari Division has a Buddhist majority (96.7%). In comparison, the Ukuwela Divisional Secretariat (which contains the Gurulawela South Grama Niladhari Division) has a Buddhist majority (64.3%), a significant Muslim population (20.8%) and a significant Hindu population (13.1%)

Religion in Gurulawela South
1. Buddhist (96.7%)
2. Hindu (3.00%)
3. Other (0.30%)
