= Alupotawela =

- Village
- Location within Sri Lanka
- Coordinates: 7.3976°N 80.6586°E
- Country: Sri Lanka
- Province: Central Province
- District: Matale District
- Divisional secretariat: Ukuwela Divisional Secretariat
- Time zone: UTC+5:30 (Sri Lanka Standard Time)

Alupotawela is a village in Sri Lanka. It is a hamlet of Kaduwela, in Matale District of the Central Province.

== History ==
As of 1896, the inhabitants were "Tellas and Stone-cutters", and were masons to the King during the Kandyan period. A canal was cut was from Yatawara to Alupotawela during the reign of King Vijayapala of Matale.

== Demographics ==
Historical population
Year	Pop.	±%
1881	53	—
1891	85	+60.4%

== See also ==
- List of towns in Central Province, Sri Lanka
