= Alutgama =

Alutgama may refer to:

- Alutgama (Kandy District), a village in Akurana Divisional Secretariat, Kandy District, Central Province, Sri Lanka
- Alutgama (Yatawatta Divisional Secretariat, Matale District), a village in Yatawatta Divisional Secretariat, Matale District, Central Province, Sri Lanka
- Alutgama (Pallepola Divisional Secretariat, Matale District), a village in Pallepola Divisional Secretariat, Matale District, Central Province, Sri Lanka
