= Alutgama (Pallepola Divisional Secretariat, Matale District) =

Village in Sri Lanka

- Village
- Location within Sri Lanka
- Coordinates: 7°42′N 80°36′E
- Country: Sri Lanka
- Province: Central Province
- District: Matale District
- Divisional secretariat: Pallepola Divisional Secretariat
- Time zone: UTC+5:30 (Sri Lanka Standard Time)

Alutgama is a village in northern Matale District, Central Province, Sri Lanka. It is located on the road between Galewela and Palapathwela.

== History ==
The village population was recorded as "descendants of Brahmins, Moors, Washers, etc." in 1896.

== Demographics ==
Historical population
| Year | Pop. | ±% |
|---|---|---|
| 1881 | 136 | — |
| 1891 | 93 | −31.6% |

== See also ==
- List of towns in Central Province, Sri Lanka
