= Andagala =

Village in Sri Lanka

- Village
- Interactive map of Andagala
- Coordinates: 7°45′41.3″N 80°31′51.9″E
- Country: Sri Lanka
- Province: Central Province
- Time zone: UTC+5:30 (Sri Lanka Standard Time)

Andagala is a village in Galewela Town. It is located on Andagala - Polgahangoda road within Matale District, Central Province, Sri Lanka.

== See also ==
- List of towns in Central Province, Sri Lanka
