= Rathmalgaha Ela Grama Niladhari Division =

Rathmalgaha Ela
- Grama Niladhari Division
- Interactive map of Rathmalgaha Ela
- Coordinates: 7.847039°N 80.667257°E
- Country: Sri Lanka
- Province: Central Province
- District: Matale District
- Divisional Secretariat: Dambulla Divisional Secretariat
- Electoral District: Matale Electoral District
- Polling Division: Dambulla Polling Division

Area
  - Total: 6.77 km^{2} (2.61 sq mi)
- Elevation: 186 m (610 ft)

Population (2012)
  - Total: 2,433
  - Density: 359/km^{2} (930/sq mi)
- ISO 3166 code: LK-2206195

Rathmalgaha Ela

Rathmalgaha Ela Grama Niladhari Division is a Grama Niladhari Division of the Dambulla Divisional Secretariat of Matale District of Central Province, Sri Lanka. It has Grama Niladhari Division Code E445A.

Rathmalgaha Ela is a surrounded by the Athuparayaya, Dambulla Town, Kalogaha Ela, Thittawelgolla, Kapuwatta, Pahala Wewa, Yakkuragala South and Yapagama Grama Niladhari Divisions.

== Demographics ==
=== Ethnicity ===
The Rathmalgaha Ela Grama Niladhari Division has a Sinhalese majority (97.9%). In comparison, the Dambulla Divisional Secretariat (which contains the Rathmalgaha Ela Grama Niladhari Division) has a Sinhalese majority (95.9%)

Ethnicity in Rathmalgaha Ela
1. Sinhalese (97.9%)
2. Sri Lankan Tamil (1.70%)
3. Other (0.40%)

=== Religion ===
The Rathmalgaha Ela Grama Niladhari Division has a Buddhist majority (96.8%). In comparison, the Dambulla Divisional Secretariat (which contains the Rathmalgaha Ela Grama Niladhari Division) has a Buddhist majority (94.5%)

Religion in Rathmalgaha Ela
1. Buddhist (96.8%)
2. Hindu (2.00%)
3. Other (1.20%)
