= Alakolamada =

- Village
- Location within Sri Lanka
- Coordinates: 7°28′33″N 80°40′58″E
- Country: Sri Lanka
- Province: Central Province
- District: Matale District
- Divisional secretariat: Rattota Divisional Secretariat
- Time zone: UTC+5:30 (Sri Lanka Standard Time)

Alakolamada is a village in Matale District of Sri Lanka's Central Province. It is located near Maussagala, five miles east of the town of Matale.

== Demographics ==
Historical population
Year	Pop.	±%
1881	266	—
1891	257	−3.4%

== See also ==
- List of towns in Central Province, Sri Lanka
