= Kiralessa =

- Village
- Location in Sri Lanka
- Coordinates: 7°47′N 80°40′E
- Country: Sri Lanka
- Province: Central Province
- Time zone: UTC+5:30 (Sri Lanka Standard Time)

Kiralessa is a village in Sri Lanka. It is located within Central Province, 12 km south of Dambulla.

== See also ==
- List of towns in Central Province, Sri Lanka
