= Nalanda, Sri Lanka =

Village in Matale District, Sri Lanka

Nalanda
- Village
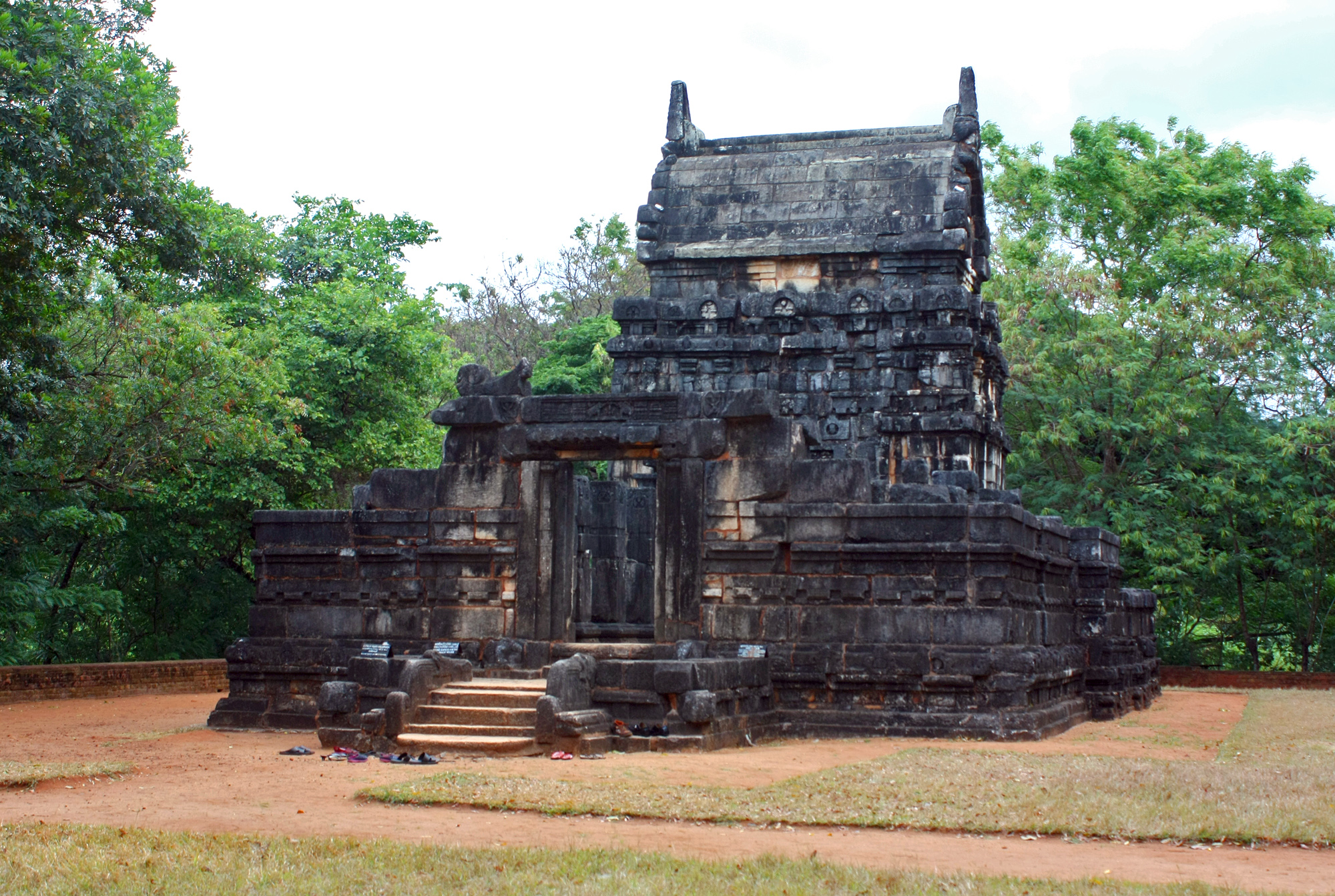
- Nalanda Gedige, 11th c.
- Interactive map of Nalanda
- Coordinates: 7°39′48″N 80°38′14″E
- Country: Sri Lanka
- Province: Central Province

Population (2019)
  - Total: 945
- Time zone: UTC+5:30 (Sri Lanka Standard Time)

Nalanda is a village in Sri Lanka. It is located within Matale District in Central Province. Nalanda Gedige, a stone temple which is considered the geographical centre of Sri Lanka is located in Nalanda Village. Nalanda is a Grama Niladhari Division in Naula Divisional Secretariat. Population of the village is 945 in 2019. Nalanda has a rest house operated by the Sri Lanka Tourism Development Authority.

== See also ==
- List of towns in Central Province, Sri Lanka
