= Akurambodwatta =

- Village
- Location within Sri Lanka
- Coordinates: 7°38′11″N 80°37′20″E
- Country: Sri Lanka
- Province: Central Province
- District: Matale District
- Time zone: UTC+5:30 (Sri Lanka Standard Time)

Akurambodwatta is a village located in Matale District of Sri Lanka's Central Province.

== See also ==
- List of towns in Central Province, Sri Lanka
