= Alubendiyaya =

- Village
- Location within Sri Lanka
- Coordinates: 7°46′00″N 80°40′00″E
- Country: Sri Lanka
- Province: Central Province
- District: Matale District
- Time zone: UTC+5:30 (Sri Lanka Standard Time)

Alubendiyaya is a village in Matale District, which lies in Sri Lanka's Central Province.

== See also ==
- List of towns in Central Province, Sri Lanka
