= Alakagama =

- Village
- Location within Sri Lanka
- Coordinates: 7°33′17″N 80°34′45″E
- Country: Sri Lanka
- Province: Central Province
- District: Matale District
- Time zone: UTC+5:30 (Sri Lanka Standard Time)

Alakagama is a village located in Matale District in Central Province, Sri Lanka.

== See also ==
- List of towns in Central Province, Sri Lanka
