= Alhentennawatta =

- Village
- Location within Sri Lanka
- Coordinates: 7°33′55″N 80°39′03″E
- Country: Sri Lanka
- Province: Central Province
- District: Matale District
- Time zone: UTC+5:30 (Sri Lanka Standard Time)

Alhentennawatta is a village in Matale District, which is located in Sri Lanka's Central Province.

== See also ==
- List of towns in Central Province, Sri Lanka
