= Alugolla, Matale District =

Village in Sri Lanka

Alugolla
- Village
- Location within Sri Lanka
- Coordinates: 7°40′26″N 80°38′00″E
- Country: Sri Lanka
- Province: Central Province
- District: Matale District
- Time zone: UTC+5:30 (Sri Lanka Standard Time)

Alugolla is a village in Sri Lanka. It is located within Central Province.

== See also ==
- List of towns in Central Province, Sri Lanka
