= Aluvihare Colony =

- Village
- Location within Sri Lanka
- Coordinates: 7°30′09″N 80°37′02″E
- Country: Sri Lanka
- Province: Central Province
- District: Matale District
- Time zone: UTC+5:30 (Sri Lanka Standard Time)

Aluvihare Colony is a village in Sri Lanka. It is located within Central Province's Matale District.

== See also ==
- List of towns in Central Province, Sri Lanka
