= Alutgama (Yatawatta Divisional Secretariat, Matale District) =

Village in Sri Lanka

- Village
- Location within Sri Lanka
- Coordinates: 7°32′08″N 80°35′38″E
- Country: Sri Lanka
- Province: Central Province
- District: Matale District
- Divisional secretariat: Yatawatta Divisional Secretariat
- Time zone: UTC+5:30 (Sri Lanka Standard Time)

Alutgama is a village in Matale District, Central Province, Sri Lanka. It is located south from Yatawatta and north of Matale.

== History ==
A historic vihāra is located in Alutgama. The village inhabitants were "Vellalas, Fishers, Hangarammu, Blacksmiths, [and] Tamils", as recorded in Archibald Campbell Lawrie's 1896 gazetteer of the province. Low-country Sinhalese and Moormen were also recorded to own land.

== Demographics ==
Historical population
Year	Pop.	±%
1881	217	—
1891	185	−14.7%

== See also ==
- List of towns in Central Province, Sri Lanka
