= Maligatenna =

Maligatenna மாளிகாதென்ன Janaudhana Gammana
- Village
- Location within Sri Lanka
- Coordinates: 7°33′48.5″N 80°33′45.1″E
- Country: Sri Lanka
- Province: Central Province
- Districts of Sri Lanka: Matale
- Divisional Secretariats of Sri Lanka: Yatawatta Divisional Secretariat
- Division: Maligatenna

Government
  - Type: Municipal Council
  - Body: Matale Municipal Council

Language
  - Official: Tamil and Sinhala

Language
  - Additional: English
- Time zone: UTC+5:30 (Sri Lanka Standard Time)
- post code: 21056

Maligatenna (Tamil: மாளிகாதென்ன) is a village in Sri Lanka. It is located within Yatawatta Divisional Secretariat, Matale District, Central Province, Sri Lanka.

== See also ==
- List of settlements in Central Province (Sri Lanka)
