= Alwatta =

- Village
- Location within Sri Lanka
- Coordinates: 7°26′36″N 80°39′43″E
- Country: Sri Lanka
- Province: Central Province
- District: Matale District
- Time zone: UTC+5:30 (Sri Lanka Standard Time)

Alwatta is a village in Sri Lanka. It is located within Matale District, in Central Province.

== See also ==
- List of towns in Central Province, Sri Lanka
