= Kandalama =

- Village
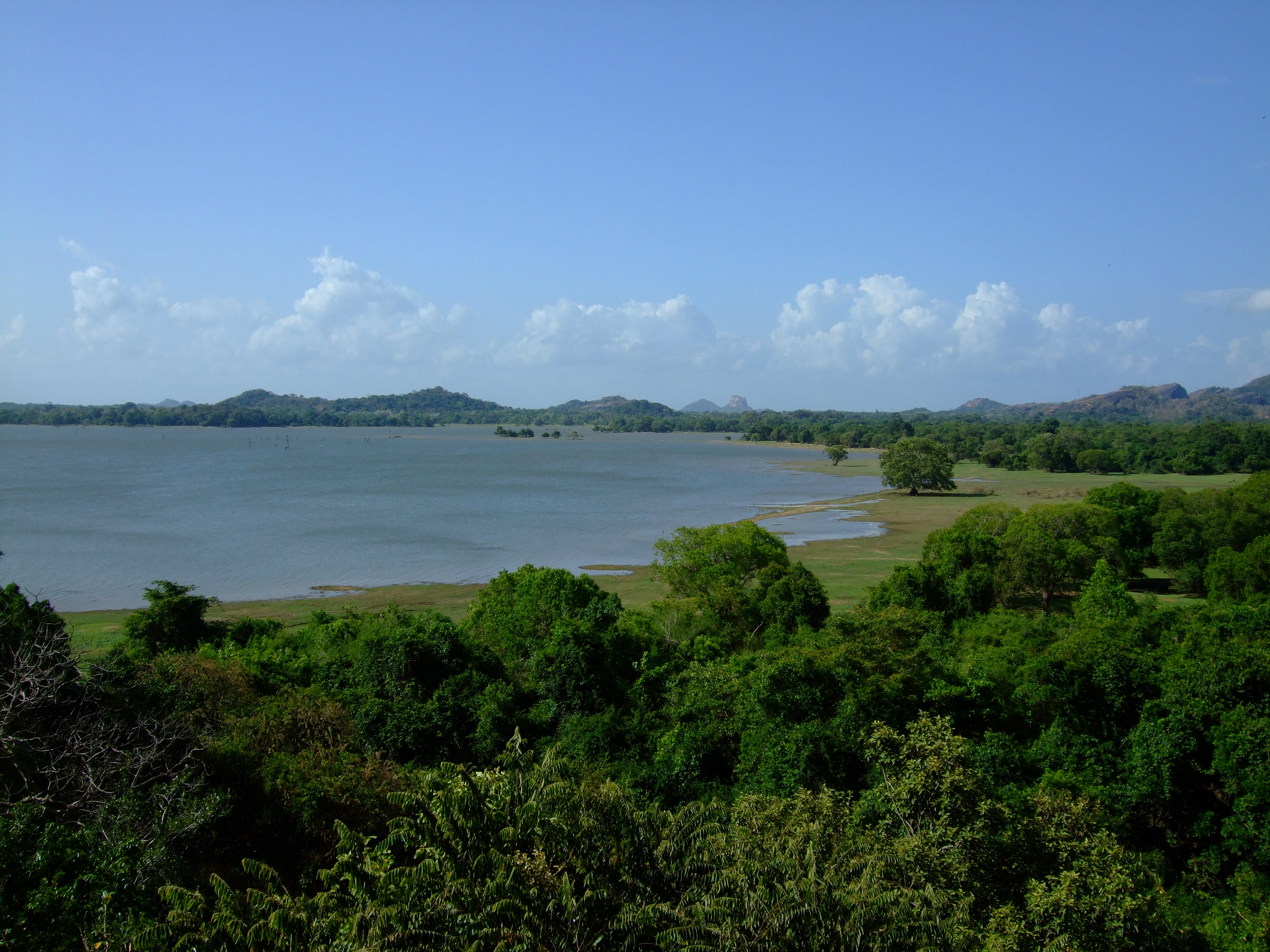
- Kandalama Reservoir
- Interactive map of Kandalama
- Coordinates: 7°53′42″N 80°42′21″E
- Country: Sri Lanka
- Province: Central Province
- District: Matale District

Area
  - Total: 21 km^{2} (8.1 sq mi)
- Elevation: 158 m (518 ft)

Population
  - Total: 2,269
- Time zone: UTC+5:30 (Sri Lanka Standard Time)
- Postal code: 21106
- Area code: 066

Kandalama is a village in the Central Province of Sri Lanka. It is located 7 km (4.3 mi) north of Dambulla and 140 km (87 mi) northeast of Colombo.

Kandalama is home to the Kaludiya Pokuna Archeological Forest, Kandalama Reservoir, and the Heritance Kandalama hotel.

Nestling at the foot of Ereulagala (696 m (2,283 ft) above Mean sea level (MSL) and Dikkandahena (618 m (2,028 ft) above MSL, the village is situated at the northern end of the Matale hills, and the beginning of the dry plains. The village lies on the border of the intermediate and dry zones of Sri Lanka.

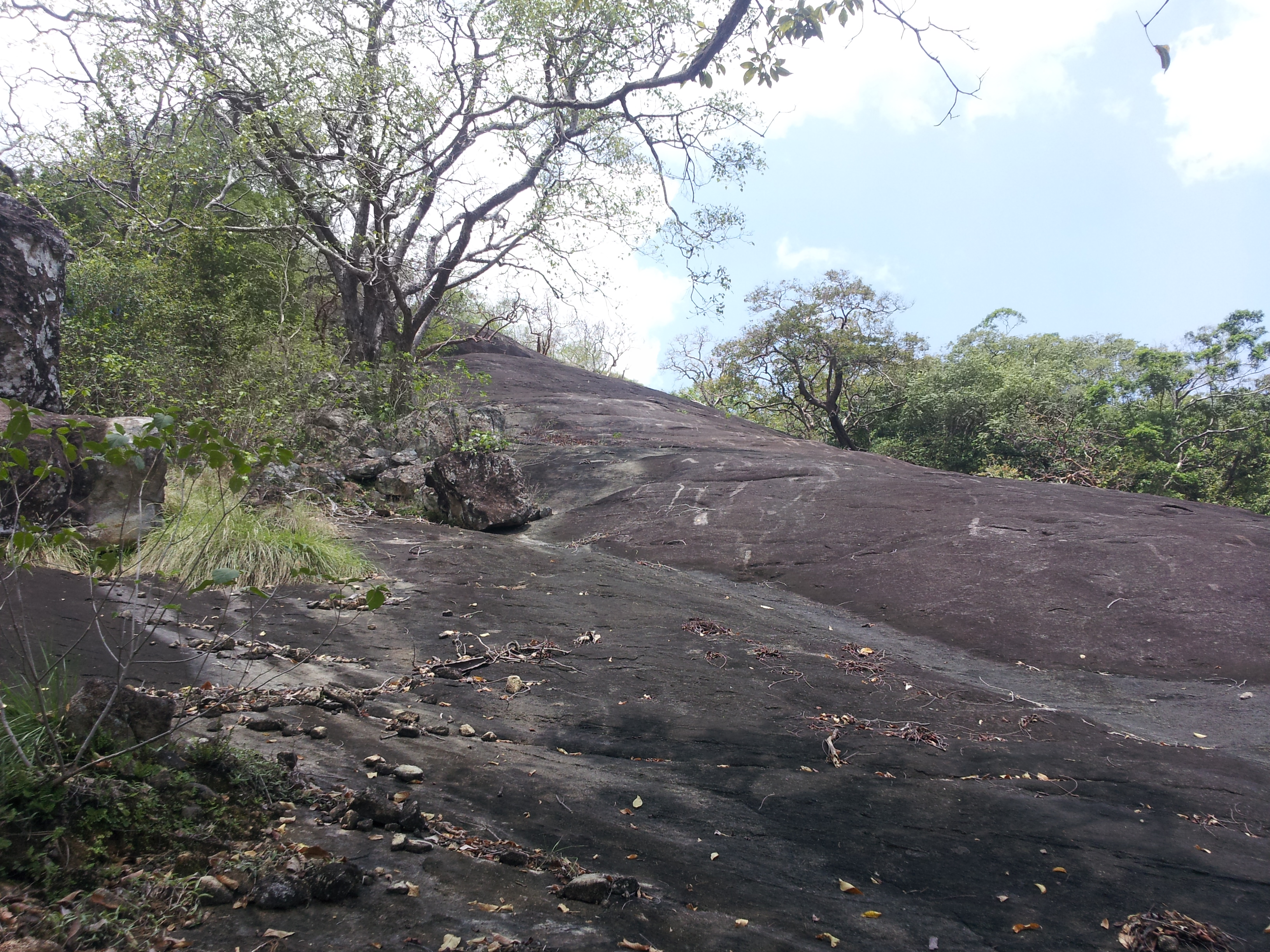
Kaludiya Pokuna Forest at Kandalama

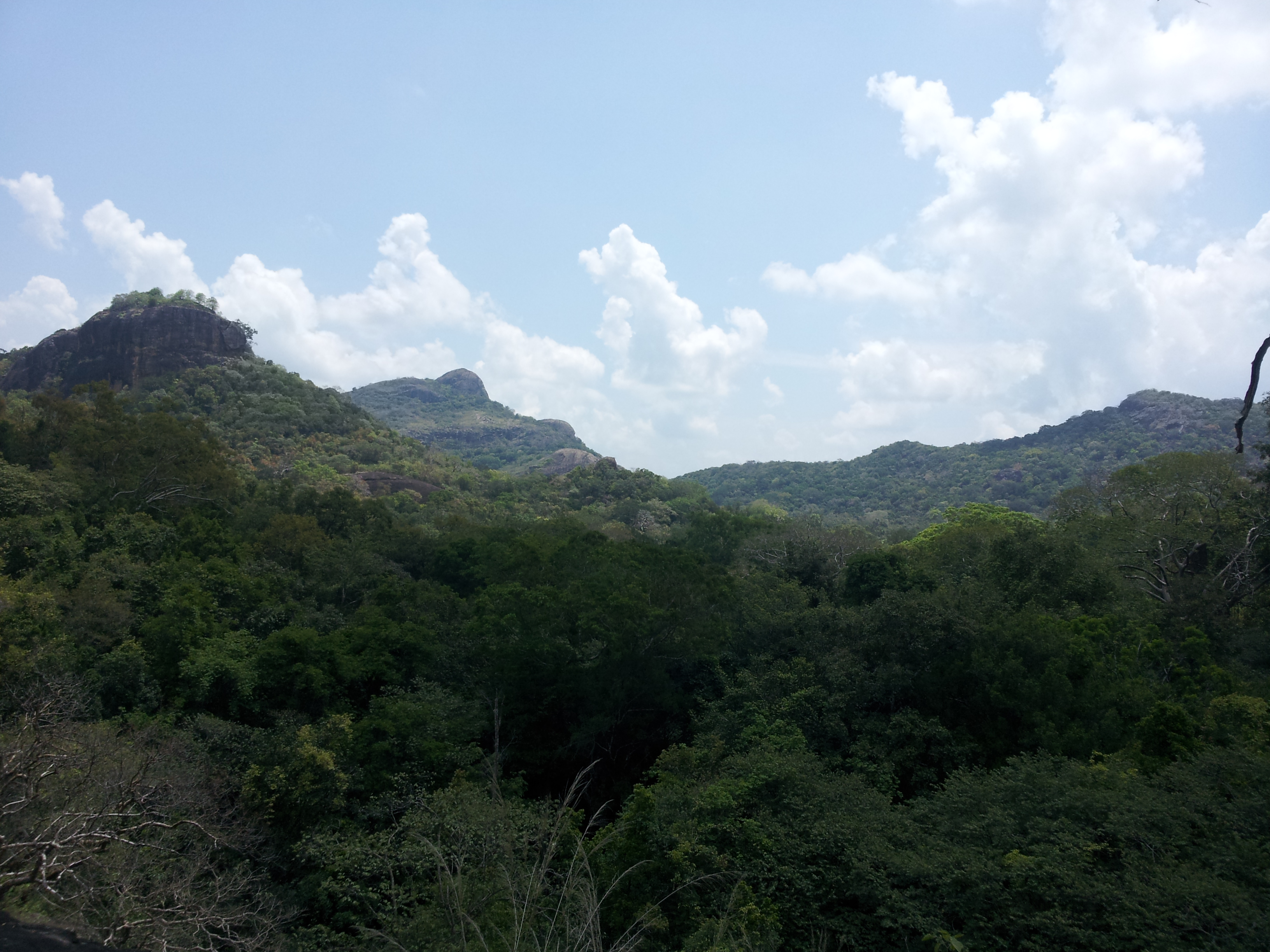
Kandalama forest in at Kaludiya Pokuna

== See also ==
- List of towns in Central Province, Sri Lanka
