= Pallepola =

- Village
- Location within Sri Lanka
- Coordinates: 7°37′24.1″N 80°36′23.5″E
- Country: Sri Lanka
- Province: Central Province
- Elevation: 1,273 ft (388 m)
- Time zone: UTC+5:30 (Sri Lanka Standard Time)

Pallepola is a small town in Sri Lanka. It is located within Matale district, Central Province.

== See also ==
- List of towns in Central Province, Sri Lanka
