= Paragahawela =

Paragahawela පරගහාවේල பறகாஹாவெல
- Village
- Interactive map of Paragahawela
- Coordinates: 7°25′19.7″N 80°38′30.8″E
- Country: Sri Lanka
- Province: Central Province
- Elevation: 370 m (1,210 ft)

Population
  - Total: 2,168
- Time zone: UTC+5:30 (Sri Lanka Standard Time)

Paragahawela is a village in Sri Lanka. It is located within Matale District, Central Province. It is located in Ukuwela-Elkaduwa road (B180) about 1 kilometer from Ukuwela. The population of the village, according to the 2012 census, was 2,168.

== Demographics ==
The majority of the people living in Paragahawela are Muslims. Tamil is the major language spoken in Paragahawela by the majority of the population.

== Local Government Council ==
Paragahawela is governed by the Ukuwela Pradeshiya Sabha.

== See also ==
- List of towns in Central Province, Sri Lanka
