= Kaduwela, Central Province =

Kaduwela කඩුවෙල
- Village
- Location within Sri Lanka
- Coordinates: 7°23′49.5″N 80°39′35.0″E
- Country: Sri Lanka
- Province: Central Province
- District: Matale District
- Pradeshiya Sabha: Ukuwela Pradeshiya Sabha
- Time zone: UTC+5:30 (Sri Lanka Standard Time)

Kaduwela (Sinhala: කඩුවෙල) is a village in the Matale District, Central Province of Sri Lanka.

== See also ==
- List of towns in Central Province, Sri Lanka
