= Wilgamuwa Divisional Secretariat =

Wilgamuwa Divisional Secretariat CFGG
- Divisional Secretariat
- Country: Sri Lanka
- Province: Central Province
- District: Matale District
- Time zone: UTC+5:30 (Sri Lanka Standard Time)

Wilgamuwa Divisional Secretariat is a Divisional Secretariat of the Matale District, of Central Province, Sri Lanka.

== Demography-Religion ==
Religion in Wilgamuwa DS Division (2012)
1. Buddhist (99.8%)
2. Hindu (0.00%)
3. Muslim (0.00%)
4. Roman Catholic (0.10%)
5. Other Christian (0.10%)
6. Other (0.00%)
