= Ibbankatuwa Megalithic Tombs =

Ancient burial site in Sri Lanka

Coordinates: 7°50′14.1″N 80°37′47.6″E

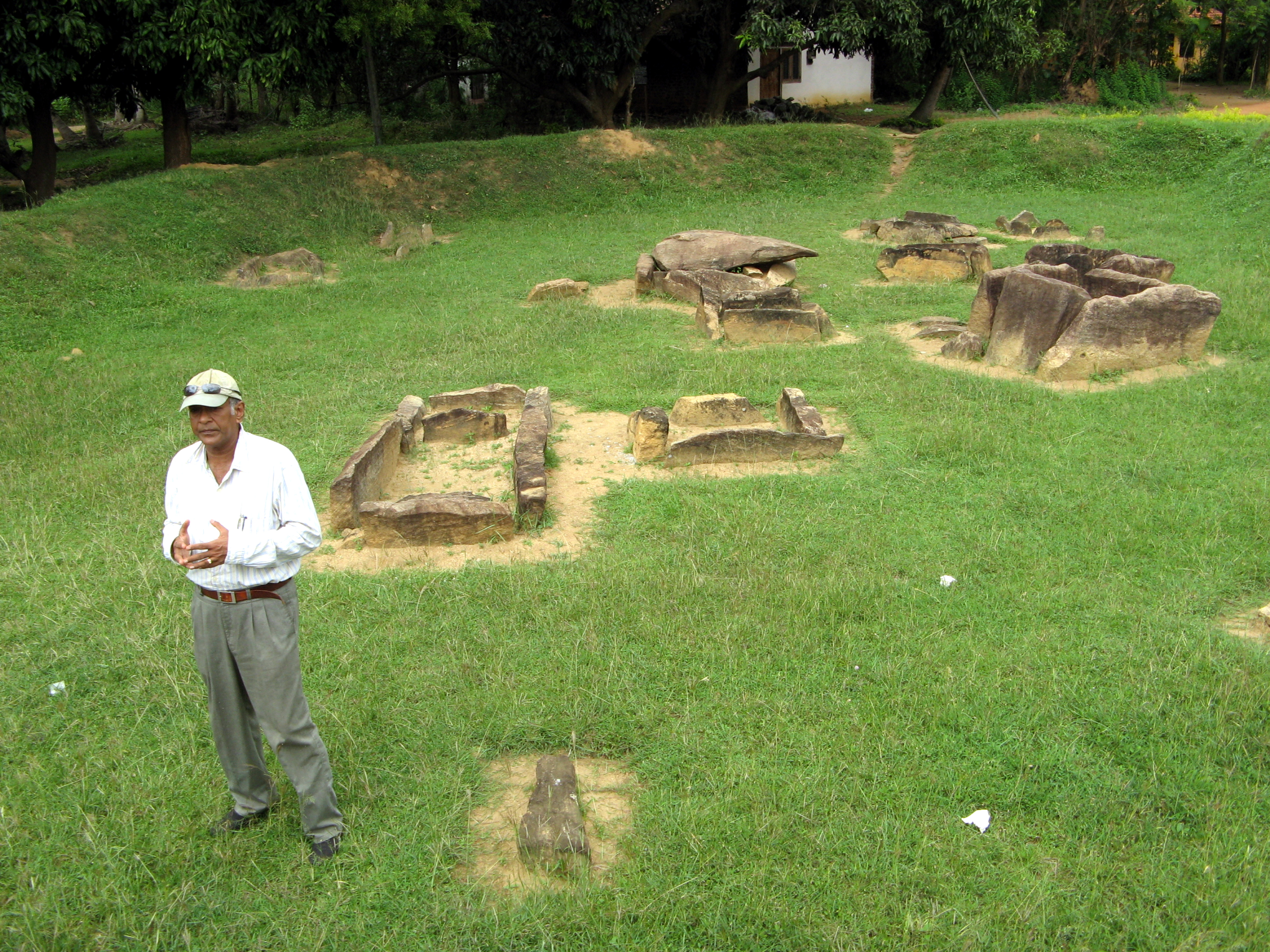

The Ibbankatuwa Megalithic Tombs (Sinhala: ඉබ්බන්කටුව මෙගාලිතික සුසාන) is an ancient burial site located near Ibbankatuwa Wewa in Galewela DS, Sri Lanka. The site is thought to belong to the megalithic prehistoric and protohistoric periods of Sri Lanka and is considered one of the several ancient burial sites that have been found in the country. The site is situated on the Kurunegala - Dambulla road approximately five kilometers southwest of Dambulla town. Currently, the tomb site has been designated an archaeological protected site in Sri Lanka.

== Discovery and excavation ==
The prehistoric period of Sri Lanka ranges from 125,000 – 2,400 BC. The transition period between the end of the prehistoric period and the commencement of the historic period is known as the protohistoric period. The Ibbankatuwa tomb site was first identified in 1970 by the Archaeological Department. Radiocarbon dating carried out on remains found at the site have revealed that these tombs date back to 700 – 450 B.C. Subsequently, a number of archaeological excavations were carried out in 1983–1984 and again between 1988 and 1990.

== Ancient Settlement ==
The ancient Ibbankatuwa settlement is located about 150 m (490 ft) southwest of the Dambulu Oya river and approximately 200 m (660 ft) east of the eastern edge of the cemetery. The site is approximately 6 ha (15 acres) in size. The first excavation was done in 1988 and then in 1989, 1990 and 1991.

== Tombs ==
The tomb complex covers an area of about 1 km^{2} (0.39 sq mi) with 42 clusters of tombs and each cluster contains about 10 tombs. Each tomb is enclosed with four stone slabs and covered by another slab on top. According to the way of interment, two distinct burial customs, urn (bodies were placed in urns and interred) and cist (ashes of deceased were interred) have been identified.

Cremated remains along with grave goods and tools used by deceased, have been found at the site in large terra-cotta urns and cists as well as in the area between the cists. The finds include variety of clay pots, iron, copper and gold artifacts, beads, necklaces, etc. The gemstones found in some necklaces are not naturally found in Sri Lanka, indicating that they may have been imported.
