= Dambulla cave temple =

UNESCO World Heritage Site in Matale District, Sri Lanka

- දඹුල්ල රජ මහා විහාරය
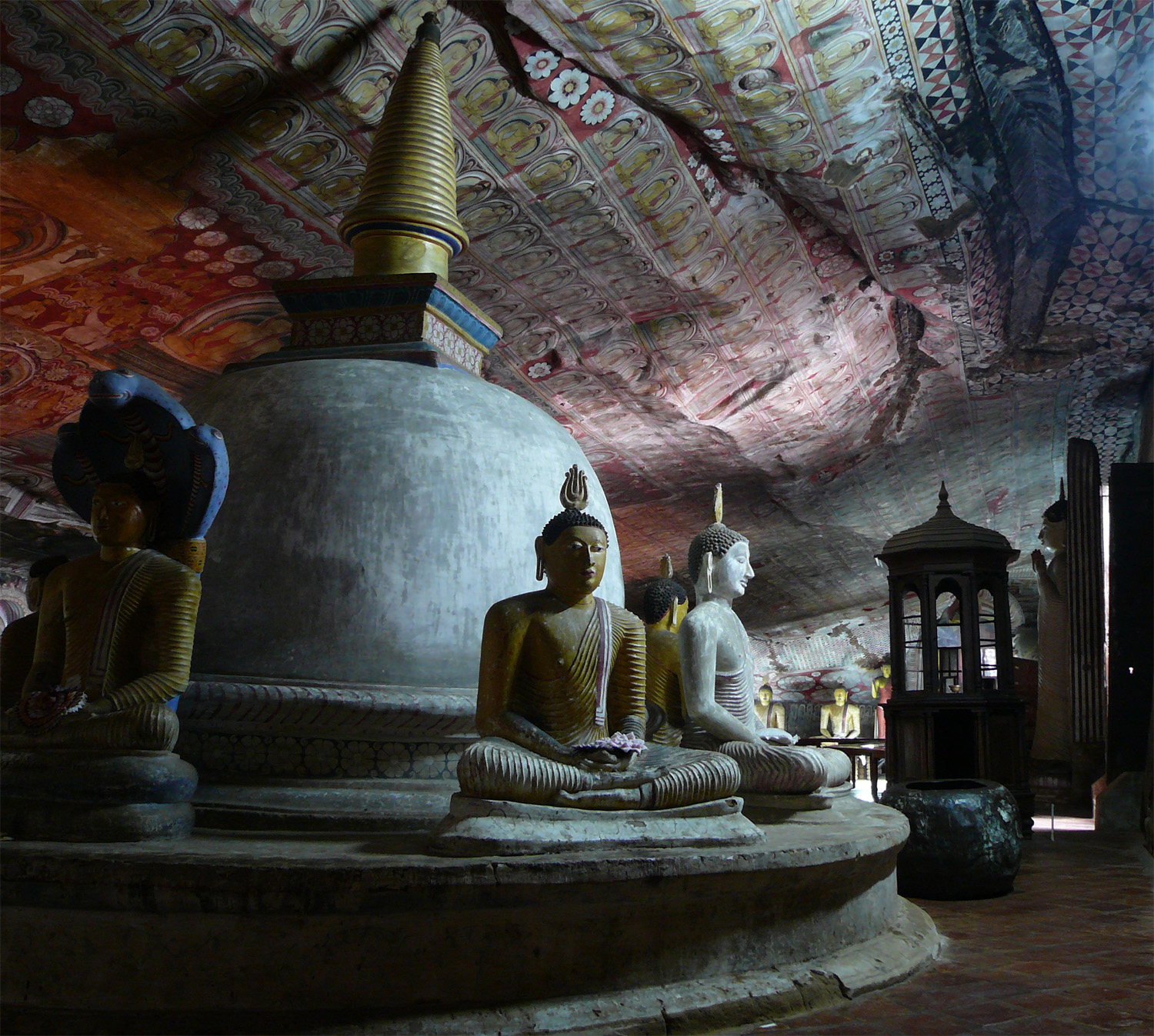

- Location within Sri Lanka

Religion
- Affiliation: Buddhism
- District: Matale
- Province: Central Province

Location
- Location: Dambulla
- Country: Sri Lanka
- Interactive map of Dambulla cave temple
- Coordinates: 7°51′24″N 80°38′57″E

Architecture
- Type: Cave Temple
- UNESCO World Heritage Site
- Official name: Rangiri Dambulla Cave Temple
- Criteria: Cultural: (i), (vi)
- Designated: 1991
- Reference no.: 561
- Archaeological Protected Monument of Sri Lanka
- Designated: 30 August 1957

Dambulla cave temple (Sinhala: දඹුල්ල රජ මහා විහාරය, romanized: Dam̆būlla Raja Maha Vihāraya; Tamil: தம்புள்ளை பொற்கோவில், romanized: Tampuḷḷai Poṟkōvil), also known as the Golden Temple of Dambulla, is a World Heritage Site (1991) in Sri Lanka, situated in the central part of the country. This site is situated 148 kilometres (92 mi) east of Colombo, 72 kilometres (45 mi) north of Kandy and 43 kilometres (27 mi) north of Matale.

Dambulla is the largest and best-preserved cave temple complex in Sri Lanka. The rock towers 160 m (520 ft) over the surrounding plains. There are more than eighty documented caves in the surrounding area. Major attractions are spread over five caves, which contain statues and paintings. These paintings and statues are related to Gautama Buddha and his life. There are a total of 153 Buddha statues, three statues of Sri Lankan kings and four statues of gods and goddesses. The latter include Vishnu and the Ganesha. The murals cover an area of 2,100 square metres (23,000 sq ft). Depictions on the walls of the caves include the temptation by the demon Mara, and Buddha's first sermon.

Prehistoric Sri Lankans would have lived in these cave complexes before the arrival of Buddhism in Sri Lanka as there are burial sites with human skeletons about 2700 years old in this area, at Ibbankatuwa near the Dambulla cave complexes.

== History ==
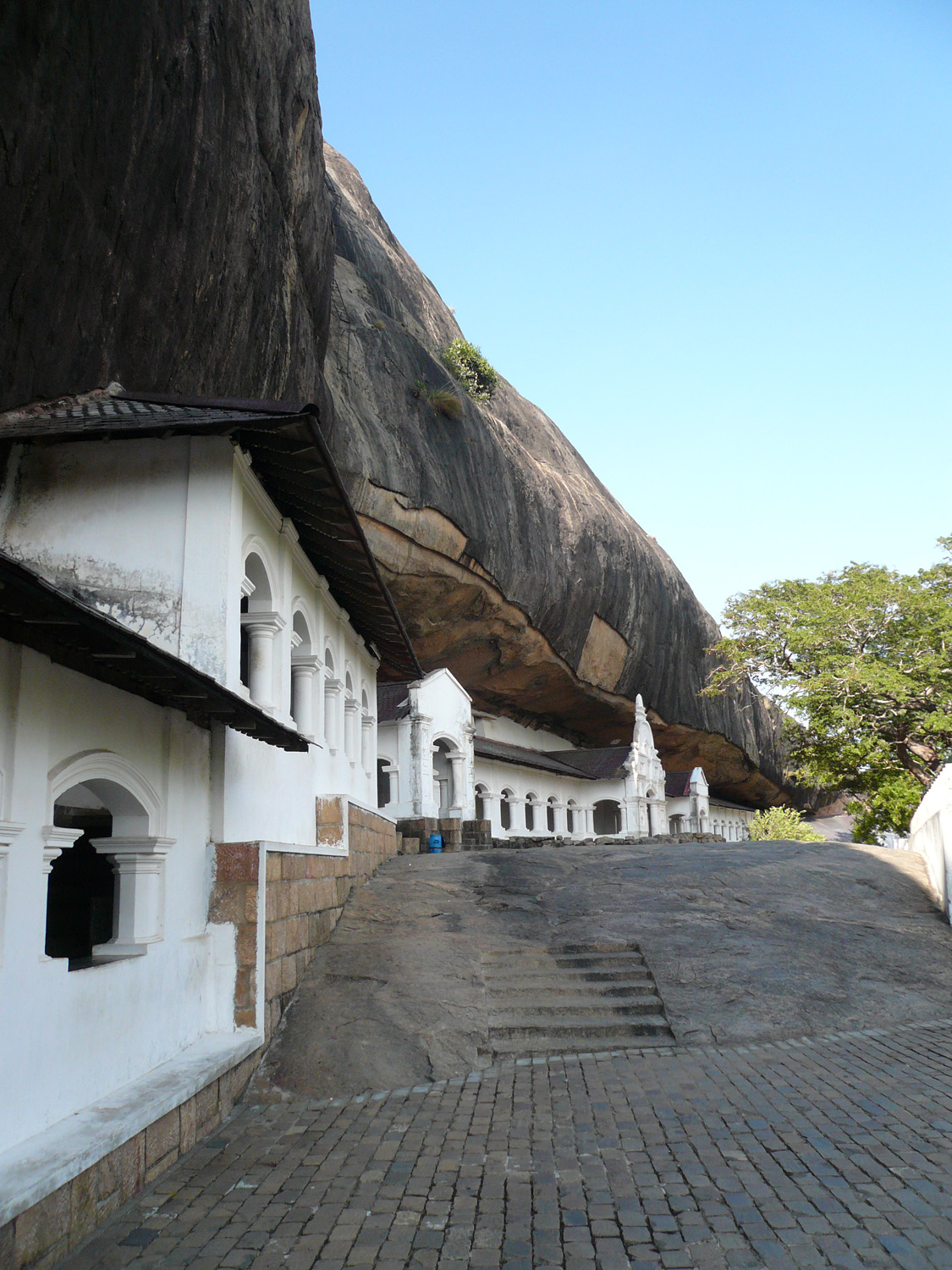
View of Dambulla

This temple complex dates back to the first century BCE. It has five caves under a vast overhanging rock, carved with a drip line to keep the interiors dry. In 1938 the architecture was embellished with arched colonnades and gabled entrances. Inside the caves, the ceilings are painted with intricate patterns of religious images following the contours of the rock. There are images of the Lord Buddha and bodhisattvas, as well as various gods and goddesses.

The Dambulla cave monastery is still functional and remains the best-preserved ancient edifice in Sri Lanka. This complex dates from the third and second centuries BC, when it was already established as one of the largest and most important monasteries. Valagamba of Anuradhapura is traditionally thought to have converted the caves into a temple in the first century BC. Exiled from Anuradhapura, he sought refuge here from South Indian usurpers for 15 years. After reclaiming his capital, the King built a temple in thankful worship. Many other kings added to it later and by the 11th century, the caves had become a major religious centre and still are. Nissanka Malla of Polonnaruwa gilded the caves and added about 70 Buddha statues in 1190. During the 18th century, the caves were restored and painted by the Kingdom of Kandy.

== The five caves ==
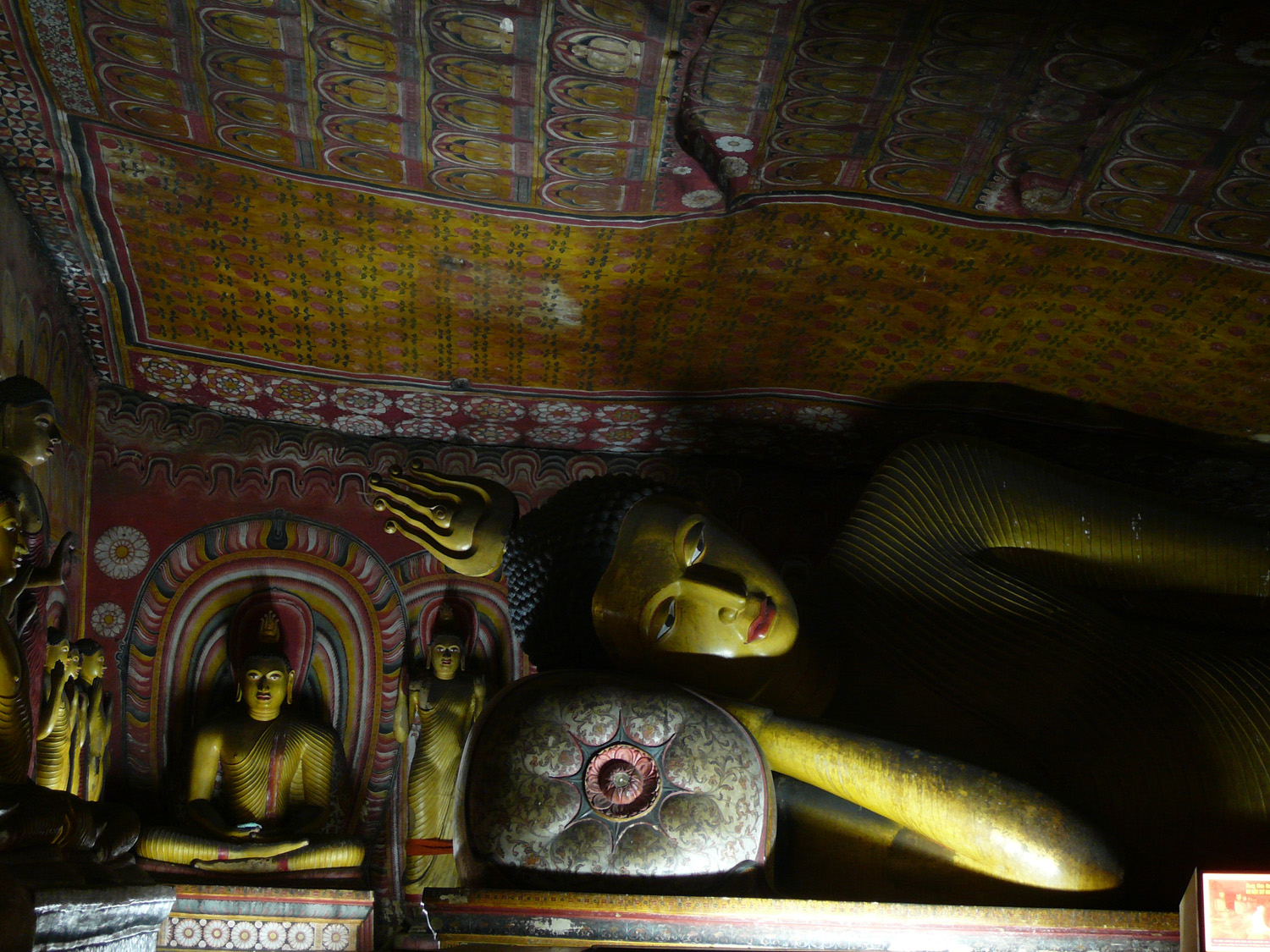
Dambulla-buddha

The temple is composed of five caves of varying sizes and magnificence. The caves, built at the base of a 150m high rock during the Anuradhapura (1st century BC to 993 AD) and Polonnaruwa times (1073 to 1250), are by far the most impressive of the many cave temples found in Sri Lanka. Access is along the gentle slope of the Dambulla Rock, offering a panoramic view of the surrounding flat lands, which includes the rock fortress Sigiriya, 19 km away. Dusk brings hundreds of swooping swallows to the cave entrance. The largest cave measures about 52m from east to west, and 23m from the entrance to the back, this spectacular cave is 7m tall at its highest point. Hindu deities are also represented here, as are the kings Valagamba and Nissankamalla, and Ananda - the Buddha's most devoted disciple.

=== Cave of the Divine King ===
The first cave is called Devaraja lena (lena in Sinhalese meaning cave), or "Cave of the Divine King." An account of the founding of the monastery is recorded in a 1st-century Brahmi inscription over the entrance to the first cave. This cave is dominated by the 14-meter statue of the Buddha, hewn out of the rock. It has been repainted countless times in the course of its history, and probably received its last coat of paint in the 20th century. At his feet is Buddha's favourite pupil, Ananda; at his head, Vishnu, said to have used his divine powers to create the caves.

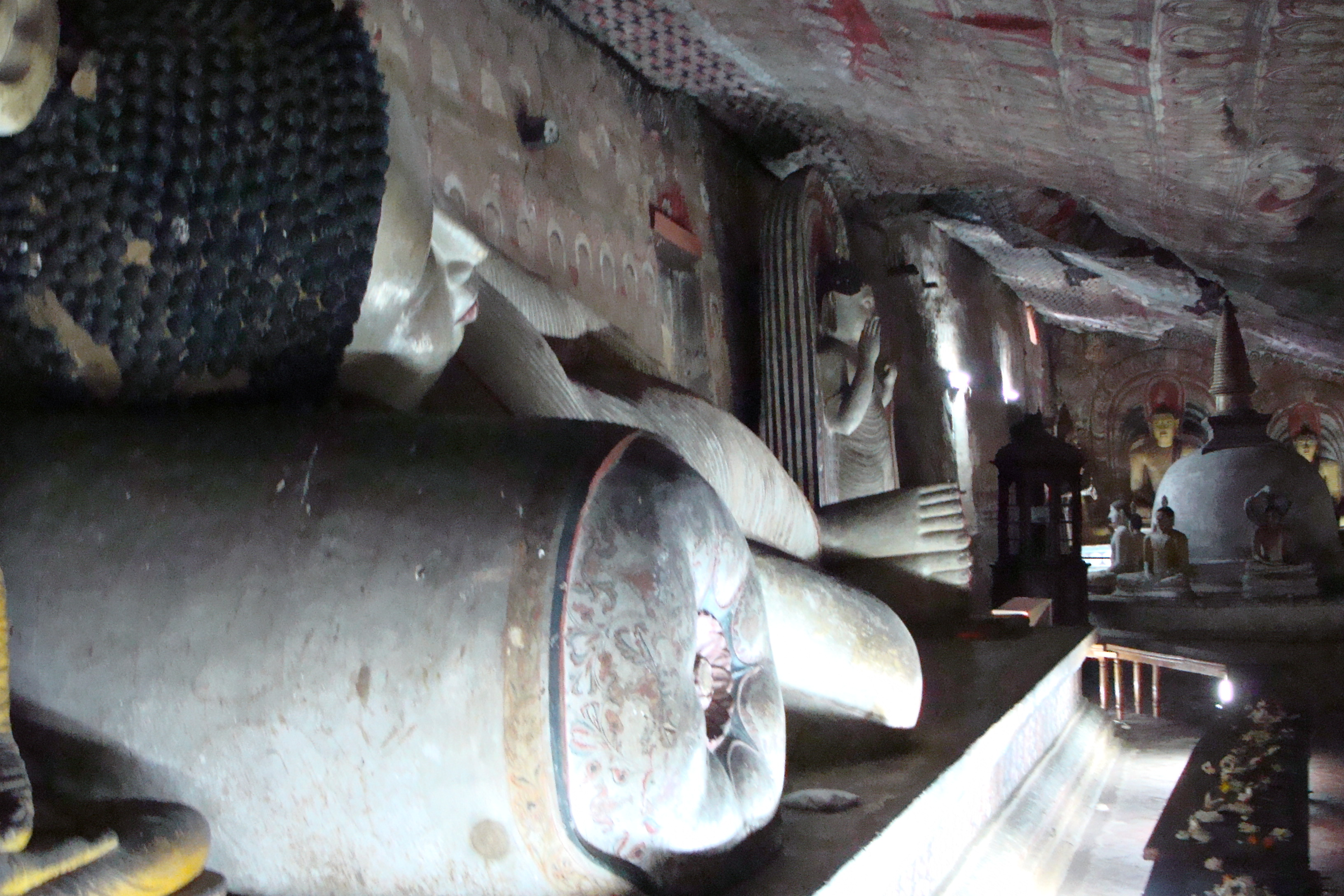
Golden temple of Dambula

=== Cave of the Great Kings ===
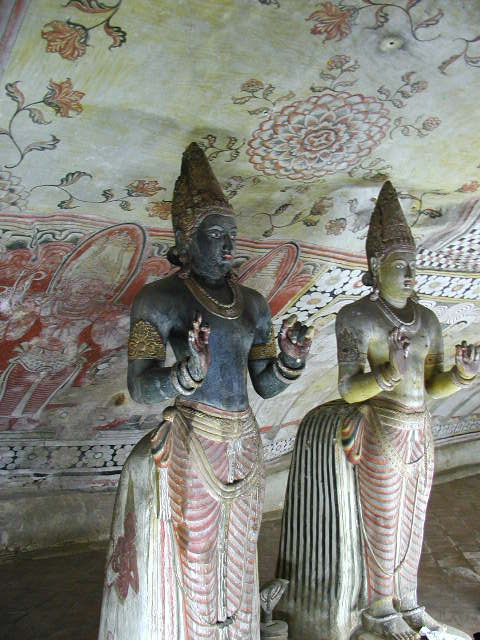
Dhambulla Cave Interior

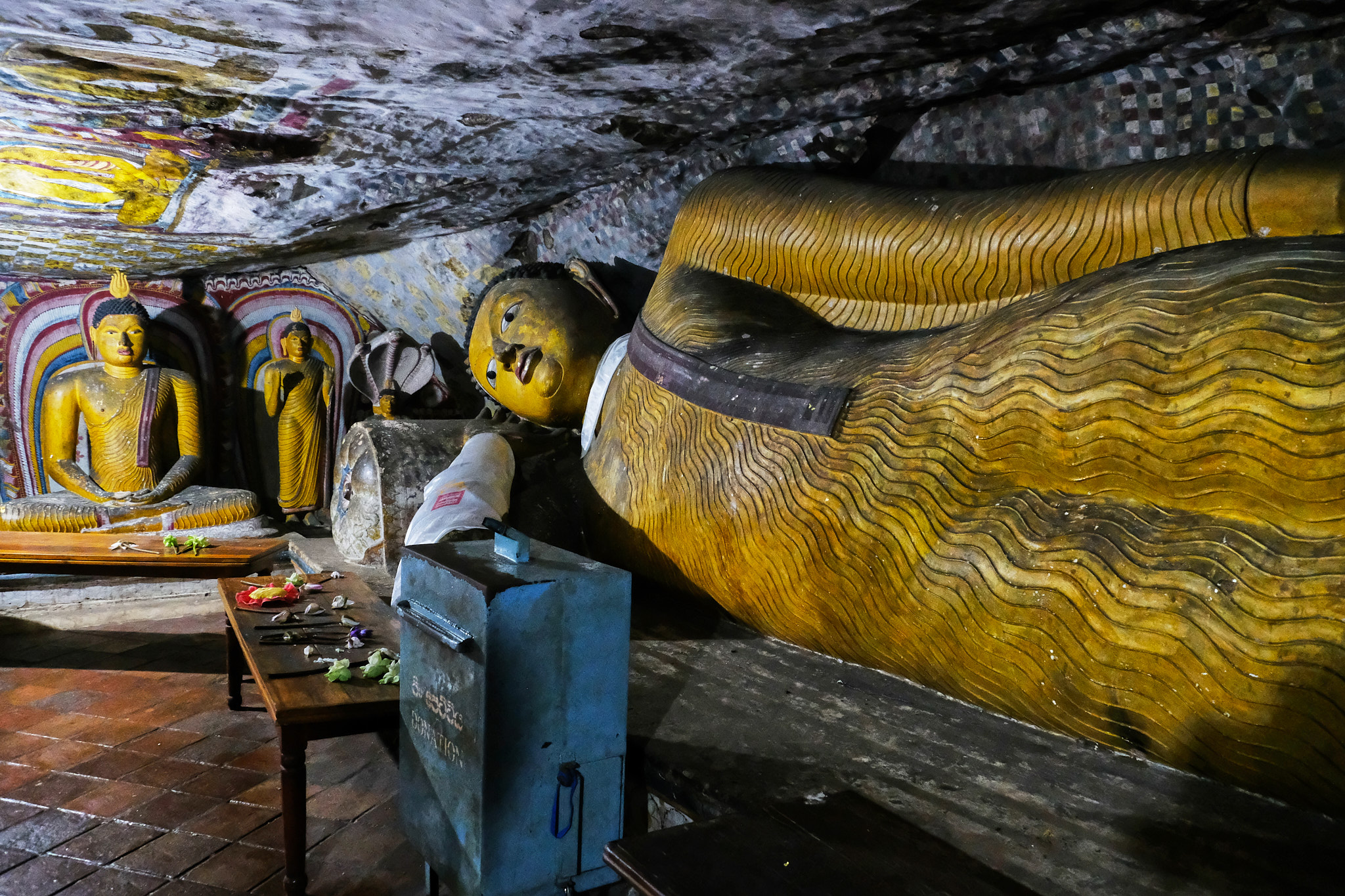
Statue of Sleeping Buddha inside Cave 5

In the second and largest cave, in addition to 16 standing and 40 seated statues of Buddha, are the gods Saman and Vishnu, which pilgrims often decorate with garlands, and finally, statues of King Vattagamani Abhaya, who honoured the monastery in the 1st century BC., and King Nissanka Malla, responsible in the 12th century for the gilding of 50 statues, as indicated by a stone inscription near the monastery entrance. This cave is accordingly called Maharaja lena, "Cave of the Great Kings." The Buddha statue hewn out of the rock on the left side of the room is escorted by wooden figures of the Bodhisattvas Maitreya and Avalokiteshvara or Natha. There is also a dagoba and a spring which drips its water said to have healing powers, out of a crack in the ceiling. Distinctive tempera paintings on the cave ceiling dating from the 18th century depict scenes from Buddha's life, from the dream of Mahamaya to temptation by the demon Mara. Further pictures relate important events from the country's history.

=== Great New Monastery ===
The third cave, the Maha Alut Vihara, the "Great New Monastery" acquired ceiling and wall paintings in the typical Kandy style during the reign of King Kirti Sri Rajasinha (1747–1782), the famous Buddhist revivalist. In addition to the 50 Buddha statues, there is also a statue of the king.

== Statues ==
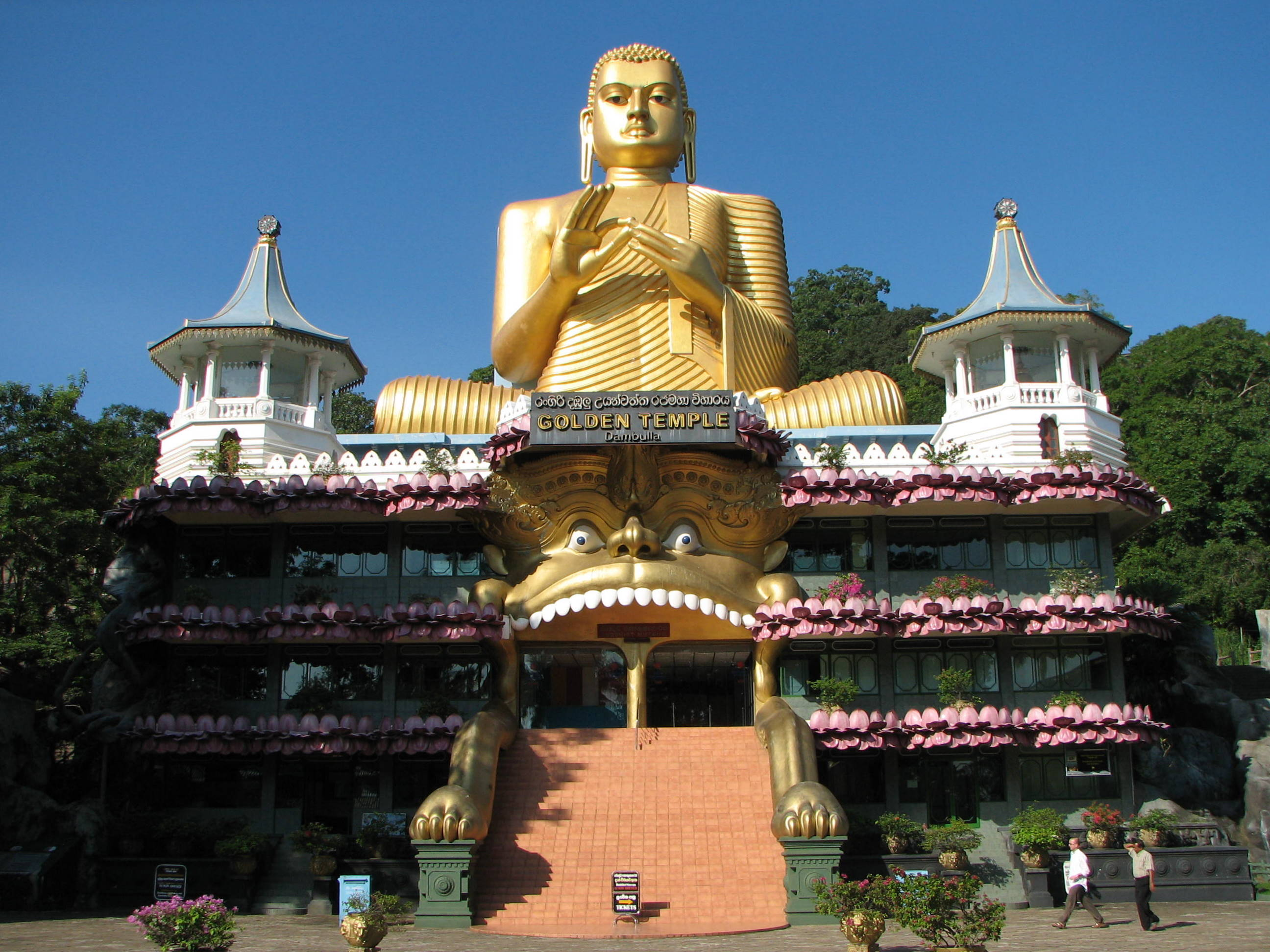
The Golden Buddha statue, Dambulla golden temple, just downhill from the Cave temple.

The shrine rooms are representative of many epochs of Sinhala sculpture and Sinhala art. The Buddha statues are in varying sizes and attitudes - the largest is 15 meters long. One cave has over 1,500 paintings of Buddha covering the ceiling.

== Conservation ==
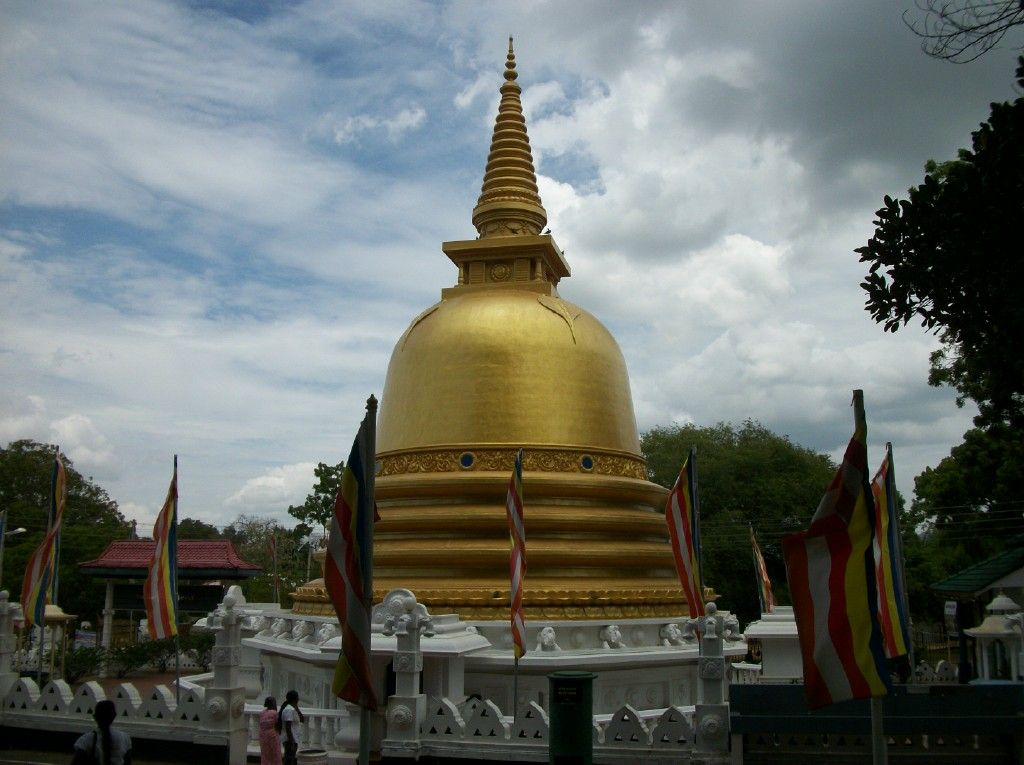
A pagoda at Dambulla golden temple

Conservation at the Dambulla Temple Complex has primarily concentrated on the preservation of its mural schemes. Senake Bandaranayake reports that the schemes were cleaned during an initial conservation project during the 1960s which involved the cleaning of the murals and the application of a protective coating.

Subsequent conservation strategies at the Dambulla Temple Complex (mainly since 1982) have focussed on maintaining the integrity of the existing complex which has remained unaltered since the reconstruction of the temple veranda in the 1930s. This strategy was agreed upon during a collaborative project between UNESCO, The Cultural Triangle Project of Sri Lanka and the Temple Authorities of Dambulla which ran from 1982 to 1996.

As the Dambulla Temple remains an active ritual centre, the conservation plans of the 1982-1996 project were directed at improving the infrastructure and accessibility of the site in accordance with its UNESCO World Heritage status. This involved the renovation of hand-cut paving within the complex and the installation of modern lighting. Further investment in the Temple's infrastructure has seen the construction of a museum and other tourist facilities located away from the historical complex.

More recent inspections by UNESCO in 2003 have proposed an expansion to the existing protected zone around the complex in order to minimise damage to surrounding archaeological features.

The conservation project undertaken between 1982 and 1996 focussed mainly on the preservation of the eighteenth-century mural schemes which represent around 80% of the total surviving paintings at Dambulla. By the late 1990s, the majority of these schemes remained in excellent condition, with the schemes of the larger shrines (Vihara 3 and Vihara 2) still retaining most of their eighteenth-century features.

Cleaning was not undertaken during the 1982-1996 project which instead focussed on the implementation of a series of remedial measures to stabilise the murals as well as developing a long-term conservation strategy to minimise further human or environmental damage.
