= Laggala-Pallegama Divisional Secretariat =

- Divisional Secretariat
- Country: Sri Lanka
- Province: Central Province
- District: Matale District
- Time zone: UTC+5:30 (Sri Lanka Standard Time)

Laggala-Pallegama Divisional Secretariat is a Divisional Secretariat of Matale District, of Central Province, Sri Lanka.

== Demography-Religion ==
Religion in Laggala-Pallegama DS Division (2012)
1. Buddhist (98.2%)
2. Hindu (1.70%)
3. Muslim (0.00%)
4. Roman Catholic (0.00%)
5. Other Christian (0.00%)
6. Other (0.00%)
