= Pitawala Pathana =

Coordinates: 7°33′00″N 80°45′17″E

Pitawala Pathana is a unique grassland found in the Knuckles Conservation Forest, Sri Lanka. This pathana has a great ecological value.

== Location ==
This grassland is situated by the side of the Rattota - Illukkumbura road in Matale district.

== Features ==
In Pitawala Pathana a grass cover spreads over an area of about 1000 acres of a gently sloping rock slab covered with just a thin soil layer. The turf grass of about 10 cm in height gives a velvety appearance to this sloping expanse of grassland. Isolated and scattered trees and shrubs are visible. Many endemic plant and animal species are found.

== Mini World's End ==
A nature trail of about 0.75 km takes the visitor to Mini World's End, which is a deep escarpment situated at Pitawala Pathana. It resembles a small version of the famed World's End in Horton Plains. The lookout offers a panoramic view of the Knuckles Range and some of its valleys below. The designated nature trail leads the visitors easily to the escarpment. From there it is possible to walk along to the rock extrusion which allows one to walk right up to the edge.

== See also ==
- Knuckles mountain range
