= Ambanganga Korale Divisional Secretariat =

- Divisional Secretariat
- Location within Sri Lanka
- Coordinates: 7°33′38″N 80°40′35″E
- Country: Sri Lanka
- Province: Central Province
- District: Matale District
- Time zone: UTC+5:30 (Sri Lanka Standard Time)

Ambanganga Korale Divisional Secretariat is a Divisional Secretariat of Matale District, of Central Province, Sri Lanka.

== Demography-Religion ==
Religion in Ambanganga Korale DS Division (2012)
1. Buddhist (74.9%)
2. Hindu (23.1%)
3. Muslim (0.50%)
4. Roman Catholic (0.90%)
5. Other Christian (0.70%)
6. Other (0.00%)
