= Kandalama Reservoir =

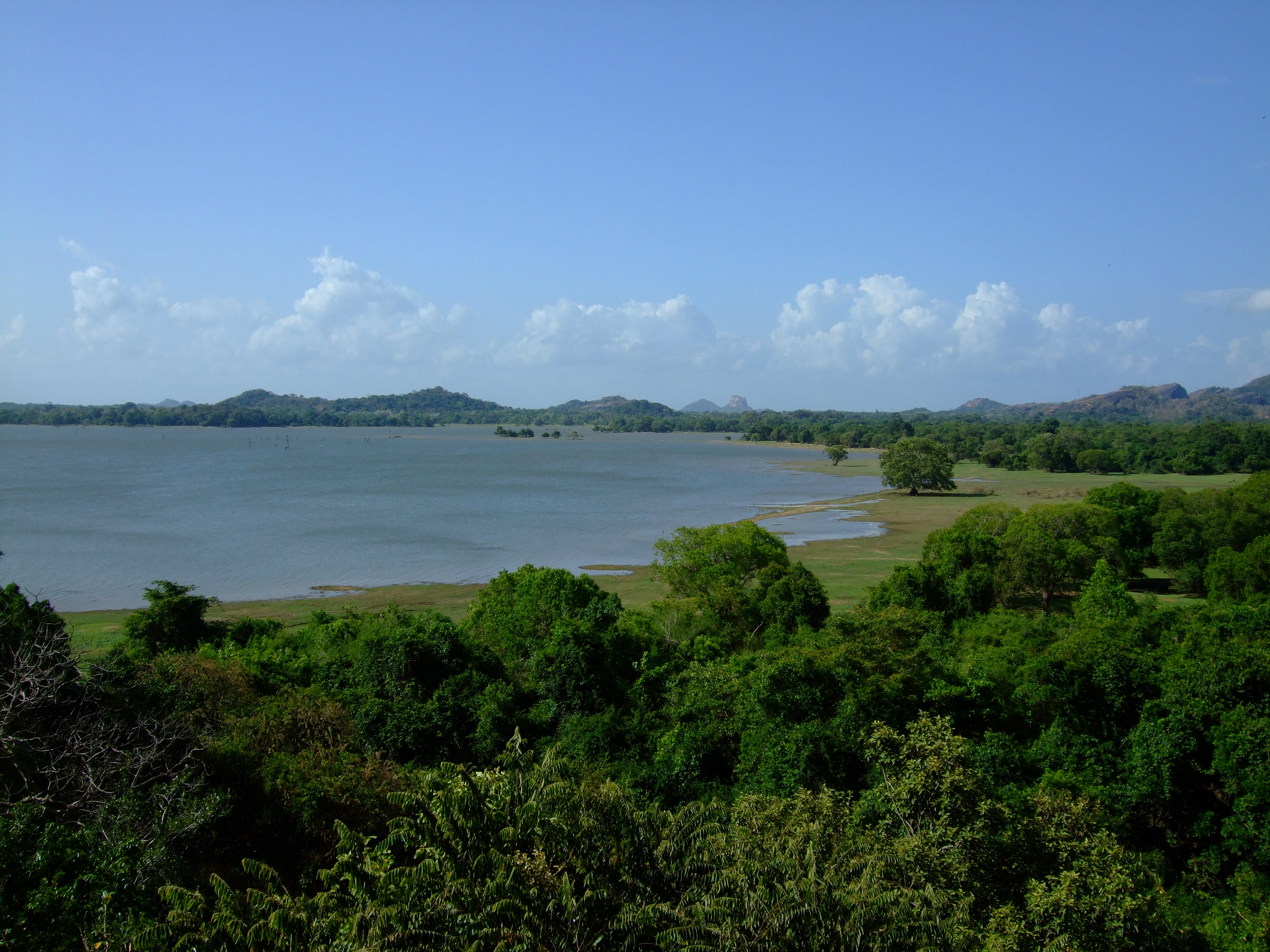
- Northern region of the Kandalama Reservoir, as seen from Heritance Kandalama in June 2008.

- Location within Sri Lanka
- Country: Sri Lanka
- Location: Kandalama
- Coordinates: 07°52′38″N 80°42′00″E
- Purpose: Irrigation
- Status: Operational
- Owner: Mahaweli Authority

Dam and spillways
- Type of dam: Embankment dam
- Height: 21 m (69 ft)
- Length: 1,600 m (5,200 ft)
- Spillway capacity: 33.3 million cu. Meters

Reservoir
- Total capacity: 33,300,000 m^{3} (1.18×10^{9} cu ft)
- Catchment area: 102 km^{2} (39.4 mi^{2})
- Maximum length: 4.8 km (3.0 mi)
- Maximum width: 2.3 km (1.4 mi)

The Kandalama Reservoir (also erroneously known as the Kandalama Lake) is a reservoir in Kandalama, Sri Lanka. The reservoir is created by the 21 m (69 ft) high and 1,600 m (5,200 ft) wide Kandalama Dam. Water from the dam is used for irrigation purposes in the region, extending up to Kekirawa. The tank was created by constructing a dam across one of the main tributaries of Kala Wewa - the Mirisgoniya River. During 1952 to 1957, the tank was rehabilitated by the Department of Irrigation of Sri Lanka. The reservoir and hotel is situated with the Kaludiya Pokuna Forest archeological site.

The reservoir measures 4.8 km (3.0 mi) and 2.3 km (1.4 mi) at its longest length and width respectively, with a catchment area of 102 km^{2} (39.4 mi^{2}) and a volume of 33,300,000 m^{3} (1.18×10^{9} cu ft). Due to its scenic surroundings, and year-round water availability, the reservoir is a very popular tourist destination in Sri Lanka.

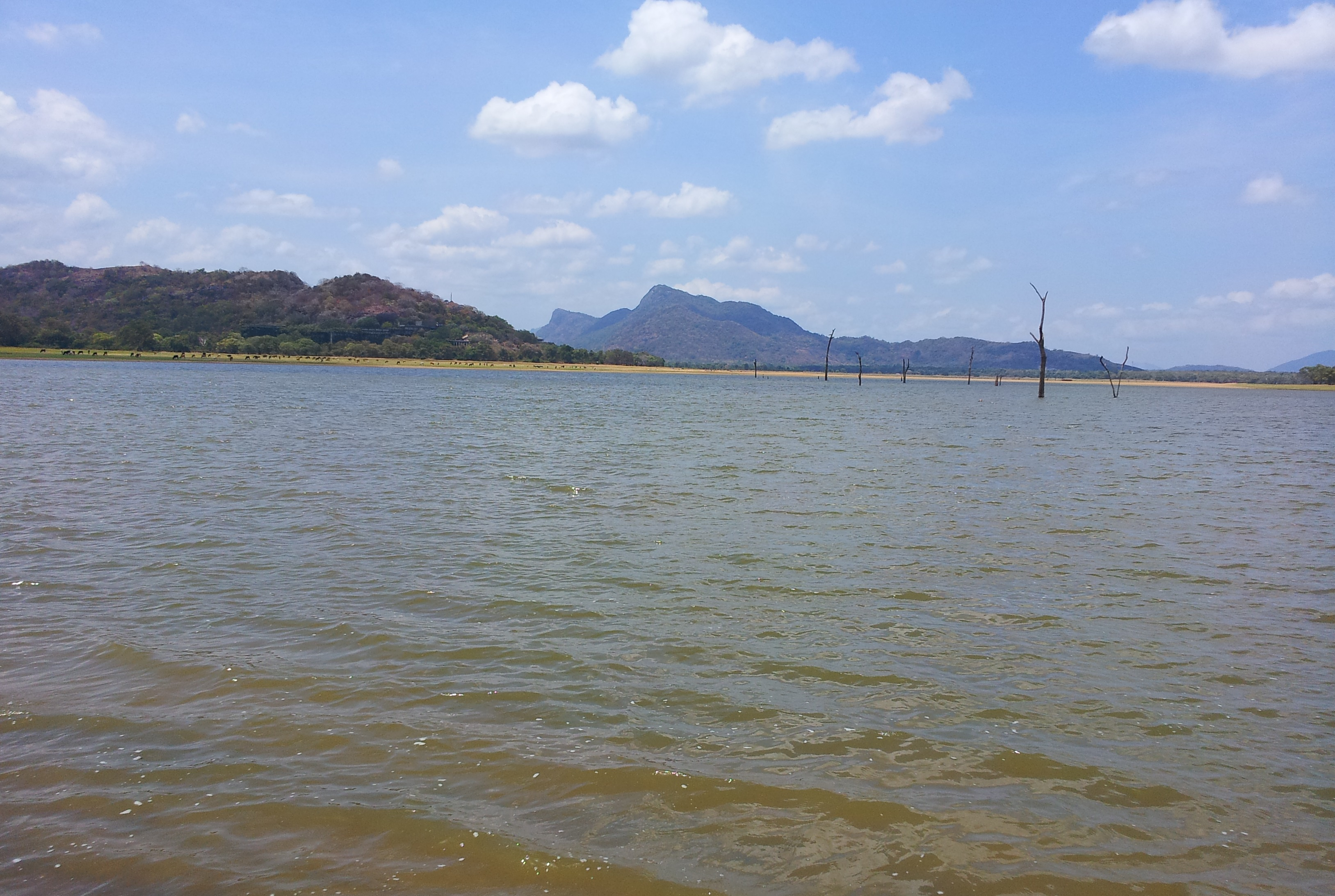
The reservoir during dry season.

== See also ==
- List of dams and reservoirs in Sri Lanka
