= Rattota Divisional Secretariat =

Rattota Divisional Secretariat කයිකාවල, මාතලේ. රත්තොට ප්‍රාදේශීය ලේකම් කොට්ඨාශය
- Divisional Secretariat Mission = Providing services according to the policies of the government and coordinating of resources, uplift the living standards of the people in the division through an efficiant and sustainable planned development process with the participation of the people.
- Nickname: ප්‍රාදේශීය පරිපාලනයේ රත්තොට කේන්ද්‍රස්ථානය
- Interactive map of Rattota Divisional Secretariat
- Country: Sri Lanka
- Province: Central Province
- District: Matale District
- Time zone: UTC+5:30 (Sri Lanka Standard Time)
- Website: Rattota Divisional Secretariat

Rattota Divisional Secretariat is a Divisional Secretariat of Matale District, of Central Province, Sri Lanka.

== Geography ==
Rattota is situated between northern latitudes 7.25-7.33 and Eastern longitudes 80.36-80.45 and 300–1,520 m (1,000–5,000 ft) high from the sea level. The division has a total area of 104.88 km^{2} (40.49 sq mi). The division mostly consists of mountains, hills, and inaccessible places, and southern and eastern boundaries are covered by the range of Hunnasgiri mountain and Knuckles Mountain Range which has been introduced as world heritage. Rattota Division consists of three climatic zones. They are,

1. Upcountry intercentral zone
2. Mid country wet zone
3. Mid country inter central zone

Annual rainfall is between 1000-2500ml. The maximum rainfall of 2500ml receives in December and January. The minimum rainfall receives in July and August. The hottest month is August. January has a very cool climate. Average temperature is 24-30^{○}C.

=== Demography-Religion ===
Religion in Rattota DS Division (2012)
1. Buddhist (71.4%)
2. Hindu (22.3%)
3. Muslim (4.10%)
4. Roman Catholic (1.20%)
5. Other Christian (1.00%)
6. Other (0.00%)

== History ==
When Sri Lanka became a colony in 1815, Rattota had been included to Kandy Udarata regime. Since 1819, Rattota was included to Matale under the administration of Kandy Government Agent.In 1955 Matale became a separate district and Rattota became a part of it. After gaining the independence from Britain in 1948, Matale district was divided in to three revenue divisions and Rattota was the southern part of it. The number of divisions in Matale district was increased to 10 in 1963, and Rattota became a separate division. Since the Grama Niladhari Service was introduced in 1963Rattota was declared as a Divisional Secretariat which consists of 54 Grama Niladhari Divisions.

== Grama Niladhari Divisions ==
1. Bandarapola
2. Godapola
3. Warapitiya
4. Dombagoda
5. Uda Hapuwida
6. Pahala Hapuwida
7. Hangarankanda
8. Muwandeniya
9. Neluwakanda
10. Watassayaya
11. Pitakanda
12. Kandenuwara East
13. Palleyaya
14. Epitamulla
15. Kandenuwara West
16. Alwatta
17. Thambalagala
18. Punchi Seluwakanda
19. Ulpathapitiya
20. Palle Weragama
21. Koswana North
22. Uda Weragama
23. Wiharagama
24. Ikiriyagolla
25. Koswana South
26. Meda Weragama
27. Kaineka
28. Pahala Owala
29. Ihala Owala
30. Pallet aka Pallet aka
31. Kaikawala
32. Maradurawala
33. Lonville
34. Udagama
35. Bogambara
36. Galekoluwa
37. Alakolamada
38. Gansarapola
39. Maussagolla
40. Bodhikotuwa
41. Weralugastenna
42. Wanaraniya
43. Bambarakiri ella
44. Madawaththa
45. Madakumbura
46. Rattota
47. Welangahawaththa
48. Kuruwawa
49. Horagolla
50. Nikawella
51. Dankanda
52. Polwattakanda
53. Kirimatiya
54. Dambagolla
