= Kaludiya Pokuna Forest =

Forest in Sri Lanka

Kaludiya Pokuna Forest and Archeological Site
- කළුදිය පොකුණ පුරාවිද්‍යා භූමිය
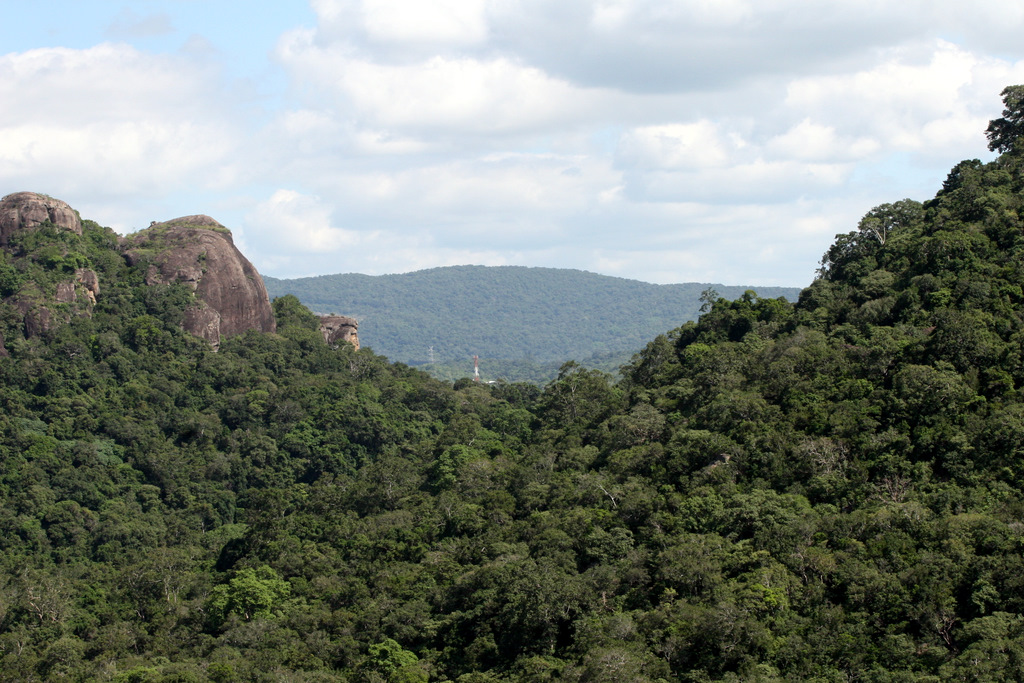
- View from Kandalama Hotel Side
- Interactive map of Kaludiya Pokuna Forest and Archeological Site
- Location: Central Province, Sri Lanka
- Nearest city: Dambulla
- Coordinates: 7°52′02″N 80°44′01″E
- Governing body: Department of Archeology

Archaeological Protected Monument of Sri Lanka
- Type: Natural
- Region: Ancient place of Monk Meditation

Kaludiya Pokuna Archeological Forest Site (කළුදිය පොකුණ පුරාවිද්‍යා භූමිය) is a forest with archeological remains in Kandalama, in the Dry Zone of Sri Lanka.

== Etymology ==
The term Kaludiya Pokuna (කළුදිය පොකුණ) means black water pond or black water pool in the Sinhalese language.

== Archeological remains ==
Kaludiya Pokuna was settled in the 2nd century BC as a monastery complex. This archaeological site features the remains of an uposathaghara building used for monks rituals, a cankamana path, parivena residential cells, bathhouses, and lavatories.

== Gallery ==
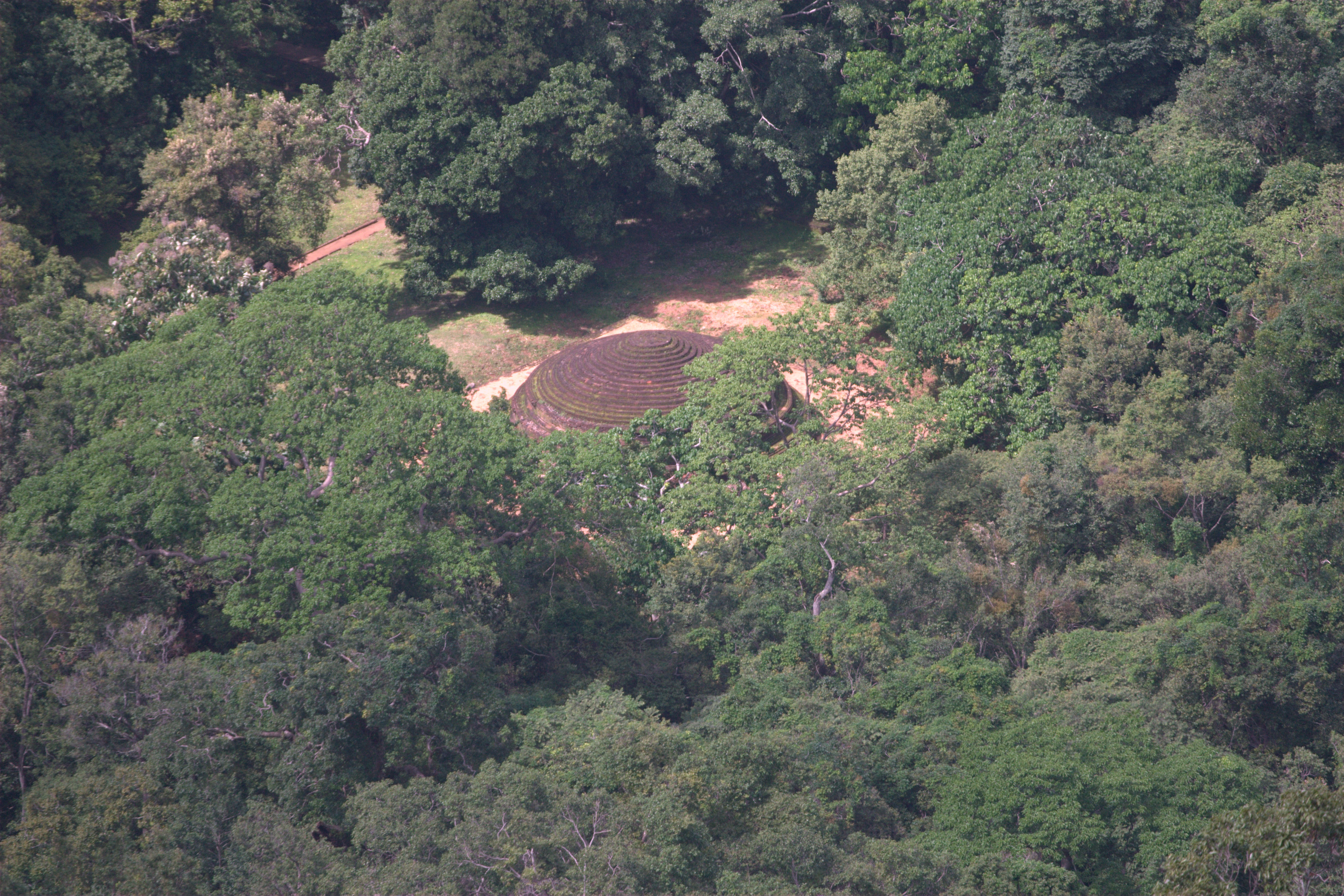
Pagoda at Kaludiya Pokuna

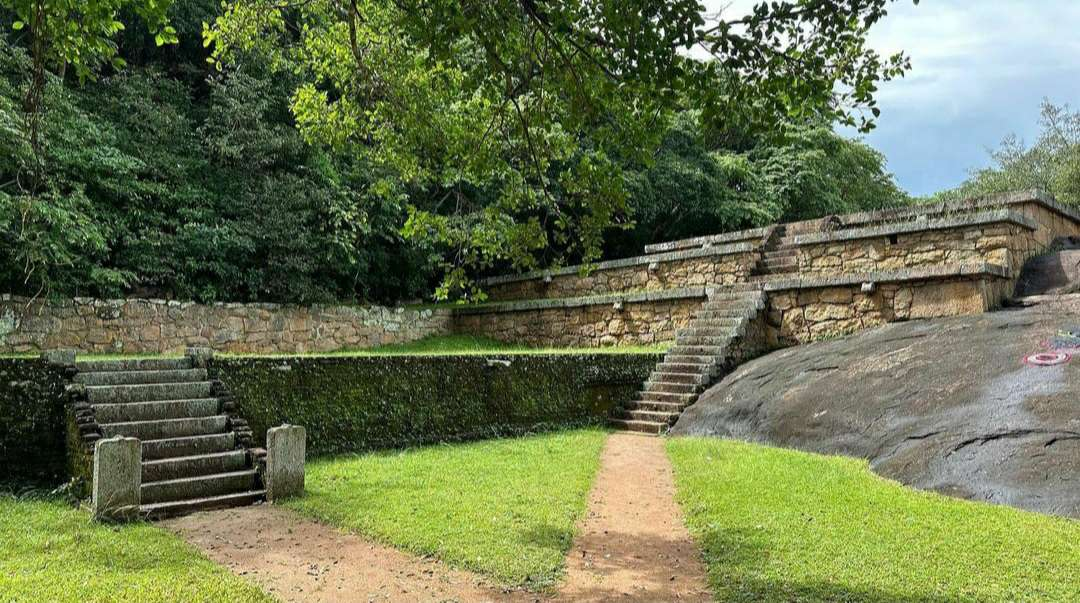
Former monasteries at Kuladiya Pokuna

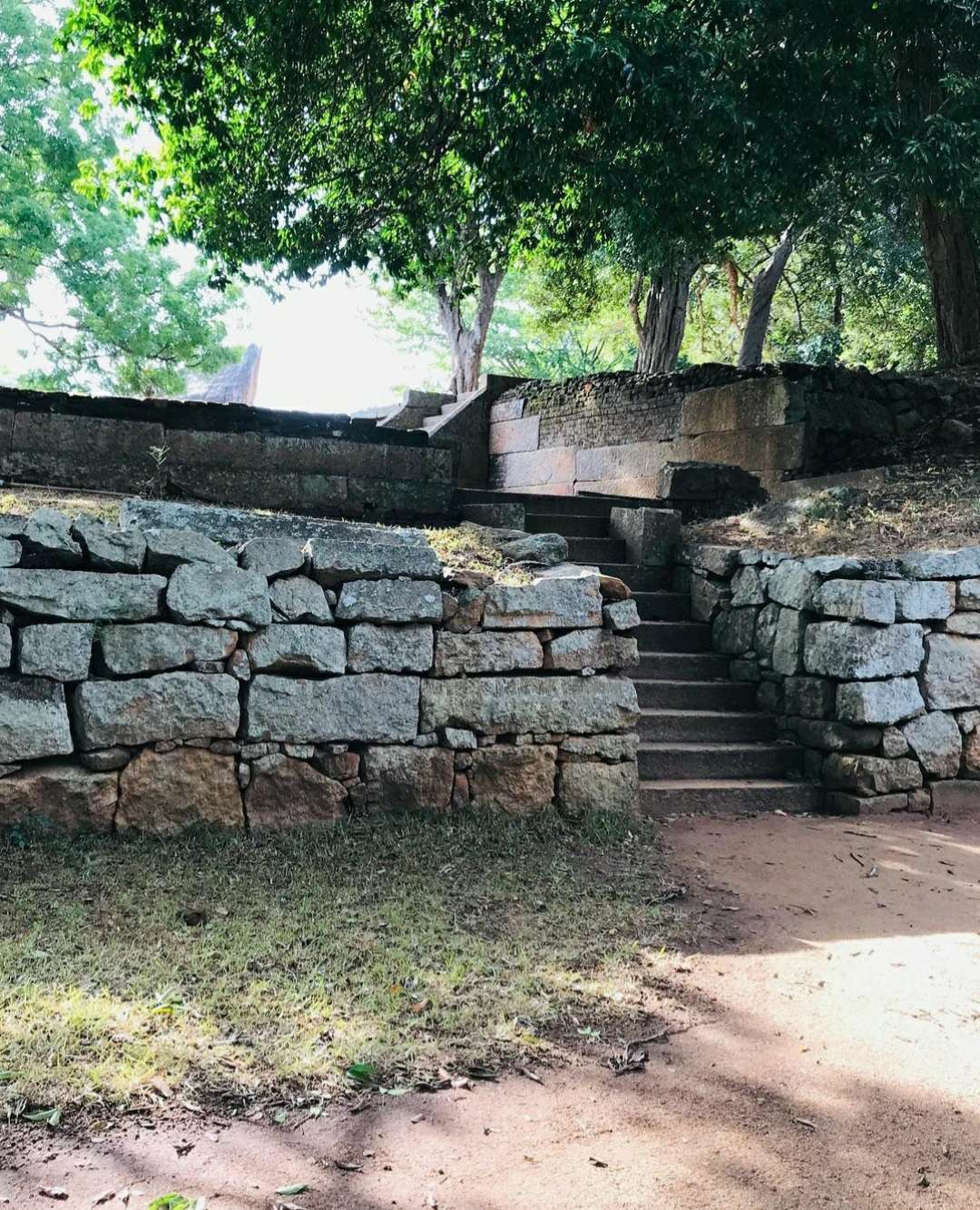
Stairs to main site at Kuladiya Pokuna

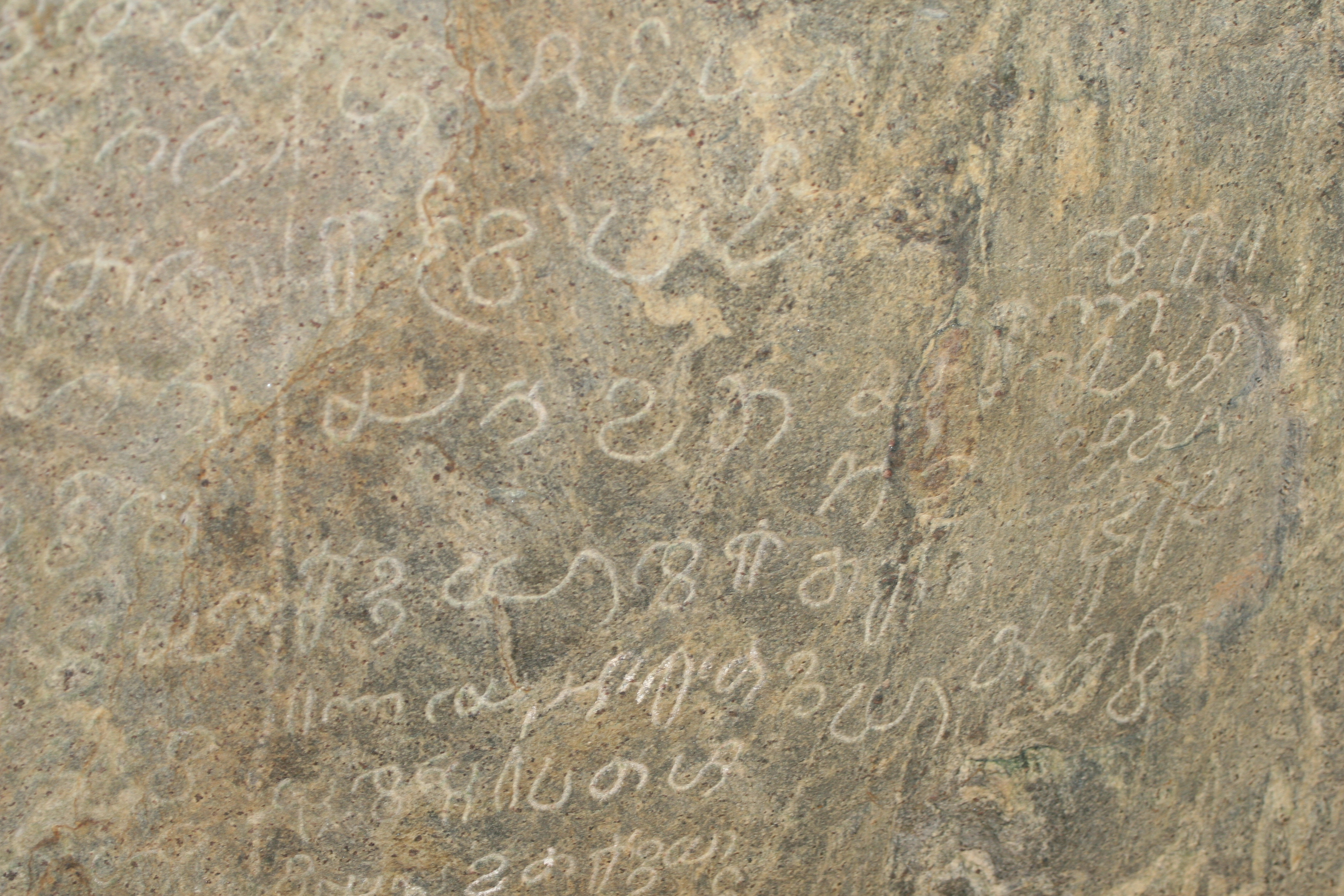
Medieval Sinhala inscription slab at Kaludiya Pokuna

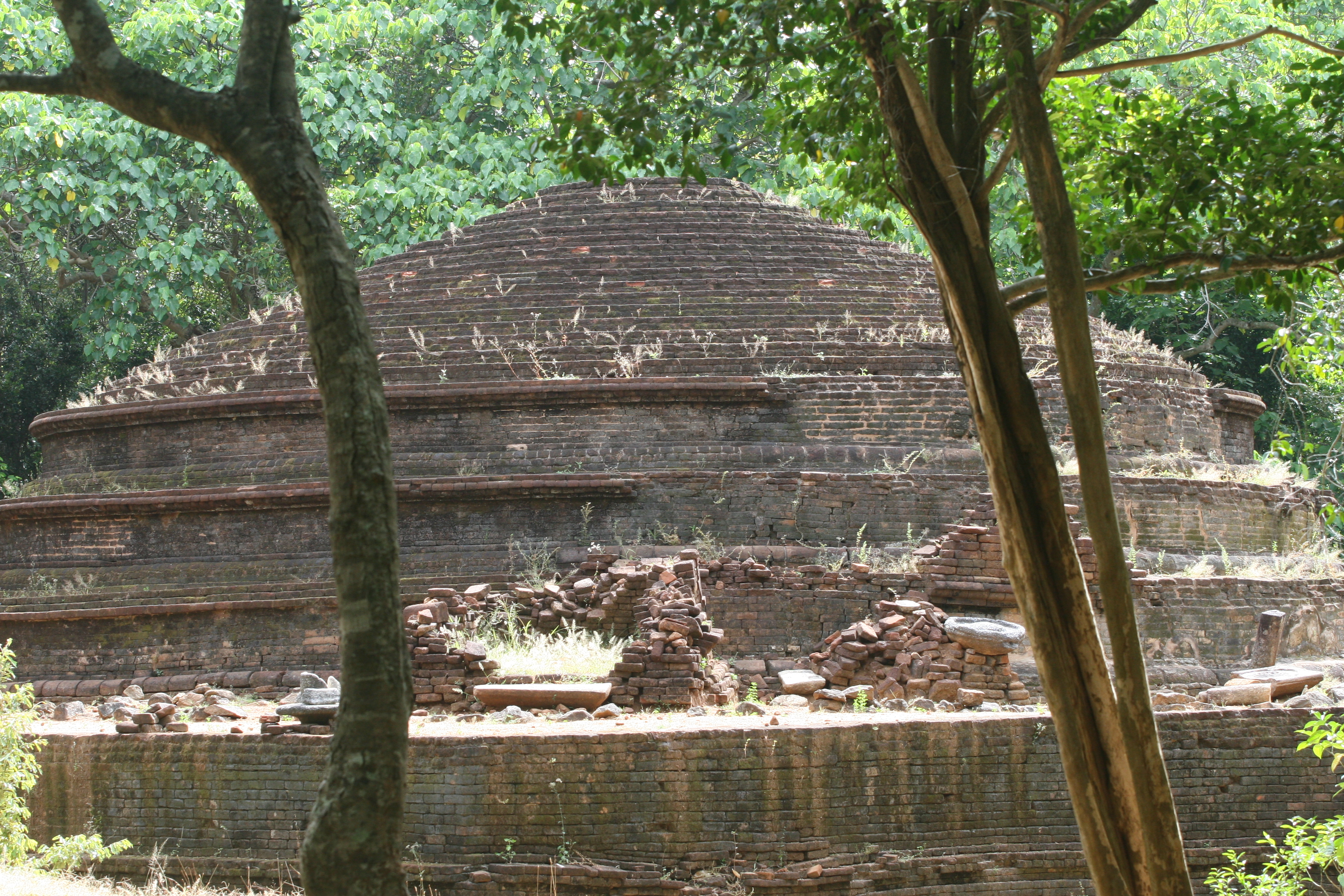
Pagoda at Kaludiya Pokuna

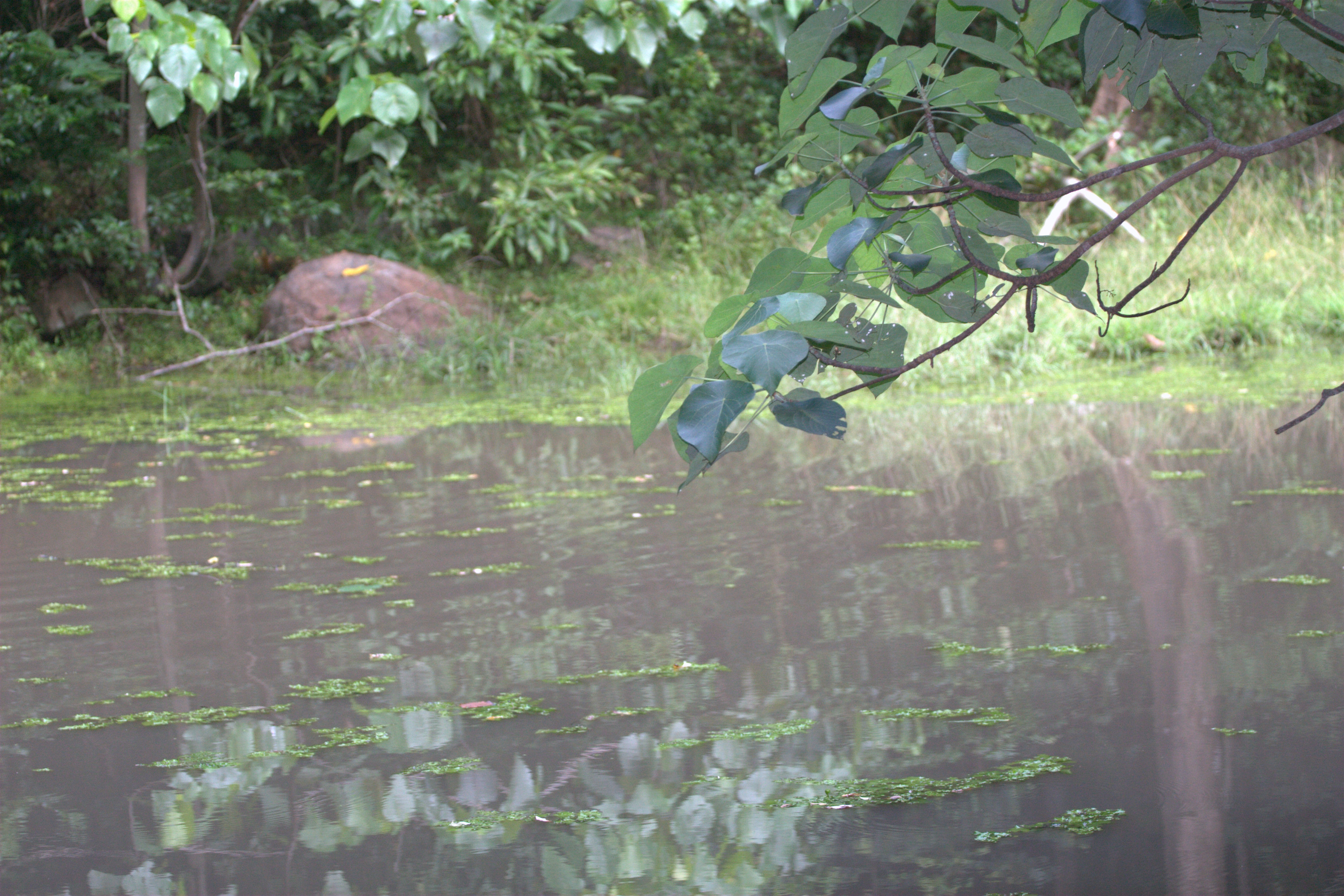
Black pond at Kaludiya pokuna
