= Yatawara =

- Village
- Country: Sri Lanka
- Province: Central Province
- Time zone: UTC+5:30 (Sri Lanka Standard Time)

Yatawara is a village in Sri Lanka. It is located within Kandy District, Central Province. It is located on the Wattegama-Matale (B462) road, about 4.5 kilometres from Wattegama.

== See also ==
- List of towns in Central Province, Sri Lanka
