= Palapathwela =

Palapathwela පලාපත්වෙල பலாபத்வெல
- suburb
- Location within Sri Lanka
- Coordinates: 7°31′53″N 80°37′33″E
- Country: Sri Lanka
- Province: Central Province
- District: Matale District

Government
  - Type: Local government
- Elevation: 363 m (1,191 ft)

Population (2012)
  - Total: 1,989
- Time zone: UTC+5:30 (Sri Lanka Standard Time Zone)
- Postal Code: 21070
- Area code: 066

Palapathwela ( Sinhala:පලාපත්වෙල, Tamil:பலாபத்வெல ) is a suburb of Matale, Sri Lanka. It is located in Matale District, Central Province.The Kandy-Jafna main road (A-9 road) runs through Palapathwela. The population of the suburb, according to the 2012 census, was 1,989.

== Local Government Council ==
Palapathwela is administrated by the Matale Divisional Secretariat.

== Education ==
Government Schools

- Buddhagosha Maha Vidyalaya
- Tamil Vidyalaya

== Facilities ==
There are Two Banks available for general financial needs

- Bank of Ceylon
- Cooperative Bank (A rural Bank which supports Western Union Money transfer)
- Cargills Food City
- Rural Development Bank
- Pradeshiya Sabha

== See also ==
- List of towns in Central Province, Sri Lanka
