= Kaikawala =

- Village
- Interactive map of Kaikawala
- Country: Sri Lanka
- Province: Central Province
- Time zone: UTC+5:30 (Sri Lanka Standard Time)

Kaikawala is a village in Sri Lanka. It is located within Central Province. It is the birthplace of national politicians: P. B. Kaviratne, and Sanjeeva Kaviratne.

== See also ==
- List of towns in Central Province, Sri Lanka
