= Naula Divisional Secretariat =

- Divisional Secretariat
- Country: Sri Lanka
- Province: Central Province
- District: Matale District
- Time zone: UTC+5:30 (Sri Lanka Standard Time)

Naula Divisional Secretariat is a Divisional Secretariat of Matale District, of Central Province, Sri Lanka.

== Demography-Religion ==
Religion in Naula DS Division (2012)
1. Buddhist (93.4%)
2. Hindu (4.50%)
3. Muslim (1.30%)
4. Roman Catholic (0.50%)
5. Other Christian (0.30%)
6. Other (0.00%)
