= Alutgama (Kandy District) =

Village in Sri Lanka

Coordinates: 7°22′N 80°38′E

- Village
- Location within Sri Lanka
- Country: Sri Lanka
- Province: Central Province
- District: Kandy District
- Divisional secretariat: Akurana Divisional Secretariat
- Time zone: UTC+5:30 (Sri Lanka Standard Time)

Alutgama is a village in Kandy District, Central Province, Sri Lanka. It is located about four miles north of Kandy, east of the road to Matale. It is subdivided into Bopegammedda, Digahawatura, Hatiyaldeniya, Kurundeniya, Mahakumburagammedda, and Wakumburawatta.

== History ==
The tradition is that the village ancestors were seven times degraded to the Gattaru, or slave, caste. A now-buried stone had on one side carved the sun and moon, and a dog on the other, signifying their degradation. The inhabitants of the village were recorded as Tamil Vellalas by 1896.

== Demographics ==
Historical population
Year	Pop.	±%
1881	1,150	—
1891	1,113	−3.2%

== See also ==
- List of towns in Central Province, Sri Lanka
