= Galewela Divisional Secretariat =

- Divisional Secretariat
- Country: Sri Lanka
- Province: Central Province
- District: Matale District
- Time zone: UTC+5:30 (Sri Lanka Standard Time)

Galewela Divisional Secretariat is a Divisional Secretariat of Matale District, of Central Province, Sri Lanka.

== Demography-Religion ==
Religion in Galewela DS Division (2012)
1. Buddhist (80.4%)
2. Hindu (1.20%)
3. Muslim (13.3%)
4. Roman Catholic (4.70%)
5. Other Christian (0.30%)
6. Other (0.00%)
