= Pallepola Divisional Secretariat =

- Divisional Secretariat
- Interactive map of Pallepola Divisional Secretariat
- Country: Sri Lanka
- Province: Central Province
- District: Matale District
- Time zone: UTC+5:30 (Sri Lanka Standard Time)

Pallepola Divisional Secretariat is a Divisional Secretariat of Matale District, of Central Province, Sri Lanka.

මෙහෙවර ප්‍රකාශය

ප්‍රජා අවශ්‍යතා ප්‍රශස්ත ලෙස ඉටු කිරීම සඳහා මානව හා භෞතික සම්පත් ඵලදායීව හා කාරයක්ෂමව මෙහෙයවීම.

Conduct effective and efficient human and physical resources to fulfill the needs of the community.

The Pallepola division has situated in the Matale district and 18 km away from the Matale town. The total area of the division is 80.5 square kilometers, consist from 44 grama niladari divisions, 111 villages. The division has conducted by 14 divisional secretaries and current divisional secretary is Miss. H.M.C. Ekanayake.

Divisional secretariat has been divided into 10 main sections in order to provide effective and efficient service for the public.

The 10 main sections are,

- Administration

- Land

- Accounts

- DRP (Department Registration of Person)

- Registrar

- Field Officers

- Samurdhi

- Planning

- Vidatha

- Social Development

== Demography-Religion ==
Religion in Pallepola DS Division (2012)
1. Buddhist (92.1%)
2. Hindu (3.60%)
3. Muslim (3.70%)
4. Roman Catholic (0.40%)
5. Other Christian (0.20%)
6. Other (0.00%)

== Grama Niladari Divisions - Pallepola ==
1. Ariyagama

2. Rusigama Ihalagama

3. Rusigama Pahalagama

4. Ambokka

5. Maningamuwa Nagenehira

6. Maningamuwa Batahira

7. Dewarammulla

8. Galahitiyagama

9. Millawana Ihalagama

10. Millawana Pahalagama

11. Millawana Madagama

12. Kobbawehera

13. Janaka Gama

14. Nilannoruwa janapadaya

15. Demadoya

16. Kirioruwa

17. Akuramboda

18. Kandewatta

19. Kosgolla

20. Mahayayawatte

21. Medalanda

22. Nagahapola

23. Koswatte

24. Ambokudena

25. Thalakiriyawa

26. Bomeruwa

27. Aluthgama

28. Nilannoruwa

29. Mananwatte

30. Ehelepola

31. Dimbulgamuwa

32. Moragaspitiya

33. Udurampelessa

34. Koholanwala

35. Walmoruwa

36. Pallepola Uthura

37. Monarawila

38. Ekamuthugama

39. Pallepola Dakuna

40. Paldeniya

41. Thambilideniya

42. Kinigama

43. Dodangasyaya

44. Polwatte
