= Dambulla =

Dambulla දඹුල්ල தம்புள்ளை
- City
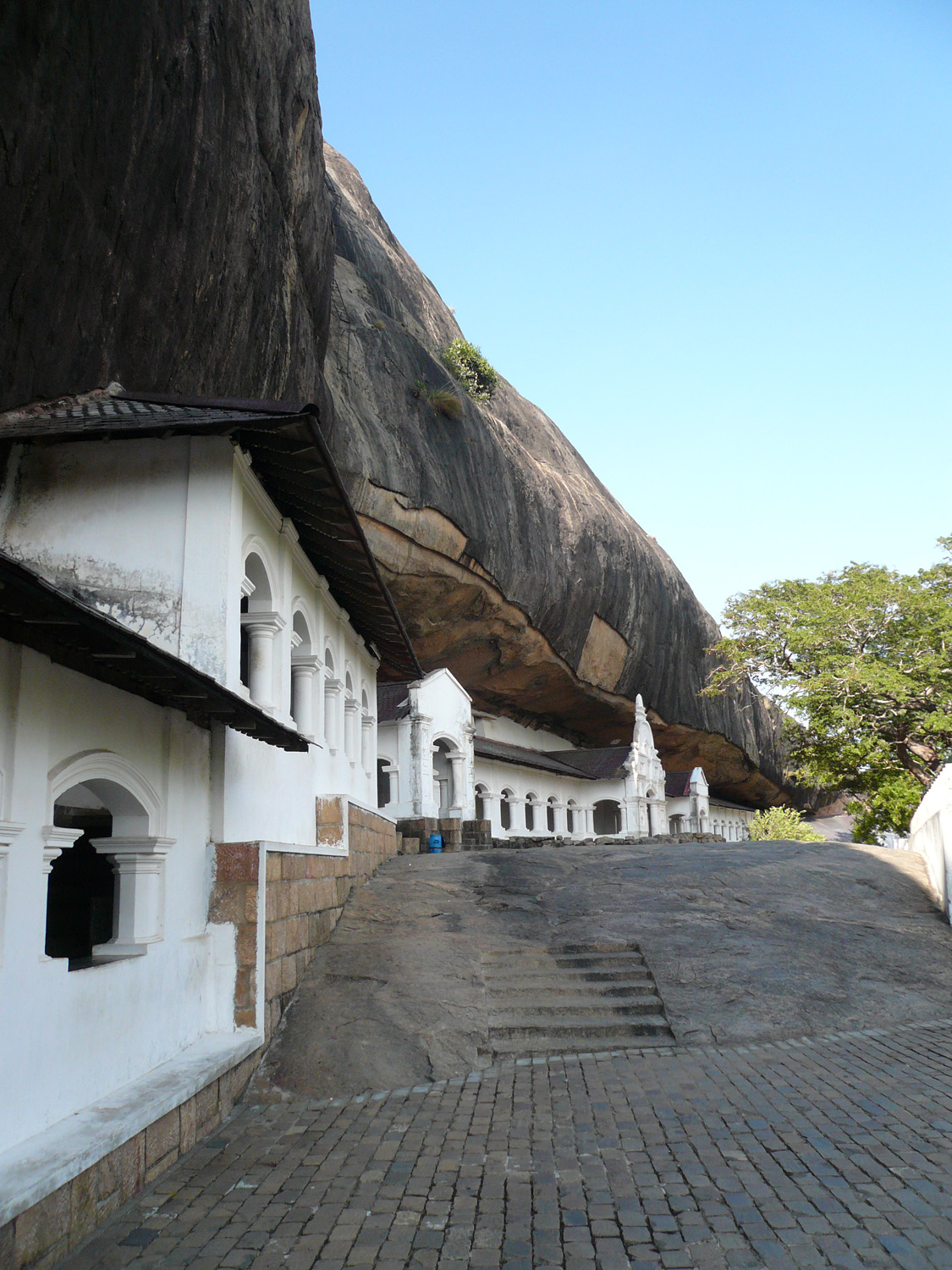
- Dambulla cave temple

- Location within Sri Lanka
- Coordinates: 7°51′28″N 80°39′09″E
- Country: Sri Lanka
- Province: Central Province
- District: Matale District
- Divisional Secretariat: Dambulla Division

Government
  - Type: Municipal Council
  - Body: Dambulla Municipal Council
  - Mayor: Jaliya Opatha
  - Deputy Mayor: Sameera Jayasekara

Area
  - City: 444.0 km^{2} (171.4 sq mi)
  - Urban: 54.0 km^{2} (20.8 sq mi)

Population (2012)
  - City: 72,306 (Dambulla Division)
  - Density: 162.9/km^{2} (422/sq mi)
  - Urban: 23,814 (Dambulla Municipality)
  - Urban density: 441/km^{2} (1,140/sq mi)
- Time zone: UTC+5:30 (Sri Lanka Standard Time Zone)

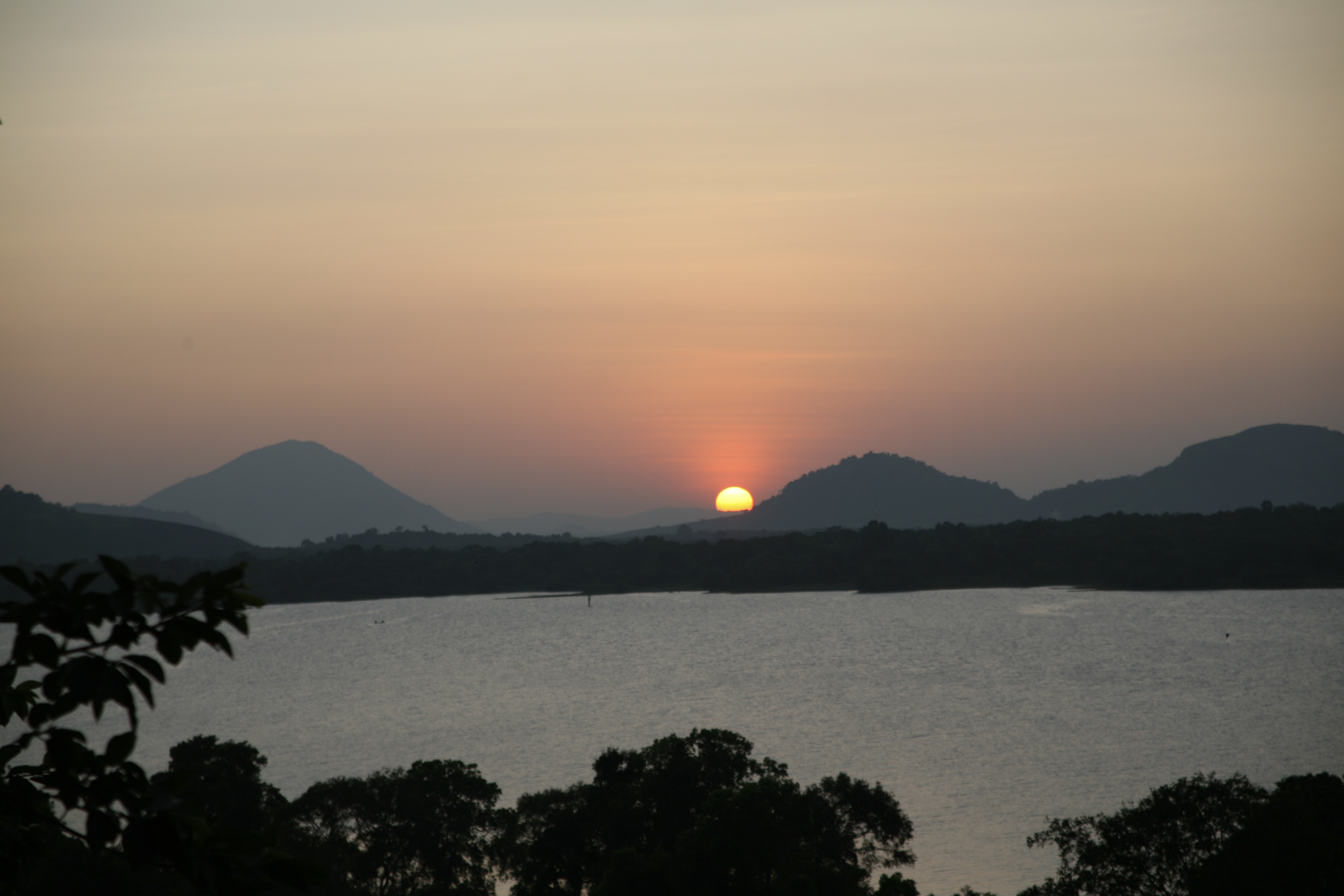
Kandalama Reservoir.

Dambulla (Sinhala: දඹුල්ල Dam̆bulla, Tamil: தம்புள்ளை Tampuḷḷai) is a city situated in the north of Matale District, in Sri Lanka's Central Province. It is the second largest populated and urbanised centre after Matale in the Matale District. It is situated 148 km (92 mi) north-east of Colombo, 43 km (27 mi) north of Matale and 72 km (45 mi) north of Kandy. Due to its location at a major junction, it is the centre of major vegetable distribution in the country.

Major attractions of the area include the largest and best preserved cave temple complex of Sri Lanka, sigiriya rock fortress located in the division and the Rangiri Dambulla International Stadium, famous for being built in just 167 days. The area also boasts the largest rose quartz mountain range in South Asia, and the Iron wood forest, or Na Uyana Aranya.

Ibbankatuwa prehistoric burial site near Dambulla cave temple complexes is the latest archaeological site of significant historical importance found in Dambulla, which is located within 3 km (1.9 mi) of the cave temples providing evidence of the presence of indigenous civilisations long before the arrival of Indian influence on the Island nation.

== History ==
The area is thought to be inhabited from as early as the 7th to 3rd century BC. Statues and paintings in these caves date back to the 1st century BC. But the paintings and statues were repaired and repainted in the 11th, 12th, and 18th century AD. The caves in the city provided refuge to King Valagamba (also called Vattagamini Abhaya) in his 14-year-long exile from the Anuradhapura kingdom. Buddhist monks meditating in the caves of Dambulla at that time provided the exiled king protection from his enemies. When King Valagamba returned to the throne at Anuradapura kingdom in the 1st century BC, he had a magnificent rock temple built at Dambulla in gratitude to the monks in Dambulla.

At the Ibbankatuwa Prehistoric burial site near Dhambulla, prehistoric (2700 years old) human skeletons were found on scientific analysis to give evidence of civilisations in this area long before the arrival of Buddhism in Sri Lanka. Evidence of ancient people living on agriculture have been detected in this area for over 2700 years according to archaeological findings. (750 BC)

It was earlier known as Dhamballai and was ruled by Kings like Raja Raja Chola and Rajendra Chola during their tenure in the late 10th and early 11th centuries.

== Dambulla Cave Temple ==
It is the largest and best preserved cave temple complex in Sri Lanka. The rock towers 160 m (520 ft) over the surrounding plains. There are more than 80 documented caves in the surrounding. Major attractions are spread over 5 caves, which contain statues and paintings. This paintings and statues are related to Buddha and his life. There are a total of 153 Buddha statues, three statues of Sri Lankan kings and four statues of god and goddess. The latter four include two statues of Hindu gods, Vishnu and Ganesh. The murals cover an area of 2,100 m^{2}. Depictions in the walls of the caves include Buddha's temptation by demon Mara and Buddha's first sermon.

== Demographics ==
=== Ethnicity in Dambulla town (2012) ===
Dambulla is a Sinhalese majority town, there is also sizable Muslim minority with a small Sri Lankan Tamil community. Others include Indian Tamils, Malays, Bharatha, Sri Lankan Chetties and Burgher.

Ethnicity in Dambulla Area (2012)
Population	Percent
Sinhalese	95.90%
Muslims	2.89%
Sri Lankan Tamils	1.05%
Indian Tamils	0.12%
Others	0.05%

Source:statistics.gov.lk

=== Time line ===
- 7th to 3rd century BC: early inhabitants
- 1st century BC: paintings and statues
- 5th century AD: the stupa was built
- 12th century AD: addition of the statues of Hindu gods
- 18th century AD: most of what is seen nowadays
- 19th century AD: an additional cave and some repainting
- 20th century AD: UNESCO restoration and lighting ...

== Sports ==
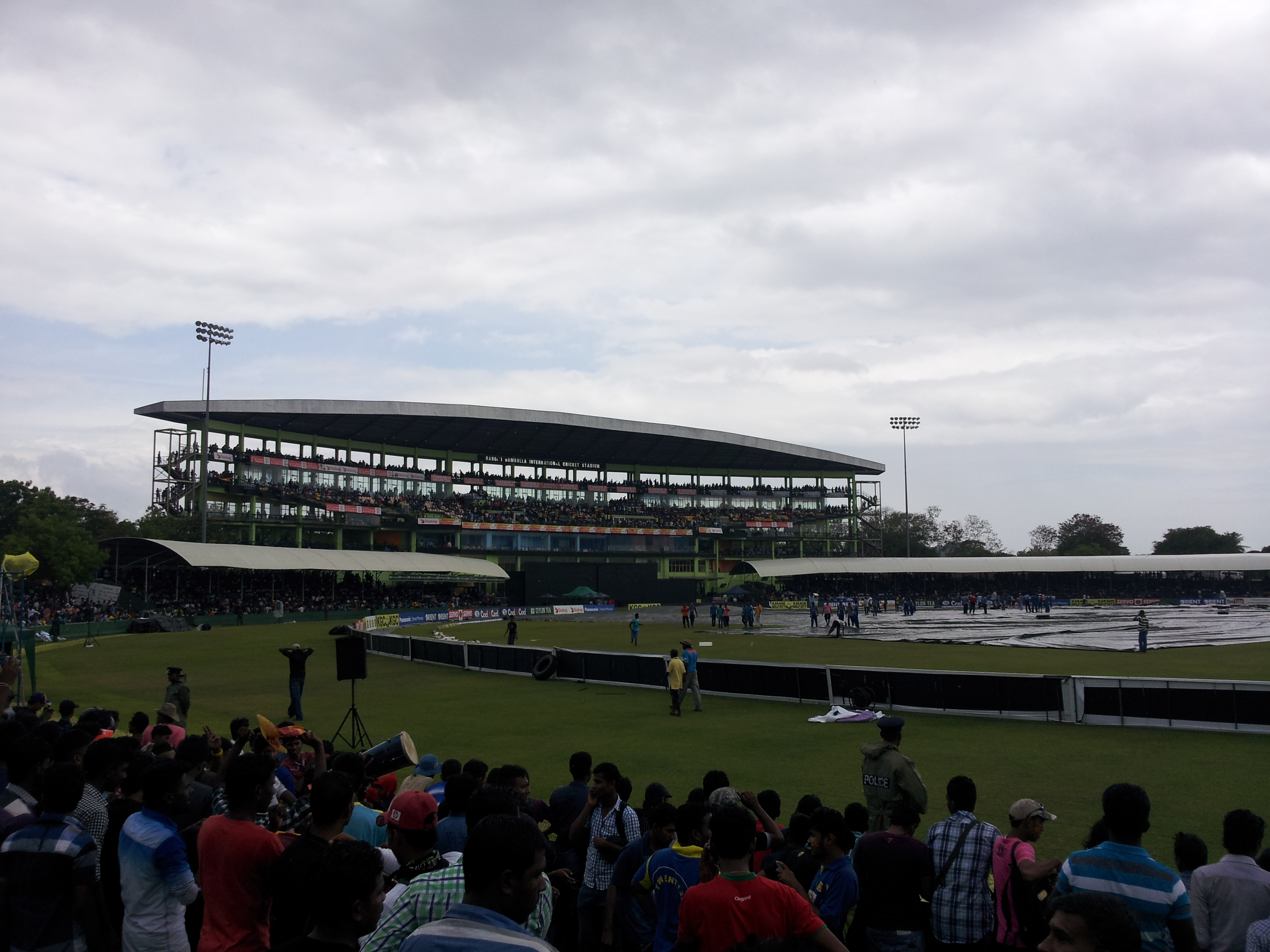
Rangiri Dambulla International Stadium in 2014 during ODI match

The international cricket venue Rangiri Dambulla International Stadium is located here in a scenic area.

== See also ==
- Place names in Sri Lanka
