= Yatawatta Divisional Secretariat =

- Divisional Secretariat
- Interactive map of Yatawatta Divisional Secretariat
- Country: Sri Lanka
- Province: Central Province
- District: Matale
- Time zone: UTC+5:30 (Sri Lanka Standard Time)

Yatawatta Divisional Secretariat is a Divisional Secretariat of Matale District, of Central Province, Sri Lanka.

== Demography-Religion ==
Religion in Yatawatta DS Division (2012)
1. Buddhist (82.9%)
2. Hindu (8.90%)
3. Muslim (6.50%)
4. Roman Catholic (1.20%)
5. Other Christian (0.40%)
6. Other (0.00%)
