= Dambulla Divisional Secretariat =

- Divisional Secretariat
- Country: Sri Lanka
- Province: Central Province
- District: Matale District
- Time zone: UTC+5:30 (Sri Lanka Standard Time)

Dambulla Divisional Secretariat is a Divisional Secretariat of Matale District, of Central Province, Sri Lanka.

== Demography-Religion ==
Religion in Dambulla DS Division (2012)
1. Buddhist (94.5%)
2. Hindu (1.00%)
3. Muslim (3.00%)
4. Roman Catholic (1.20%)
5. Other Christian (0.20%)
6. Other (0.00%)
