= Galewela =

Galewela ගලේවෙල கலேவெல
- Town
- Location within Sri Lanka
- Coordinates: 7°45′27″N 80°34′10″E
- Country: Sri Lanka
- Province: Central Province

Government
  - Type: Pradeshiya Sabha
- Elevation: 209 m (686 ft)
- Time zone: UTC+5:30 (Sri Lanka Standard Time)
- Postal Code: 21200

Galewela is a town in Sri Lanka. It is located in Ambepussa- Trincomalee A6 Road within Matale District, Central Province.

Population In Galewela DS Division-2012.

Total Population : 70,042

- Buddhist : 56,346-80.45%
- Muslim : 9,325-13.31%
- Roman Catholic: 3,287-4.69%
- Hindus : 875-1.25%
- Other Christian : 205-0.29%
- Other : 4-0.01%

== Local Government Council ==
Galewela is the administrative centre of Galewela Pradeshiya

== See also ==
- List of towns in Central Province, Sri Lanka
