= Ukuwela Divisional Secretariat =

- Divisional Secretariat
- Interactive map of Ukuwela Divisional Secretariat
- Country: Sri Lanka
- Province: Central Province
- District: Matale District
- Time zone: UTC+5:30 (Sri Lanka Standard Time)

Ukuwela Divisional Secretariat is a Divisional Secretariat of Matale District, of Central Province, Sri Lanka.

== Demography-Religion ==
Religion in Ukuwela DS Division (2012)
1. Buddhist (64.3%)
2. Hindu (13.1%)
3. Muslim (20.8%)
4. Roman Catholic (1.20%)
5. Other Christian (0.50%)
6. Other (0.00%)
