= Matale District =

District of Central Province, Sri Lanka

Matale District මාතලේ දිස්ත්‍රික්කය மாத்தளை மாவட்டம்
- Administrative District
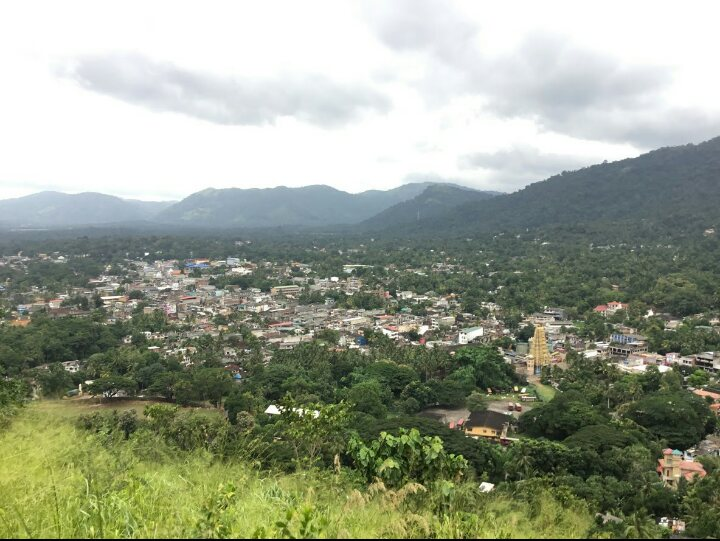
- Panorama of Matale, the district capital

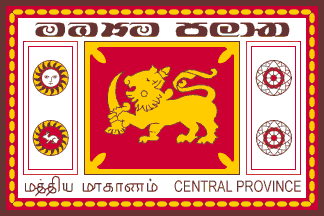
- Flag

- Map of Sri Lanka with Matale District highlighted
- Coordinates: 7°41′N 80°40′E
- Country: Sri Lanka
- Province: Central Province
- Capital: Matale
- Largest City: Matale
- Large Towns: List: Dambulla; Ukuwela; Galewela
- Divisions: List: Divisional Secretariats: 11; Grama Niladhari: 545

Government
  - District Secretary: S. M. G. K. Perera
  - Matale District MPs: List: Rohana Dissanayake (SLPP); Nalaka Kottegoda (SLPP); Pramitha Tennakoon (SLPP); Janaka Bandara Tennakoon (SLPP); Rohini Kumari Wijerathna (SJB)

Area
  - Administrative District: 1,993 km^{2} (770 sq mi)
  - Land: 1,952 km^{2} (754 sq mi)
  - Water: 41 km^{2} (16 sq mi)

Population (2012)
  - Administrative District: 484,531
  - Estimate (2019): 522,000
  - Density: 248.2/km^{2} (642.9/sq mi)
  - Urban: 60,276
- Time zone: UTC+05:30 (Sri Lanka)
- ISO 3166 code: LK-22
- Official Languages: Sinhala; Tamil

Matale District (Sinhala: මාතලේ දිස්ත්‍රික්කය, Tamil: மாத்தளை மாவட்டம்) is a district in the Central Province of Sri Lanka. It is one of 25 districts of Sri Lanka. The administrative capital and largest city of the district is Matale.

The district is considered to be the centremost region of the island and has a total area of 1,993 km^{2} (770 sq mi). It is in the northern part of the Central Province. Sharing borders with 6 other districts, the Matale district is bordered by Anuradhapura to the north, Polonnaruwa to the northeast, Badulla and Ampara to the east, Kurunegala to the west and Kandy to the south.

== Ethnicity and religions ==
Ethnicity in Matale District (2024)
1. Sinhala (80.6%)
2. Sri Lankan Moors (9.77%)
3. Sri Lankan Tamils (8.00%)
4. Hill Tamils (1.46%)
5. Others (0.15%)

Religion in Matale district (2024)
| Religion | Percent |
| Buddhism | 79.45% |
| Islam | 9.91% |
| Hinduism | 8.77% |
| Catholicism | 1.48% |
| Other or not stated | 0.39% |

| Religion | Population(2012) |
|---|---|
| Buddhism | 385,151 |
| Islam | 45,682 |
| Hinduism | 43,432 |
| Christianity | 10,241 |
| Other religions | 25 |

== Cities ==
- Matale (Municipal Council)

== Towns ==
- Dambulla (Municipal Council)
- Galewela
- Naula
- Pallepola
- Rattota
- Ukuwela
- Yatawatta

== Villages ==
- Kubiyangoda
- Gammaduwa
- Hunugalpitiya
- Elkaduwa
- Kaikawala
- Nalanda
- Palapathwela
- Sigiriya
- Wahacotte
- Wehera
- Maligatenna
- Kawatayamuna
- Kandalama

== Heritage sites ==
- Sigiriya
- Dambulla cave temple
- Aluvihare Rock Temple

== Tourist attractions ==
- Pitawala Pathana
- Hunnas Falls
- Sembuwatta Lake
