= James Alfred Corea =

Ceylonese colonial-era headman

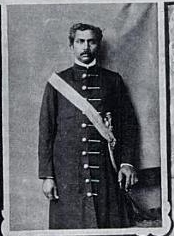
- Mohandiram of Madampe
- Born: 23 November 1871; Sri Lanka
- Died: 11 July 1915 (aged 43); Chilaw, Sri Lanka
- Education: S. Thomas' College, Mount Lavinia
- Occupation: Muhandiram of Madampe
- Spouse: Eugenie Sarah Matilda Attygalle
- Children: Henri Corea and Amybelle Corea
- Parent(s): Henry Richard Corea and Cornelia Wilhelmina Perera

Mohandiram James Alfred Corea (23 November 1871 - 11 July 1915) was a Ceylonese colonial-era headman. He was the Muhandiram of Madampe an area in the Chilaw District of Sri Lanka.

== Early life ==
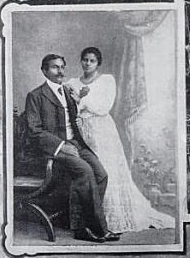
Mohandiram James Alfred and Eugenie Matilda Corea of Chilaw.

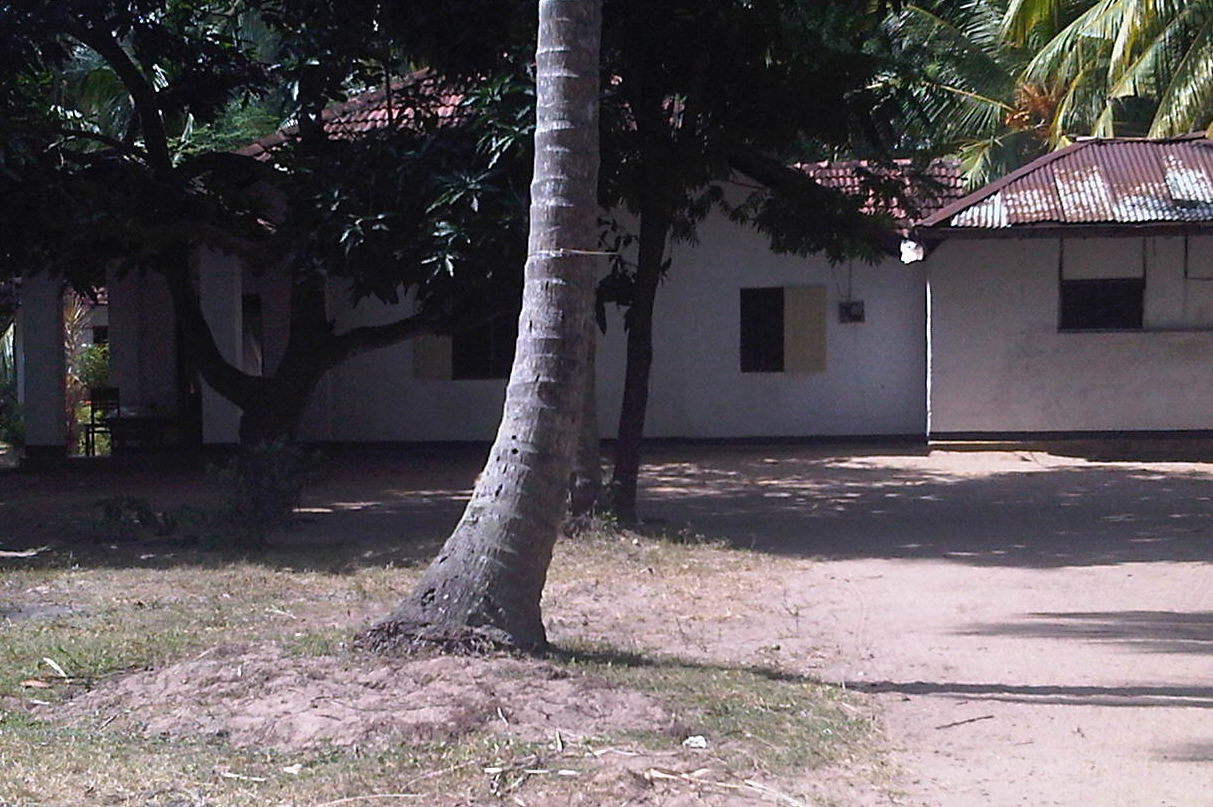
Mohandiram James Alfred Corea and his family lived in the historic home, 'Corea Court' in Madampe - the Seneviratne and Corea families lived here.

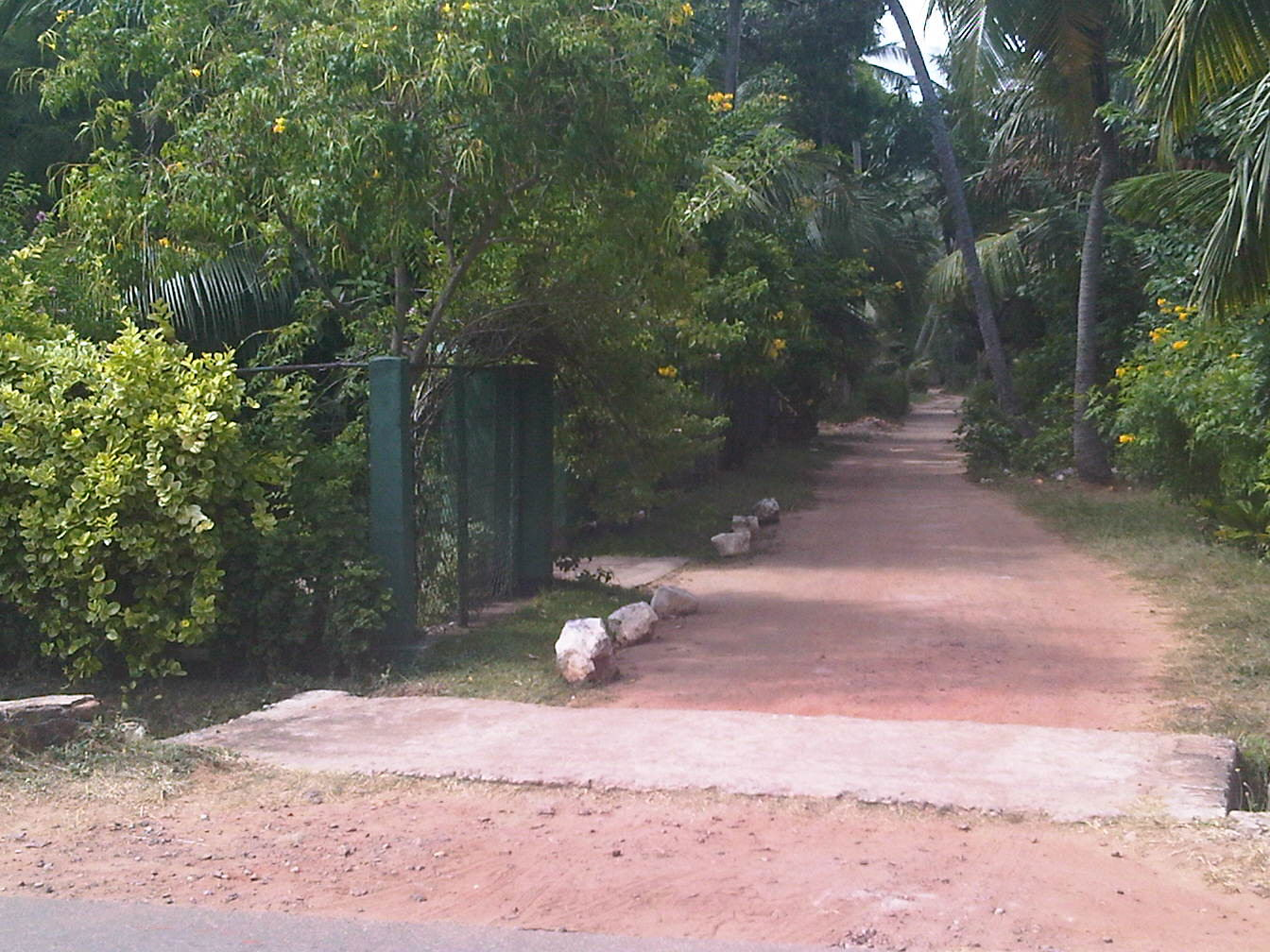
The entrance to the iconic Sri Lankan home - Corea Court, Madampe, on the west coast of Sri Lanka.

The young James Alfred Corea was educated at the prestigious St Thomas' College, Mt. Lavinia.

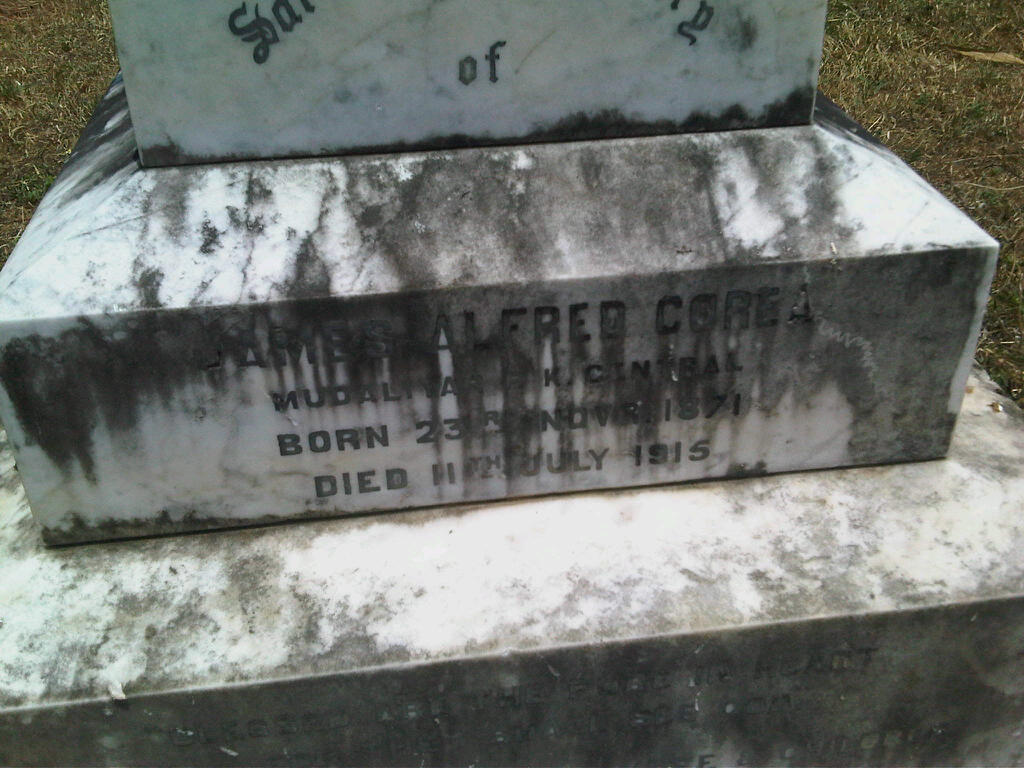
The grave in Marawila of Government Agent James Alfred Corea.

James Alfred Corea was born on 23 November 1871 at Negombo to Mudaliyar Henry Richard Corea and Cornelia Wilhelmina Perera. He was the grandson of Simon Corea J.P and Mudaliyar of Alutkuru Korale, and Cornelia Dias Bandaranaike. Sri Lankan author Kumari Jayawardena, writing about the Coreas noted: 'Unconnected to the liquor trade but making their money on plantation ventures was the Corea Family of Chilaw, an influential Govigama group with a history going back to Portuguese rule when they were warriors to Sinhala kings. During Dutch and British rule, members of the family were officials serving the state in various ways and rewarded with titles. Some members of the family took to the legal and medical professions, most notably the sons of Charles Edward Corea (a solicitor), who were active in local politics and in the Chilaw Association which campaigned against British land policies - especially the Waste Lands Ordinance, and for political reforms.' Kumari Jayawardena goes on to state: 'While being professionals and political activists, the Coreas were also important landowners. ' As a child, like some members of the Corea family, he attended S. Thomas' College, Mount Lavinia. He was the only son in the family, he had three sisters, Annie, Missie and Agnes. His sister Missie, married Cyril Gilbert Alahakoon Wijesiriwardana De Alwis, who was a Gate Mudaliyar. James Alfred's grandfather was a justice of the peace and succeeded his brother Johannes as Mudaliyar of Alutkuru Korale after his death in 1835. James Alfred lived in Corea Court with his family in Madampe.

== Later life ==
Mohandiram James Alfred learnt planting under his father after school, then he was appointed Mohandiram of Madampe in 1899. He was a member of the Chilaw Association and the Agricultural Society. He also owned vast coconut estates - Potuwille and Mugunuatuwane. J.A.Corea married Eugenie Matilda Sarah Attygalle on 7 June 1906, the third daughter of Dr. John Attygalle and Charlotte Karunaratne. They lived in a Corea family home known as Corea Court which is located in Madampe, where James Alfred served as a Mohandiram of the town. They had two children, a daughter called Amybelle and a son called Henri who was a notable policeman.

Writing in 1907 about Mohandiram James Alfred Corea, the English author, Arnold Wright in 'Twentieth Century Impressions of Ceylon,' said: ' Mr. J.A.Corea, a descendant (eleventh generation) of Wickremasinghe Bandara, chief of the Seven Korales under the Kandyan emperor (1520–1560) is the son of Henry Richard Corea, Mudaliyar of Alutkuru Korale North....' Wright goes on to state that in '1899 he became Mohandiram of Madampe.' His book contains photographs of Mr. J.A.Corea with the title, 'Government Agent Corea and Native Headmen.'

== Death ==
On being privy to information about an impending fatal communal clash planned by the British, he travelled hours on foot, to warn the Muslim village.

Because of his sacrificial warning the Muslims and their families survived but James Alfred Corea himself, contracted pneumonia caused by rigorous weather and he died on his armchair. He was buried in Marawila, leaving behind his wife, Eugenie Matilda Attygalle and his two children Henri and Amybelle.

== See also ==
- Native headmen of Ceylon
- List of political families in Sri Lanka
- Edirimanne Corea Family Union

== Bibliography ==
- Great Sinhalese Men and Women of History - Edirille Bandara (Domingos Corea) By John M. Senaveratna, (1937)
- A History of Sri Lanka By Professor K.M.De Silva (1981)
- Twentieth Century Impressions of Ceylon: Its History, People, Commerce, Industries and Resources By A.W. Wright, Asian Educational Services, India; New Ed edition (15 December 2007)
