= Gammuladani =

Gammuladani, Gammuladeni, or Grammuladani is a former Sinhala term for a village headman in Sri Lanka. Other terms were arachchi, gamika, gammudaliya, gammudalia, or vidane.

During the colonial period the village headman had wide-ranging powers: his tasks included investigating crimes, coordinating agricultural activities, collecting taxes, and issuing permits for access to land. The post was replaced in the 1960s by the government-appointed Grama Niladhari (previously Grama Sevaka).
