= Vincent Fernando =

Sri Lankan judge

V. M. Fernando

Puisne Justice of the Supreme Court of Ceylon

Vincent M. Fernando was a judge of the Supreme Court of Ceylon (now Sri Lanka).

He served as a crown counsel taking part in several notable cases such as the Basnayaka Nilame Vs Attorney General. He was appointed to the Supreme Court on 11 November 1937. His son, H. N. G. Fernando became the 33rd Chief Justice of Ceylon. His home, Jefferson House is now the residence of the Ambassador of the United States in Colombo.
