= Kandyan Convention =

1815 treaty incorporating the Kandyan Kingdom into the British Empire

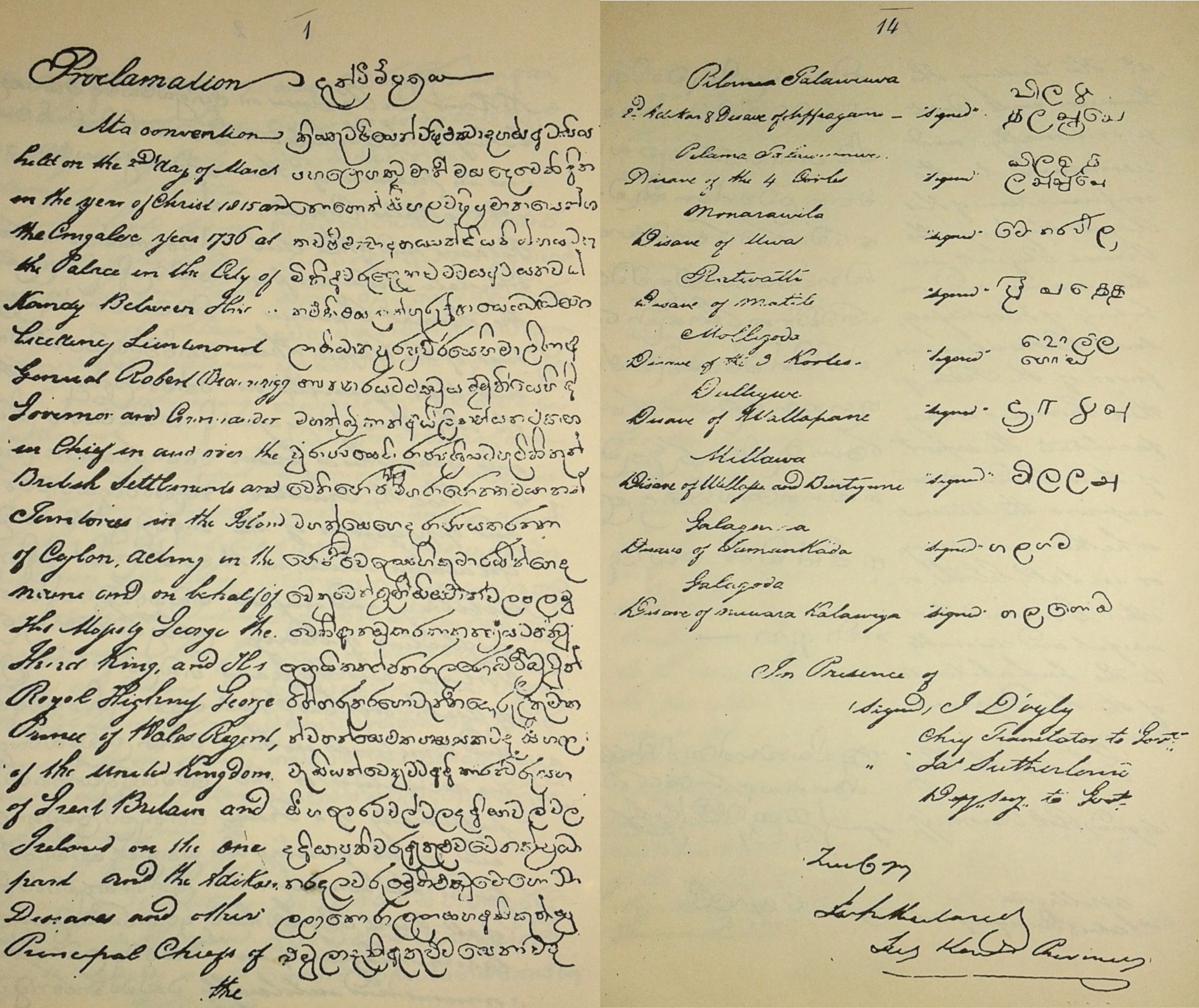
- First (left) and final (right) pages of the convention
- Drafted: 1815
- Signed: 2 March 1815
- Location: Temple of the Tooth, Kandy, Kingdom of Kandy
- Condition: Deposition of King Sri Vikrama Rajasinha; Ceding of Kingdom of Kandy to the British Crown, with retention of local nobility
- Signatories: (Kingdom of Kandy) Kandyan chiefs; United Kingdom
- Parties: 2
- Languages: English; Sinhala

Full text
- Kandyan Convention at Wikisource

In the history of Sri Lanka, the Kandyan Convention (Sinhala: උඩරට ගිවිසුම, romanized: Udarata Giwisuma) was a treaty signed on 2 March 1815 between the British governor of Ceylon, Sir Robert Brownrigg, and the chiefs of the Kandyan Kingdom, British Ceylon, whereas, according to the Sinhala version of the Convention, the signatories were the chiefs of Sihale ^{(note 1)}, for the deposition of King Sri Vikrama Rajasinha and ceding of the kingdom's territory to the British Crown. It was signed in the Magul Maduwa (Royal Audience Hall) of the Royal Palace of Kandy.

== Background ==
The king, of South Indian ancestry, faced powerful opposition from the Sinhalese chieftains who sought to limit his power. A successful coup was organized by the chieftains, ending 2358 years of self-rule on the island and resulting in the imprisonment of the king in Vellore. The treaty is unique in that it was not signed by the monarch on the throne but by members of his court and other dignitaries of the kingdom.

The convention gained a degree of infamy when, according to apocryphal sources, Ven. Wariyapola Sri Sumangala Thero, a Buddhist monk of the kingdom, seized and trampled a Union Jack hoisted by the British, demanding the flag of Kandy be left flying until the convention was signed.

The authenticity of the native signatures has recently been called into question.

== Treaty content ==
The proclamation consisted of 12 clauses.

1. 'Sri Wickrema Rajasinha', the 'Malabar (Tamil)' king, is to forfeit all claims to the throne of Kandy.
2. The king is declared fallen and deposed and the hereditary claim of his dynasty, abolished and extinguished.
3. All his male relatives are banished from the country.
4. The dominion is vested in the sovereign of the British Empire, to be exercised through colonial governors, except in the case of the Adikarams, Disavas, Mohottalas, Korales, Vidanes and other subordinate officers reserving the rights, privileges and powers within their respective ranks.
5. The religion of Buddhism is declared inviolable and its rights to be maintained and protected.
6. All forms of physical torture and mutilations are abolished.
7. The governor alone can sentence a person to death and all capital punishments to take place in the presence of accredited agents of the government.
8. All civil and criminal justice over Kandyan to be administered according to the established norms and customs of the country, the government reserving to itself the rights of interposition when and where necessary.
9. Other non-Kandyan's position [is] to remain [as privileged as previously] according to British law.
10. The proclamation annexing the Three and Four Korales and Sabaragamuwa is repealed.
11. The dues and revenues to be collected for the King of the United Kingdom as well as for the maintenance of internal establishments in the island.
12. The governor alone can facilitate trade and commerce.

== Signatories ==
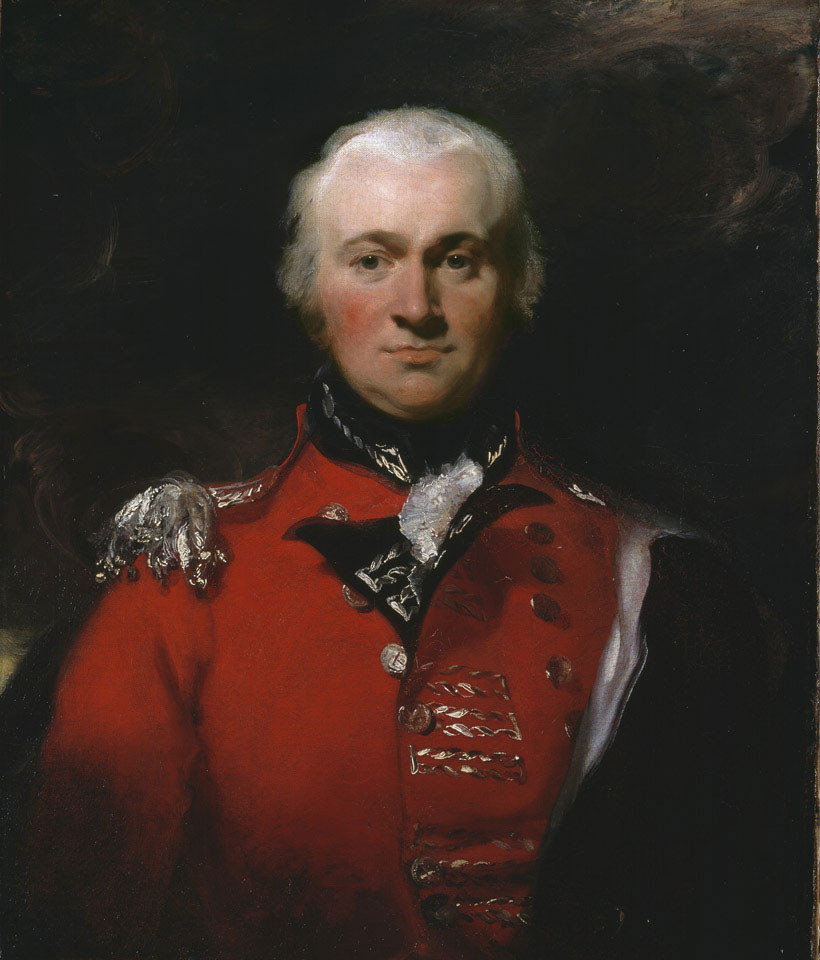
Lieutenant-General Sir Robert Brownrigg, Governor of Ceylon

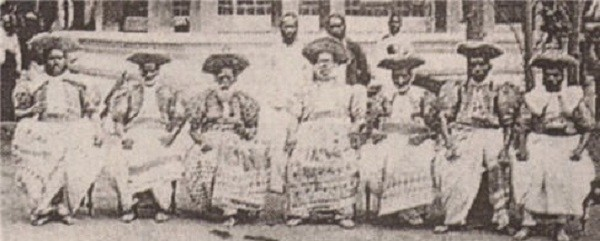
Part of the Kandyan contingent to the convention

- Sir Robert Brownrigg – Governor of Ceylon
- Molligoda (the elder) – 1st Adigar and Dissawa of the Sath Korles
- Pilima Talawuwe (the elder) – 2nd Adigar and Dissawa of Sabaragamuwa
- Pilima Talawuwe (the younger) – Dissawa of Hathra Korles
- Monarawila – Dissawa of Uva
- Ratwatte – Dissawa of Matale
- Molligoda (the younger) – Dissawa of Thun Korles
- Dullewe – Dissawa of Walapane
- Millewe – Dissawa of Wellassa and Binthenna
- Galagama – Dissawa of Tamankaduwa
- Galagoda – Dissawa of Nuwara Kalawiya

=== Witnesses ===
- John D'Oyly – Chief Translator to the Government
- J.A.S. Surtherland – Deputy Secretary to the Government

== The document ==
The archives of the Government of Sri Lanka possesses the original copy of the convention.

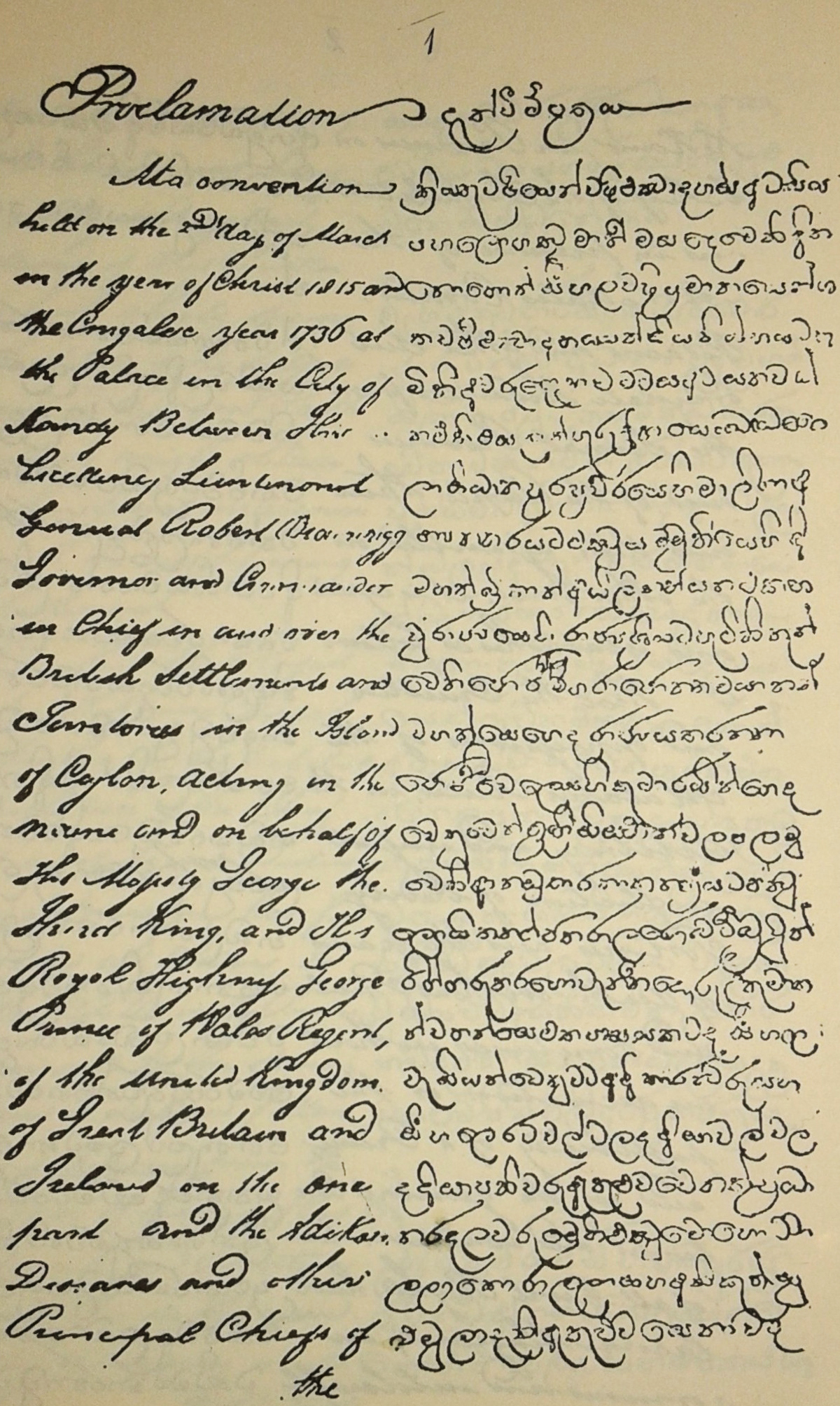
Page 1

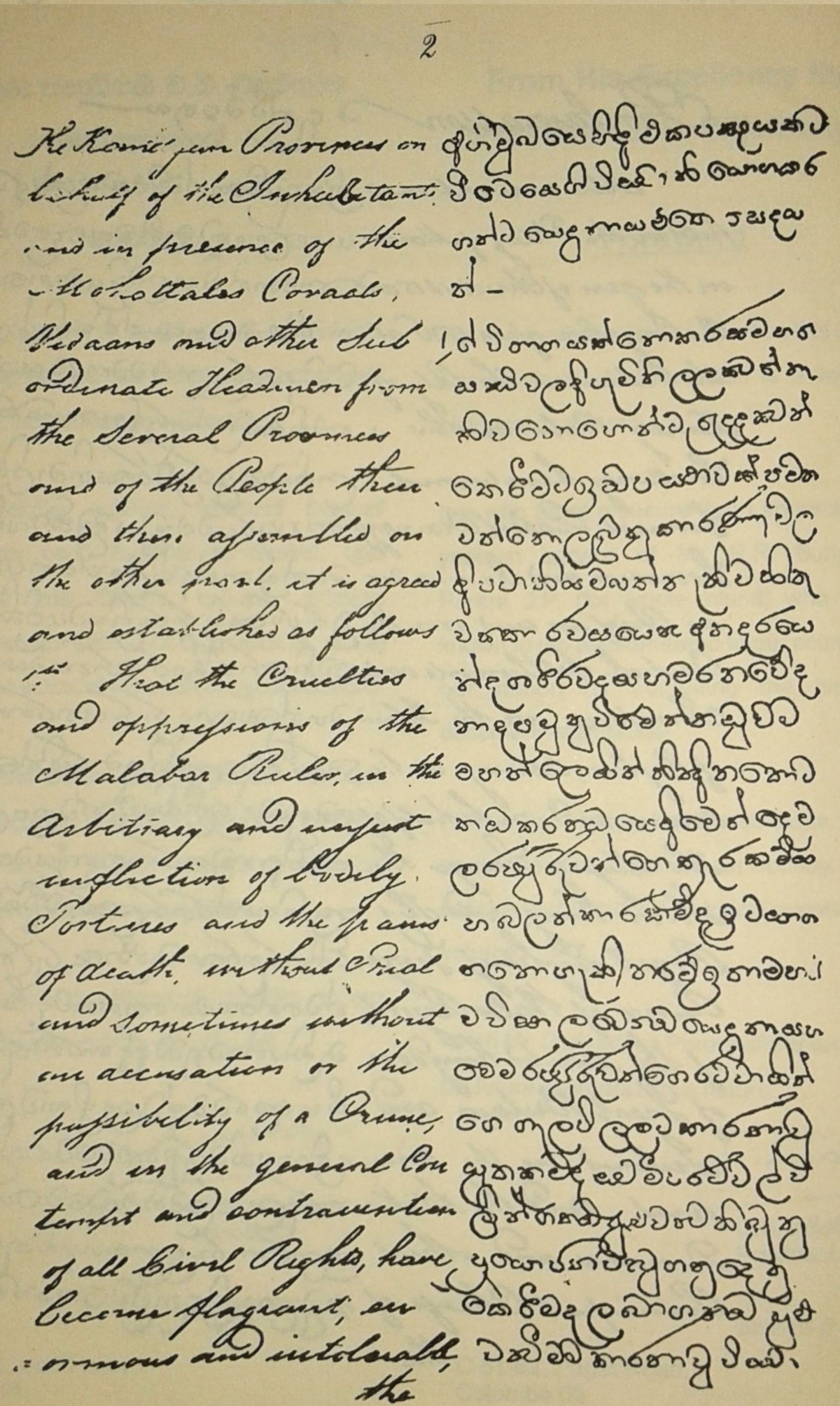
Page 2

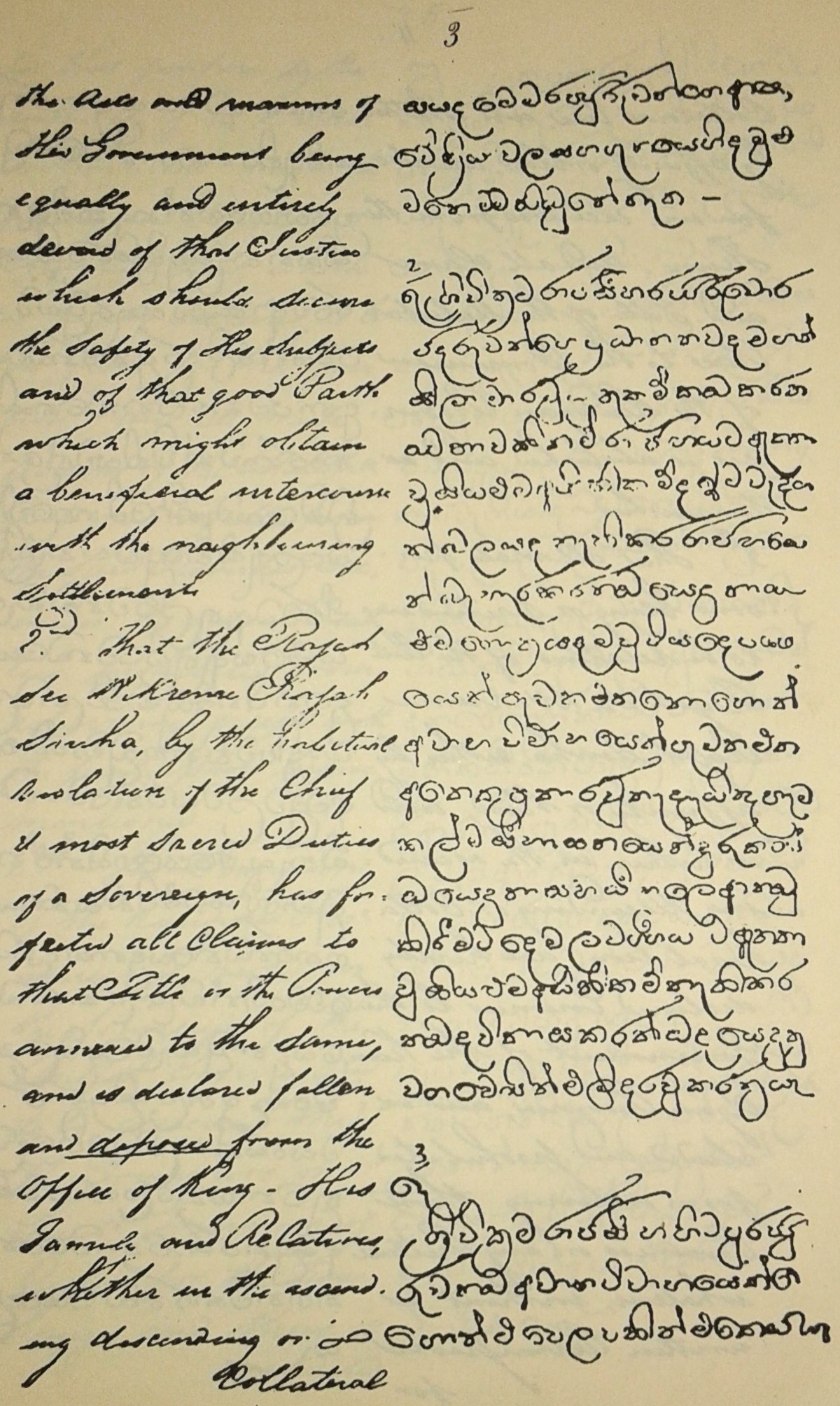
Page 3

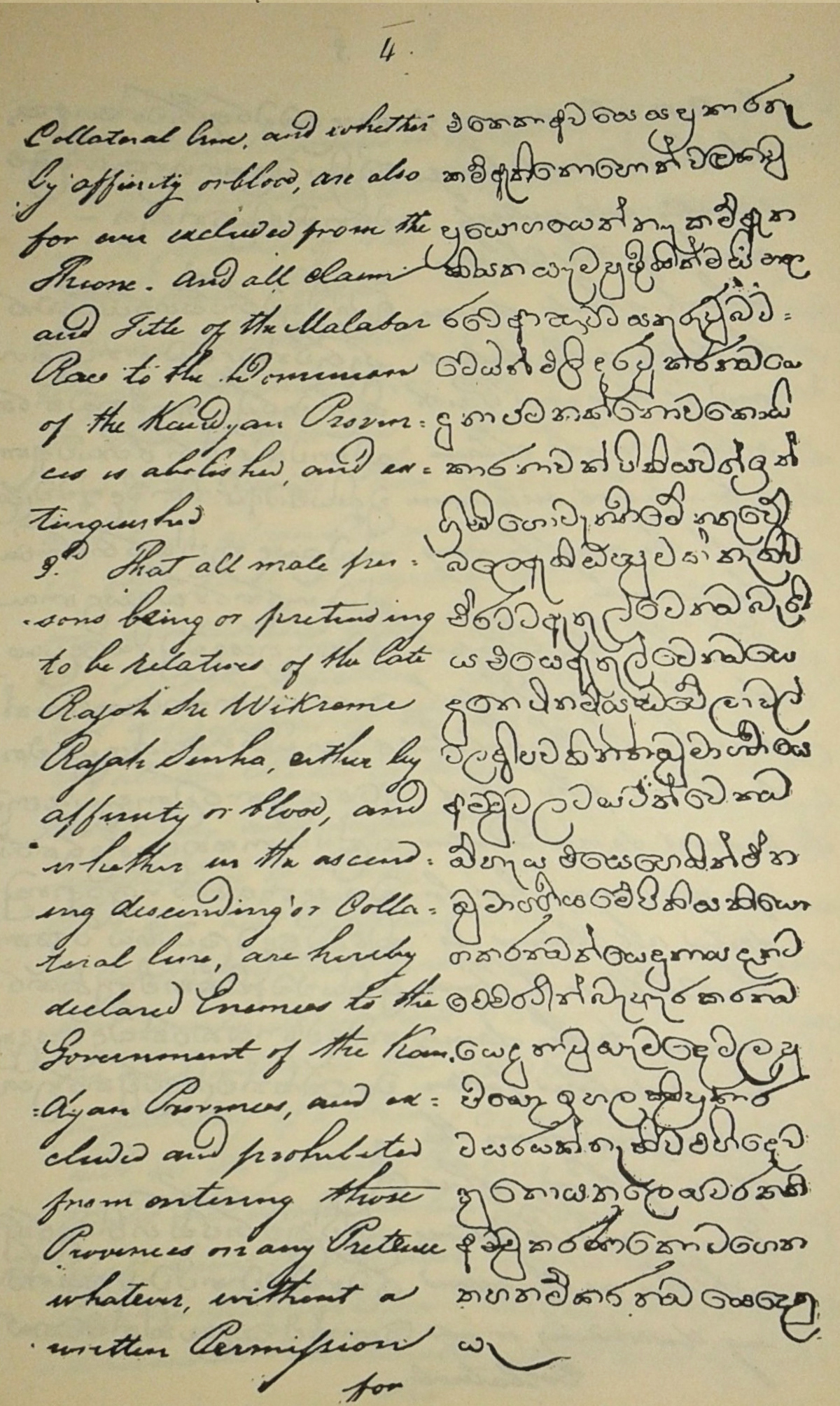
Page 4

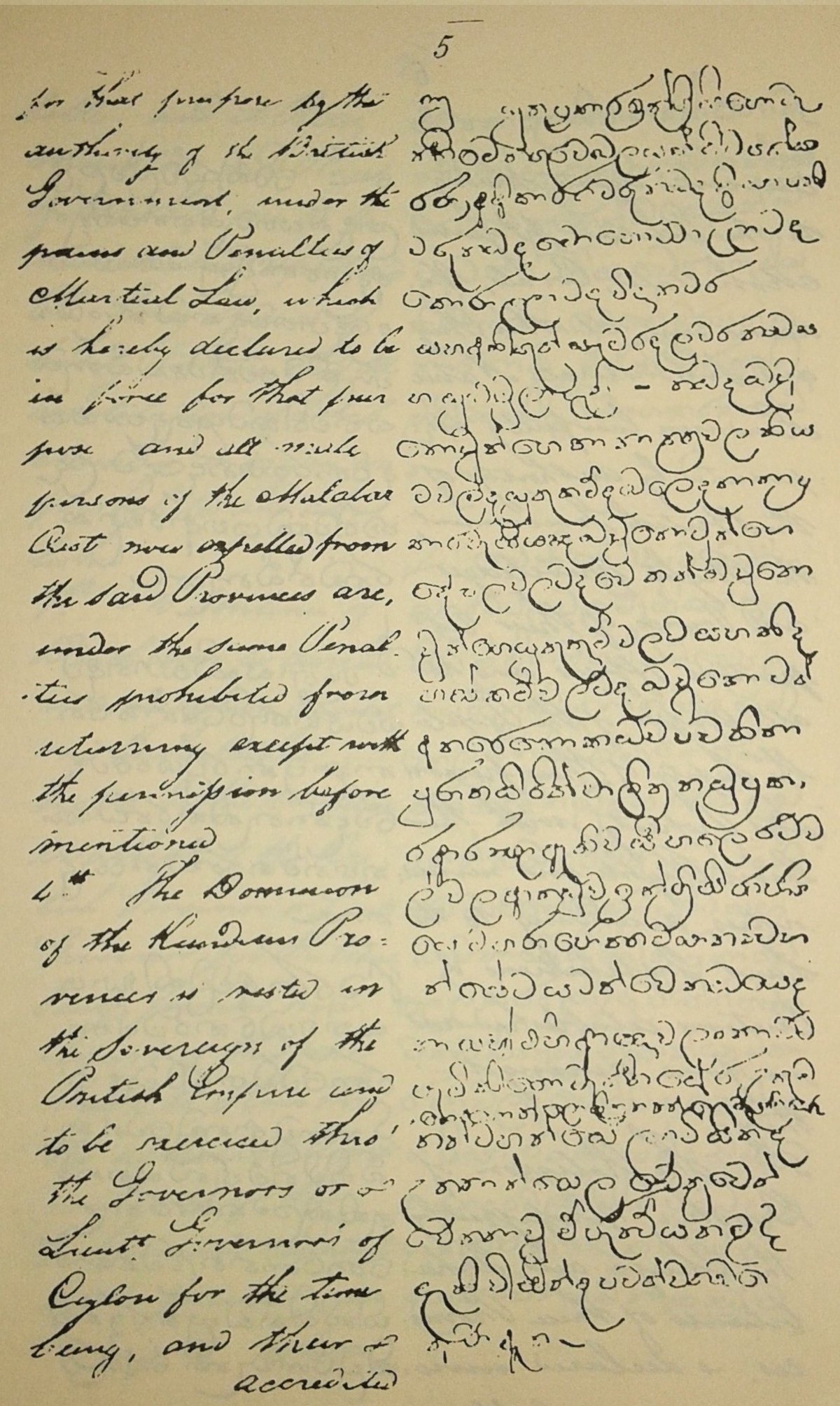
Page 5

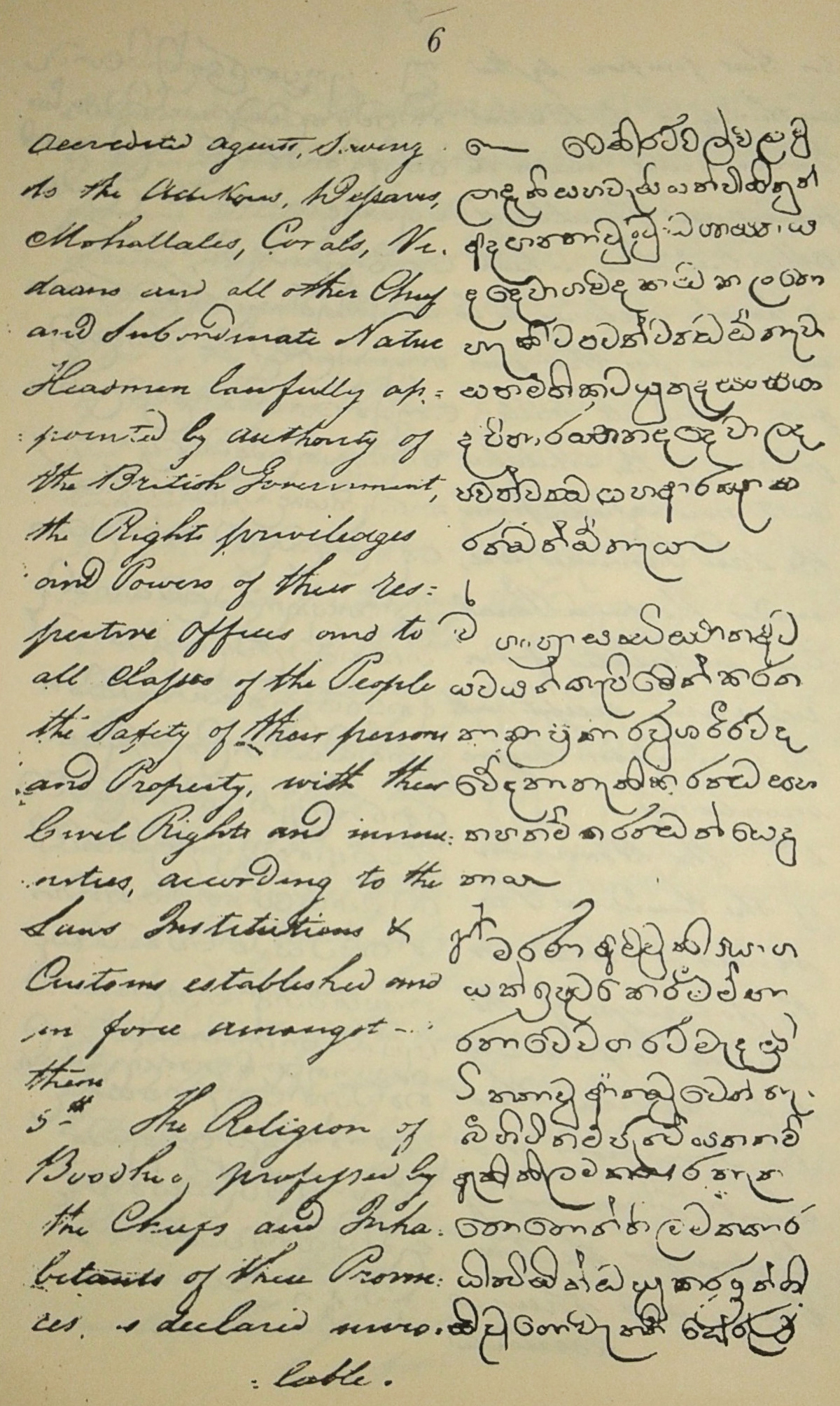
Page 6

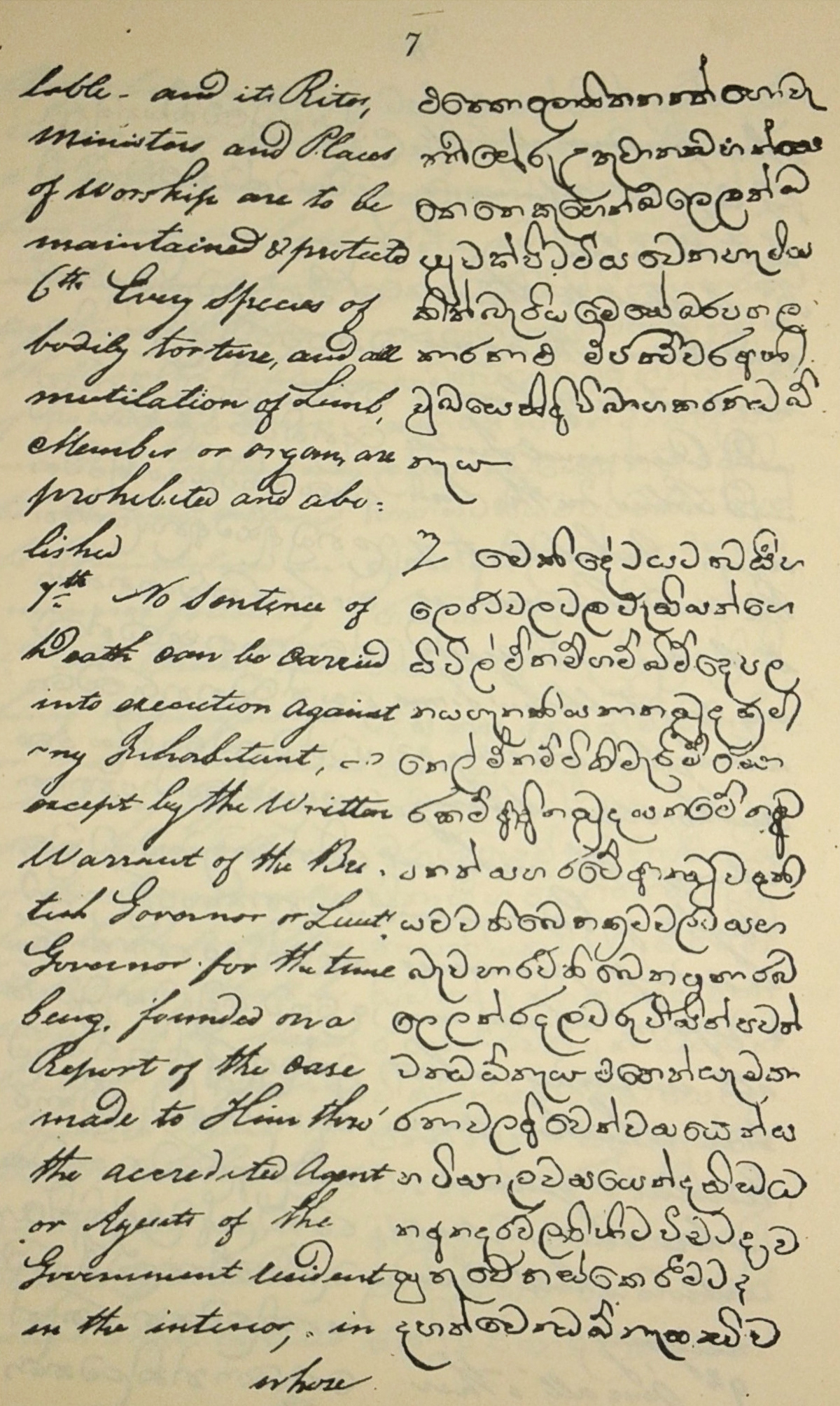
Page 7

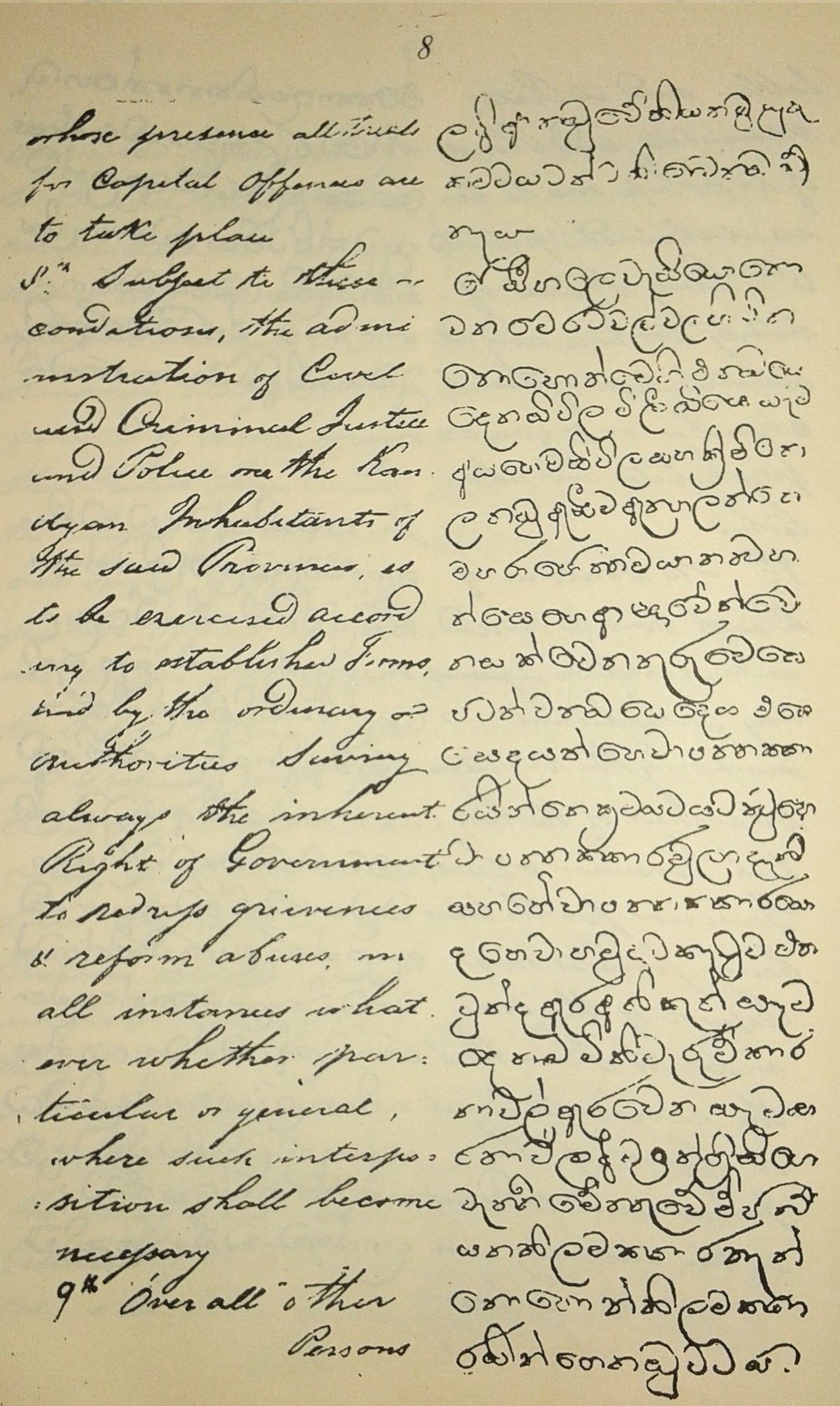
Page 8

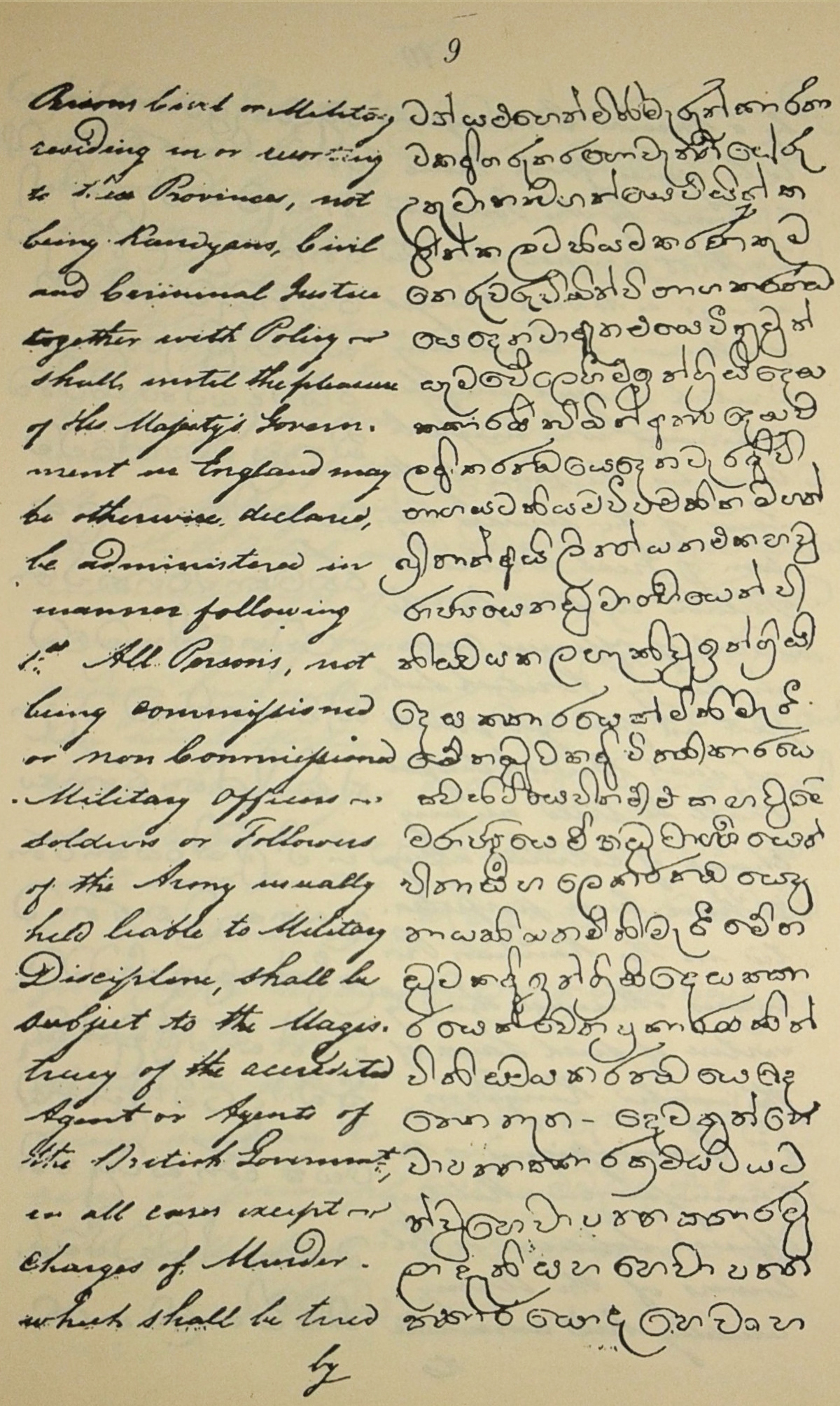
Page 9

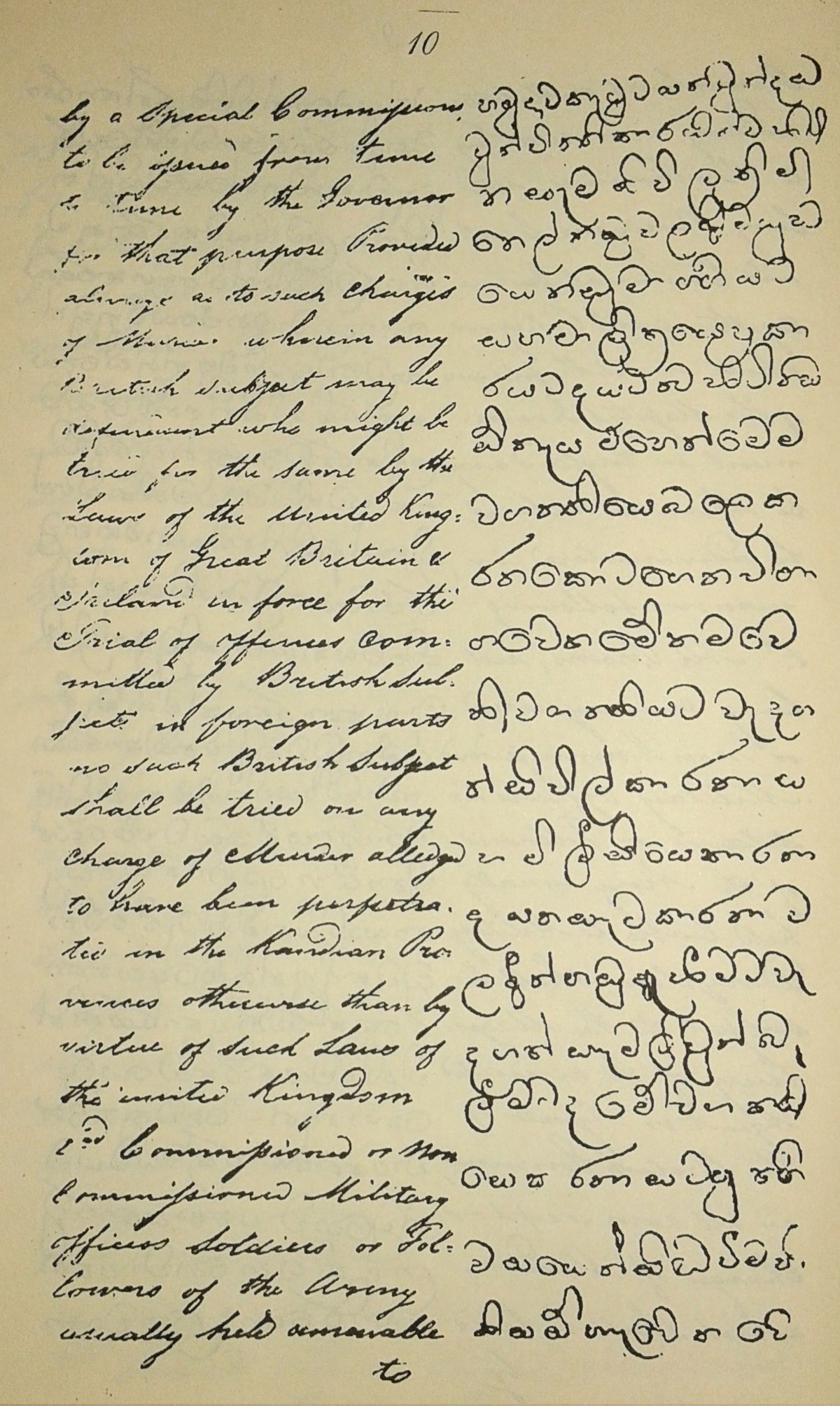
Page 10

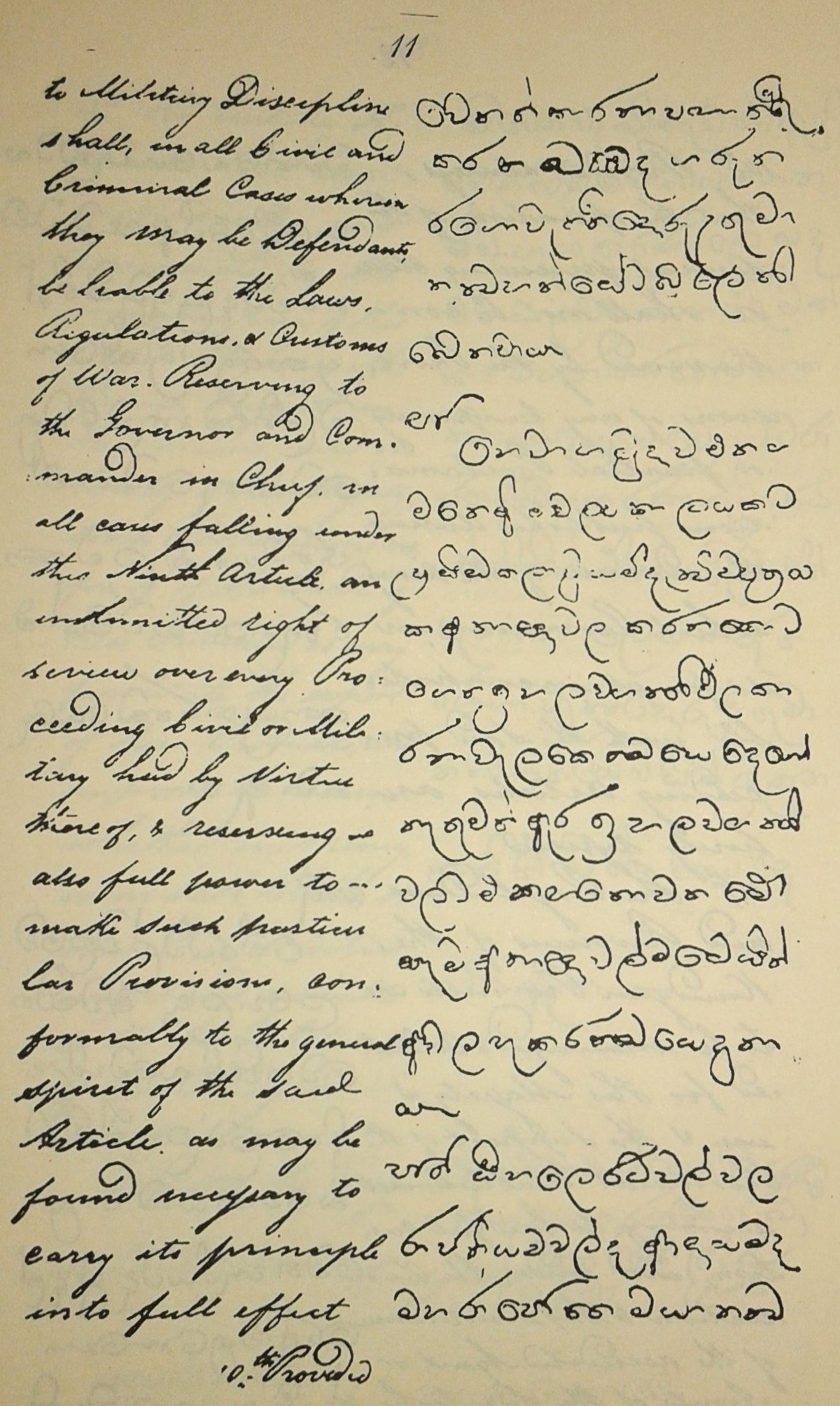
Page 11

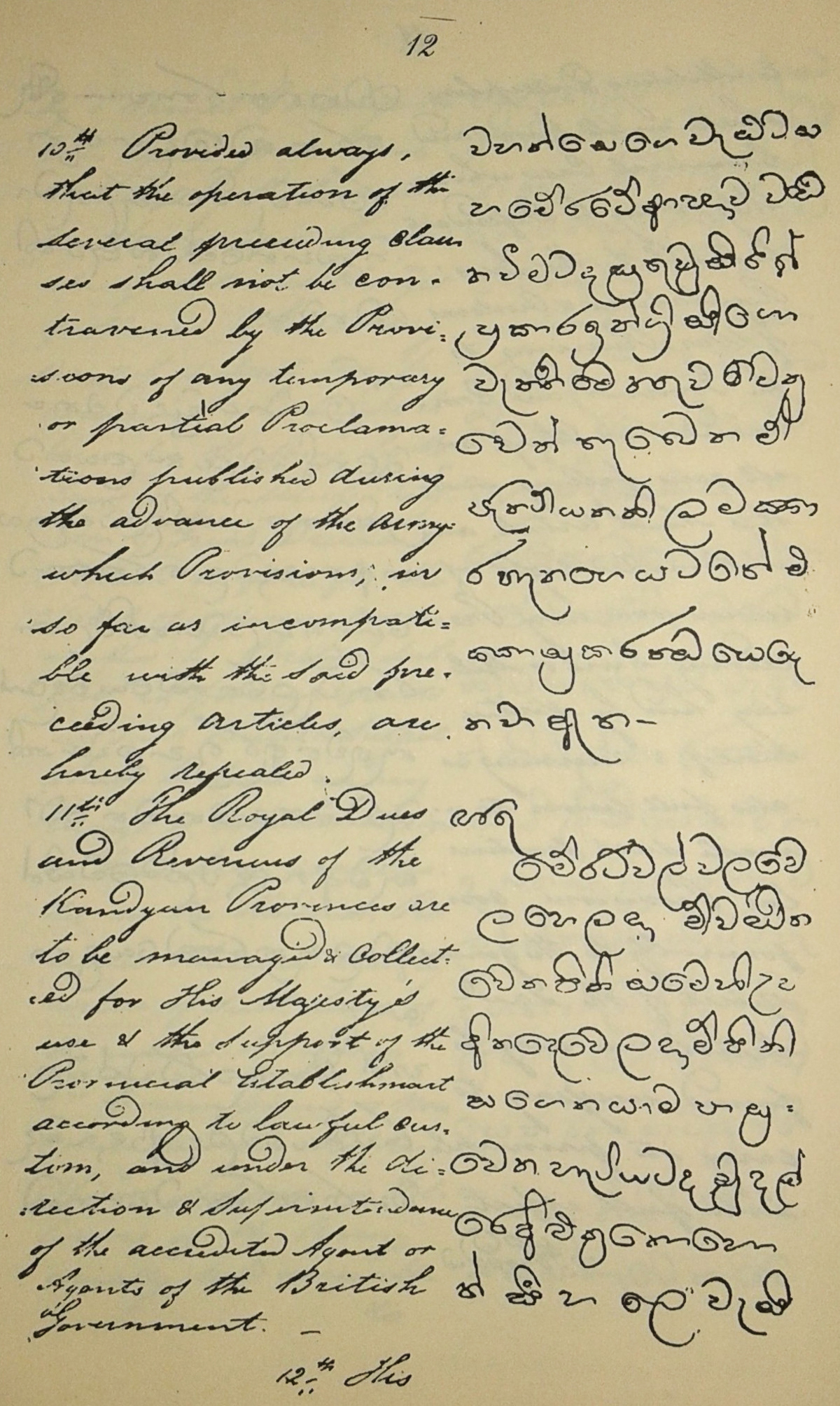
Page 12

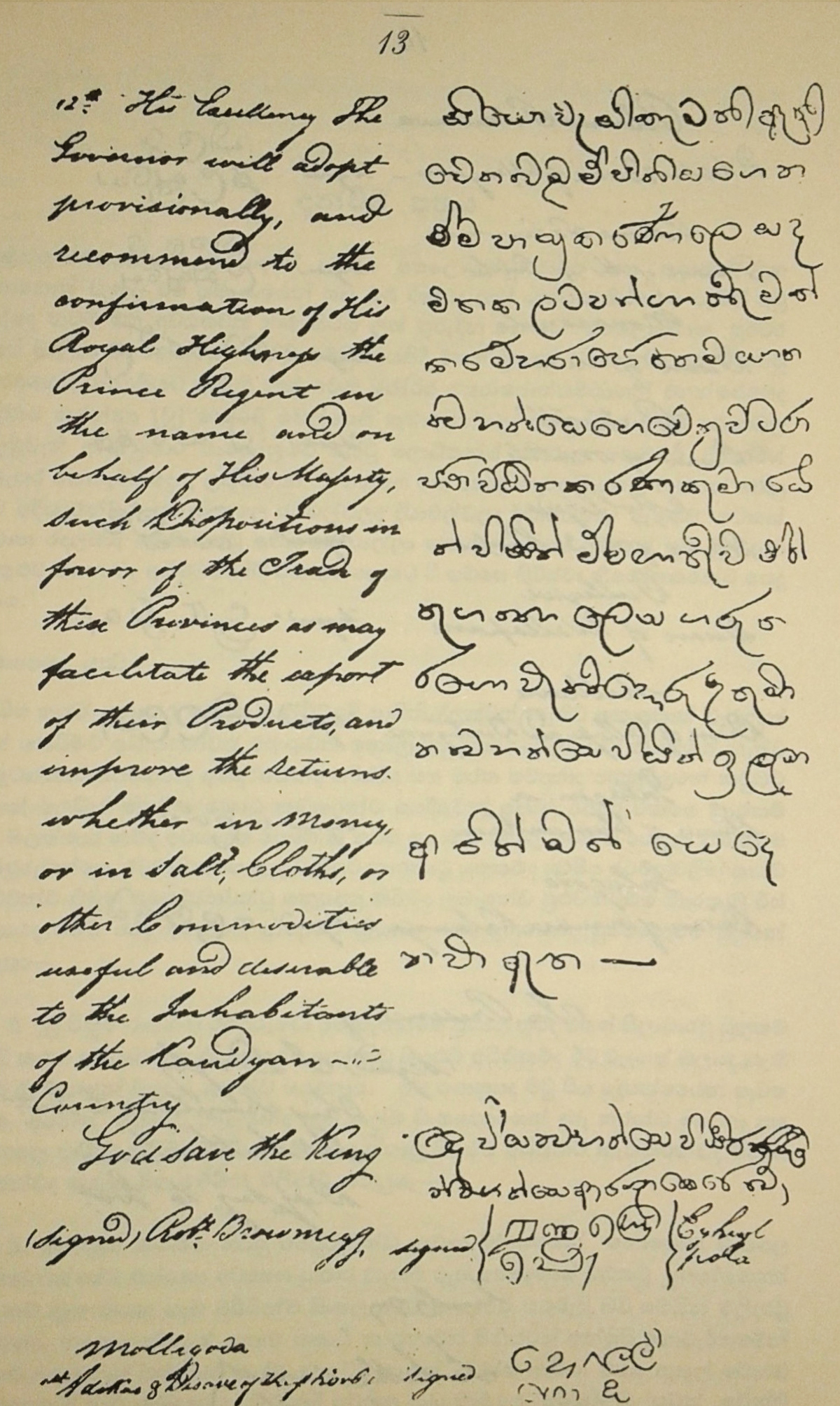
Page 13

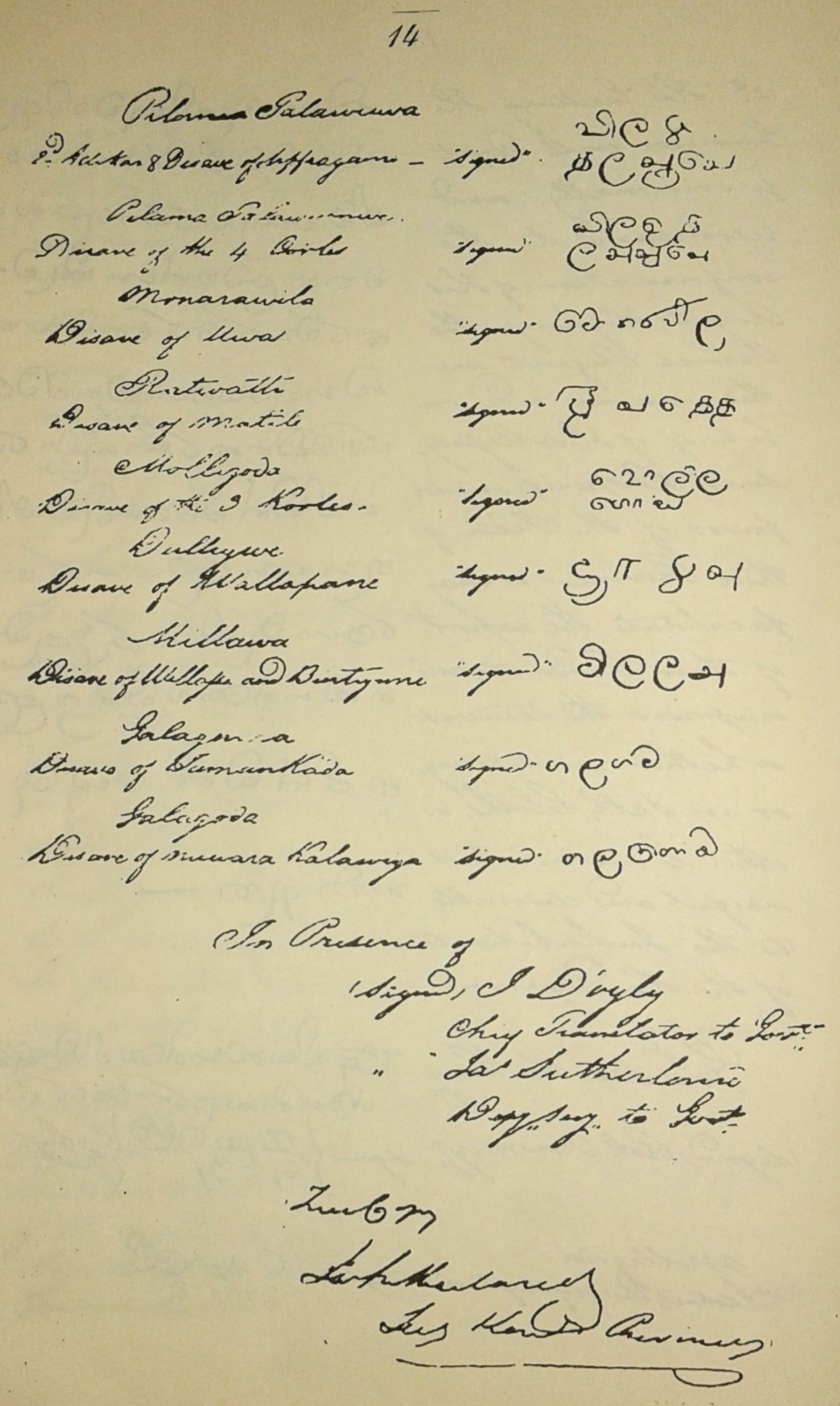
Page 14

== See also ==
- Kandyan Treaty of 1638
- Kandyan Wars

== Notes ==
1.Page 1 (Sinhala version): "..... සීහලෙ වැසියන් වෙනුවට අධිකාරන්වරු සහ සීහලෙ ර‍ටවල්වලද දිසාවල්වලට ද දිසාපතිවරු ඇතුළුව වෙනත් ප්‍රධාන රදලවරු මෙහි එක්වු මොහොට්ටාලලා කොරාලලා සහ අනිකුත් සුළු මුලාදෑනි ඇතුළුව සෙනාවද අභිමුඛයෙහිදි එක පක්ෂයකට වී ...."
