= Henry Huntly Leith Malcolm =

Scottish officer in the British Army

Brigadier-General Henry Huntly Leith Malcolm CB CMG DSO
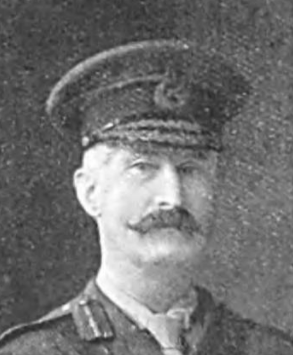
- Born: 10 December 1860; Glasgow, Scotland
- Died: 11 December 1938 (aged 78); Bournemouth, England
- Military career
- Allegiance: United Kingdom
- Branch: British Army
- Service years: 1879
- Rank: Brigadier-General
- Unit: Black Watch
- Commands: Officer Commanding the Troops, Ceylon; Seaforth and Cameron Brigade
- Conflicts: Anglo-Egyptian War; Nile Expedition; Second Boer War; World War I
- Awards: Companion of the Order of the Bath; Companion of the Order of St Michael and St George; Distinguished Service Order

Brigadier-General Henry Huntly Leith Malcolm CB CMG DSO (10 December 1860 – 11 December 1938) was a Scottish officer in the British Army during the Anglo-Egyptian War and World War I.

== Military career ==
Malcolm joined the 42nd Regiment of Foot, later the Black Watch, as a second lieutenant on 22 January 1879. This was the same regiment his grandfather, Lieutenant J. Malcolm, had served with during the Peninsular War and the Waterloo Campaign. On 29 September 1880 he became a lieutenant in the Queen's Own Cameron Highlanders and served in the Anglo-Egyptian War, including at the Battle of Tel-el-Kebir, where he was wounded twice and received the Khedive's Star. He then served on the Nile Expedition, as a staff captain with the Whaleboats and was promoted to captain in August 1885 and then to major in April 1897.

From 1900 he served in the Second Boer War in command of the 1st Battalion, Cameron Highlanders, in operations against in the Boers in the Orange Free State and Transvaal, taking part in the Battle of Diamond Hill. During the war he was mentioned in dispatches, received the Queen's South Africa Medal with four clasps, the King's South Africa Medal with two clasps and was made a Companion of the Distinguished Service Order (DSO).

He was promoted to the rank of lieutenant colonel on 2 April 1902, and appointed in command of the 2nd Battalion of his regiment following his return to the United Kingdom in June. Brevet promotion to colonel followed on 1 April 1905. On 3 April 1906, after having served as commanding officer (CO) of the battalion for four years, he relinquished command and was placed on half-pay. From 1906 to 1911 he commanded the Seaforth and Cameron Brigade in Scottish Command, having been made a colonel in 1910. In 1911 he was a colonel on half pay when he was made a Companion of the Order of the Bath in the 1911 Coronation Honours of George V.

As a Temporary Brigadier General he was appointed to command the Orange River Colony District in South Africa from October 1911 to May 1913. Still a Temporary Brigadier General he left to take up command as the Officer Commanding the Troops in Ceylon. His actions in Ceylon during the 1915 riots were heavy criticised locally following the institution of martial law by Governor Sir Robert Chalmers. With martial law declared Brigadier General Malcolm ordered strict enforcement of curfews with orders to shoot any one who they deemed a rioter without a trial. It was reported that Brigadier Malcolm had ordered his troops "not to waste ammunition, but to shoot through the heart any Sinhalese that may be found on the streets". He instituted field general courts-martials, that convicted many including Captain Henry Pedris and Edmund Hewavitarne. The later he had executed while the former died in prison. Popular discontent towards the methods undertaken to suppress the riots marked the beginning of the independence movement in Ceylon.

In September 1915, Colonel Malcolm was transferred to the western front as a Brigade Commander in the British Expeditionary Force unit December 1915. He was made a Companion of the Order of St Michael and St George in the 1916 Birthday Honours and in 1917 he returned to France as a brigade major. He was placed on half-pay on 15 November and was retired from the army on 10 December, on the grounds of 'age', and was granted the honorary rank of brigadier general.

== Family ==
Born to William Malcolm, of Glenmorag, Argyllshire and Amelia Jane, daughter of Reverend H H Holdsworth, of Fishtoft, Lincolnshire. In 1908, Colonel Malcolm married Edith, only child of Ernest E Sabel, and they had one daughter, E Betty E A Malcolm, born 22 October 1913.

Military offices
Preceded by Alfred James Whitacre Allen	Commander-in-Chief, Ceylon; May 1913 - September 1915	Succeeded by F. Hacket Thompson
