= F. B. Walgampahe =

F. B. Walgampahe (18?? - 1915) was the Basnayaka Nilame (the Lay Chief) of the Ancient Temple of Gadaladeniya in Gampola, Kandy. He was accused as an instigator of the 1915 Ceylonese Riots by Herbert Dowbiggin, the Inspector General of Police and died in the custody of the colonial authorities in the early part of the riots.

== See also ==
- 1915 Ceylonese Riots
