= R. A. Mirando =

Ceylonese industrialist and philanthropist

Richard Adrian Mirando (23 May 1854 – 2 June 1915) was a Ceylonese industrialist and philanthropist.

Richard was educated at the Colombo Academy. After completing his schooling in 1879, Mirando went into private business. He established the Mirando Company and became a successful cinnamon and graphite exporter, as well as a landed proprietor and estate owner. From 1905 to 1915, he served as the Vice-President of the Graphite Merchants United Society. An active member of the Buddhist resurgence, he was the President of the Colombo Buddhist Theosophical Society from 1892 to 1915, the first contributor to the Buddhist National Fund and served as the first manager of the Ananda College, Colombo after the English Buddhist School was renamed in 1895 and served till 1915. In addition, he was a Member Buddhist Defence Committee, a temperance leader, and a delegate to discuss the grievances of the Buddhists with the Governor of British Ceylon until 1903.

He was shot by police during the 1915 riots and died on 2 June 1915; his death was recorded as accidental. The government of Sri Lanka issued a postage stamp in his name in 1992, commemorating Mirando as a national hero.
