= Madampe =

- Country: Sri Lanka
- Province: North Western Province
- District: Puttalam District
- Time zone: UTC+5:30 (Sri Lanka Standard Time)

Madampe is a town situated in the Puttalam District, of North Western Province, Sri Lanka. Madampe is a town with historical importance which was ruled by king Thaniwallbha according to the history. There are two areas: Old town and New town which is also known as Silva town. Old town is located on Colombo - Negombo - Chilaw main road. The new town is located on Kuliyapitiya road. The old town area is mainly occupied by Muslim community and consists of many shops. Town areas are occupied by commercial users: several super markets, shops, hardware stores, restaurants and other public institutions. Middle income class residential users are mostly occupied. The road network is well developed.

== Places of Worship ==
The town has a historic Hindu and Buddhist temple. The Roman Catholic Church of St. Sebastian is also located in the town. The Senanayake temple is very famous Buddhist temple which is located facing the Colombo Chilaw main road. About 1 km away from the Galahitiyawa junction the Hindu temple named Madampe Sri Murugan Kovil is located and that place got the attraction of many local and foreign travelers.

== Coconut Plantations ==
Madampe area consist of many small, medium and large coconut plantations. Madampe has a thriving coconut industry with coir factories in the region.

== Corea house Madampe ==
Many well known Sri Lankan families have lived in Madampe, including Mudaliyar James Caulfield Herat Seneviratne and members of the Seneviratne and Corea families who lived in the historic home called 'Corea Court' near the town. The estates surrounding 'Corea Court' were given to the Seneviratne family by the King of Sri Lanka in 1758.

Mrs Gwendoline Seneviratne, daughter of Dr. James Alfred Ernest Corea, brother of the freedom fighters, Charles Edgar Corea and Victor Corea, regarded as national heroes of Sri Lanka, has lived here, so has Government Agent James Alfred Corea who was Mohandiram of Madampe. There is also the Mada Walluavva, in Madampe in Jim Munasinha Mawatha. Jim Munasinha was the previous Member of Parliament to Chilaw. Until his death in 1968.

== See also ==
- Sri Lankan Mudaliyars
- James Alfred Corea

== Bibliography ==
- Twentieth Century Impressions of Ceylon: Its History, People, Commerce, Industries and Resources By A.W. Wright, Asian Educational Services, India; New Ed edition (15 Dec 2007)
