= Muhandiram =

Post in the native topmen system in Ceylon (Sri Lanka)

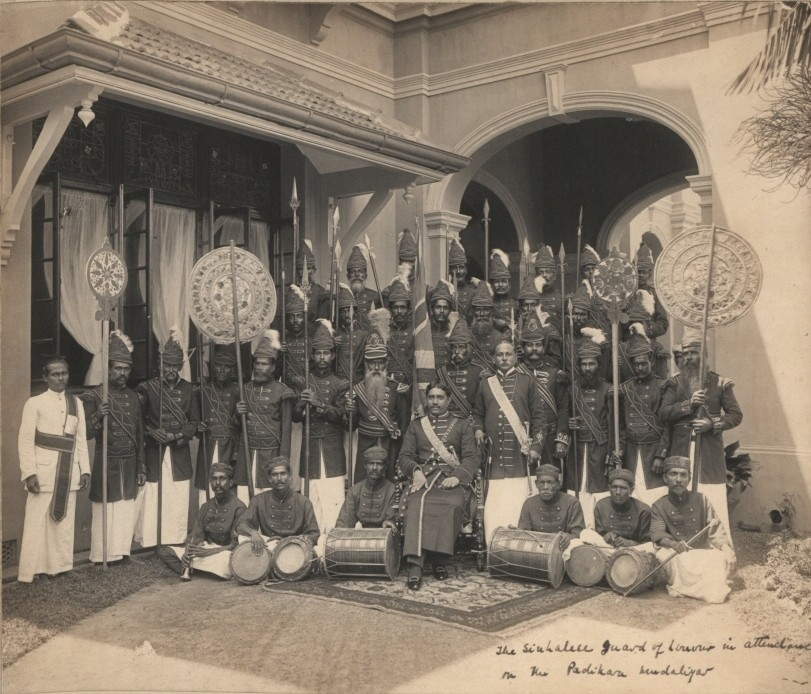
The Lascoreen Guard of Padikara Muhandiram Arthur Silva Wijeyasinghe Siriwardena

Muhandiram (Sinhala: මුහන්දිරම්, Tamil: முகாந்திரம்) was a post in the native headmen system in the lower-country (coastal districts) of Ceylon (Sri Lanka) during the colonial era. It was awarded as a title of honor until suspension of Ceylonese honours in 1956.

== History ==
The post originated from the Portuguese colonial administration in the 17th century by enlisting natives of different castes from the coastal areas. The post continued throughout the Dutch East India Company administration and the British colonial administration until the abolition of the native department in the 1930s. It was awarded as a title of honor until the suspension of Celonese honors in 1956.

During the British administration official and titular appointments were made by the government agent of the district to a korale which was a revenue district; a muhandiram had several vidane arachchies that may come under his supervision. He would report to the mudaliyar of the korale or atapattu (district) and was subordinate to the assistant government agents and other civil servants. Appointments were non-transferable and usually hereditary, made to locals, usually from wealthy influential families loyal to the British Crown. This was an influential post, as the holder had much control over the populace of a korale and wielded quasi-judicial powers since he was responsible for keeping the peace, carrying out revenue collection and assisting in judicial functions.

Their uniform was similar to that of the mudaliyars, with a long black tunic buttoned up to the neck with golden loops and buttons, a gold lave sword belt and decorated sword.

== Ranks of the British Muhandirams ==
Muhandirams had several classes:

Awarded as an honor (titular)

- Muhandiram of the Governor's Gate (titular) - awarded as an Honor
- Muhandiram (titular) - awarded as an Honor
- Vidane Muhandirams (titular) - awarded as an Honor
- Veda Muhandirams (titular) - awarded as an honor for native physicians
- Guru Muhandirams (titular) - awarded as an honor for native teachers

Official

- Muhandiram of the atapattu - in charge of a jurisdiction of a district
- Muhandiram of the korale - in charge of a jurisdiction of a korale

Ex-offico posts attached to other public departments or ceremonial roles

- Gravets muhandiram - jurisdiction of a town and gravets
- Basnayaka muhandiram - command of a Lascoreen Guard
- Liyana muhandiram - head of the clerks
- Madige muhandiram - regional transportation representative for the governor

Singular appointments

- Padikara muhandiram
- Mohotti muhandiram
- Dadayakkare muhandiram

== List of prominent Muhandirams ==
=== Official ===
==== Madige Muhandiram ====
- Madige Muhandiram Haji Marikkar Travala (d:1817) of Wellassa - murderd by Kandyan Sinhalese rebels during the Great Rebellion of 1817–18
- Madige Muhandiram Galagaha Vidanalagegedara Seyed Mohamed Lebbe Marikar (1840-1939) of Kandy
- Madige Muhandiram M. K. Abdul Hameed of Kurunegala
- Madige Muhandiram Mohammed Salie of Kotiyakumbura

=== Awarded as an honor (titular) ===
==== Muhandiram of the Governor's Gate ====
- Gate Muhandiram Don William Adrian Dias Bandaranaike of Malwana (1776)
- Gate Muhandiram Arnold Paul Goonewardene of Kalutara
- Gate Muhandiram Peter Thomas de Saram Wirasinghe Siriwardena (1853-1910) of Mount Lavinia

==== Muhandiram ====
- Muhandiram Wickrema Arachchige Don Thomas Wickremasinghe
- Muhandiram Andiris Perera Dharmagunawardhana (1809–1890)
- Muhandiram Auwakkar Isse of Sammanthurai
- Muhandiram James Alfred Corea (1871-????) of Madampe
- Muhandiram T. Sathasiva Iyer (1882-1950)
- Padikara Muhandiram Don Pedris Francis Abeywickrama (1886-1966) of Morawaka Korale. Writer and Poet.
- Muhandiram Tuan Kitchil AbuCassim Burah
- Muhandiram Ibra Lebbe Sulaiman Lebbe (1893-1964) of Kurikotuwa Maddeketiya Korale
- Muhandiram Don Justin Peter Senarathna (1899-1985)
- Muhandiram M. K. Mahmood Lebbe alias Thalama of Ibbagamuwa. (1910-1981)
- Muhandiram Brahmanawatte Mawathage Lloyd Seneviratne - Founding Chairman of Dehiwela Mt Lavinia Council

== See also ==
- Native headmen of Ceylon
- Mudaliyar
- Arachchi
- Walauwa
- Kastane
