= Vidane =

Petty native headman or rural police constable in colonial Ceylon

The Vidane or Vithanai was a petty native headman or a rural police constable in Ceylon (Sri Lanka) during the colonial era. Appointed by the Government Agent of the Province. The holder had much control over the people of the area and wielded quasi-judicial powers since he was responsible to keep the peace, carry out revenue collection and assist in judicial functions.

Appointments were non-transferable and usually hereditary, made to locals, usually from wealthy influential families loyal to the British Crown.

== History ==
=== Origins ===
The post was in existence before the Colonial Rule of Sri Lanka (Ceylon). After the coastal areas were taken over by the Colonial Rulers i.e. Portuguese, Dutch colonial rule and finally the British, they retained the post in their administration system.

=== British period ===
During the British administration, appointments were made by the Government Agent of the Province. Appointments were non-transferable and usually hereditary, made to locals, usually from wealthy influential families loyal the British Crown. This was an influential post, the holder had much control over the people of the area and had limited police powers since he was responsible to keep the peace, carry out revenue collection and assist in judicial functions. This became part of the Native Department of the British Government of Ceylon.

Several Vidanes (විදානේ) came under the supervision of a Vidane Arachchi (විදානෙ ආරච්චි) in Low Country and under the supervision of Udayar in Tamil Area.

=== Reforms and abolition ===
Following the formation of the State Council of Ceylon in 1931, one of its members, H. W. Amarasuriya, called for an inquiry into the Native Headman System. A commission was formed made up of retired civil servants and lawyers headed by H.M. Wedderburn. The commission reported on reforming the headman system or replacing it with transferable District Revenue Officers. The Native Headman System was abolished as an administrative system, with the titles of Mudaliyar (Mudali - මුදලි) and Muhandiram retained by government to be awarded as honors. This practice remained until suspension of Celanese honors in 1956. The minor headman positions were retained, surviving well into the 1970s when the posts of Vidane (විදානේ) in Low Country / Tamil Area and Town Arachchi (ටවුන් ආරච්චි) / Gan Arachchi (ගන් ආරච්චි) in Kandyan Area were replaced with the transferable post of Grama Niladhari (Village Officer).

== Types of the British Vidanes ==
- Vidane - a village or a group of small villages placed under his administration. Vidane was a Low Country headman ranking immediately below that of a Vidane Arachchi in Low Country and below that of a Udayar in Tamil Area in the Native Headmen System. A Vidane was equivalent in ranking to the Kandyan Areas headmen Town Arachchi or a Gan Arachchi
- Police vidane - in charge of police duties in the Village under the supervision of the vidane
- Vel vidane - in charge of distributing water from the wewa (tank) to villagers for cultivation under the supervision of the vidane
- Seeni Viande - in charge of distributing Sugar under the supervision of the vidane

== List of Prominent Vidanes ==
=== Vidane ===
- Muhammad Hajie Marikar Vidane of Athikaragoda, Alutgama
- Mathicham Saleem Lebbe Muhammedh Thamby Vidane (1819–1879) of Negombo
- Avoo Lebbe Marikar Vidane (1836–1906) of Thihariya

=== Police Vidane ===
- Hassan Meera Lebbe Police Vidane of Kahatowita
- W.P Sodina was the police vidane in Kirindiwela, Gampaha District, Western Province
- Monis Wijayasundara was the police vidane in Melagama, Wadduwa, Kalutara District, Sri Lanka

=== Seeni Vidane ===
- Mohammed Meera Lebbe Seeni Vidane of Kalmunaikudy

== See also ==
- Native headmen of Ceylon
- Arachchi
- Grama Niladhari
- Walauwa

== References and external links ==
- Twentieth Century Impressions of Ceylon
- A vignette of British Justice in Colonial Ceylon
- The Mudaliyars Explained
- Our Man in Cochin
- "Village notables in colonial Ceylon - The Village Headman was the uncrowned king of the village. He was appointed by the Government Agent from a traditional leading family in the area, in order to ensure that he received customary respect from villagers".
