= Arachchi =

Petty native headman in Ceylon

Arachchi (Sinhala: ආරච්චි) was a native headman in Ceylon (Sri Lanka) during the colonial era. Appointed by the Government Agent of the Province, the holder had much control over the people of the area and wielded quasi-judicial powers since he was responsible to keep the peace, carry out revenue collection and assist in judicial functions.

Appointments were non-transferable and usually hereditary, made to locals, usually from wealthy influential families loyal to the British Crown.

The term Arachchi was also used to refer to a supervisory peon serving in government offices such as a Kachcheri or a District Court. It is no longer in use.

== History ==
=== Origins ===
The post was in existence before the Colonial Rule of Sri Lanka (Ceylon). After the coastal areas were taken over by the Colonial Rulers i.e. Portuguese, Dutch colonial rule and finally the British, they retained the post in their administration system.

=== British period ===
During the British administration, appointments were made by the Government Agent of the Province. Appointments were non-transferable and usually hereditary, made to locals, usually from wealthy influential families loyal the British Crown. This was an influential post, the holder had much control over the people of the area and had limited police powers since he was responsible to keep the peace, carry out revenue collection and assist in judicial functions. This became part of the Native Department of the British Government of Ceylon.

Several Vidanes came under the supervision of a Vidane Arachchi in Low Country and under the supervision of Udayar in Tamil Area.The Headman Commission of 1922 states that “under the existing system each village or group of small villages is placed under the supervision of minor headman known as Gam Arachchi in Kandyan areas and police vidane or police headman in low country. The positions above those headmen were Korala in Kandyan districts; Uddaiyar in Tamil districts Vidane Arachchi in districts of low country. The top rank above all officials was represented by “Rate Mahatmaya, and Adigars in Kandyyan districts, Maniyagars and Vanniyars in Tamil Districts and Mudliers in southern provinces.

=== Reforms and abolition ===
Following the formation of the State Council of Ceylon in 1931, one of its members, H. W. Amarasuriya, called for an inquiry into the Native Headman System. A commission was formed made up of retired civil servants and lawyers headed by H.M. Wedderburn. The commission reported on reforming the headman system or replacing it with transferable District Revenue Officers. The Native Headman System was abolished as an administrative system, with the titles of Mudaliyar (Mudali - මුදලි) and Muhandiram retained by government to be awarded as honors. This practice remained until suspension of Celanese honors in 1956. The minor headman positions were retained, surviving well into the 1970s when the posts of Vidane (විදානේ) in Low Country / Tamil Area and Town Arachchi (ටවුන් ආරච්චි) / Gan Arachchi (ගන් ආරච්චි) in Kandyan Area were replaced with the transferable post of Grama Niladhari (Village Officer).

== Types of British Arachchies ==
British appointed Arachchies had several classes;

=== Headmen ===
==== Low Country ====
===== Vidane Arachchi (විදානෙ ආරච්චි) =====
A Vidane Arachchi had several Vidanes under his supervision

==== Kandyan Areas ====
===== Town Arachchi (ටවුන් ආරච්චි) =====
A Town Arachchi had a Town or group of small villages placed under his Administration

===== Gan Arachchi (ගන් ආරච්චි) =====
A Gan Arachchi had a village or group of small villages placed under his Administration

== List of Prominent Arachchies ==
=== Headmen ===
==== Low Country ====
===== Vidane Arachchi (විදානෙ ආරච්චි) =====
A Vidane Arachchi had several Vidanes under his supervision

- Susewhewage Hamiyel Fernando Appuhamy Vidane Arachchi a.k.a. Molligoda Arachchi (b. c. 1820), Molligoda Walauwa Wadduwa
- Susewhewage Girigoris Fernando Appuhamy Waskaduwa Vidane Arachchi (1835–1905) Punchikachcheriya, Pothupitiya
- Naorunnage Don Adiriyan De Silva Vidane Arachchi(1850-1925)Dickwella
- Muhammedh Thamby Samsudheen Vidane Arachchi a.k.a. Dheen Arachchi (1860–1915) of Negombo
- Ali Thamby Abbas Lebbe Vidane Arachchi of Kal-Eliya
- I. L. M. Usuph Vidane Arachchi of Hanmbantota
- Susewhewage Simon Fernando Dharmasena Weerasinghe Pothupitiya Vidane Arachchi (1870–1934) Pattikarawasala Walauwa Pothupitiya
- Don Jakolis Rupasinghe Gunawardena Boralugoda Vidane Arachchi (1879–1947) of Boralugoda
- Gamage Don Gunasekera Vidane Arachchi (1879-????) of Werahera, Boralesgamuwa
- Don David Rajapaksa Vidane Arachchi of Ihala Valikada Korale, Giruvapattuva
- Don Dharmis Rathnasinghe Vidane Arachchi of Mandiyagoda Walauwa, Pallattara, Dakunu Giruvapattuva
- Don Hendrick Abeywickrama Vidane Arachchi of Morawaka
- Samarathunga Arachchige Don Abraham Karunaratne Vidane Arachchi a.k.a. Wawulhena Maha Nilame Ralahami (b. circa 1910) of Sivirulumulla, Nedungamuwa.

==== Kandyan Areas ====
===== Town Arachchi (ටවුන් ආරච්චි) =====
Town Arachchi had a Town or group of small villages placed under his Administration

- Samsudeen Town Arachchi (1892-1956) of Danowita
- Unus Ibunu Muhammed Abdul Razzak Town Arachchi (1895–1972) of Nelundeniya
- Ahamed Lebbe Muhammed Junaid Town Arachchi (1914-1995) of Thulhiriya

===== Gan Arachchi (ගන් ආරච්චි) =====
Gan Arachchi had a village or group of small villages placed under his Administration

- Harambage Lasis Fernando Gunawardena Gan Arachchi (1850-1910) of Kalamulla, Kaluthara
- Karunanayaka Mudiyanselage Appuhami Gan Arachchi of Akwatta
- Samarasinha Herat Mudiyanselage Tikiri Banda Gan Arachchi of Makura
- Siriwurdana Padidora Mudiyanselage Appuhami Gan Arachchi of Burunnawa
- Hetti Mudiyanselage Dingiri Appuhami Gan Arachchi of Rabbidigala
- Meerakkandu Muhandiramala Abdul Rahiman Lebbe Gan Arachchi of Udatalawinna
- Dambagolle Vidanele Omerudeen Lebbe Gan Arachchi of Udatalawinna
- Galagaha Vidanalage Gedara Ismail Marikkar Grama Aarachchi of Mawanella
- Galagawa Vidanele Seyado Mabammado Lebbe Gan Arachchi Madawalamadige

=== Awarded as an honor (Titular) ===
==== Gate Arachchi ====
- Pawalkodi Ismail Lebbe Marikar Mathicham Muhammad Abdullah Headman, Titular Arachchi of Matara

== See also ==
- Native headmen of Ceylon
- Muhandiram
- Vidane
- Walauwa
