= Native headmen of Ceylon =

Kandyan agricultural serfs
Regions with significant populations
- Sri Lanka

Languages
- Sinhala language, Tamil Language & English Language

Religion
- Predominantly: Theravada Buddhism and Hindu, Islam, Catholic Minoroites

Related ethnic groups
- South Asian ethnic groups - Sinhalese people Sri Lankan Tamils, Sri Lankan Moors, Sri Lankan Malays and Burgher People

The native headmen system was an integral part of the administration of the island of Ceylon (now known as Sri Lanka) under the successive European colonial powers, namely the Portuguese Empire, the Dutch East India Company and the British Empire. Native headmen or leaders were appointed by the European colonial administrators to function as intermediates between the Europeans and the native populace. During different periods through this system these headmen functioned in military, policing, administrative and ceremonial capacities. They served as translators and revenue collectors, and wielded quasi-judicial powers. Much of the system evolved and changed over time until some of the last vestiges of it were removed in the post-independent Ceylon.

== History ==
=== Origins ===
The native headmen system was an integral part of the administration of the island of Ceylon (now known as Sri Lanka) under the successive European colonial powers, namely the Portuguese Empire, the Dutch East India Company and the British Empire. Native headmen or leaders were appointed by the European colonial administrators to function as intermediates between the Europeans and the native populace. During different periods through this system these headmen functioned in military, policing, administrative and ceremonial capacities. They served as translators and revenue collectors, and wielded quasi-judicial powers. Much of the system evolved and changed over time until some of the last vestiges of it were removed in the post-independent Ceylon.

=== British period ===
With the onset of British rule, Governor North restructured the native headmen system. The system was transformed into a salaried system with land grants and tenured service abolished. They became the second tier of the civil administration of the island, with appointments made by the Governor. Over the next century, the headmen grew to be a powerful and affluent class, consolidating economic power through land ownership and marriage. Gradually functions of headmen were transferred to various departments that were established by the British administration.

Every district is subdivided into Pattus or Korales. These Pattus are divided into villages, hamlets, etc. Pattus are presided over by Mudaliyars and Muhandirams in low country districts, Ratemahattayas and Korales in the Kandyan provinces, Maniyars and Udayars in the Tamil districts. The villages and hamlets are in the charge of Arachchies, Peace Officers and Vidanes

Following the Uva Rebellion in 1818 and changes to the administrative divisions of the island with the creation of Districts, British Government Agents (GA) took over the duties of the Dissava (with the remaining and newly appointed Dissavas being mere honorary titles), with Rate Mahatmaya becoming a subordinate to the local Government Agents and Assistant Government Agents. In the same way, after 1818 the position of the remaining and newly appointed Adigar became a mere honorary title.

The Headman Commission of 1922 states that "under the existing system each village or group of small villages is placed under the supervision of minor headman known as Gam Arachchi in Kandyan areas and police vidane or police headman in low country. The positions above those headmen were Korala in Kandyan districts; Uddaiyar in Tamil districts Vidane Arachchi in districts of low country. The top rank above all officials was represented by Rate Mahatmaya, and Adigars in Kandyyan districts, Maniyagars and Vanniyars in Tamil Districts and Mudliers in southern provinces".

For purposes of general administration, the Island is divided into nine provinces and nineteen Revenue (which are also electoral) Districts. The provinces are under Government Agents, most of whom are aided by Assistant Government Agents, the latter residing at the headquarters of districts which are not the headquarters of provinces. The districts are divided into chief headmen's divisions, of which there are 110; these contain some 613 subdivisions under superior headmen, and the subdivisions include about 4,000 villages and hamlets each under a village headman. The chief, superior and village headmen are known by different titles in the Kandyan, Low-Country Sinhalese and Tamil districts.

During the British colonial administration of Ceylon, when uniformed policing by the Ceylon Police Force in rural areas of the island was limited, the Government Agent of the Province would appoint Headmen as Peace Officers with police powers to keep the peace. "Peace Officer" were headmen appointed by a Government Agent in writing to perform rural police duties.

=== Reforms and abolition ===
Following the formation of the State Council of Ceylon in 1931, one of its members, H. W. Amarasuriya, called for an inquiry into the headman system. A commission was formed made up of retired civil servants and lawyers headed by H.M. Wedderburn. The commission reported on reforming the headman system or replacing it with a transferable appointment. Based on the recommendations of the Wedderburn commission report, the government closed the native department in 1937, thus abolishing the posts of district headmen and replacing these with that of transferable District Revenue Officer (DRO). Serving headmen were given the option of early retirement on the basis of abolition of office or to continue in their jurisdiction as the DRO. The titles of Mudaliyar (Mudali - මුදලි) and Muhandiram were retained by government to be awarded as honors. This practice remained until suspension of Ceylonese honors in 1956 by S. W. R. D. Bandaranaike. The minor headman positions remained until these were replaced with the transferable post of Grama Sevaka in May 1963 as part of the public administration reforms carried out by Minister Felix Dias Bandaranaike in the Sirimavo Bandaranaike government. All serving village headman were re-designated as Grama Sevakas under the Village Headmen (Change of Designation) Act, No. 6 of 1964. The designation modeled on that of public servant was later changed to grama niladhari which translated to village leader.

== Classes of headmen ==
=== Classes of headmen in the low country ===
The headmen system in the coastal and low country evolved over time under the colonial administration of the Portuguese, the Dutch and then the British.

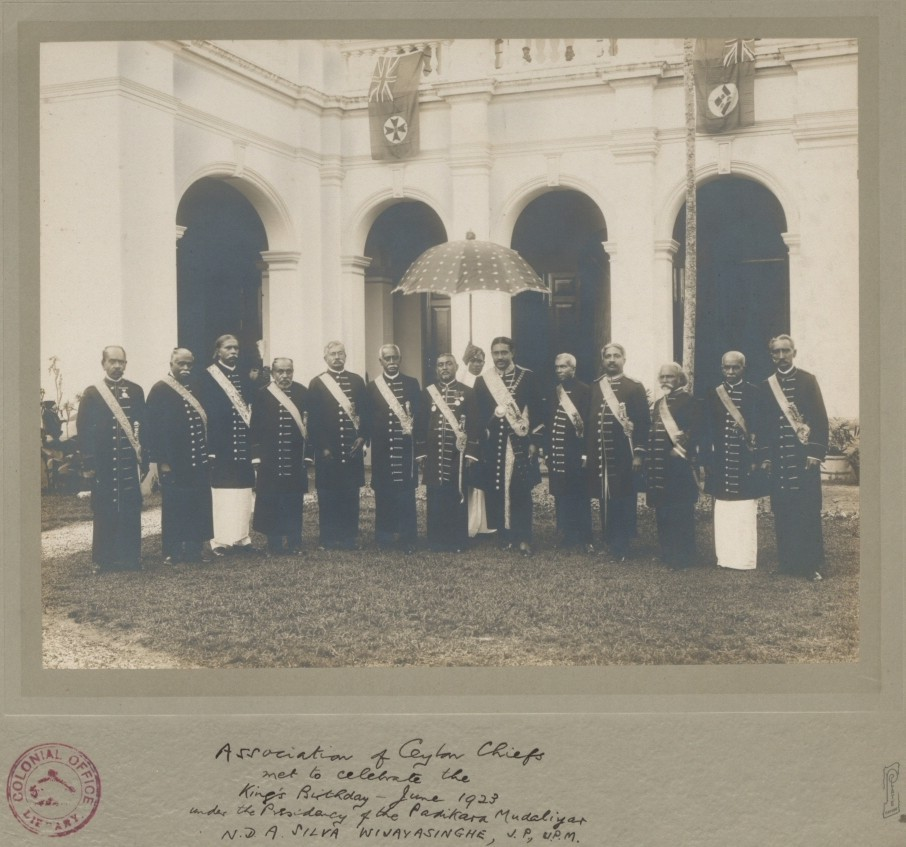
Mudaliyars of the Association of Ceylon Chiefs met to celebrate the King's birthday in June 1923

==== Chief headmen ====
- Maha Mudaliyar – (Head Mudaliyar or මහ මුදලි) - Head of the low country native headmen and native aide-de-camp to the Governor of Ceylon.
- Korale Mudaliyar (Korale Mudali – කෝරලේ මුදලි) - Korale Mudaliyar was in charge of an area known as a Korale and had several Muhandirams under his supervision
- Muhandiram (මුහන්දිරම්) - Muhandiram had several Vidane Arachchis under his supervision.

==== Minor headmen ====
- Vidane Arachchi (විදානෙ ආරච්චි) - Vidane Arachchi had several Vidanes under his supervision
- Vidane (විදානෙ) - Vidane had a village or group of small villages placed under his administration

=== Classes of headmen in the Kandyan Areas ===
A group of British appointed Kandyan chiefs, with Hon. J. P. Lewis, Government Agent in 1905.

Following the Uva Rebellion in 1818 and changes to the administrative divisions of the island with the creation of Districts, British Government Agents (GA) took over the duties of the Dissava (with the remaining and newly appointed Dissavas being mere honorary titles), with Rate Mahatmaya becoming a subordinate to the local Government Agents and Assistant Government Agents. In the same way, after 1818 the position of the remaining and newly appointed Adigar (Maha Adigar or 1st Adigar) became mere honorary titles.

==== Chief headmen ====
- Adigar - Honorary appointment
- Dissava - British Government Agent of the Province took over the duties of a Dissava (with the remaining and newly appointed Dissavas being mere honorary appointments) in 1818. Rate Mahatmayas under his supervision.
- Rate Mahatmaya (රටෙි මහත්තයා) - Rate Mahatmaya had several Korale Mahatmayas under his supervision.

==== Minor headmen ====
- Korale Mahaththaya (කෝරලේ මහත්තයා) - Korale Mahattaya was in charge of an area known as Korale and had several Gran Arachchis / Town Arachchis under his supervision.
- Town Arachchi (ටවුන් ආරච්චි) / Gan Arachchi (ගන් ආරච්චි) - Town Arachchi / Gan Arachchi had a Town / a village or group of small villages placed under his Administration

=== Classes of headmen in Tamil Areas ===
The Northern and Eastern provinces had the following classes of native headmen:

==== Chief headmen ====
- Atikar (அதிகாரி)
- Vanniyar (වන්නියා) (பண்டாரத்தார்) - The Vanniyar, also spelled Vanniya had several Maniyagar under his supervision.
- Maniyagar - Maniyagar had several Udayar's under his supervision.

==== Minor headmen ====
- Udayar - Udayar had several Vidane's under his supervision.
- Vidane (விதானை) - Vidane had a village or group of small villages placed under his Administration.

== See also ==
- Kachcheri
- Walauwa
- Grama Niladhari
- Kandyan Convention
- Great Rebellion of 1817–18
- Matale rebellion
- Maldivian Annual Tribute
