= Crown Lands Ordinance =

The Crown Lands (Encroachments) Ordinance No. 12 of 1840 also known as the Crown Lands Ordinance was an ordinance by the British Colonial Government of Ceylon that declared all lands as crown lands if ownership cannot be proved. The law deprived many who had been using the land over many generations, by providing legal means for the District Court to "to issue summons, hear evidence, and order the delivery of land to the Crown if encroachment is proven" and deal punishment by means of fines and imprisonment.

Cluse 6 of the Ordinance, claimed all forest, waste, unoccupied or uncultivated lands are presumed to be crown land, until proven to the contrary. While all chenas and lands cultivated after an interval of several years, if situated elsewhere in the island were deemed to be forest or waste land, if situated in the Kandian Provinces were considered to be crown land. In case of chenas and lands cultivated after an interval of several years that was considered crown land, private ownership could be claimed by production of sannas with satisfactory evidence of the boundaries or customary taxes, dues or services rendered within twenty years from private proprietors in the same district.

The Crown Lands Ordinance was designed and used by government officials like George Turnour as the chief instrument for securing land for plantations. It allowed the colonial government to claim all uncultivated and unoccupied land, unless the natives could prove ownership by a stringent criteria. The land that was acquired by the colonial government as crown land was given as free grants to planters and thereafter sold at a nominal fee of 5 shillings an acre, until it was increased to one pound an acre in 1844. By mid 1840's the Colonial Office in London found the civil servants neglecting their official duties due to their involvement in coffee plantations. Crown Lands Ordinance deprived the Kandyan pleasantly of their traditional lands, making them landless and destitute, by depriving the practice of cultivating the land which they enjoyed under the kings of the Kingdom of Kandy which was considered communal land that failed ownership claims under cluse 6 of the Ordinance. The law and subsequent plantation industry lead to the Matale rebellion.

== See also ==
- Waste Lands Ordinance
- Land Development Ordinance
- Land Settlement Ordinance
