= Waste Lands Ordinance =

Sri Lankan law

The Waste Lands Ordinance No.1 of 1897 also known as the Waste Lands Ordinance was an ordinance by the British Colonial Government of Ceylon to consolidate and reinforce the Crown Lands Ordinance of 1840 that introduced crown lands. The Waste Lands Ordinance defined any land classified as “forest, waste, unoccupied, or uncultivated” as crown land, unless proven otherwise. This provision effectively expropriated communal resources such as village commons and chena fields, leading up to the Kandyan Uprising of 1848. Under the new law, Government Agent and after 1903, officials from the Land Settlement Department were granted authority to adjudicate claims to waste lands. It was repealed by the Land Settlement Ordinance of 1931.

== See also ==
- Crown Lands Ordinance
- Land Development Ordinance
- Land Settlement Ordinance
