= Agalawatta =

Suburb in Sri Lanka

- Suburb
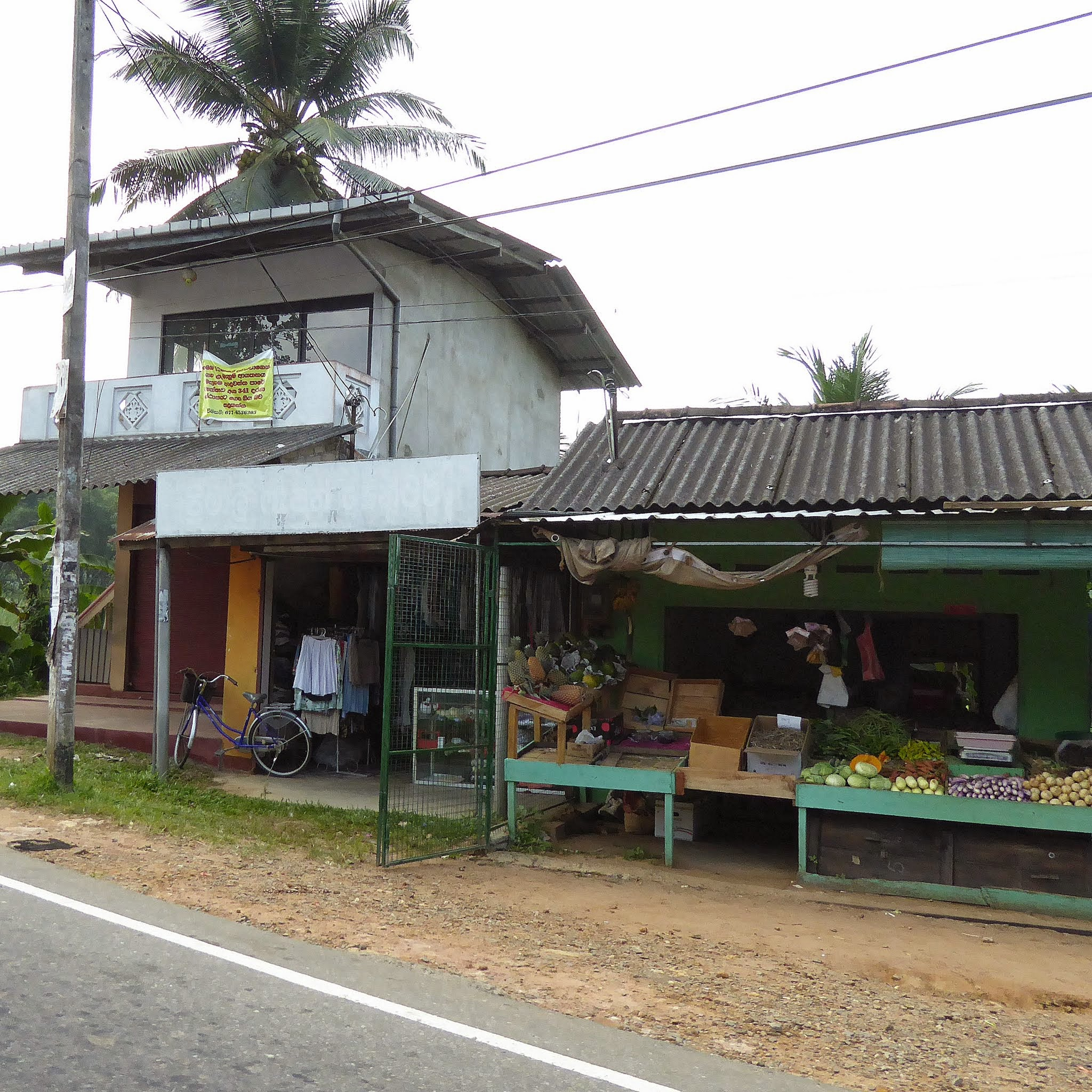

- Location within Sri Lanka
- Coordinates: 7°28′47″N 80°36′21″E
- Country: Sri Lanka
- Province: Central Province
- District: Matale District
- Divisional Secretariat: Matale Divisional Secretariat

Government
  - Type: Matale Municipal Council
- Time zone: UTC+5:30 (Sri Lanka Standard Time)

Agalawatta is a suburb of Matale in Matale District, Central Province, Sri Lanka. It is located 2.6 km (1.6 mi) north of the centre of Matale.

== History ==
The inhabitants of Agalawatta supplied iron and saltpeter to the "Aramadula" in the Dutch Ceylon and British Ceylon, according to Archibald Campbell Lawrie's 1896 gazetteer of the province.

== Demographics ==
Historical population
Year	Pop.	±%
1881	383	—
1891	428	+11.7%

== See also ==
- List of towns in Central Province, Sri Lanka
