= Aluvihare =

Aluvihare අලුවිහාරය அலுவிஹாரை
- suburb
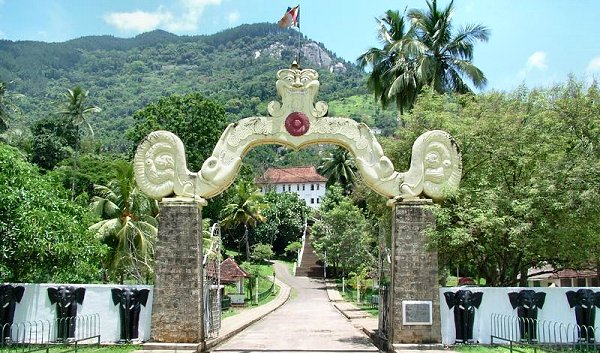
- Entrance to Aluvihare rock temple

- Location within Sri Lanka
- Coordinates: 7°30′N 80°37′E
- Country: Sri Lanka
- Province: Central Province
- District: Matale
- Division: Matale Division

Government
  - Type: Matale Municipal Council
- Time zone: UTC+5:30 (Sri Lanka Standard Time)
- Postal Code: 21054
- Area code: 066

Aluvihare (Sinhala: අලුවිහාරය Tamil: அலுவிஹாரை) is a suburb of Matale, in Central Province of Sri Lanka. It lies 3.5 km (2.2 mi) north of Matale and 150 km (93 mi) north-east of the capital Colombo.

The suburb is situated on the Kandy-Jaffna highway (A9).

It was founded by Valagamba of Anuradhapura, around 300 B.C. but did not receive the name Aluvihare until a later date. The Aluvihare family originated from the area, an important family responsible for looking after the Aluvihare Rock Temple, and thus serving the Buddhist community in Sri Lanka.

Today, Aluvihare is a popular attraction for both tourists and Buddhists wishing to visit the Aluvihare Rock Temple.

== See also ==
- Aluvihare Rock Temple
- Nalanda Gedige
- List of settlements in Central Province, Sri Lanka
