= Veera Puran Appu (film) =

1978 film directed by Lester James Peries

Veera Puran Appu වීර පුරන් අප්පු
- Directed by: Lester James Peries
- Written by: Tissa Abeysekara
- Based on: Life of Veera Puran Appu
- Produced by: Shalanka Films
- Starring: Ravindra Randeniya; Joe Abeywickrama; Malani Fonseka
- Cinematography: Donald Karunaratne
- Edited by: Gladwin Fernando
- Music by: Premasiri Khemadasa
- Release date: 8 August 1978
- Country: Sri Lanka
- Language: Sinhala

Veera Puran Appu (Sinhala: වීර පුරන් අප්පු) is a 1978 Sri Lankan Sinhala epic biographical film directed by Lester James Peries and produced by former cabinet minister Tyronne Fernando for Shalanka Films. It stars Ravindra Randeniya and Joe Abeywickrama in lead roles along with Malani Fonseka and Tissa Abeysekara. Music composed by Premasiri Khemadasa. It is the 399th Sri Lankan film in the Sinhala cinema.

The film screened in 17 cinemas in the fifth board. The film completed box office 100 days at the Webley Cinema Hall, Kandy. In the film, it is noted that more than 1,500 actors contributed to the success of the film. In 1979 SIGNIS Awards ceremony, Tissa Abeysekara was awarded the memorial award for his role as Kudapola Thero.

== Plot ==
The film centered around the story behind national patriot Veera Puran Appu and his Matale rebellion in 1848 for the freedom from British. Though he was executed by the British by firing squad, his influence to the country's independence has been highly praised and thus Puran Appu is highlighted as a national hero of the Sri Lankan history.

== Cast ==
- Ravindra Randeniya as Puran Appu 'Francisco Fernando'
- Malini Fonseka as Bandara Menike
- Tissa Abeysekera as Ven. Kudapola Sri Rahula Thero
- Joe Abeywickrama as Gongalegoda Banda 'King David'
- Sriyani Amarasena as Kuda Manike 'Kumarihamy'
- Dharmasiri Bandaranayake as Punchi Rala
- Robin Fernando as Hanguranketha Dingirala
- David Dharmakeerthi as Gunnepana Arachchi
- Somasiri Dehipitiya as Puran Appu's brother
- Basil de Seram as British gunman
- Jean-Pierre Hautin as Captain Neville Watson
- Alfred Berry as Government Agent Bullen
- John Burgess as Governor Torrington
- David Thackeray as Sir Emerson Tennent
- Humphrey Rodrigo as Nilame
- Elson Divithurugama as Village crier
- Vincent Vaas as Cruel Master
- Cletus Mendis as one of Puran Appu's soldiers
- Buddhadasa Vithanarachchi as Rebel
- Wilson Karunaratne as Rebel
- Granville Rodrigo as Rebel
- B. S. Perera

== Songs ==
No.	Title	Lyrics	Singer(s)	Length
1.	"Sakala Sarin Piri Siri Lankawe"	Parakrama Kodithuwakku	Sunil Edirisinghe
2.	"Gambhira Thedati Constantinu"		Sunil Edirisinghe
3.	"Jaya Apatai Lankawe"	Arisen Ahubudu	Abeywardena Balasuriya, Sunil Edirisinghe, Ivor Dennis, Dharmasiri
4.	"Sinhalayo Api Sinhalayo"	Arisen Ahubudu	Abeywardena Balasuriya, Sunil Edirisinghe, Ivor Dennis, Dharmasiri
5.	"Batha Ka Iwarai"	Parakrama Kodithuwakku	Sunil Edirisinghe
6.	"Jathiya Wenuwen (poem)"		W. D. Amaradeva
