= Keppetipola Disawe =

19th century Sri Lankan military leader

Rajapaksa Wickramasekera Mudiyanselage Bandaranayake Monaravila Keppetipola
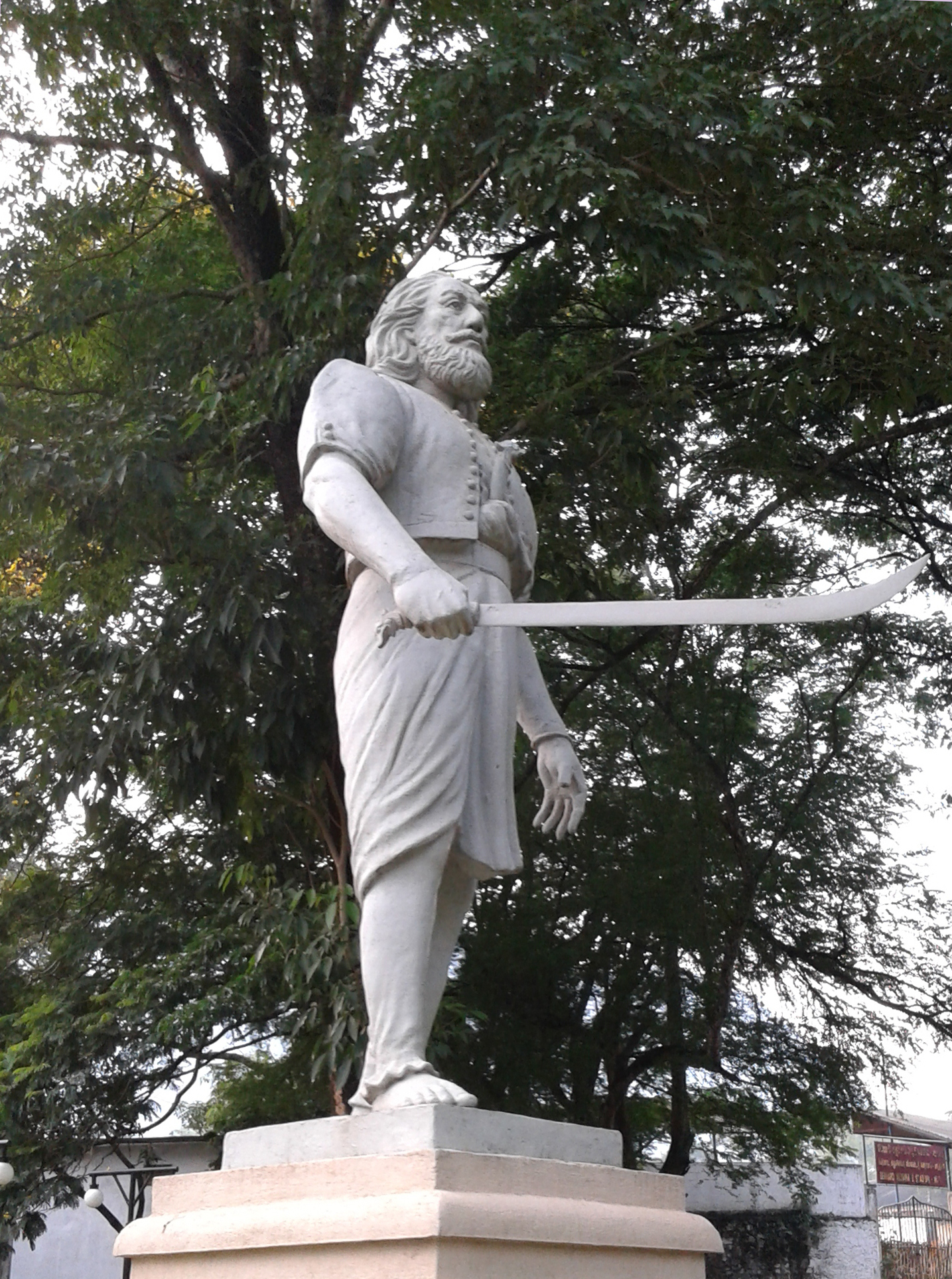
- Born: Udugoda, Udasiya Pattuwa, Matale, Kingdom of Kandy
- Died: 25 November 1818; Kandy, Kingdom of Kandy
- Cause of death: Executed by beheading
- Resting place: Sri Lanka
- Occupations: Disawe of Matale & Disawe of Uva
- Known for: Leading the Uva Rebellion of 1818
- Spouse: Delwala Ethanahamy (Rathnapura)
- Children: 2 sons
- Parent(s): Golahela Disawe (Father), Monaravila Kumarihamy (Mother)
- Relatives: Ehelepola Kumarihamy (Younger sister), Madduma Bandara Ehelapola(nephew)

Rajapaksa Wickramasekera Mudiyanselage Bandaranayake Monarawila Keppetipola (Sinhala:රාජපක්ෂ වික්‍රමසේකර මුදියන්සේලාගේ බණ්ඩාරනායක මොනරවිල කැප්පැටිපොල), more widely known as Keppetipola Disawe was a Disawe, a high-ranking official under the rule of King Sri Wikrama Rajasinghe and later under the British Administration in Sri Lanka (then known as Ceylon). He was a prominent leader of the Uva rebellion of 1818 after he joined the rebels whom he was sent to suppress by the British. The rebellion was defeated by the British, and Keppetipola Disawe along with several other leaders of the rebellion were found guilty of high treason and sentenced to death. He is well known for the exceptional courage that he showed at the moment of his execution and is now a national hero of Sri Lanka.

== Early life and family ==
Keppetipola was born in Udugoda, Udasiya Pattuwa, Matale, Kingdom of Kandy to Golahala Nilame a courtier in the court of King Rajadi Rajasinghe and King Sri Wikrama Rajasinghe, who served as the Diyawadana Nilame to the king and Disawe Of Tamankaduwa. Ehelepola Kumarihamy, the wife of Ehelepola Nilame was his younger sister who was put to death along with her children by King Sri Wikrama Rajasinghe.

== The beginning of the British rule and joining the rebellion ==
Keppetipola Disawe was one of the Sinhalese leaders who signed the ‘’Udarata Treaty’’ at Kandy on 2 March 1815, bringing the whole island under the British rule. Keppetipola was one of the three leaders who signed the treaty in Sinhala. This is noted by some as a sign that even though Keppetipola signed this treaty, he was not willing to bring his country under the British rule.

Keppetipola served under the British rule as a Disawe, in charge of the Uva Province. By 1817 the rebellions were getting uncontrollable and attempts at negotiations also failed. As advised by the British Resident in Kandy John D’Oyly, Governor Robert Brownrigg sent Keppetipola with 500 men to suppress the rebellion. However, upon meeting the rebels Keppetipola joined them as their leader at their request. His men are also said to have joined with him, but Keppetipola returned his arms and ammunition to the British governor saying that he did not wish to destroy them with their own weapons. Keppetipola continued to lead the rebellion with great success until it was ended with the disbanding of the rebels.

== The Rebellion of 1818 under the leadership of Keppetipola ==
Martial Law was declared in Kandy and the surrounding provinces and two army divisions were sent to Uva immediately after the news reached the Governor that Keppetipola has joined the rebels. Soon after this, Wilbawe who had claimed to be the heir to the throne, was formally crowned. Under this new king, Keppetipola was appointed as the Maha Adhikaram (Chief Minister) and the rebels were urged to fight against British colonial rule in Ceylon.

Keppetipola led a guerrilla war against the British colonial forces, knowing that the rebels were outnumbered and lesser in firepower. There were only a few large face-to-face battles done against the British army during the entire rebellion, and most of the attacks were carried out in the form of ambushes. Under the leadership of Keppetipola, the rebellion gained new strength and grew rapidly, spreading to a large part of the country. On 1 January 1818, governor Brownrigg declared Keppetipola and sixteen others as rebels, outlaws and enemies to the crown and their lands and property were confiscated.

As it became clear that the rebels were gaining the upper hand and the British forces stationed in the country cannot do enough against them, reinforcements were brought in from India. The rebels were unable to face the strengthened British forces, and were facing difficulties with supplies as most of the cultivations and livestock in the areas where the rebellion took place had been destroyed. As a result of this and because of the hardships the civilian population of Uva had to face, the rebels were disbanded and Keppetipola fled to the Nuwara Kalawiya area in Anuradhapura.

== Capture and execution of Keppetipola ==
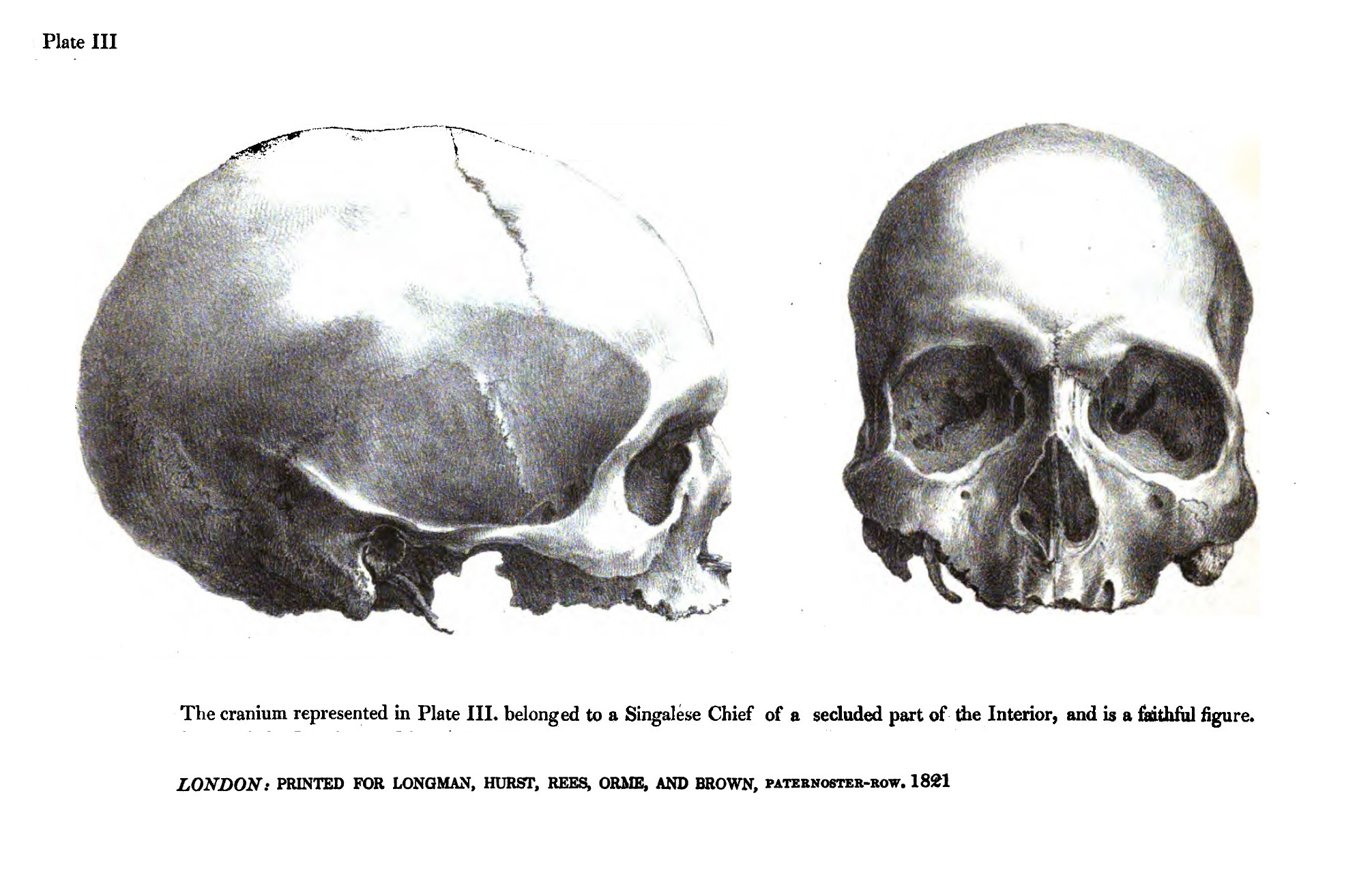
Cranium of Keppetipola Disawe.

On 28 October 1818, Keppetipola along with Pilimathalawe, another rebel leader were captured by Captain O’Neil of the British army, with the assistance of Native Lieutenant Cader-Boyet of the Ceylon Rifle Regiment. As the troops surrounded the house he was in, Keppitipola Disawe boldly came out and greeted Capt. O’Neil identified himself to them and gave himself in. After his capture, Keppetipola was taken to Kandy where he was tried for high treason and sentenced to death by beheading.

On 25 November 1818, Keppetipola and Madugalle, another rebel leader, were taken to the Temple of the Tooth, where they performed their religious rituals. Here Keppetipola made his final wish as to be born in the Himalayas on his next birth and attain Nirvana. He offered a cloth he wore to the temple, and presented his Dhammapada to his friend Simon Sawers. He requested Sawers to come to the execution grounds with him and witness his death but was refused as Sawers did not wish to see his friend's death.

Keppetipola and Madugalle were taken to the execution grounds at Bogambara, where Keppetipola requested the executioner to behead him with a single stroke of the sword. Keppetipola tied up his hair over his head to avoid it falling onto his neck and bent to receive the sword stroke, uttering the supreme and great qualities of the Buddha. However, the executioner failed to behead him with one stroke as requested and Keppetipola was killed on the second stroke.

After his death, his skull was taken to Britain and placed in the Phrenological Society of Edinburgh. When Ceylon gained independence from the British in 1948, Keppetipola was declared a national hero, because he'd fought against foreign rule. In 1954 at the request of the Government of Ceylon his skull was returned home, and entombed in the Keppetipola Memorial in Kandy.
