= Fort MacDowall =

Fort in Matale, Sri Lanka

- Part of Matale District
- Matale, Sri Lanka

Site information
- Type: Defence fort
- Condition: Remnant

Location
- Sri Lanka
- Coordinates: 7.465225°N 80.622195°E

Site history
- Built: 1803
- Built by: British
- Battles/wars: Matale rebellion

Fort MacDowall was located in Matale. It was a fortified outpost during the Kandyan Wars, named after Major General Hay MacDowall, the 6th Commander of British Troops in Ceylon. The fort was one of the few inland forts constructed by the British and was completed in 1803.

It was garrisoned on 25 April 1803 by 55 men of the 19th Regiment under the command of Captains Madge and Pearce. On 24 June the fort was surrounded and besieged by troops of the Kandyan army. For three days Captain Madge refused offers to surrender the fort however during the night on 27 June he managed to withdraw without detection, together with two officers, thirteen men of the 19th and 22 men of the Malay Regiment. They left behind 19 Europeans who were to sick to travel. Captain Madge and his men succeeded in reaching Trincomalee, approximately 201 km (125 mi) through jungle and enemy held territory, on 3 July. The individuals who remained at the fort were massacred by the Kandyan army when they found the fort undefended.

During the Matale rebellion, on 28 July 1848, the fort came under siege by approximately 400 rebels led by Puran Appu and Gongalegoda Banda, but the British garrison repulsed the attack. The rebels also burnt down a coffee storehouse and ransacked the Matale Kachcheri, destroying the tax records contained inside. On 29 July, the governor of Ceylon, Lord Torrington, declared martial law in the colony. A detachment of the Ceylon Rifle Regiment, under the command of Captain Albert Watson, was dispatched from Kandy on 28 July, together with 220 men from the 19th Regiment of Foot, commanded by Captain Lillie C.R.R. On 29 July 1848, the 19th Regiment of Foot attacked a rebel force consisting of roughly 4,000 rebels at Wariyapola Estate who were heading towards Kandy; the rebels suffered casualties amounting to over 100 men killed and captured and hundreds wounded, while the lone British casualty was an injured soldier. After the battle, roughly 250 captured rebels were court-martialled and subsequently executed (either by firing squad or hanging) in Fort MacDowall. Watson and Lillie then led their troops in occupying Matale, arresting a number of rebel leaders, including Appu and Banda. Initial reports indicated that only thirteen rebels were killed and nine executed in Fort MacDowall. After the suppression of the rebellion, Torrington admitted "that the total number killed and wounded amounted to little less than two hundred", although unofficially the numbers are purportedly higher.

The only physical remnants of the fort that exist today are the gateway and portion of the ramparts. The interior of the fort is currently used as the Matale cemetery, which includes a monument to the rebellion.
