= Ceylon Medal =

Award for gallantry during Kandyan War of 1818

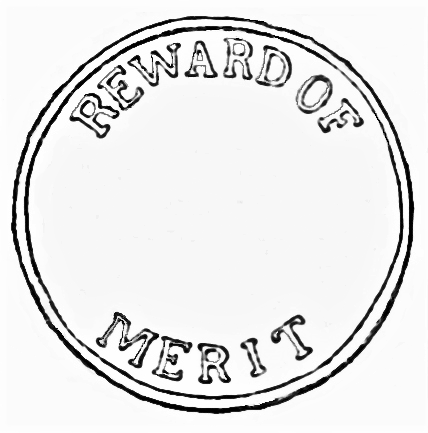
- Illustration of medal, obverse and reverse
- Type: Gallantry medal
- Country: British Ceylon
- Presented by: Ceylon
- Campaigns: Uva rebellion during 3rd Kandyan War, 1818
- Established: 1819
- First award: 1819

Highlights
- Total: 45 or 47 (2 gold, 45 silver)
- Worn round the neck on a blue ribbon

The Ceylon Medal was a campaign medal awarded by the Government of Ceylon from 1819 for a military action along the Badulla-Passara route on 16 June 1818, during the closing stages of the Uva rebellion, part of the third Kandyan War. The medal was the only one struck for the Kandyan Wars.

== Background ==
On 16 June 1818, several regiments of British colonial forces were on the road to Badulla: the 19th, 73rd, the 1st and 2nd Ceylon Regiments, and the 7th, 15th and 18th Madras Native Infantry. The column took rest at Passara, and a Lieutenant Wilkinson directed a party of troops to go on ahead to Badulla and rendezvous with an escort party; this scouting party consisted of "6 Europeans, 6 Malays and 6 Caffres". The party, being unfamiliar with the area, were caught in a Kandyan ambush at a point about 2 miles (3.2 km) from Badulla; the Ceylon Government Gazette of 4 July 1818 describes the events that then unfolded:

...two fine soldiers of the 73rd Regiment, James Sutherland and William Chandler, were unfortunately killed upon the spot. The gallant conduct of the rest of the party well deserves public notice & approbation. They were resolved not to abandon their Comrades even in death, nor to suffer their bodies to be insulted by a barbarous enemy; Lance Corporal McLaughlan with another European & 4 Native Soldiers volunteered to fight their way to Badulla where they might procure assistance. The remaining 2 Europeans & 8 Natives formed themselves into a circle round the dead bodies which they had previously removed to a spot of open ground while the Corporal and his companions made their way good to Badulla followed and constantly fired at by numerous Rebels; the determined band posted round the bodies was assailed for upwards of two hours by strong parties of Kandians who, urged on by their Chiefs from the Hills, for they always keep at a distance themselves, advanced within 150 or 200 yards & poured in volleys of Musketry. The cool intrepidity of the Soldiers was shewn in the judicious reserve of their fire, for they never returned more than two shots at a time, which were sufficient to keep off the dastardly enemy until Lieut. Burns with a Detachment from Badulla drove them all into the jungle & the bodies were brought off and interred in Badulla.

The General Orders of 7 July 1818 and 3 June 1819 notes the party of ten holding off the attackers for nearly two hours, until relief arrived in the form of a detachment from the 83rd regiment from Badulla. It goes on to promote McLaughlan to the rank of Sergeant, and recommend that the men involved be given some sort of formal distinction or recognition for their actions.

The Ceylonese Government struck the medal in 1819, with the total number awarded varying between sources, some stating 45 and others 47 (2 in gold, 45 in silver). By regiment, recipients included 39 men of the 1st and two of the 2nd Ceylon Regiment, together with four men of the 73rd Regiment. Four men were awarded the medals posthumously, having died of fever in the interim: Lance Corporal Richard McLaughlan, Private John Wilson, Private Christopher Sheppard and Private William Connor, all of the 73rd.

== Design ==
The medal had a diameter of 1.5 inches (38 mm), with the obverse bearing the inscription "CEYLON 1818" surrounded by a wreath of bay and oak leaves, while the reverse had "REWARD OF MERIT" around the edge, with the recipient's name engraved in the centre. The medal was intended to be worn around the neck on a 1.5 inch wide deep navy blue ribbon.

The original medals are believed not to have survived, with only a replica being on display at the Black Watch Museum in Perth, Scotland.

== See also ==
- British Army
- Capture of Ceylon Medal
- Military awards and decorations of Sri Lanka
