= Christ Church, Matale =

Anglican church in Sri Lanka

- Christ Church, Matale
- 7°27′49″N 80°37′24″E
- Location: Higgolla Mawatha, Matale, Sri Lanka
- Denomination: Anglican, Church of Ceylon

History
- Consecrated: 30 December 1860

Architecture
- Functional status: Active
- Heritage designation: Archaeological protected monument
- Architectural type: Church
- Style: Neo-Gothic

Clergy
- Vicar: Rev.

Christ Church, Matale (Sinhala: ක්‍රිස්තු දේවස්ථානය, මාතලේ) is an Anglican church and the oldest church in Matale, Sri Lanka.

The church is located on the site of the former Fort MacDowall, which was abandoned in 1836. It sits on a small hill, with views over the entrance to Matale via Trincomalee. The church was erected and furnished by Rev. William Frederick Kelly, the colonial chaplain for the area. Kelly and thirty six others sent a petition to Bishop Chapman, to dedicate and consecrate Christ Church. The church was consecrated by Bishop James Chapman on 29 December 1860. The parsonage was opened on 16 August 1862. Kelly was succeeded by Rev. S. T. Taylor in 1865, following Kelly's appointment as Colonial chaplain in Nuwara Eliya.

The church celebrated its 75th anniversary in 1935, its centenary on 29 January 1961 and its 125th anniversary on 6 September 1986. In 1985 the church was gutted by fire and subsequently completely restored, during which time services were held in the Baptist Church. A special service held in this church, in connection with the Coronation of His Majesty King George V, and Queen Mary, on 22 June 1911. The offertory on that was given to the King Edward VIII. The church celebrated its 150th anniversary on 2 October 2010.

== See also ==
- Church of Ceylon
