= Hulangamuwa =

Coordinates: 7°28′N 80°37′E

- Suburb
- Hulangamuwa
- Location within Sri Lanka
- Country: Sri Lanka
- Province: Central Province
- District: Matale District
- Divisional Secretariat: Matale Divisional Secretariat

Government
  - Municipal Council: Matale Municipal Council (MMC)
- Time zone: UTC+5:30 (Time in Sri Lanka)
  - Summer (DST): UTC+5:30 (not observed)

Hulangamuwa is a suburb of Matale, Sri Lanka. It is located 2.0 km (1.2 mi) south of the city centre in Matale District, Central Province. The Abilla Raja Maha Viharaya and Petmalumaga temple are located in Hulangamuwa.

== See also ==
- List of towns in Central Province, Sri Lanka
