= Gallella =

- Village
- Interactive map of Gallella
- Country: Sri Lanka
- Province: Central Province
- Time zone: UTC+5:30 (Sri Lanka Standard Time)

Gallella gama is a village in Sri Lanka. It is located within Kandy, Central Province.

== See also ==
- List of towns in Central Province, Sri Lanka
- Kandy
- Matale
- Nuwara Eliya
