= Madduma =

Madduma is a given name. Notable people with the name include:

- Madduma Bandara Ehelapola (born 1806), one of the national heroes of Sri Lanka
- Ranjith Madduma Bandara (born 1954), Sri Lankan politician
