= Hay MacDowall =

British Army general (c.1752–c.1809)

Lieutenant-General Hay MacDowall
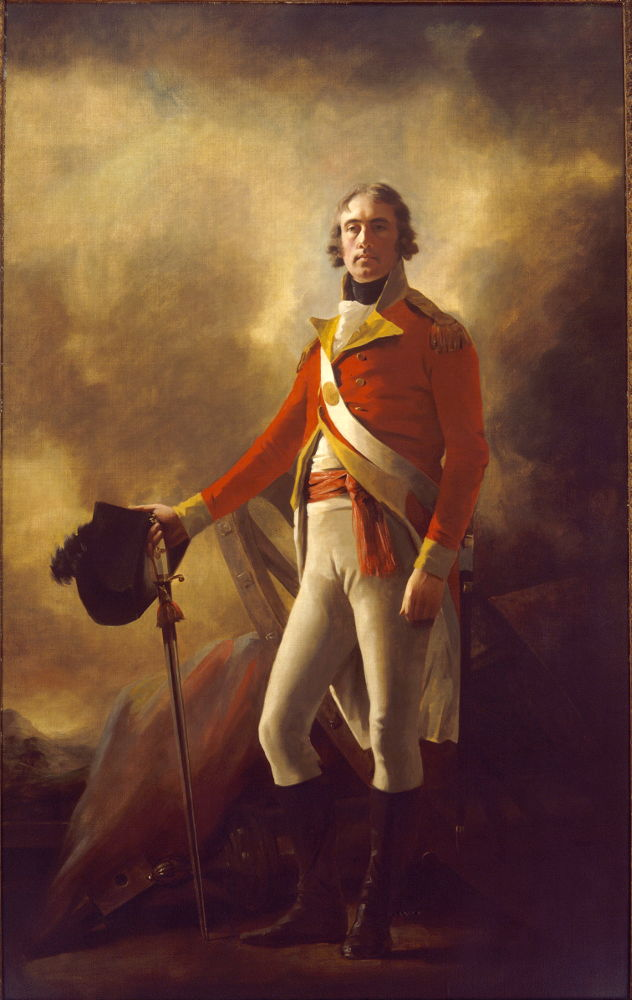
- Portrait of MacDowall by Sir Henry Raeburn, c. 1791–1793

6th General Officer Commanding, Ceylon
- In office 19 July 1799 – 1804
- Preceded by: Josiah Champagne
- Succeeded by: David Douglas Wemyss

Personal details
- Born: c. 1752 Dumfries and Galloway, Scotland
- Died: c. 16 March 1809 At sea, off Cape of Good Hope

Military service
- Allegiance: United Kingdom
- Branch/service: British Army
- Rank: Lieutenant-General
- Commands: General Officer Commanding, Ceylon; Madras Army
- Battles/wars: Napoleonic Wars; Kandyan Wars

Lieutenant-General Hay MacDowall (c. 1752 – c. 16 March 1809) was a Scottish officer in the British Army who was the sixth General Officer Commanding, Ceylon. He was appointed on 19 July 1799. He was succeeded by David Douglas Wemyss. Fort MacDowall in Matale was named due to his involvement during Kandyan Wars. Only the remnants of gateway and portion of the ramparts are exist today.

== Biography ==
MacDowall hailed from Garthland Mains, Dumfries and Galloway, Scotland, where the family seat was Garthland Castle. He was the fourth son of William MacDowell (c. 1719–1784), M.P. for Renfrewshire, and Elizabeth Graham, granddaughter of Alexander Livingstone, 3rd Earl of Callendar. His brothers William MacDowall (c. 1749–1810) and Captain David McDowall-Grant (1761–1841) were Members of Parliament. His nephew was Lt. Gen. Day Hort MacDowall (1795–1870) and great-nephew was Canadian politician Day Hort MacDowall (1850–1927).

In August 1782, he was the commanding officer of the fort of Trincomalee when the French lay siege to it in the run-up to the Battle of Trincomalee. He surrendered to Suffren on 30 August in exchange for safe passage to Madras for his 1,000-man garrison.

== Later life and disappearance ==
MacDowall was appointed Lieutenant-Colonel of the 57th Regiment of Foot in 1791 and served in Flanders in 1793 and later as commander-in-chief in Ceylon from 1798 to 1804. In 1802, as a Major-General, he was appointed Colonel commandant of a Battalion of the 40th Regiment of Foot in place of Lord Hutchinson. He was appointed Commander-in-Chief of the Madras Army in 1807. He was made Colonel of the 41st Regiment of Foot in 1808. Following a period of dispute with the civil government of Madras over his exclusion from its council, and the affair of the arrest of Quartermaster-General John Munro, he resigned his commission in January 1809 and took ship for England on the East Indiaman Lady Jane Dundas. The ship was lost with all hands near the Cape of Good Hope in March 1809.

== See also ==
- List of people who disappeared mysteriously at sea

== Citations ==
Military offices
Preceded by Sir John Cradock	C-in-C, Madras Army; 1807–1810	Succeeded by Sir Samuel Auchmuty
Preceded by Sir Thomas Stirling, 5th Baronet	Colonel of the 41st Regiment of Foot; 1808–1809	Succeeded by Sir Josiah Champagné
Preceded by Josiah Champagne	General Officer Commanding, Ceylon; 1799–1804	Succeeded by David Douglas Wemyss
