= General Wemyss =

General Wemyss may refer to:

- Colville Wemyss (1891–1959), British Army general
- David Douglas Wemyss (1760–1839), British Army major general
- William Wemyss (1760–1822), British Army general
