= Gongalegoda Banda =

Leader of 1848 Matale rebellion

Gongalegoda Banda ගොංගාලේගොඩ බණ්ඩා
- Pretender
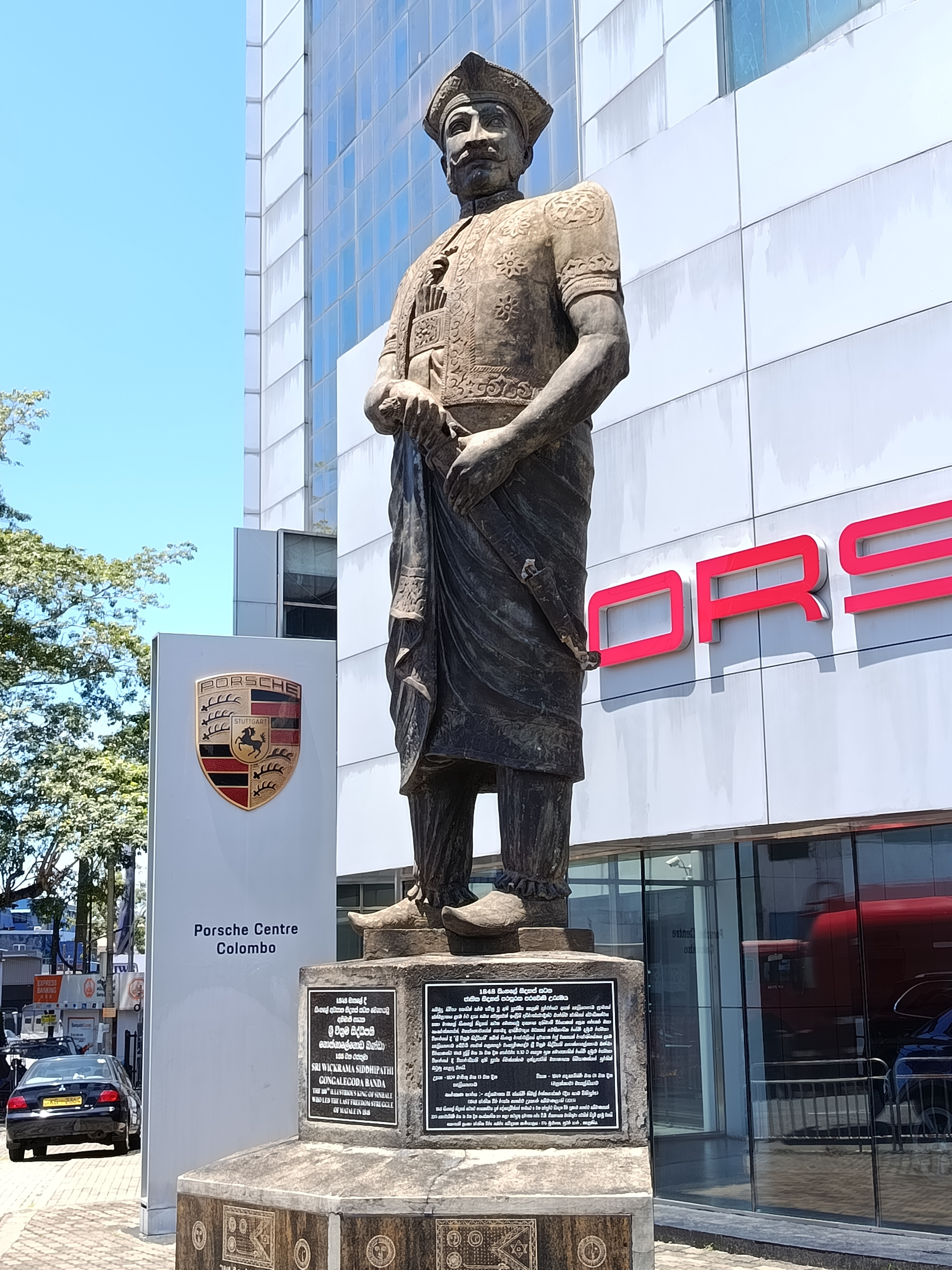
- A statue of Gongalegoda Banda
- Born: 13 March 1809; Kingdom of Kandy
- Died: 1 December 1849; Straits Settlements
- Regnal name claimed: Sri Wickrama Siddipathi
- Throne(s) claimed: King of Kandy
- Pretend from: 26 July 1848
- Monarchy abolished: 1848
- Last monarch: Sri Wickrama Rajasinghe
- Father: Wansapurna Dewage Sinchia Fernando

Wansapurna Dewage David (Sinhala: වංසපූර්ණ දේවගේ ඩේවිඩ්) alias Gongalegoda Banda (Sinhala: ගොංගාලේගොඩ බණ්ඩා), (a.k.a. Peliyagoda David; 13 March 1809 – 1 December 1849) was the leader of the Matale rebellion in 1848, pretender to the throne of Kandy and a national hero of Sri Lanka.

== Early life ==
Born on 13 March 1809 in Peliyagoda (Wanawasala), the second son of Wansapurna Dewage Sinchia Fernando, he had been employed by the police and was engaged in transport work on the Kandy road and came to reside at Gongalegoda, Udunuwara where he became a popular figure among the Kandyans. At the age of 35 he married the daughter of Gongalegoda Menik Rala.

== 1848 Rebellion ==
He was seen at the Dalada Maligawa just before the Matale rebellion broke out. Gongalegoda Banda led the protest march regarding unjustifiable taxes which was held on 6 July 1848 near the Kandy Kachchery. The rebellion was the first major uprising against the British since the Uva Rebellion in 1818. The anti-colonial movement on the island in 1848 was led by leaders such as Banda, Puran Appu, and Dingiri Rala, who were supported by many of the local people.

=== Proclamation of the king ===
Personal flag of Gongalegoda Banda

On 26 July 1848, the leaders and the supporters entered the historic Dambulla Vihara and there Banda was crowned by the head priest of Dambulla, Ven. Giranegama Thera. According to the head priest of Dambulla, Banda was given the regnal name Sri Wickrama Siddhipathi and spoke fluently in his own language, Sinhala. He asked the people, "whether you are on the side of the Buddhist? or British?" On the same day his brother, Dines, was declared the sub-king and Dingirala as the prince of Sath Korale. Puran Appu was appointed as the prime minister and the sword bearer to Banda. Puran Appu attended the consecration ceremony of Banda with 400 others.

After the proclamation of the king, he left Dambulla with his army via Matale to capture Kandy from the British. On 28 July 1848 they raided Fort MacDowall in Matale causing much loss to the British amidst well fortified resistance. They attacked government buildings specially the Matale Kachcheri and destroyed the tax records. Simultaneously, Dingiri Rala instigated attacks in Kurunegala, where eight people were killed by the British. The British Governor, Lord Torrington, declared martial law on 29 July 1848 and 31 July in Kandy and Kurunegala respectively.

=== The Rebellion fails ===
The rebellion was aborted after several Korale Mahattayas betrayed the rebels for rewards from the British, resulting in the arrest of Puran Appu on 29 July 1848 at Wariyapola. Gongalegoda Banda and his elder brother Dines escaped and went into hiding. The Governor issued a warrant on Gongalegoda Banda for his arrest and a reward of 150 pounds to be given to anyone who gave information of his whereabouts.

=== Trial and exile ===
On 21 September 1848, Gongalegoda Banda was arrested by the Malay soldiers at Elkaduwa and was brought to Kandy. The trial of Gongalegoda Banda commenced on 27 November at the Supreme Court sessions in Kandy. He was charged of high treason for claiming he himself as the King of Kandy, declaring as a descendant of the Kandy Kings, ongoing and waging war against the British. Banda declared that he was guilty of all the above charges. The judgement of the Supreme Court was that he would be hanged on 1 January 1849. However, on an appeal made by Gongalegoda Banda to the Governor, a proclamation was issued on 29 December 1848 to commute the death sentence to one hundred flogs and being sent into exile.

On 1 January 1849, Gongalegoda Banda was flogged one hundred times in Kandy before a large gathering of people and sent into exile in Malacca (now Malaysia). Governor Lord Torrington writing a dispatch to the Secretary of State informed that deportation for life was more effective than death penalty. By deporting Gongalegoda Banda, the Governor had (according to him) instilled a permanent fear among the inhabitants for future rebellion against the British rule. Gongalegoda Banda who was exiled to Malacca arrived there on 3 May 1849. He died of a stomach ailment on 1 December 1849 in Malacca, which was reported by Tikiri Banda Dunuwila, who was also exiled there.

== See also ==
- Matale rebellion
- Puran Appu
