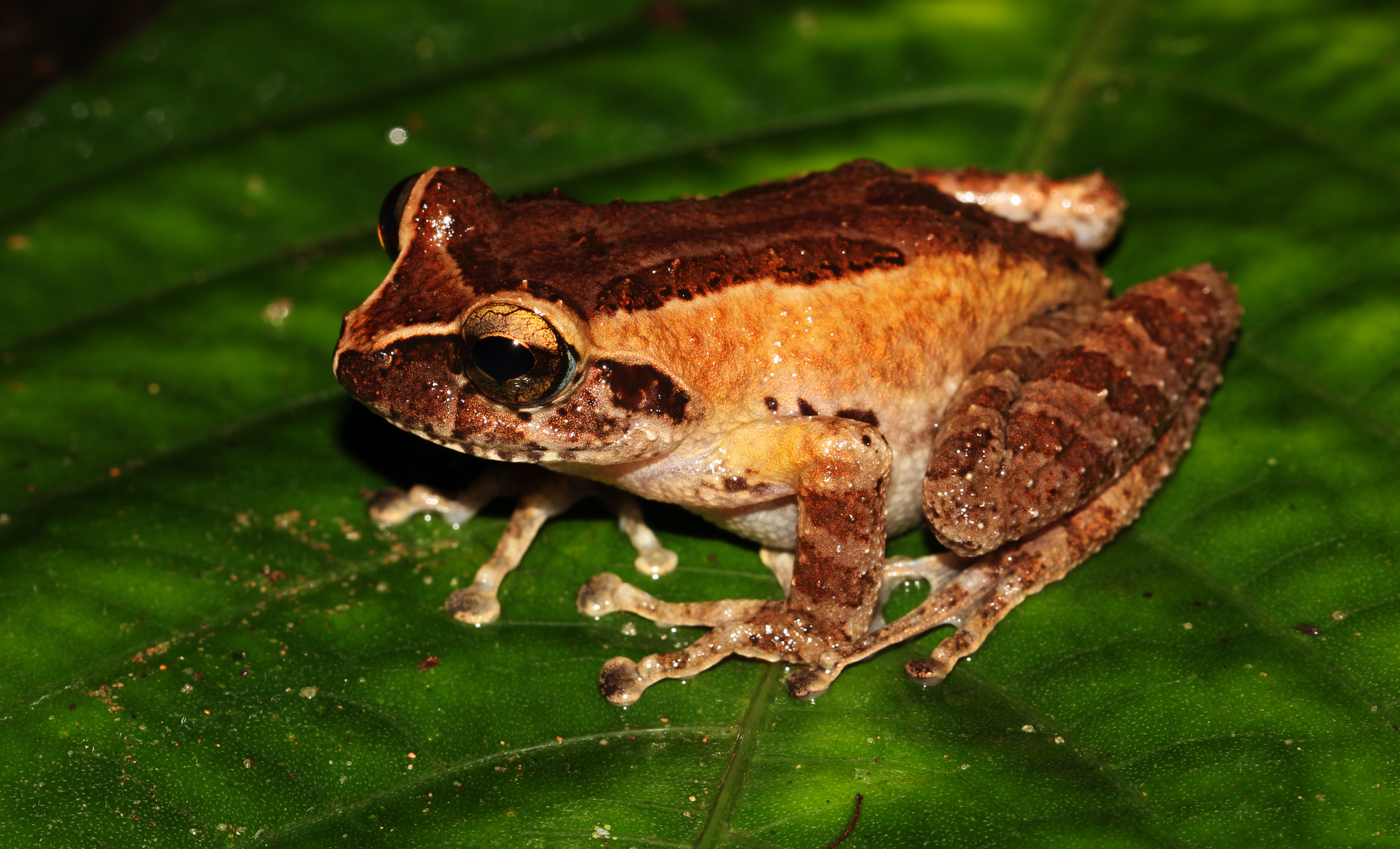

Conservation status
- Critically Endangered (IUCN 3.1)

Scientific classification
- Kingdom: Animalia
- Phylum: Chordata
- Class: Amphibia
- Order: Anura
- Family: Rhacophoridae
- Genus: Pseudophilautus
- Species: P. puranappu

Binomial name
- Pseudophilautus puranappu Wickramasinghe et al, 2013

= Pseudophilautus puranappu =

Puran Appu's shrub frog

Species of amphibian

Pseudophilautus puranappu (Puran Appu's shrub frog) is a species of frogs in the family Rhacophoridae, endemic to Sri Lanka. Scientists have know it from the type locality: Sripada Peak in the Peak Wilderness, between 1800 and 2100 meters above sea level.

== Habitat and threats ==
Its natural habitats are wet lowland forests of Sri Lanka. This frog is active at night, but people have seen it during the day in shaded perches on rocks. It is threatened by habitat loss, which scientists attribute to urbanization, increased agriculture and grazing, and logging. It is one of the 8 species of rhacophorids that was discovered from Adam's Peak in 2013.

== Etymology ==
The frog was named after legendary hero Veera Puran Appu, who was a Sri Lankan leader led to fights against British troops in Sri Lanka.

== Description ==
The adult male frog measures 33.6 – 34.2 mm in snout-vent length and the adult female frog 51.5 mm. The skin of the dorsum is light brown in color with a dark red stripe from the snout to the vent that can take the shape of an hourglass. The flanks can be pink or yellow in color. The legs are dark brown-green in color. The dorsal color is well distinctive where the middle parts of the body with dark brown same as limbs, but other parts of the dorsum is light creamy brown.
