= Aluvihare Rock Temple =

Buddhist temple in Sri Lanka

- මාතලේ අලුවිහාරය
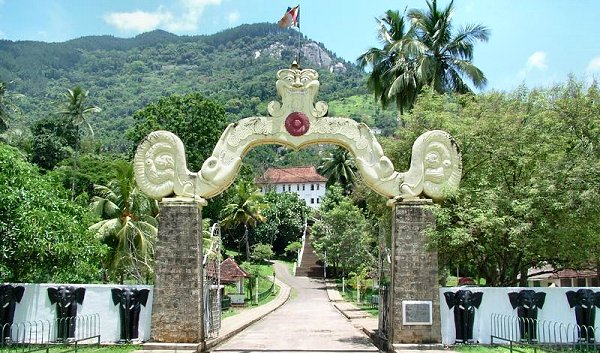
- The main entrance of the Aluvihare Rock Temple

Religion
- Affiliation: Buddhism
- District: Matale
- Province: Central Province

Location
- Location: Aluvihare, Sri Lanka
- Interactive map of Aluvihare Rock Temple
- Coordinates: 07°29′49.9″N 80°37′18.7″E

Architecture
- Type: Buddhist Temple
- Archaeological Protected Monument of Sri Lanka
- Designated: 11 October 1974

The Aluvihare Rock Temple (also called Matale Alu Viharaya) is a sacred Buddhist temple located in Aluvihare, Matale District of Sri Lanka. Surrounded by hills, the Aluvihara cave temple is situated 30 km north of Kandy on the Matale-Dambulla road. The history of Aluvihare Rock Temple is traced back to the 3rd Century B.C to the reign of King Devanampiyatissa. It is believed that the king built the dagoba, planted the Bo sapling and founded the temple after the introduction of Buddhism to the country during his reign.

Aluvihare Rock Temple was the historic location where the Pāli Canon was first written down completely in text on ola (palm) leaves. Many monastery caves, some of which exhibit frescoes are situated near this temple.

== History and significance ==
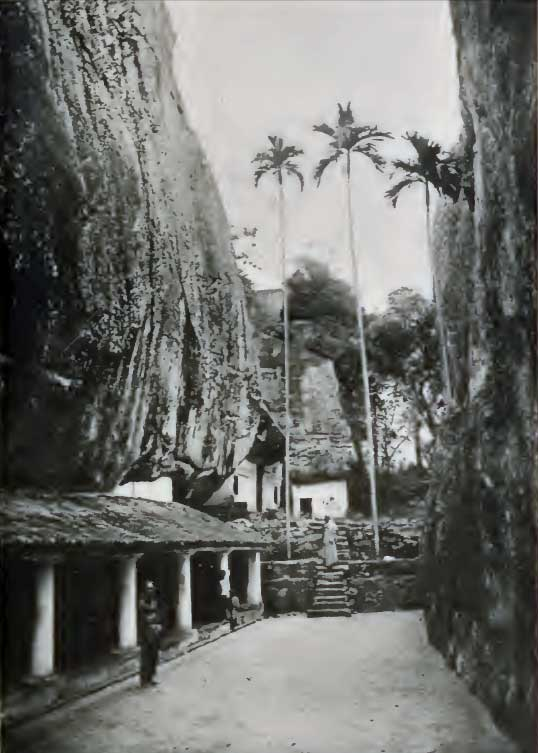
Alu Vihare temple in 1896

In the 1st Century BC, during the reign of King Walagamba, Sri Lanka underwent a famine known as 'Baminithiyasaya' for 12 years. There was also a South Indian invasion at the same time and the Buddhist monks of that era realized that these problems would be a danger to the existence of Buddha Sasana in the country. Under these conditions, memorizing and repeating the Dhamma (doctrine) was difficult. Due to the famine Buddhist monks did not receive sufficient alms and faced many difficulties, and they had to eat yams, roots and leaves of trees for their survival. A group of about 60 of them went to Malaya Rata, which is said to be the hilly area of the country. They managed to live on the banks of Mahaweli river under harsh conditions and survived for 12 years till the famine came to an end. King Walagamba who was overthrown by a rebellion during the invasion from South India, regained the throne by defeating the invaders after fourteen years.

The monks who left to India and to the hilly areas of Sri Lanka, during the difficult period, returned to Anuradhapura, and decided to transcribe the Tripiṭaka (philosophical doctrines of Buddhism) for the preservation and for the use of future generations. The monks selected Aluvihare Rock temple in Matale as the most suitable and secured place to carry out this important event. This transcription was carried out due to the fear that the doctrine would be lost during the upheaval caused by repeated South Indian invasions. It is said that 500 scholarly monks congregated at Aluvihare Rock temple to perform the difficult task of first reciting the doctrines and agreeing on an acceptable version before transcription. The entire transcription was done in books made of ola leaves, locally known as puskola poth. These books were made up from thick strips created from the leaves of either the palmyra or talipot palm and the doctrines were written down in Pali language. A metal stylus was used to inscribe the characters on the ola leaves.

The old library at Aluvihare Rock Temple, which had safely housed the volumes of this transcribed manuscripts for so many centuries, was totally destroyed during the Matale Rebellion in 1848. Many parts of the temple complex was destroyed too by this incident. The consequences of this disaster are still evident today at the temple premises. It took a long a time for the recompilation, as few generations of monks had to transcribe the Tripiṭaka again. The recompilation and transcription took a long time as only few monks were engaged in this painstaking task, and the first of the three “baskets of the law” was only completed in 1982.

Aluvihare Rock temple has many caves with ancient inscriptions. These caves enclose comparatively modern wall and ceiling paintings of interest, and impressive statues and images of Buddha. The main cave of these, has a large reclining statue of the Buddha, together with standing and seated images. In the entrance-way of another cave with a reclining statue of the Buddha there are terrifying depictions of the hellish afterlife that awaits people who commits sins. One cave is dedicated to the revered Indian monk-scholar Buddhagosa, who is regarded as the greatest exponent and interpreter of the Pali canonical scriptures. He resided at Anuradhapura during the 4th and 5th centuries and is supposed to have spent several years at the Matale Alu Viharaya to engage in his scholarly work.

== Etymology ==
There are many folklore and beliefs that are related to the name Alu Vihara. According to some, the term Aloka Vihara (temple of light) later became Aluvihara as the pali word Aloka was referred to as Alu (light) in ancient Sinhalese language. Since the place was the abode of Buddhist monks, it was called a Viharaya. Hence the two words have been combined to make the term 'Aluvihara'. Another view is that, though the temple is situated in a rock cave with a huge rock in east, sunlight is not covered and disturbed by the rock. Therefore, it was known as the Aloka Lena (cave with light). However all these views and beliefs gives the conclusion, that the name of this temple is related with light.

== See also ==
- History of Sri Lanka
- Buddhism in Sri Lanka
