= Matale =

Matale මාතලේ மாத்தளை
- Administrative Capital
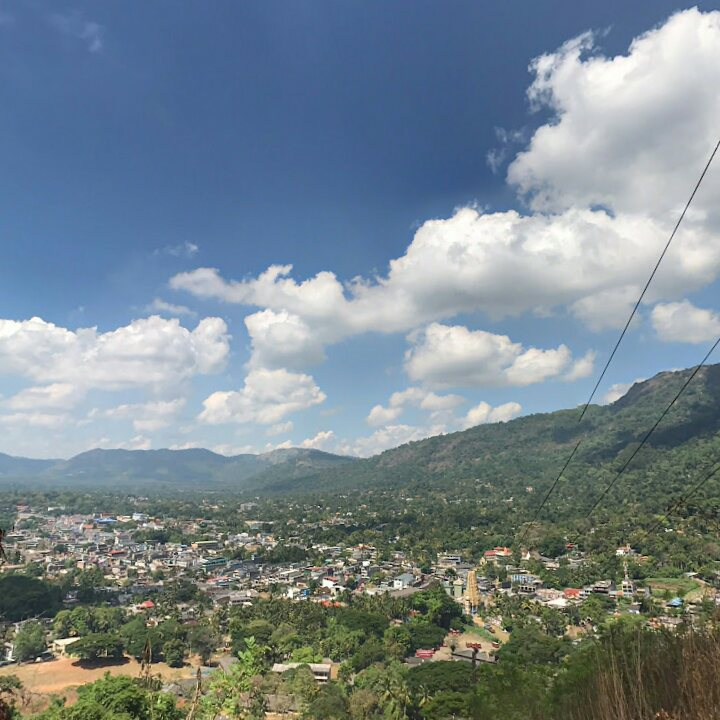
- Matale Skyline

- Location within Sri Lanka
- Coordinates: 7°28′7″N 80°37′22″E
- Country: Sri Lanka
- Province: Central Province
- District: Matale District
- Division: Matale Division
- Kingdom of Anuradhapura: Mathula Colony in 4th century BC
- Municipal Council from 1963: Matale Municipal Council
- Founder: King Pandukabhaya

Government
  - Type: Municipal Council
  - Body: Matale Municipal Council
  - Mayor: Ashoka Kottahachchi (NPP)
  - Municipal Commissioner: E. L. R. B. Atampawala
  - Matale Secretariat: Prasanna Madanayake
  - Matale Police Deputy Inspector General: D. R. L. Ranaweera

Area
  - Administrative Capital: 70.0 km^{2} (27.0 sq mi)
  - Urban: 25.65 km^{2} (9.90 sq mi)
  - Metro: 71 km^{2} (27 sq mi)
- Elevation: 364 m (1,194 ft)

Population (2016)
  - Urban: 38,229
  - Urban density: 4,051/km^{2} (10,490/sq mi)
  - Metro: 78,864
  - Metro density: 1,069/km^{2} (2,770/sq mi)
- Demonym: Mathalites

Language
  - Official: Sinhala and Tamil
  - Additional: English
- Time zone: UTC+5:30 (Time in Sri Lanka)
  - Summer (DST): UTC+5:30 (not observed)
- Postal code: 21xxx
- Area code: 066

Matale (Sinhala: මාතලේ, IPA: [maːt̪əleː], Tamil: மாத்தளை, romanized: Māttaḷai, IPA: [maːt̪ɐɭɛi̯]) is a major city in Central Province, Sri Lanka. It is the administrative capital and largest urbanised city of Matale District. Matale is also the second largest urbanised and populated city in Central Province. It is located at the heart of the Central Highlands of the island and lies in a broad, green fertile valley at an elevation of 364 m (1,194 ft) above sea level. Surrounding the city are the Knuckles Mountain Range, the foothills were called Wiltshire by the British. They have also called this place as Matelle.

== History ==
Matale is the only district of Sri Lanka where an ancient book of written history is found. It is known as Pannagamam – பன்னாகமம் ("Five Headed Serpent" in English) of Goddess Muthumari in Sri Muthumariamman Temple.

The most important historical incident in Matale is the writing of the Thripitaka during the reign of King Walagamba in 89–77 BC in Aluvihare. It is mentioned that "Mahatala" become the modern word Matale because it is placed in a valley and also the King Gajaba invaded "Soli Rata" and brought and settled 12,000 people here.

The Aluvihare Rock Temple that is situated on north side of the city's suburb, Aluvihare. The historic location where the Pali Canon was written down completely in text on ola (palm) leaves in 29 BCE.

Matale was the site of a major battle in 1848 when the Matale Rebellion started and the British garrison in the Fort MacDowall in Matale was placed under siege by the rebels led by Weera Puran Appu and Gongalegoda Banda.

The city is also the birthplace of Monarawila Keppetipola, a rebel who led the Wellasa rebellion against the British troops. His ancestral home, Kappetipola walawuwa, still exists at Hulangamuwa, Matale.

== Attractions ==
- Aluvihare Rock Temple
- Anagarika Dharmapala monument
- Christ Church, Matale
- Fort MacDowall
- Matale clock tower
- Matale railway station, the former terminus of the Colombo railway (completed in 1880)
- Sri Muthumariyamman Temple
- Nandamithra Ekanayake International Hockey Ground
- Weera Monarawila Keppetipola Monument
- Weera Puranappu Monument

== Economy ==
The city is surrounded by large plantations and is famous for its spice gardens. In addition to agriculture, the main economic activities include tourism, business and trade. Population growth, urban expansion and economic development in Matale have created regulatory and management challenges.

== Education ==
Matale is home to some of the island's oldest and leading colleges and schools.

- Government Science College
- Amina Girl's National School, Matale
- Christ Church College, Matale
- Greenwood College International, Matale
- Matale Hindu College, Matale
- Matale International School
- Pakkiyam National School, Matale
- Royal English School Matale
- St. Thomas' College, Matale
- St. Thomas' Girls' School, Matale
- Sinhala Buddhist College, Matale
- Sri Sangamitta Balika National School, Matale
- Sujatha Balika School, Matale
- Technical College, Matale
- Vijaya College, Matale
- Vijayapala Collage, Matale
- Zahira College, Matale

== Demographics ==
According by the statistics of 2019, 8.2% of the population of Matale District live in the Matale city limits and 15% of the population of the district live in Matale metropolis. Matale is a multi-ethnic and multi-cultural city, city's urban and metro area's residents are mix of numerous ethnic groups. The Sinhalese make the majority of the city. Muslims are the second largest ethnic group in the city. Others include Sri Lankan Tamils, small numbers of Indian Tamils, Burghers and Malays.

=== Ethnicity in Urban Area ===
Urban
Population	Percent
Sinhalese	46.1%
Muslims	33.0%
Sri Lankan Tamils	14.1%
Indian Tamils	7.0%
Others	0.9%

Source:statistics.gov.lk

=== Ethnicity in Metropolis Area ===
Metropolis
Population	Percent
Sinhalese	62.3%
Muslims	18.6%
Sri Lankan Tamils	16.0%
Indian Tamils	2.4%
Others	0.6%

Source:statistics.gov.lk

== Suburbs ==
- Agalawatta (MC)
- Aluvihare (MC)
- Hulangamuwa (MC)
- Kaludewala (MC)
- Mandandawela (MC)
- Palapathwela (PS)
- Ukuwela (PS)
- Yatawatta (PS)

== Notable personalities ==
- Alick Aluwihare, politician
- A. S. Jayawardena, Governor Central Bank of Sri Lanka
- Chanaka Welegedara, International cricketer
- Damith Wijayathunga, model and actor
- Dayan Witharana, singer and photographer
- Ehelepola Nilame, a minister in King Sri Vikrama Rajasinha's royal court
- Hemal Ranasinghe, model and actor
- Keppetipola Disawe, leader of the Great Rebellion of Uva in 1818
- Kingsley Jayasekera, actor and singer
- Kumar Sangakkara, International cricketer
- Lahiru Madushanka, International cricketer
- Prabath Jayasuriya, International cricketer
- Ven. Premananda, Hindu guru
- Richard Aluwihare, first Ceylonese Inspector General of Police
- Richard Udugama, first Sinhalese Buddhist Army Commander
- Sanath Wimalasiri, dramatist and dancer
- Gen. Shavendra Silva, Commander of the 58 Division during the Sri Lankan Civil War, current Commander of the Sri Lanka Army
- William Gopallawa, last Governor-General of Ceylon and first president of Republic of Sri Lanka
