= Madugalle Nilame =

Madugalle Udagabada Nilame
- Born: Madugalle Udagabada Nilame
- Cause of death: Executed by beheading
- Resting place: Sri Lanka
- Known for: Leading the Uva Rebellion of 1818
- Spouse: Madugalle Kumarihamy
- Children: 4 sons
- Website: https://keppetipola.org/

Madugalle Udagabada Nilame (Sinhala:මඩුගල්ලේ උඩගබඩා නිලමෙ), more widely known as Madugalle Nilame was a Nilame, an official under the rule of King Sri Wikrama Rajasinghe and later under the British Administration in Sri Lanka (then Ceylon). He was a leader of the Uva rebellion of 1818. He joined the rebels whom the British sent him to suppress. The rebellion was defeated by the British, and Madugalle along with several other leaders of the rebellion were convicted of insurrection.

== Background ==
In the middle of 1816, Madugalle Nilame and others conspired to oust the British and enthrone a Sinhala king. But a pro-British Nilame provided information on the conspiracy to the British.

He was imprisoned in Jaffna Prison from September 1816 to August 1817. He was the first rebel to be imprisoned.

The British removed him from the post of superintendent and from the post of Gampaha.

== Great Rebellion ==
Madugalle Nilame was one of the main leaders in the independence struggle of 1817-1818. The British stated that Madugalle Nilame was the rebellion's third main leader.

The British imposed martial law to suppress the fighting and relentlessly killed the Sinhalese. They were displaced by demolishing and torching fire. Canals and streams were destroyed and plantations and fields were destroyed to starve the rebels. The British and their helpers slaughtered and ate the villager's cattle.

The British rulers generously gave liquor to the officers, soldiers and those who helped them. Intoxicated, they raped and killed women and girls.

The Governor-General of England, Robert Brownrigg, published a proclamation on March 19, 1818, which contained the names of rebel leaders, including Nilame, and the amount of rewards to be given to their captors.

On September 22, 1818, 70 British invaded Teldeniya. At that time Nilame led Teldeniya. Following Nilame, the people of Teldeniya did not show allegiance to the British. After about five days, the rebels faltered. A Vidanevara who had served Nilame agreed to hand him to the British.

On September 27, British troops, with the help of Vidanewara, fought their way to Madugalle Madugalle village in the palace. The group entered the village on the morning of the 28th. The group entered the Vidanevara's house and hid there to trap Nilame that night.

Teldeniya Commanding Officer Captain Dobin became alarmed because he did not receive information about the troops who went to Madugalle village. Then he learned of a gunshot fired from the village. Dobin sent reinforcements. Nilame was informed of the arrival of the troops and fled.

The British troops were able to free two Lanci men captured by the Nilame's forces in March 1818. On September 29 Lieutenant Colonel Hardy and his men marched towards Dumbara.

On October 1 Colonel Hardy attempted to capture Nilame. The Nilame chased after him but instead seized a stock of military equipment.

On October 28 Lieutenant William O'Neill captured a man with a stone gun. Based on the information received, at around 3.00 pm, a group of about 30 troops deployed surrounded a palace near Paravahagama, where Nilame sheltered. When O'Neill entered the palace, Nilame again fled.

A group of villagers later learned about his whereabouts and informed the British. On the morning of November 2, with the assistance of the villagers of Nigawella, Pubbiliya, Kongahawela, Udugoda Korale, and Matale, the Seventy-third Regiment's Ensign Suitbread, with a contingent of troops, captured Nilame at the Matale Kaikawala outpost near Elahera. The villagers who captured the Nilame were rewarded with an easier tax system.

== Execution ==
Charges against him were filed in the Kandy Court. The verdict was announced on November 16. He was beheaded on November 26, 1818, at Bogambara Lake in Kandy.

His houses and estates belonging to the Nilame were confiscated. The Nilame's wife and four sons were sent to Kalutara and his mother and sister to Colombo in retaliation from relatives.
