= Puran Appu =

Sri Lankan activist and freedom fighter (1812–1848)

Veera Puran Appu
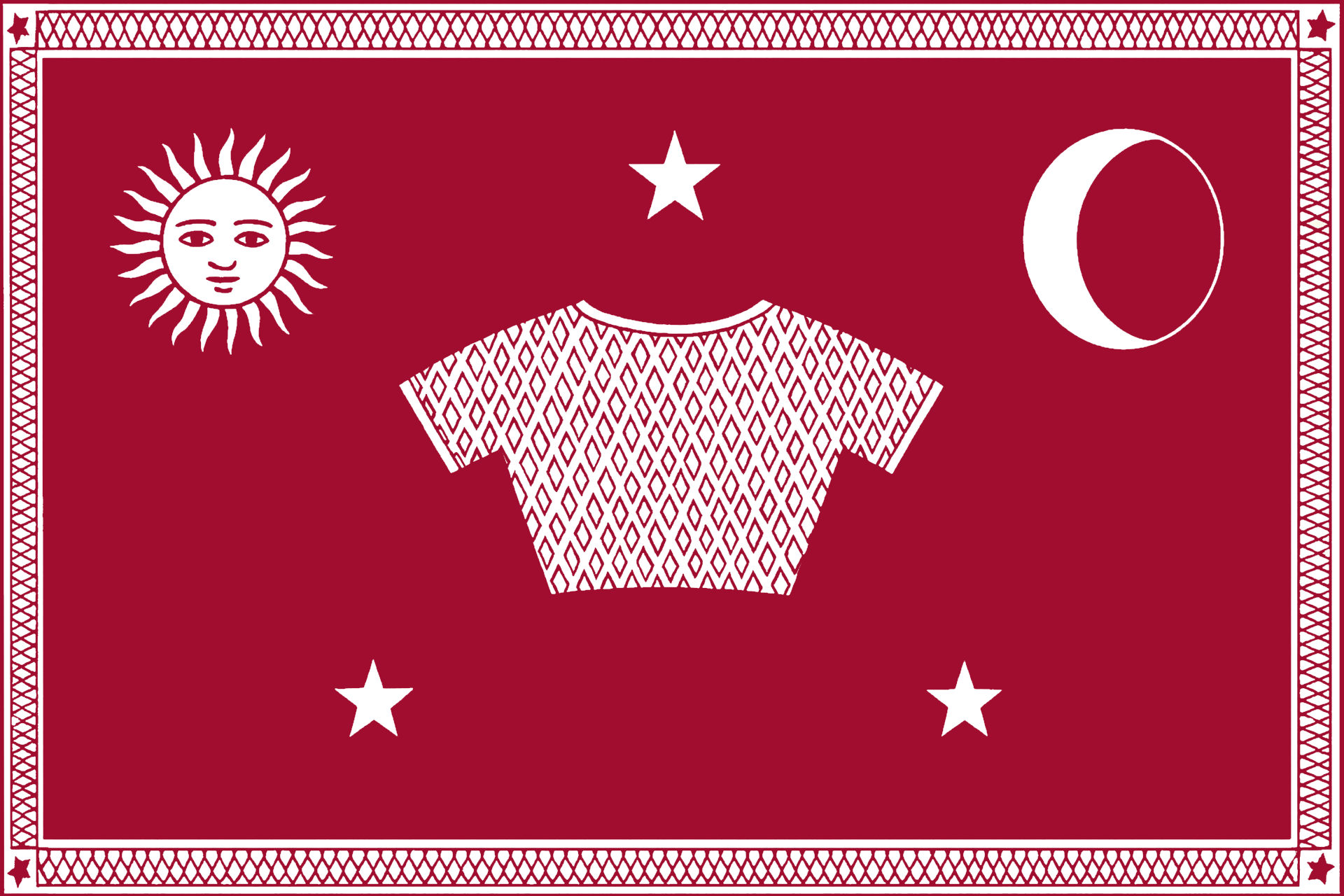
- Personal Flag "Rana del Kodiya"
- Born: Weerahannadige Francisco Fernando (full name: Weera Sanadhdhana Weera Bala Jaysooriya Patabendi Fransisco Fernando); November 7, 1812; Uyana, Moratuwa, Western Province, Kingdom of Kandy
- Died: August 8, 1848 (aged 35); Bogambara grounds, Kandy, Central Province, British Ceylon
- Cause of death: Executed by the British by firing squad
- Citizenship: Kandyan (Sinhalese)
- Occupations: Political, Economic and Social revolutionary
- Known for: A leader in the Rebellion of 1848
- Height: 5 ft 7 1/2 in (171 cm)
- Title: Kings sword bearer
- Spouse: Bandaramenike (1847)
- Children: One daughter
- Parent(s): Kalistoru Fernando (Father); Madam Helena Nonis (Mother)
- Relatives: Marcellenus Fernando (Uncle); Gunnepana Arachchi (Father in Law)

Weerahannadige Francisco Fernando, colloquially known by his nickname Puran Appu (Sinhala පුරන් අප්පු) is one of the notable figures of Sri Lanka's post-Kandyan history. Regarded colloquially as a national hero, his staunch resistance against British rule made him a symbol of independence and patriotism within many Sri Lankans. He was born on 7 November 1812 and raised in the coastal town of Moratuwa. He left Moratuwa with his family at the age of 13 in the aftermath of a village dispute and stayed in Ratnapura with his uncle, who was the first Sinhalese proctor, eventually settling in Uva Province. In early 1847, he met and married Bandara Menike, the daughter of Gunnepana Arachchi in Kandy.

Despite being an instrumental leader in leading the Matale Rebellion in 1848, the subsequent brutal suppression of the uprising by the British led to his capture along with Gongalegoda Banda and Ven. Kudapola Thera. He was executed by a firing squad on August 8, 1848, with his body being buried in Matale.

== Legacy ==
Puran Appu lived in Sri Lanka during the period of British colonial rule. Like many other Sri Lankans, Appu gradually grew opposed towards the British. On the 28th of July 1848, Puran Appu initiated a decisive assault on Matale, leading to the city's successful capture, despite the failures of other rebel leaders who besieging Kurunegala and Wariyapola.

In a letter written by Governor George Byng, 7th Viscount Torrington towards Earl Grey, the Secretary of State for War and the Colonies in London dating to October 9, 1849, stated:

“I remind you of the last words of Puranappu. He held up his hands and said if there had been half a dozen such men as me to lead, there would not be a white man living in the Kandyan Province. This is true. If there had been such leaders, without doubt for a time we should have lost the country.”

== Role in the Matale Rebellion ==
Francisco (Veera Puran Appu) attended the Wesleyan school in Moratuwa and was a very mischievous boy. After a fight and thrashing the village headman from Lakshapathiya, he fled from Moratuwa in 1825 at the age of 13. He traveled about the country, mostly the hill country – Haldummulla to Badulla and other places. His uncle, W. Marcellenus Franciscu Fernando, was the first Sinhalese proctor who had a flourishing practice at Ratnapura and in 1840 Francisco stayed with him.

It was at this stage of his career that he headed a band of outlaws and initiated a reign of terror against European planters and officials in Uva, much to the delight of his people, his exploits against the Europeans soon made him a hero in Sri Lanka.

He was now convinced of the necessity of expelling the British from Sri Lanka.

With this end in view, he conferred with the Sangha of Mahiyangana and Muthiyangana who pledged him their support. This was in 1845. He married a highland woman, Bandara Menike of Harispattuwa, in 1847. They had a daughter. Francisco was now called Puran Appu. He broke into House of Magistrate Dawson of Badulla and was imprisoned and then broke prison. He cursed Major Rodgers who brought a false charge against him and Major Rodgers was struck by lightning in Nuwara Eliya.

The Gazette notification by the Colonial Secretary, Sir James Emerson Tennent on January 1, 1847, offered 10 pounds for his apprehension and described him as follows

“Puranappu originally of Morette, lately of Kandy, trade – unknown, caste – fisher (Karava), aged 34 years, height 5 ft 71/2 inches, hair – long and black, eyes – light hazel, complexion – light, well looking, make – well made, stout, marks of punishment on the back and 4 vaccination marks.

After three weeks of preparation in the early hours of July 28, 1848, a crowd of eight to ten thousand men under Puranappu's leadership armed with guns, spears and knives set off for Kandy from Dambulla.

The plan was for Puranappu, Gongalagoda Banda and Dingirala to go in three different directions then meet at Katugastota and attack Kandy on Sunday, 30 July.

Puranappu's army first attacked Fort McDowl in Matale. Government buildings and property were ransacked – kachcheries, jails, rest houses and court house records. The coffee stores of Lieutenant General Herbert Maddock, a key adviser to the Government in Kandy was set on fire. Puran Appu was successful in capturing Matale for a while and the people in another demonstration of popular fervor, proclaimed him King of Kandy.

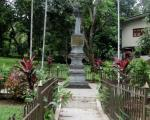

His success, however, was short-lived. An ill-trained army, equipped with primitive weapons was no match for the superior arms and organisation of the British Half-way between Matale and Kandy, the Sinhala forces, depleted by desertions and their movements betrayed by traitors, were intercepted by British troops and Puran Appu himself was captured and taken to Kandy. With his capture, the Rebellion fizzled out.

Brought to trial before a Court Martial, he was found guilty of having waged war against H.M. Queen Victoria and condemned to be shot.

On August 8, 1848, on the banks of the Bogambara Wewa, Veera Puran Appu was executed.

== Legacy ==
Weera Puran Appu Vidyalaya, a school in Moratuwa is named after him. A new frog species found from Adam's Peak, was named Pseudophilautus puranappu, by the researchers for his great dedication to protect the country from foreign invasions. A biographical film of Puran Appu was made on 1978, where Ravindra Randeniya acted as Puran Appu.

== See also ==
- Matale Rebellion
- Gongalegoda Banda
