= Land Settlement Ordinance =

Sri Lankan legislation

State Council of Ceylon
- Citation: Ordinance No. 20 of 1931
- Territorial extent: British Ceylon
- Enacted by: State Council of Ceylon
- Enacted: 1931
- Status: In force

The Land Settlement Ordinance No. 20 of 1931 also known as the Land Settlement Ordinance was a legislation in British Ceylon on 5 November 1931 to adjudicate land ownership, formalize titles, and facilitate the redistribution of land for agricultural development. Enacted by the State Council of Ceylon, during the transition to limited self-rule under the Donoughmore Constitution; the ordinance was a key component of early land reform efforts driven by D. S. Senanayake, then Minister of Agriculture and Lands. It aimed to address the displacement of rural communities by the colonial plantation economy and the growing landlessness among peasants.

== Provisions of the Ordinance ==
The ordinance empowered Settlement Officers to:

- Conduct public inquiries into land claims,
- Determine ownership and usage rights based on documents or testimony,
- Classify land as private, communal, or crown,
- Issue titles, grants, and permits,
- Prepare village settlement registers and land maps.

Appeals could be made to the District Court or the Supreme Court, but the bureaucratic nature of the process often disadvantaged illiterate or marginalized rural populations.

== See also ==
- Land Development Ordinance
- State Lands Ordinance
