= David Douglas Wemyss =

General David Douglas Wemyss

7th General Officer Commanding, Ceylon
- In office 1804–?
- Preceded by: Hay MacDowall
- Succeeded by: Thomas Maitland

Military service
- Allegiance: United Kingdom
- Branch/service: British Army
- Rank: General
- Commands: General Officer Commanding, Ceylon

General David Douglas Wemyss (1760–1839) was a British Army officer. Born Douglas, he changed his name to Wemyss circa 1790.

He was the seventh General Officer Commanding, Ceylon, appointed in 1804. He was succeeded by Thomas Maitland.

At Tottenham in December 1810, he married Elizabeth Tuckett, daughter of Elias Tuckett and Sarah Merchant, of Bath. He was at the time Governor of Tynemouth Castle and Cliffe Fort, having been appointed to the position in May 1809. He had a son by a previous marriage.

Military offices
Preceded by Hay MacDowall	General Officer Commanding, Ceylon; 1804–?	Succeeded by Thomas Maitland
