= Sannas =

17th century cotton cloth produced at Orrisa

Sannas (Sannoes, Sanna, Sannah, Sannoe, Sanoe) was a cotton cloth from the 17th century. This fabric was plain weave cotton, which was produced in the Indian state of Orissa. After 1640, huge quantities of Sannas were exported to Europe. Sannas, Cassas, and Bafta were among the Indian textiles exported for shirting and sheeting uses. Sanna was mostly white or blue in colour.

Bengal's description of piece goods for the Cape market includes Sannoes in the list along with Nainsook, and different variations of Bafta such as ''Chittabully Baftaes, and Callapatty Baftaes''.

== See also ==
- Bafta cloth
