= Madduma Bandara Ehelapola =

Sri Lankan hero (1806–1814)

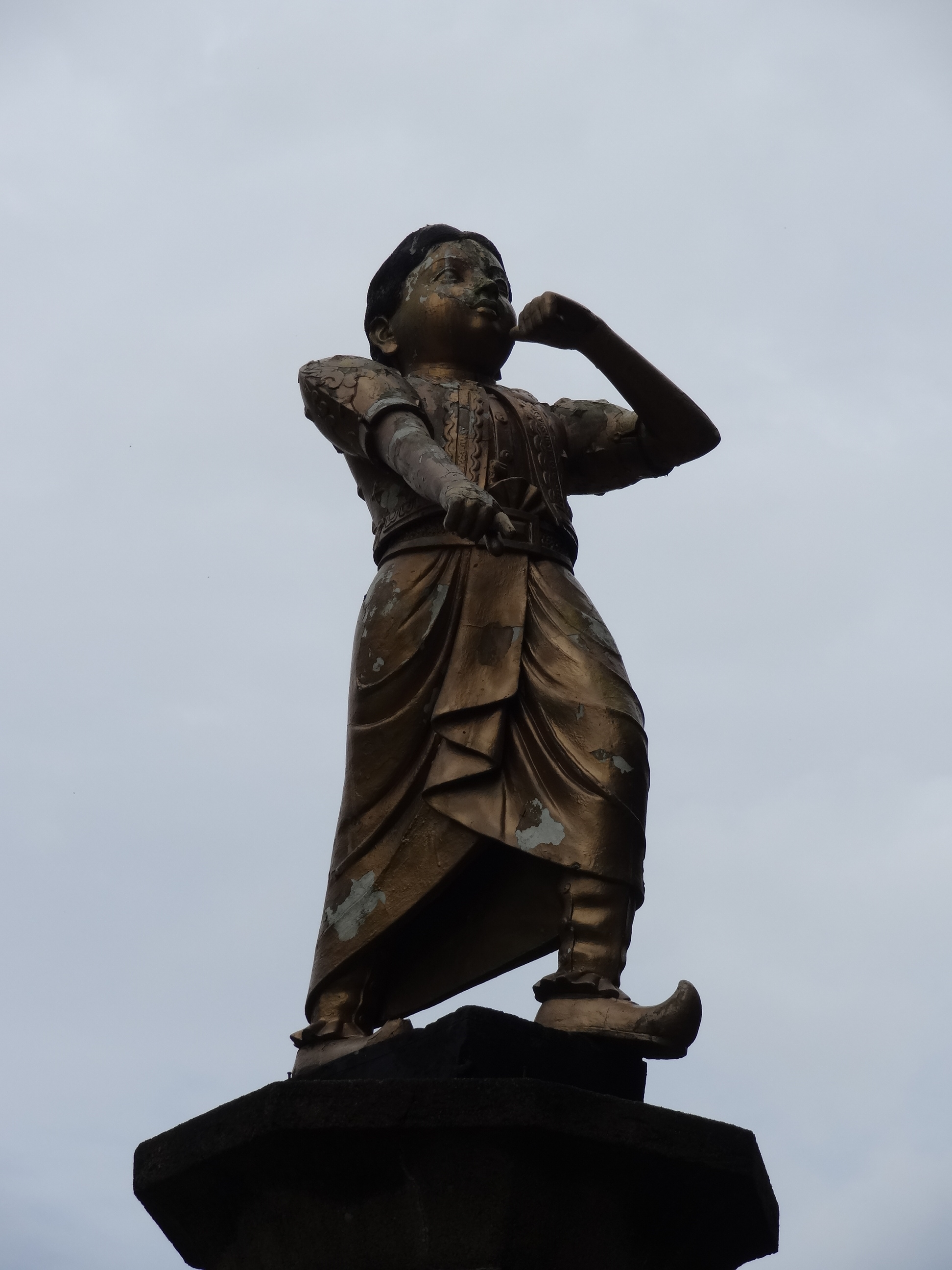
- Statue of Ehelepola Madduma Bandara in front of Sri Dalada Maligawa Kandy
- Born: Ehelapola Wijesundara Wickremasinghe Chandrasekara Amarakoon Wasala Mudiyanse Madduma Bandara; 1806; Kandy, Kingdom of Kandy
- Died: 17 May 1814 (aged 7–8); Kandy, Kingdom of Kandy
- Cause of death: Executed by beheading
- Resting place: Sri Lanka
- Other name: Madduma Bandara
- Known for: As a child hero in Sri Lanka who faced death fearlessly.
- Parent(s): Ehelapola Maha Adikaram (Father), Ehelapola Kumarihamy (Mother)
- Relatives: Loku Bandara (Brother), Tikiri Manike (Sister) and Dingiri Menike(Sister), Keppetipola Disawe(Maternal Uncle)

Madduma Bandara Ehelapola (b 1806), mostly known as Madduma Bandara, was one of the national heroes of Sri Lanka. Bandara and his family were executed in 1814 by the King for treachery. His bravery at the time of his execution made him a legendary child hero in Sri Lanka.

== Early life ==
Statue of Ehelepola Madduma Bandara at Temple of the Tooth

Bandara was born in a prominent Sinhalese aristocratic family of the Kandy to Ehelepola Maha Disawe and Ehelepola Kumarihamy. He was the second son of Ehelepola Maha Disawe, the Dissava of Sabaragamuwa under the King Sri Vikrama Rajasinha of Kandy Sri Lanka. He had an Elder brother (Loku Bandara) and two sisters (Tikiri Menike and Dingiri Menike). His uncle was Keppetipola Disawe, one of the prominent Kandyan leaders who signed the Kandyan Convention at the Audience Hall in Kandy on 2 March 1815.

== Execution ==
King Sri Wickremarajasinha thought that Ehelapola, as the Disawe of Sabaragamuwa, was aiding the rebellion against British rule, due to false information given to the king. Ehelapola was strongly fighting against the British, but the King was furious thinking that Ehelapola had switched sides. So while Ehelapola was away from Kandy, the King ordered the arrest of the Ehelapola Family. However, the king could not arrest Ehelapola, as he was in British custody in Colombo. Instead, the king arrested Ehelapola’s wife and children. On 17 May 1814, his sons were beheaded. Ehelapola’s wife, kumarihami, and daughters were forcibly drowned in Bogambara Lake by tying stones around their necks. While Bandara's brother was frightened to face death, he stepped forward and asked the executioner to behead him with a single strike.

“One single instance of no distant date will be acknowledged to include everything which is barbarous and unprincipled in public rule, and to portray the last stage of individual depravity and wickedness, the obliteration of every trace of conscience, and the complete extinction of human feeling. In the deplorable fate of the wife and children of Eheylapola Adikar these assertions are fully substantiated; in which was exhibited the savage scene of four infant children, the youngest torn from the mother’s breast, cruelly butchered, and their heads bruised in a mortar by the hands of their parent; succeeded by the execution of the woman herself and three females more, whose limbs being bound, and a heavy stone tied round the neck of each, they were thrown into a lake and drowned.”

— Extract from Sir Robert Brownrigg’s (the Governor) official declaration to the Kandian chiefs after the taking of the Kandyan country.

== See also ==
- Kingdom of Kandy
