= Ceylon Rifle Regiment =

- Active: 1795–1873
- Country: Ceylon
- Type: Light Infantry
- Part of: British Army
- Garrison/HQ: RHQ – Rifle Green, Colombo
- Nickname(s): CRR
- Engagements: Kandyan Wars; Uva Rebellion 1818; Matale Rebellion 1848

The Ceylon Rifle Regiment (CRR) was a regular native regiment formed by the British in Ceylon. Its history goes back to 1795.

The nucleus of the Regiment was two companies of Malays recruited from among prisoners at St Helena. In 1795 there were some 300 prisoners there taken from vessels of the Dutch East India Company. Some 70 or 80 Danes, Norwegians, and Swedes joined the British East India Company. The Malays apparently were glad to serve under British command as they found the treatment they received much better than that to which the Dutch had subjected them. The men of the two companies were trained as artillerymen. After about two years, the companies were transferred to Bencoolen, and later from there to Ceylon.

In all, five independent companies of Malays were transferred from Dutch to HEIC service. Since then the regiment under different names fought for the British in the Kandyan War and the Uva Rebellion of 1818.

The Ceylon Rifle Regiment saw action in the Matale Rebellion in 1848. Since it served no practical application it was disbanded in 1873.

== Trivia ==
- The regiment's officers' mess is now known as Visumpaya.
- The regiment's barracks, known as the Rifle Barracks, after being abandoned for a long time has been refurbished and in 2007 turned into the National Defence Services’ School, Colombo.

== Citations and references ==
Citations

References

- Brooke, Thomas Henry (1824) A History of the Island of St. Helena, from its discovery by the Portuguese to the year 1806. (Kingsbury, Padbury & Allen).

== See also ==
- Sri Lanka Army

== External links and sources ==
- Sri Lanka Army
- Ceylon Defence Force
