= Matale Municipal Council =

Local council for Matale

Matale Municipal Council මාතලේ මහ නගර සභා

Type
- Type: Local authority

History
- Founded: 1963; 63 years ago
- Preceded by: Matale Urban Council (1936 - 1963)

Leadership
- Mayor: Ashoka Kottahachchi, (NPP) since 6 May 2025
- Deputy Mayor: M. Morgan, (CWC) since 6 May 2025

Structure
- Seats: 22
- Political groups: Government: NPP (10); CWC (2); Opposition: SJB (6); SB (1); SLPP (1); UNA (1); UNP (1)

Elections
- Voting system: Open list proportional representation
- Last election: 6 May 2025
- Next election: TBD

The Matale Municipal Council (Sinhala: මාතලේ මහ නගර සභා mātalē maha nagara sabhāva) is the local council for Matale. It is a large regional city located in the heart of island's central hills, it is the capital and largest city in Matale district.

The council was formed in 1963 under the Municipalities Ordinance Act of 1865. It has 21 elected representatives, comprising ten seats held by the United National Party, four seats by the Sri Lanka Freedom Party and six by Sri Lanka Podujana Peramuna.

== Administrative units ==
Matale Municipal Council is divided into 52 Grama Niladhari Divisions (GN Divisions).

== List of mayors ==
The mayor of Matale is the head of Matale Municipal Council and his office is located at the Matale Town Hall. The current mayor of Matale is Sandhanam Prakash.

Mayor	Tenure
Alick Aluwihare	(1963–1969)
Mohamed Thahir Hussain	(1969–1971)
Mohamed Thahir Hussain	(1979–1983)
Vidana Gamage Jinadasa	(1969–1989)
Rohana Dissanayake	(1997–2002)
Abdul Careem Mohamed Hilmy	(2002–2016)
Daljith Aluwihare	(2016 - 2020)
Sandhanam Prakash	(2020–2024)

The Municipal Council of Matale provides sewer, road management and waste management services, in case of water, electricity and telephone utility services the council liaises with the Water Supply and Drainage Board, the Ceylon Electricity Board and telephone service providers.
