= Great Rebellion of 1817–1818 =

Sinhalese (Kandyan) rebellion against British authority in 1817-1818

Uwa-Wellassa Uprising of 1817–18
- Part of the Kandyan Wars 1796-1818
Date	16 October 1817 – 26 November 1818
Location	Uva-Wellassa, British Ceylon
Result	British victory

Belligerents
Kingdom of Kandy rebels	United Kingdom of Great Britain and Ireland Radala collaborators

Commanders and leaders
Keppetipola Disawe (executed); Madugalle Nilame (executed); Ehelepola Nilame	(United Kingdom of Great Britain and Ireland) Sir Robert Brownrigg (United Kingdom of Great Britain and Ireland) John D'Oyly

Strength
Unknown – From 20,000 to 100,000 in an islandwide network.	15,000 to 24,000

Casualties and losses
8,000 to 10,000	900 to 2,000

The Great Rebellion of 1817–1818 (Sinhala: ඌව වෙල්ලස්ස මහා කැරැල්ල), also known as the 1818 Uva-Wellassa Rebellion (after the two places where it had started), was the third Kandyan War in the Uva and Wellassa provinces of the former Kingdom of Kandy, which is today the Uva province of Sri Lanka. The rebellion started against the British colonial government under Governor Robert Brownrigg, three years after the Kandyan Convention ceded the Kingdom of Kandy to the British Crown.

The rebellion was initiated by disgruntled Kandyan chiefs who did not like the British for appointing Hadji Marikar as Madige Dissawe. This position had sometimes been held by Muslims. Even as of today Madige villages in Kandy are Muslims villages. The Kandyan Sinhalese were disillusioned by the British colonial administration for not giving them all positions of authority. They murdered Hadji Marikar, gouging his eyes. This then forced the British to take action.

The rebellion gained initial success, and many Kandyan chiefs who were sent to suppress it, such as Keppetipola Disawe, later joined the rebel forces. Major Sylvester Douglas Wilson, the Assistant Resident in Badulla, was killed and the rebels soon gained much control over the region. A pretender to the throne of Kandy, Wilbawe, was then proclaimed king.

Governor Brownrigg established his field headquarters at Kandy and directed military operations against the rebels, who had resorted to hit-and-run attacks, with the assistance of Kandyan chiefs who remained loyal to Britain, including Molligoda Maha Adikaram and Ratwatte Adikaram. Brownrigg soon received reinforcements from British India. Following the capture of many rebel leaders, the rebellion eventually fizzled out as the last remaining rebel holdouts were killed or captured by the British.

== Background ==
Following the annexation of the Kandyan Kingdom by the British under the Kandyan Convention in 1815, certain British actions increasingly antagonized the Kandyan chiefs, who now found themselves under foreign administration. The disregard shown by British officials of all ranks toward high-ranking Kandyan chiefs and priests further fueled resentment.

Two incidents are believed to have sparked the revolt. The first occurred in June 1816, when Madugalle Uda Gabada Nilame secretly proposed to the chief priest the removal of the Sacred Tooth Relic of the Buddha from Kandy—without the knowledge of John D'Oyly, the British Resident in Kandy. This was followed in September 1816, when Madugalle publicly offered gifts to the deities at Bintenne and Kataragama, calling for the overthrow of the British and the restoration of a native king. The British tried Madugalle for treason, dismissed him from office, and exiled him to Colombo. His walauwa (residence) was burnt, and his possessions were confiscated and sold, with the proceeds going to a pension fund for British officers.

Another incident that inflamed Kandyan chiefs involved a direct challenge to their traditional rights—rights guaranteed under the Kandyan Convention. In September 1817, the Governor, on the recommendation of D’Oyly, appointed Haji Marikkar Travala, a Moorman from Wellasse, as Madige Muhandiram. The post of Madige Muhandiram was traditionally held by Muslims. There are four Madige villages and all of them are Muslim. The Kandyan chiefs wanted the British to give them all positions for themselves and this undermined the authority of the Millewa Dissawa. Local chiefs in Badulla, Kivulegedara Mohottala, Kohu Kumbure Rate Rala, Butawe Rate Rala and Millawe Disawa organized local protests against the Madige Muhandiram's appointment.

== Revolt begins ==
Around this time in September 1817, Major Sylvester Douglas Wilson, the Assistant Resident and Agent of the British Government in Badulla received word that a person of Malabar origin had been gathering a following in the Uva Wellasse region with claims to the throne of Kandy. It was said that this person claimed to be Wilbawe Mudiyanse Doresami, a former priest who claimed to be a relative of the former king and member of the Nayak dynasty. Wilson dispatched the newly appointed Haji Marikkar Travala Mohandiram with a detachment native soldiers to inquire into the suspected Malabar. Having reached Dankumbura in Bintenne, the Haji Marikkar gained information that Wilbawe along with some priests were at Kehelwella with the Veddas. On his way to Kehelwella, he was captured by Bootawe Rate Rala in Wellassa and was killed on Wilbawe's orders on 26 September 1817. After Major Wilson received information of Haji Marikkar's death, he set out from Badulla with a contingent of Malay soldiers under the command of Lieutenant Newman to Wellasse on 14 October 1817. He attempted negotiations with the rebels, but on 16 October 1817, while detached from the rest of the group at a stream close to Bibile with only two servants, Major Wilson and one of his servants were killed by arrows fired by Hitihami Mudiyanselage Rate Rala and his men. Lieutenant Newman was unable to recover Wilson's body and it was later claimed to have been decapitated.

In response to the killing of Major Wilson, Sir Robert Brownrigg dispatched Colonel Kelly to Badulla from Kandy on 30 October with a force of 271 European and 456 native troops while 339 European and 773 native troops remained in Kandy. Major MacDonald who was the Commandant of Badulla was dispatched to Kotabowa-Wellassa. Additional reinforcements were brought up from Galle, Matara and Hambantota. MacDonald established a fort at Paranagama, along the Kandy-Badulla road where he was accused of torturing and lynching the local population. By February 1818, the British position had deteriorated. They had abandoned all posts in the Uva Wellassa, except those needed to keep the line of communication between Badulla and Batticaloa open. Fort MacDonald was attacked by a 5,000 - 6,000 strong rebel force led by Keppetipola in February and lay siege till March.

Lord Bathurst, the Secretary of State for War and the Colonies and Brownrigg's superior in London had suggested that the latter consider leaving Kandy and withdrawing to the safety of the maritime provinces to save European lives. Brownrigg instead requested assistance from the Madras Presidency. A relief force under Brigadier Shuldham was dispatched from Madras and landed in Ceylon tilting the balance in British favor.

== Leadership ==
Keppetipola Disawe was initially sent by the British government to stop the uprising, but ended up joining the rebellion and ordering the regiment he was commanded to return to their garrison. Keppetipola Disawe joined the uprising as its leader and is today celebrated for his actions in Sri Lanka. He assisted many regional leaders in providing men and material from various regions. The other leaders who supported this independent movement were: 2nd in-charge of Gode Gedara Adikaram, Wilbawe, II Pilima Talauve Adikaram, Kohu Kumbure Rate Rala, Dimbulana Disave, Kivulegedara Mohottala, Madugalle Disave, Butewe Rate Rala, Galagoda family members, Galagedara Mohottala, Meegahapitiya Rate Rala, Dambawinna Disave, and Kurundukumbure Mohottala.

Keppitipola went up to Alupotha and joined the fighters having returned all arms and ammunition of the British. Rev. Wariyapola Sri Sumangala of Asgiriya fled to Hanguranketa with the tooth relic casket, resulting in a more vigorous phase of the Great Liberation War, as the Sinhalese believed that whoever possessed this tooth relic would be the rightful ruler of the country. By September 1817, two leaders, Madugalle Basnayake Nilame and Ehelepola Nilame, surrendered to the British, and Pilimatalawe led the rebellion. The British captured Ellepola, who was the Dissawa of Viyaluwa; also captured was a brother of Maha Adikaram Ehelepola, and both were beheaded in Bogambara on 27 October 1818.

== Great Liberation War ==
The Uwa-Wellassa Uprising was launched by Keppetipola Disawe. With the exceptions of Molligoda and Ekneligoda, many chiefs joined the uprising. The fighters captured Matale and Kandy before Keppetipola fell ill and was captured and beheaded by the British. His skull was abnormal — as it was wider than usual — and was sent to Britain for testing. It was returned to Sri Lanka after independence and now rests in the Kandyan Museum. The uprising failed due to a number of reasons. It was not well-planned by the leaders. The areas controlled by some pro-British chiefs provided easy transport routes for British supplies. Wilbawe, who was said to have a claim to the Sinhalese throne, was found not to have any relation.

== Aftermath ==
The rebellion led to the British colonial government to adopt a scorched earth policy in order to suppress it. This included the killing of cattle and other livestock, the destruction of private property (including homes and stocks of salt) and the burning of rice paddies. In the rebellion, more than 10,000 Sinhalese were killed. In addition to the scorched earth policies, the colonial government also confiscated properties owned by insurgents.

The rebellion also led the British to eventually enact mass land confiscations from the Kandyan peasantry via the Crown Lands (Encroachments) Ordinance No. 12 of 1840 (sometimes called the Crown Lands Ordinance or the Waste Lands Ordinance), a form of enclosure; the Kandyan peasantry were reduced to penury. The British found that the uplands of Sri Lanka were very suited for coffee, tea and rubber cultivation, and by the mid-19th century, Ceylon tea had become a staple of the British market, bringing great wealth to a small class of European tea planters. To work the estates, the planters imported large numbers of Tamil workers as indentured labourers from south India, who soon made up 10% of the island's population.

== Legacy ==
=== Gazette Notification ===
During the Great Liberation War, a Gazette Notification was issued by Governor Robert Brownrigg to condemn those who were fighting against British colonial rule in Ceylon. Under this decree, all participants in the uprising were branded as “traitors,” and their properties were confiscated by the colonial administration. Some were executed, while others were exiled to Mauritius.

In the years following Sri Lanka's independence successive governments repeatedly promised—but failed—to revoke this unjust Gazette Notification. It was finally brought before the Sri Lankan government on the instruction of President Maithripala Sirisena.

After parliamentary discussions, the Gazette was formally revoked in 2017 with the President’s signature. This historic act restored the honour of those who took part in the uprising, officially recognizing them as National Heroes, rather than traitors. A National Declaration was also presented to their descendants in acknowledgment of their ancestors’ sacrifice.

== See also ==
- Matale rebellion
