= Land Development Ordinance =

Sri Lankan legislation

State Council of Ceylon
- Long title: An Ordinance to provide for the development and distribution of state lands
- Citation: Ordinance No. 19 of 1935
- Territorial extent: British Ceylon
- Enacted by: State Council of Ceylon
- Enacted: 1935

Repeals
- Land Development (Amendment) Act, No. 11 of 2022
- Status: In force

Land Development Ordinance No. 19 of 1935 (LDO) was a legislation in British Ceylon by the State Council of Ceylon, during the transition to limited self-rule under the Donoughmore Constitution, to regulate the allocation, use, and development of state lands. Designed primarily to support agricultural colonization, especially in the Dry Zone.

== Provisions of the Ordinance ==
The ordinance provided the legal authority for the state to alienate crown lands to landless individuals under specified conditions. Key features included:

- Permits and Grants: Lands were distributed initially through permits (temporary cultivation rights) and later converted to grants (permanent ownership) after fulfilling cultivation conditions.
- Allotment Size: Land parcels typically ranged from 2.5 to 5 acres, suitable for subsistence farming.
- Inalienability: Lands could not be sold, mortgaged, or leased without government approval, ensuring long-term use for agriculture rather than speculation.
- Inheritance Rules: Only one heir could inherit land to prevent subdivision and preserve economic viability.
- Administrative Supervision: The Land Commissioner’s Department was created to administer the program and ensure compliance.
