= Matale rebellion =

1848 rebellion in British Ceylon

Matale rebellion (මාතලේ කැරැල්ල)
- Part of the Kandyan Wars 1796-1818
- The late insurrection in Ceylon (The Illustrated London News, 1850)
Date	1848
Location	British Ceylon
Result	British victory * Rebellion quelled

Belligerents
Kandyan rebels	United Kingdom: British Ceylon

Commanders and leaders
Paranagama Nilame; Gongalegoda Banda; Veera Puran Appu (executed); Suriya Bandara Paranagama; Swarnapali Paranagama Kumarihami; Dingirala; Dines; Diyes; Giranegama Thera; Kudapola Thera (executed)	(United Kingdom) George Byng, 7th Viscount Torrington

Units involved
Rebel Volunteers	Green Howards 19th Regiment of Foot Ceylon Rifle Regiment

Strength
4000	Unknown

Casualties and losses
Unknown	Unknown

The Matale rebellion, also known as the Rebellion of 1848, took place in Matale city, Ceylon against the British colonial government under Governor George Byng, 7th Viscount Torrington. It marked a transition from the classic feudal form of anti-colonial revolt to modern independence struggles. It was fundamentally a peasant revolt.

== Background ==
The Kandyan provinces were in a state of turmoil. They had endured British rule for 32 years. Under the Crown Lands (Encroachments) Ordinance No. 12 of 1840 (also called the Crown Lands Ordinance or the Waste Lands Ordinance), European planters expropriated the common land of the Kandyan peasantry, reducing them to penury. In the 1830s, coffee was introduced into Ceylon, a crop that thrives in the island’s highlands, and it was cultivated on lands seized from the peasants. This expansion of coffee cultivation was driven largely by the decline of coffee production in the West Indies following the abolition of slavery there.

However, the dispossessed Kandyan peasants were not employed on these new plantations. They steadfastly refused to abandon their traditional subsistence lifestyles and to work as wage labourers under the harsh and demeaning conditions that prevailed on the estates—despite persistent pressure from the colonial administration. Faced with this resistance, the British turned to India to supply labour for their profitable new enterprise. An infamous system of indentured labour was introduced, through which hundreds of thousands of Tamil labourers—derisively referred to as “coolies”—were brought from southern India to work on the coffee plantations of Ceylon.

Meanwhile, an economic depression in the United Kingdom severely affected Ceylon’s coffee and cinnamon industries. Planters and merchants clamoured for a reduction in export duties. Sir James Emerson Tennent, the Colonial Secretary in Colombo recommended to Earl Grey, Secretary of State for the Colonies in London, that the island's tax structure be radically altered from indirect to direct taxation. This proposal was accepted, and it was decided to abolish the export duty on coffee and to reduce that on cinnamon, leaving a deficit of £40,000 sterling to be covered through direct taxes imposed on the local population. To implement these reforms, Lord Torrington, a 35-year old cousin of Prime Minister Lord Russell, was dispatched by Queen Victoria to serve as Governor of Ceylon.

On 1 July 1848, a series of new taxes was imposed: license fees on guns, dogs, carts, and shops, as well as compulsory labour on plantation roads unless a special tax was paid in lieu. These measures struck harshly not only at the finances but also at the traditions and dignity of the Kandyan peasantry. Discontent spread rapidly, and a mass movement against these oppressive taxes began to take shape. Deprived of the leadership of their native king—deposed in 1815—and their chiefs—either crushed after the Uva-Wellassa Rebellion or co-opted by the colonial administration—the Kandyan people rose in defiance. For the first time, leadership of resistance in the Kandyan provinces passed into the hands of ordinary people, marking the beginning of a new phase in the struggle against colonial rule.

In 1847, due to the British government's unlimited tax policy, efforts to destroy Sinhala Buddhist culture, and the persecution of the indigenous people, this battle was started by Paranagama Nilame in the Paranagama village of Matale with the aim of saving the country, nation and Buddhism. This battle was also called the Battle of Paranagama. This was completed in 1848 with the leadership and support of leaders such as Veera Puran Appu, Diyes and Gongalegoda Banda.

== Rebellion ==
On 26 July 1848, the leaders of the uprising, along with their supporters, gathered at the historic Dambulla Vihara. At 11.30 a.m., Gongalegoda Banda was formally consecrated as king by the chief monk of Dambulla, Ven. Giranegama Thera. He was bestowed the regal title "Sri Wickrama Subha Sarva Siddhi Rajasinghe". Addressing the assembly, Gongalegoda Banda asked the people whether they were on the side of the Buddhists or the British. On the same day, his brother Dines was declared the sub-king and Dingirirala as the uncrowned king of the Sat Korale (Seven Counties). Veera Puran Appu was appointed Prime Minister and the Sword Bearer to Gongalegoda Banda and attended the consecration ceremony accompanied with nearly 4000 supporters.

Following the proclamation of the new king, Gongalegoda Banda and his army departed Dambulla via Matale, determined to capture Kandy from the British. Along their march, they launched attacks on several government establishments, including the Matale Kachcheri, and destroyed a number of tax records—a symbolic act of defiance against colonial oppression. Simultaneously, Dingirirala instigated attacks in Kurunegala, where the confrontation resulted in the deaths of eight people at the hands of British forces. In response to the escalating rebellion, Governor Lord Torrington immediately declared martial law on 29 July 1848 in Kandy and subsequently in Kurunegala on 31 July.

Veera Puran Appu was captured by British troops and was executed on 8 August 1848. Gongalegoda Banda and his younger brother Dines managed to escape and went into hiding. Gongalegoda Banda took refuge in a cave at Elkaduwa, 13 kilometres (8.1 mi) from Matale. In an effort to suppress the rebellion completely, Governor Lord Torrington issued a warrant for Banda's arrest offering a reward of £150 for information on his whereabouts. On 21 September 1848, he was finally arrested by Malay soldiers, after offering resistance, and was subsequently taken from Matale to Kandy where he was imprisoned.

The trial of Gongalegoda Banda commenced on 27 November 1848 at the Supreme Court sessions in Kandy. He was charged with high treason for proclaiming himself the King of Kandy and waging war against the British Crown. When the charges were read, Gongalegoda Banda admitted his guilt and took full responsibility for his actions. The Supreme Court condemned him to be hanged on 1 January 1849. However, a later proclamation by the colonial authorities commuted his sentence to flogging—100 lashes—and deportation to Malacca (in present-day Malaysia).

== Leaders ==
The Matale Rebellion of 1848 was led by a group of prominent figures, including Paranagama Nilame, his daughter Swarnapali Paranagama Kumarihami (Thammanna Manike), his son Suriyabandara Paranagama Nilame—who was regarded as the King of Matale— (The current heir of that lineage is Rusiru Paranagama Nilame, the co-founder and Secretary General of the Association of Siwhele Traditional Aristocrats) as well as Gongalegoda Banda, Dingirala, Dines, Diyes, and Veera Puran Appu. They were supported by the people and village headmen of Matale, who rallied around their leadership.

Many of these leaders were workers with connections to the Low Country, and they possessed a broader vision and understanding of the colonial system than the Kandyan peasants they inspired and led into rebellion.

=== Gongalegoda Banda ===
Gongalegoda Banda, the son of Wansapurna Dewage Sinchia Fernando emerged as the leader of the 1848 Rebellion and was later proclaimed the King of Kandy. Before the uprising, he had been employed by the colonial police and eventually settled in Gongalegoda, Udunuwara where he became a well-known and respected figure among the Kandyans. Shortly before the rebellion erupted, he was seen visiting the Temple of the Tooth, a site of great political and spiritual significance in Kandy. On 6 July 1848, Gongalegoda Banda led a protest march near Kandy Kachcheri, voicing strong opposition to the unjust taxes imposed by the British colonial government.

=== Veera Puran Appu ===
Weerahennedige Francisco Fernando alias Veera Puran Appu is one of the most colourful personalities in Sri Lanka's history. He was born in November 1812 in the coastal town of Moratuwa. He left Moratuwa at the age of 13 and stayed in Ratnapura with his uncle, who was the first Sinhalese proctor, and moved to the Uva Province. In early 1847, he met and married Bandaramenike, the daughter of Gunnepana Arachchi in Kandy.

Despite being an instrumental leader in leading the Matale Rebellion in 1848, the subsequent brutal suppression of the uprising by the British led to his capture along with Gongalegoda Banda and Ven. Kudapola Thera. He was executed by a firing squad on August 8, 1848, with his body being buried in Matale.

== Legacy ==
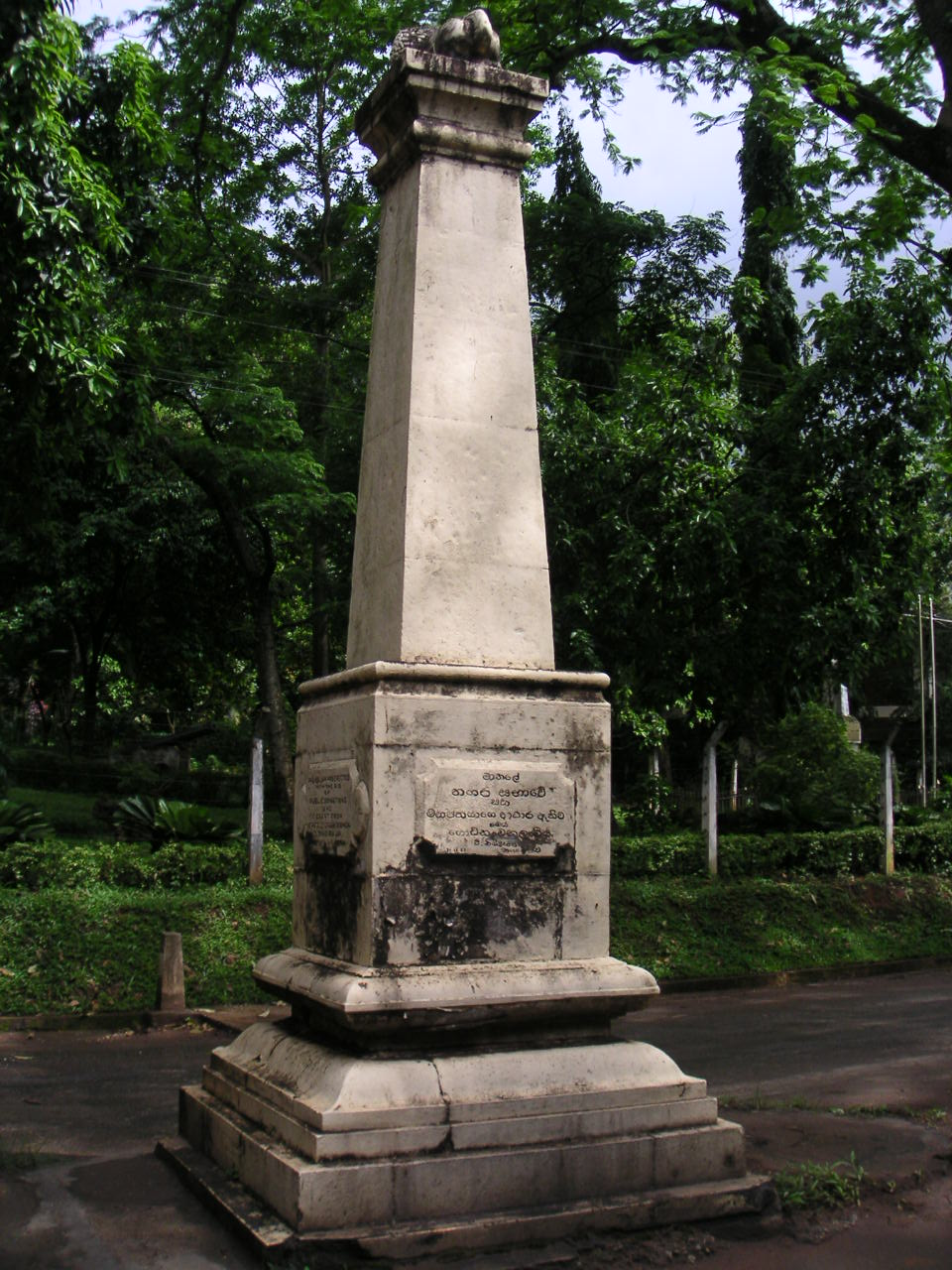
Memorial of the Matale Rebellion in Matale

The Matale Rebellion of 1848 marked the first transitional step away from the feudal form of revolt, representing a fundamentally peasant uprising. The masses, long deprived of traditional leadership—since their native king had been deposed in 1815 and their chiefs either destroyed after the Uva Wellassa Rebellion or co-opted by the colonial authorities—rose up under new, popular leaders. For the first time in the history of the Kandyan provinces, leadership passed into the hands of ordinary people. These new leaders were yeomen and artisans, reminiscent of the Levellers of the English Civil War and the mechanics and patriots such as Paul Revere and Thomas Paine who were at the heart of the American Revolution. The old feudal class had been crushed and rendered powerless, while no new class capable of directing the struggle toward political power had yet emerged.

== See also ==
- Fort MacDowall
- Great Rebellion of 1817–18
- Revolutions of 1848
