= Matale Divisional Secretariat =

- Divisional Secretariat
- Interactive map of Matale Divisional Secretariat
- Country: Sri Lanka
- Province: Central Province
- District: Matale District
- Time zone: UTC+5:30 (Sri Lanka Standard Time)

Matale Divisional Secretariat is a Divisional Secretariat of Matale District, of Central Province, Sri Lanka.

== Demography-Religion ==
Religion in Matale DS Division (2012)
1. Buddhist (61.3%)
2. Hindu (16.7%)
3. Muslim (19.2%)
4. Roman Catholic (1.90%)
5. Other Christian (1.00%)
6. Other (0.00%)
