= Parapet =

Barrier extending upward a wall at the edge of a roof

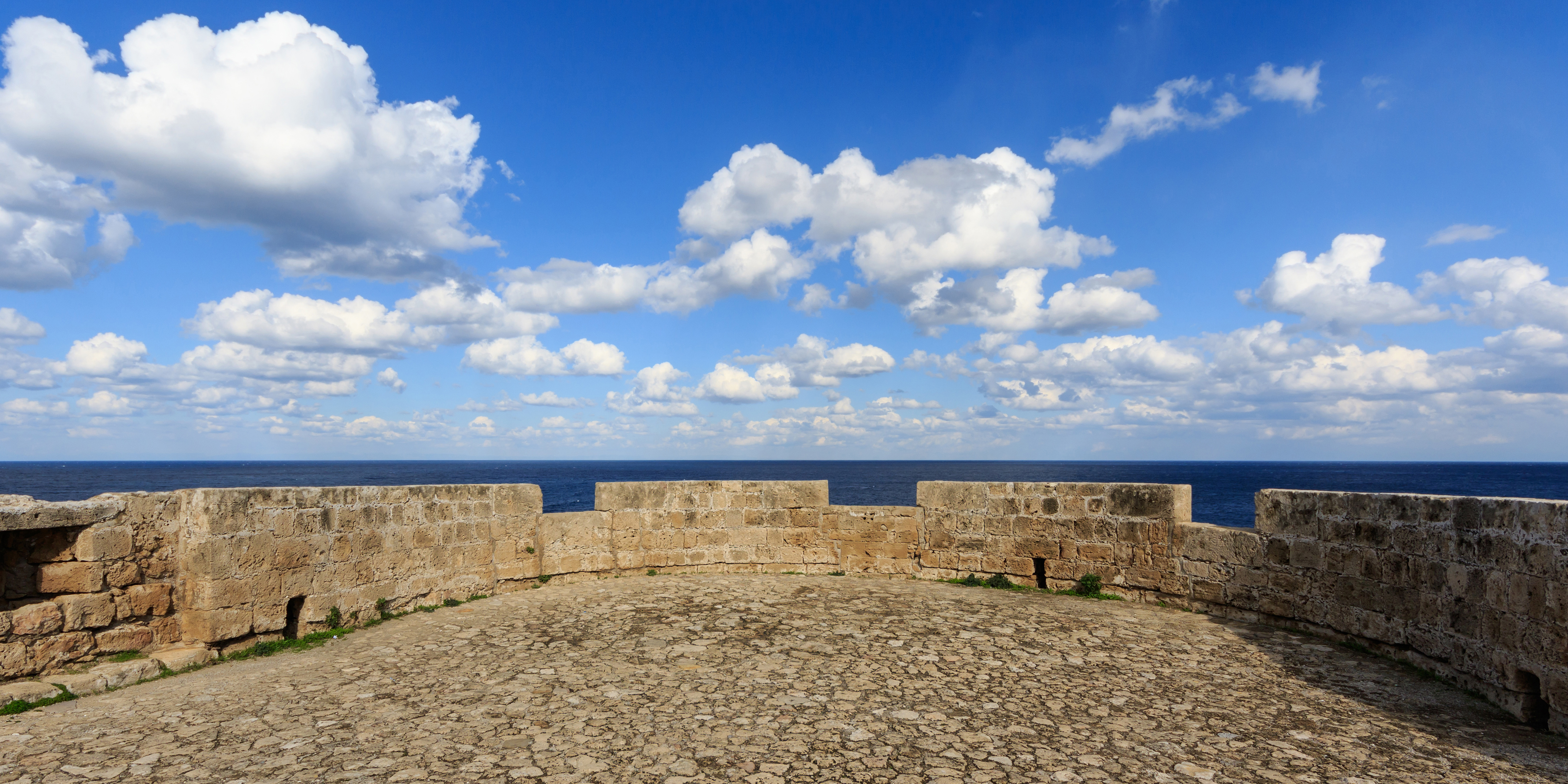
The crenellated parapet on a bastion of Kyrenia Castle, Cyprus

A parapet is a barrier that is an upward extension of a wall at the edge of a roof, terrace, balcony, walkway or other structure. The word derives from the Italian parapetto (parare 'to cover/defend' and petto 'chest/breast'). Where extending above a roof, a parapet may simply be the portion of an exterior wall that continues above the edge line of the roof surface, or may be a continuation of a vertical feature beneath the roof such as a fire wall or party wall. Parapets were originally used to defend buildings from military attack, but today they are primarily used as guard rails, to conceal rooftop equipment, reduce wind loads on the roof, and to prevent the spread of fires.

== Parapet types ==
Parapets may be plain, embattled, perforated or panelled, which are not mutually exclusive terms.

- Plain parapets are upward extensions of the wall, sometimes with a coping at the top and corbel below.
- Embattled parapets may be panelled, but are pierced, if not purely as stylistic device, for the discharge of defensive projectiles.
- Perforated parapets are pierced in various designs such as circles, trefoils, or quatrefoils.
- Panelled parapets are ornamented by a series of panels, either oblong or square, and more or less enriched, but not perforated. These are common in the Decorated and Perpendicular periods.
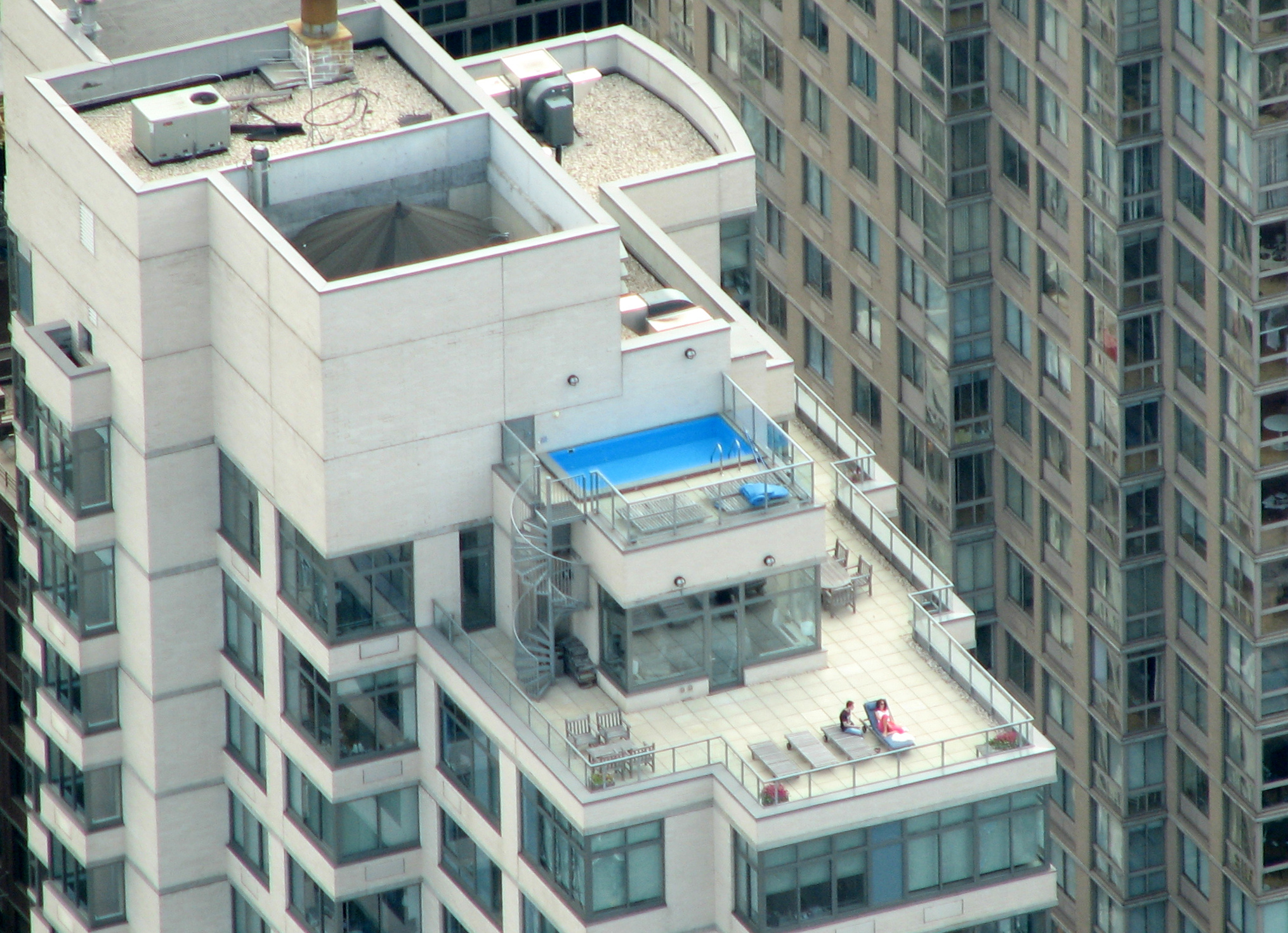
A parapet surrounds a New York City rooftop, shielding the HVAC and water tank and supporting the glass guardrails.

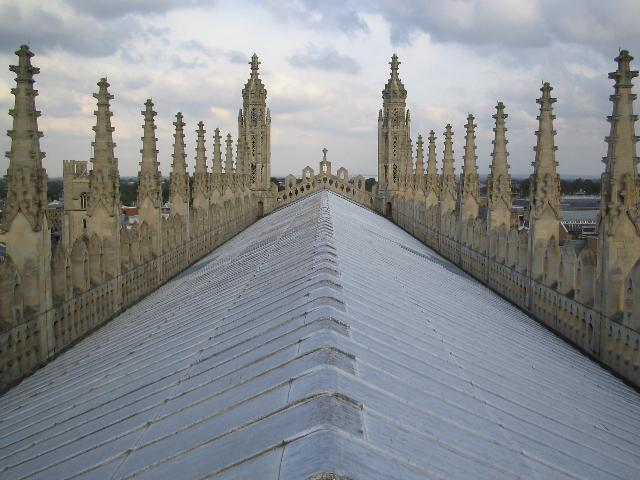
Elaborate parapets flank the roof of King's College Chapel, Cambridge.

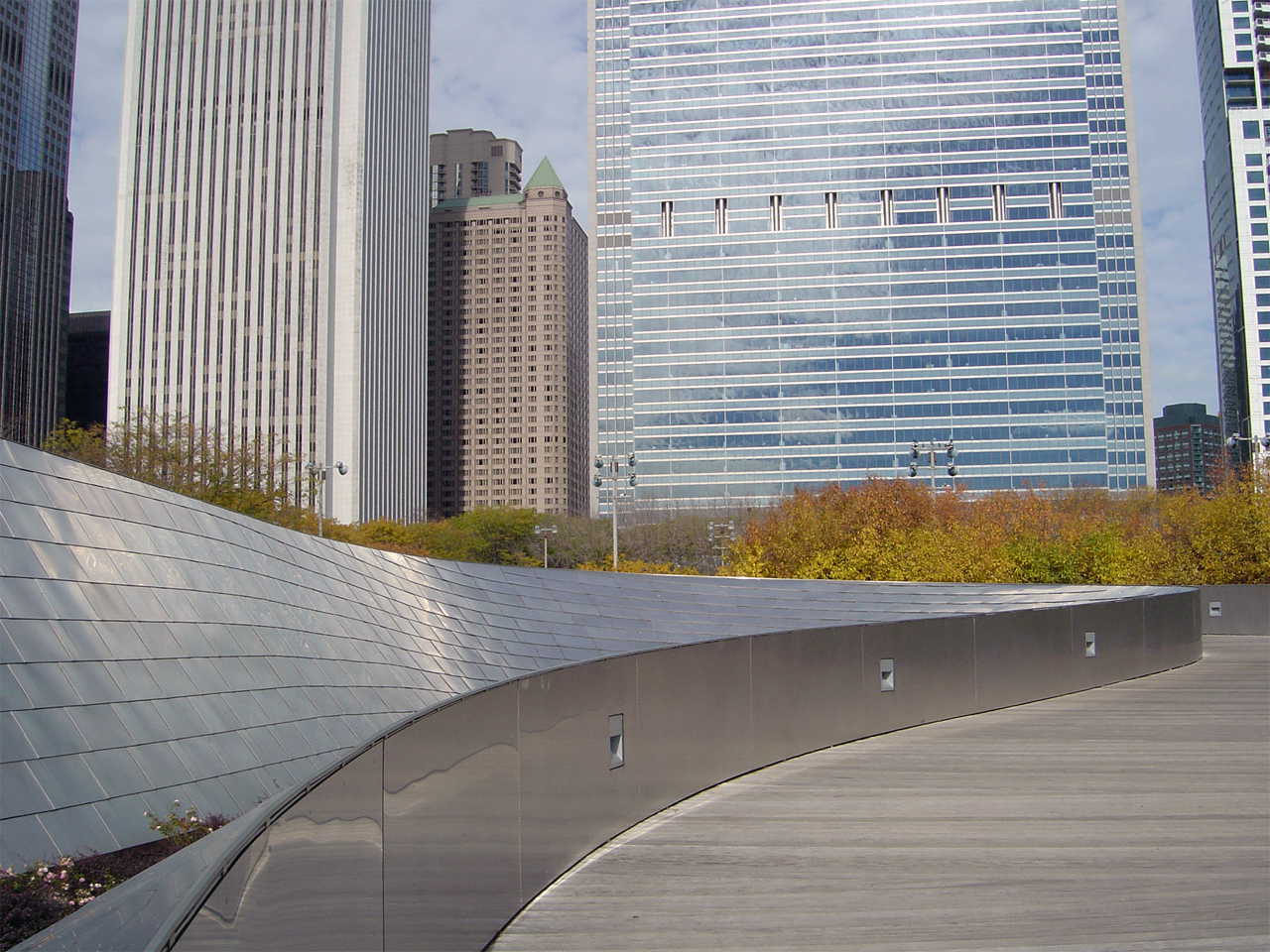
A modern parapet with integrated lighting functions as a guard rail along the BP Pedestrian Bridge in Chicago

== Historic parapet walls ==
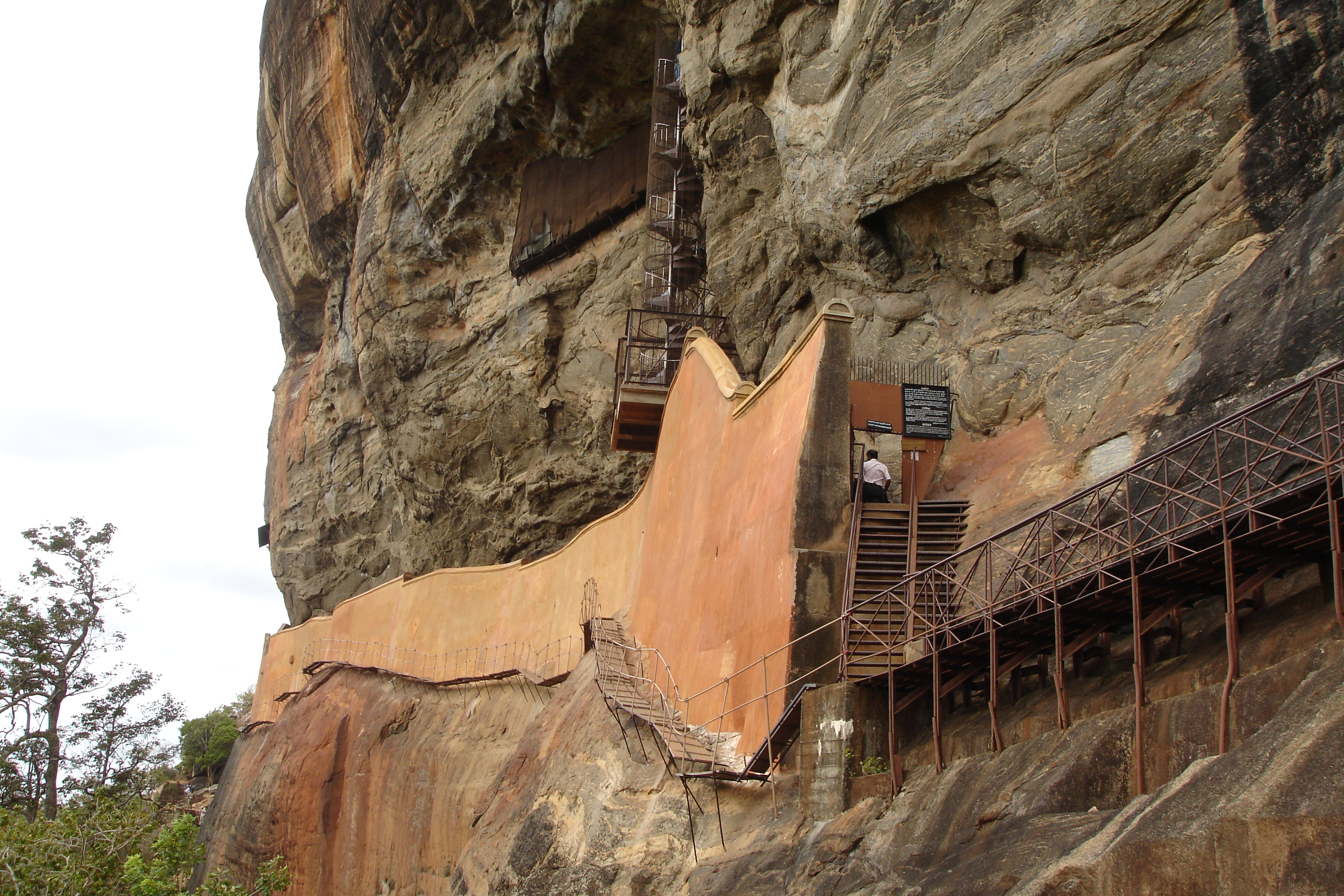
The Mirror Wall at Sigiriya, Sri Lanka

The Mirror Wall at Sigiriya, Sri Lanka built between 477 and 495 AD is one of the few surviving protective parapet walls from antiquity. Built onto the side of Sigiriya Rock it ran for a distance of approximately 250 meters (270 yards) and provided protection from inclement weather. Only about 100 meters (110 yards) of this wall exists today, but brick debris and grooves on the rock face along the western side of the rock clearly show where the rest of this wall once stood.

== Parapet roofs ==
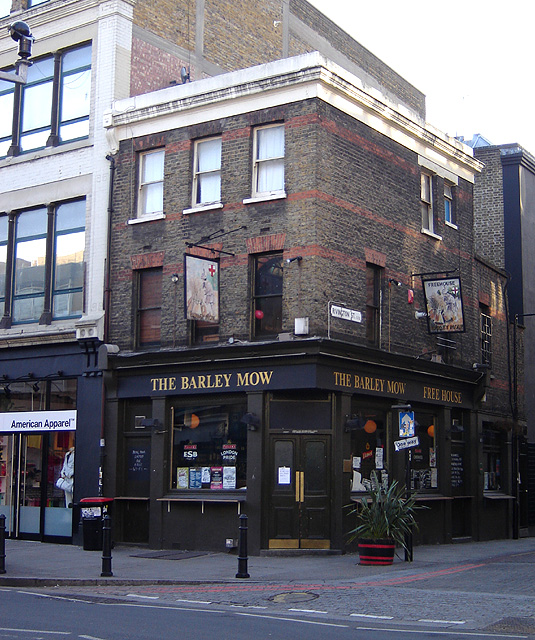
A decorative parapet rings the flat roof of this English public house

Parapets surrounding roofs are common in London. This dates from the Building Act 1707 which banned projecting wooden eaves in the cities of Westminster and London as a fire risk. Instead an 18-inch brick parapet was required, with the roof set behind. This was continued in many Georgian houses, as it gave the appearance of a flat roof which accorded with the desire for classical proportions.

In Shilpa Shastras, the ancient Indian science of sculpture, a parapet is known as hāra. It is optionally added while constructing a temple. The hāra can be decorated with various miniature pavilions, according to the Kāmikāgama. In the Bible the Hebrews are obligated to build a parapet on the roof of their houses to prevent people falling (Deuteronomy 22:8).

== Firewall parapets ==
Many firewalls are required to have a parapet, a portion of the wall extending above the roof. The parapet is required to be as fire resistant as the lower wall, and extend a distance prescribed by building code.

== Bridge parapets ==
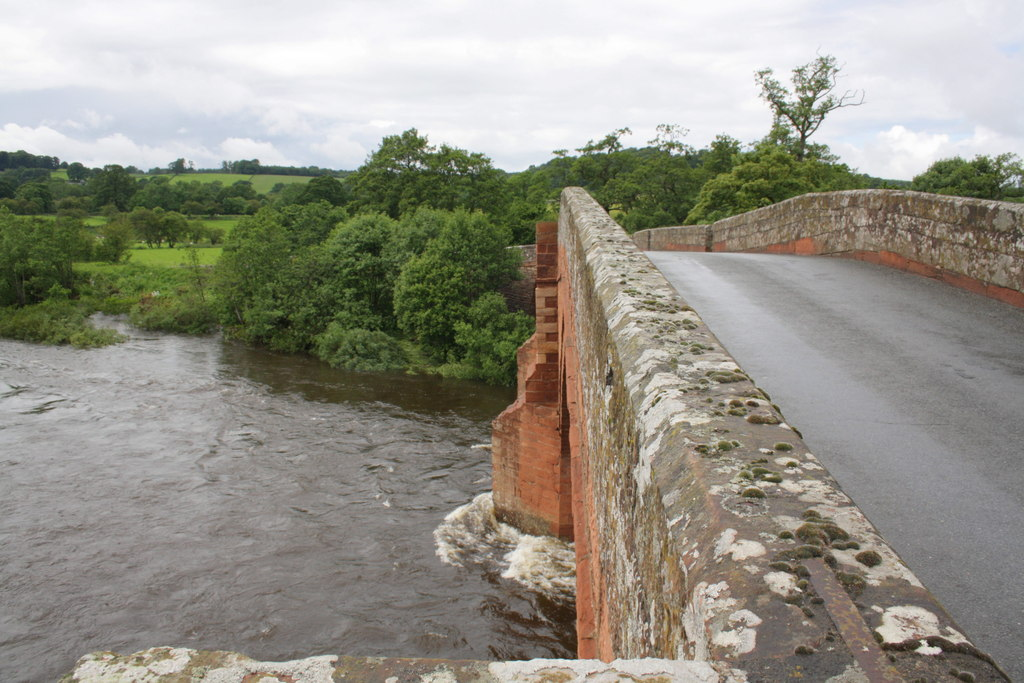
Stone bridge parapet

Parapets on bridges and other highway structures (such as retaining walls) prevent users from falling off where there is a drop. They may also be meant to restrict views, to prevent rubbish passing below, and to act as noise barriers.

Bridge parapets may be made from any material, but structural steel, aluminium, timber and reinforced concrete are common. They may be of solid or framed construction.

In European standards, parapets are defined as a sub-category of "vehicle restraint systems" or "pedestrian restraint systems".

== Parapets in fortification ==
Annotated sketch of an Italian battlement

A parapet fortification (known as a breastwork when temporary) is a wall of stone, wood or earth on the outer edge of a defensive wall or trench, which shelters the defenders. In medieval castles, they were often crenellated. In later artillery forts, parapets tend to be higher and thicker. They could be provided with embrasures for the fort's guns to fire through, and a banquette or fire-step so that defending infantry could shoot over the top. The top of the parapet often slopes towards the enemy to enable the defenders to shoot downwards; this incline is called the superior talus.

== See also ==
- Attic style
- Baluster
- Merlon
- Redoubt

== Bibliography ==
- Senani Ponnamperuma (2013). The Story of Sigiriya. Panique Pty Ltd. pp. 124–127, 179. ISBN 978-0987345141.
