= Pidurangala Vihara =

Buddhist temple in Sri Lanka

- පිදුරංගල විහාරය
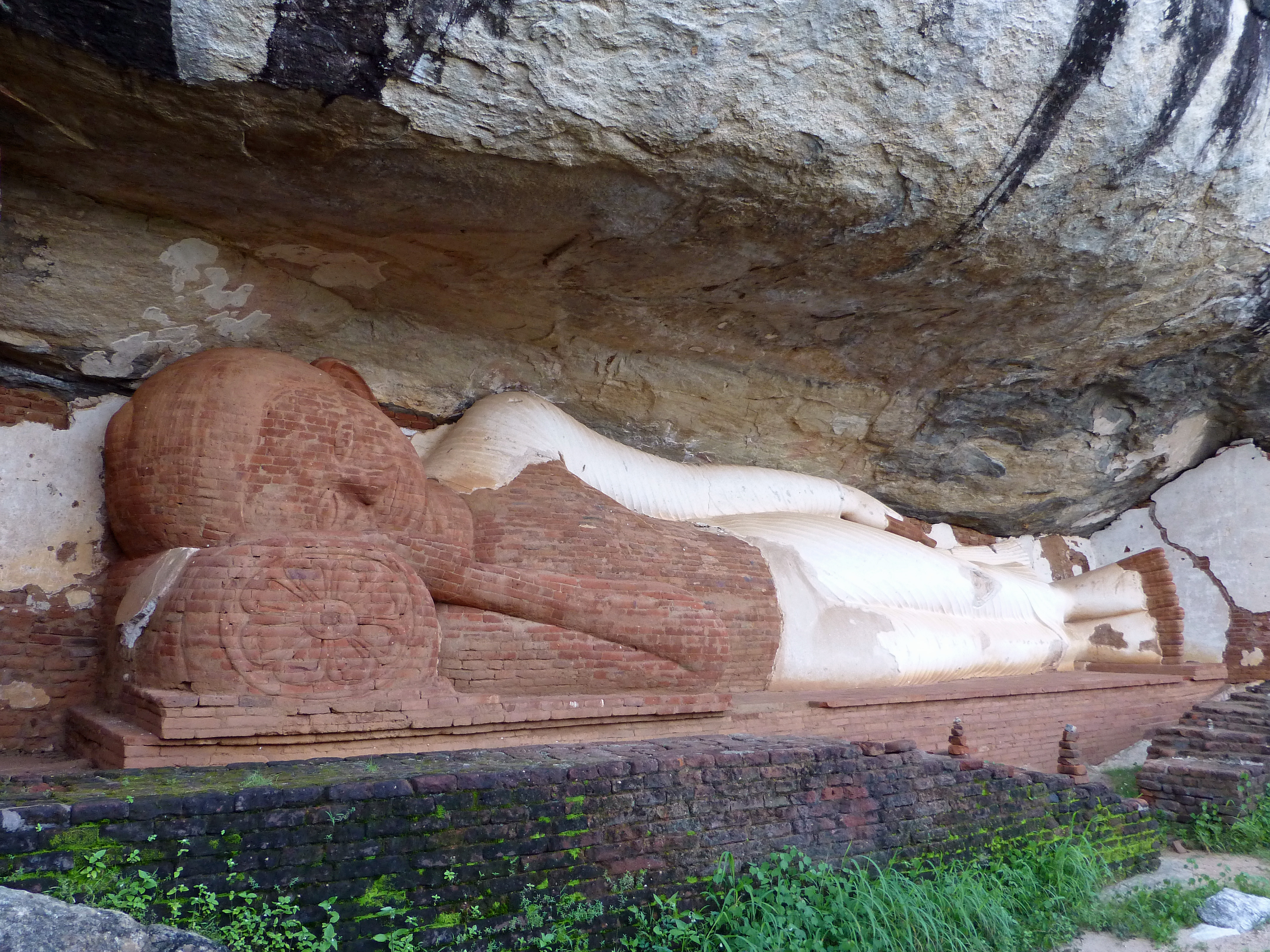

- Location within Sri Lanka

Religion
- Affiliation: Buddhism
- District: Matale
- Province: Central Province

Location
- Location: Pidurangala, Sri Lanka
- Coordinates: 07°57′57.0″N 80°45′44.7″E

Architecture
- Type: Buddhist temple
- Archaeological Protected Monument of Sri Lanka

Website
- www.sigiriyafortress.com

Pidurangala Vihara (Sinhala: පිදුරංගල විහාරය) is an ancient Buddhist temple situated on Pidurangala Rock in Matale District, Sri Lanka. The rock is located about 1 km north of the more visited Sigiriya rock.

== Etymology ==
It is said that the name Pidurangala was derived from the Sinhala words pidu + ran + goda. In English language it means "offered piles of gold".

== History ==
It is believed that the history of Pidurangala Vihara goes back beyond to the first century and second century BC. From those days Pidurangala was used as a Buddhist monastery but became a prominent place during the reign of King Kashyapa (473–495 AC).

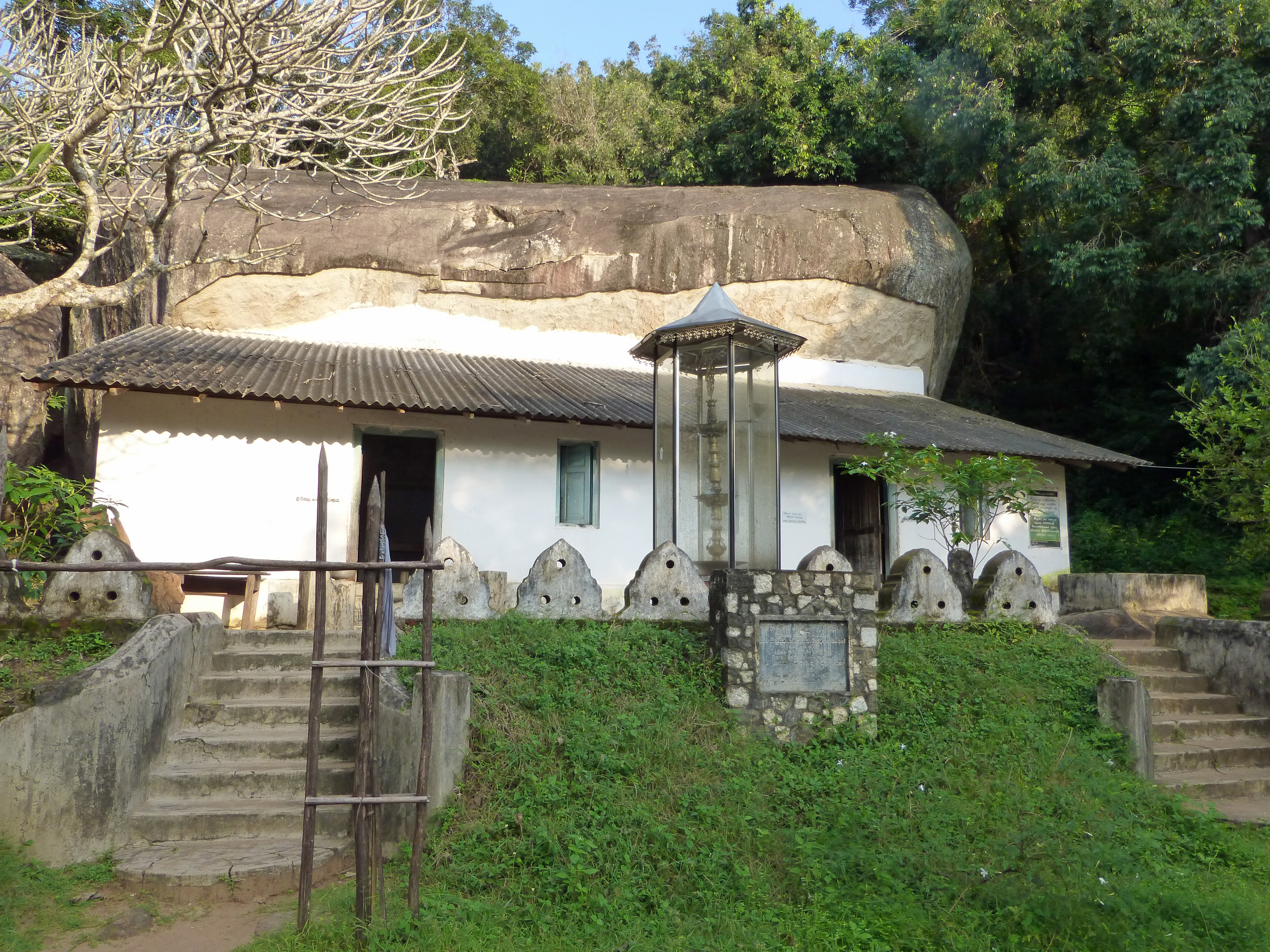
Pidurangala Temple

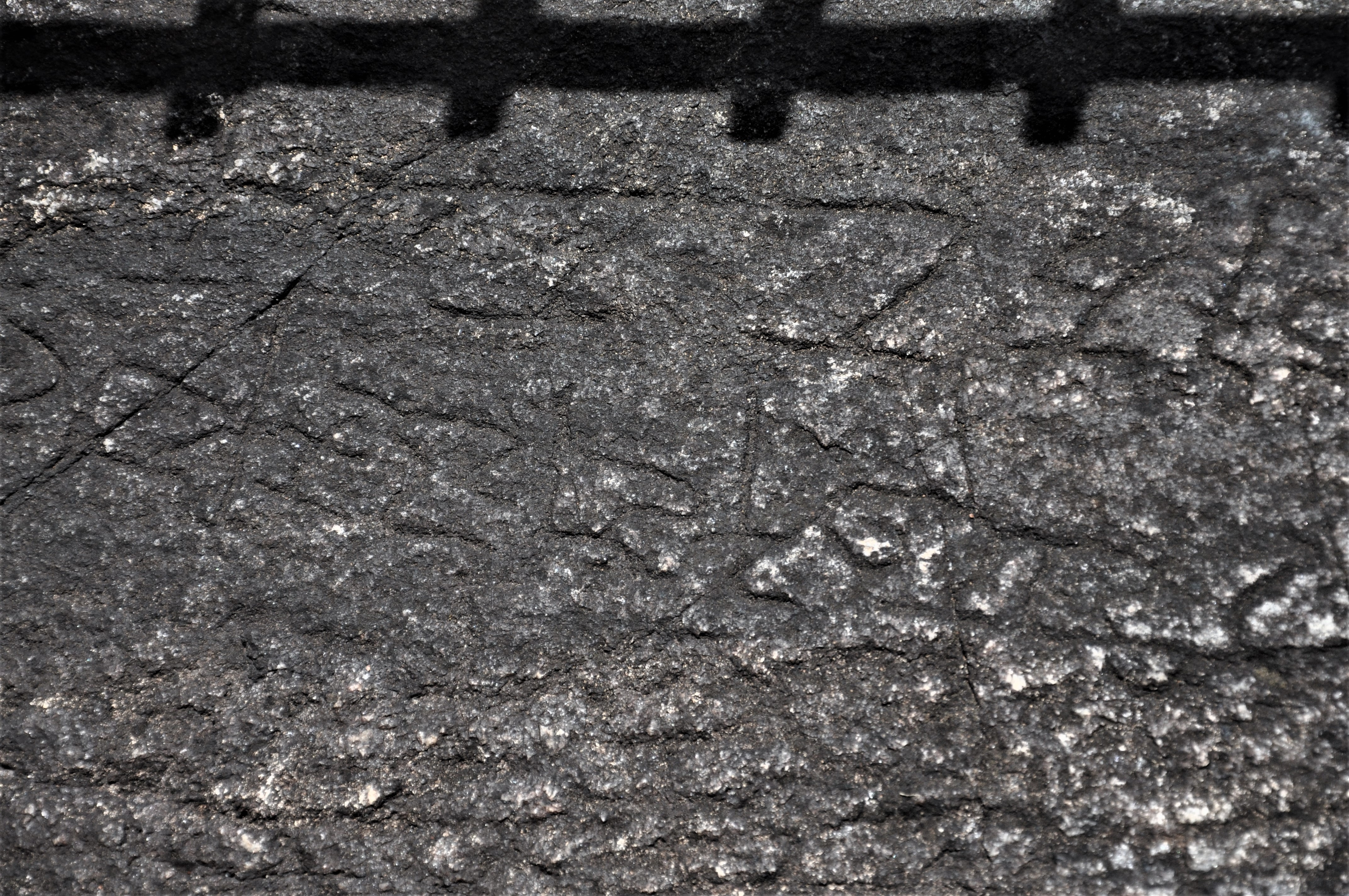
Inscriptions in early Brahmi script

According to ancient chronicles, Prince Kashyapa had killed his father King Dhatusena and fled to Sigiriya to find out a more secure place to prevent retaliation attacks from his half-brother, Mugalan. With the arrival of King Kashyapa, the Bhikkus who were meditated there were requested move to the nearby Pidurangala. In a sort of compensation, King Kashyapa refurbished the temple and made it a prominent place.

== The temple ==
The temple was said to be panchavasa, consisting of five main ritual buildings. Among the buildings are Ancient Stupa, Chapter House, Image House, Bodhighara, Preaching hall, Sangharama (Bikku Residence Building) and inscriptions with drip-ledged caves can be seen.

== See also ==
- List of Archaeological Protected Monuments in Matale District
