= John Still (author) =

British archaeologist and author (1880–1941)

- Born: 1880; Lambeth, England
- Died: September 9, 1941; Port Alfred, South Africa
- Occupations: Tea planter, archaeologist and author
- Known for: "The Jungle Tide"
- Spouse: Winifred Mary née Evans
- Children: Eileen Alice, John

John Still (1880–1941) was a British archaeologist and author, known for his discoveries at Sigiriya and his book "The Jungle Tide".

== Biography ==
Still was born in 1880 in Lambeth, England, the only son of Canon John Still (1845–1914) (Canon of Norwich, Rector of Hethersett, and Vicar of Ketteringham) and Anna Elizabeth, née Nihill (1853–1894). He was educated at Winchester College.

Still emigrated to British Ceylon in 1897, where he worked as a tea planter near Dickoya. In 1911 he was appointed as an assistant to Norman Rowsell of the Ceylon Labour Commission and he was also a Secretary of the Ceylon Planters Society. He also became an Archaeological Surveyor and Assistant Archaeological Commissioner (1 January 1902–31 December 1907) in the Department of Archaeology, under the supervision of H. C. P. Bell.

Still is associated with the discoveries at Sigiriya in which he played an active role. He also discovered the ruins of the Lotus Bath at Polonnaruwa. He wrote several works on the history of Sri Lanka including "Ancient Capitals of Ceylon", "Tantrimalai", and "Index to the Mahavamsa".

Still served as a second lieutenant in the 6th Battalion, East Yorkshire Regiment, which took part in the Suvla Bay Landing of the Gallipoli Campaign on 6 August 1915. He was captured by the Turkish forces on 9 August 1915 and spent three years and 84 days as a prisoner of war. His book “A Prisoner in Turkey”, published by The Bodley Head, was an account of his experiences as a prisoner in a Turkish prison camp. Whilst in captivity he wrote the book "Poems in Captivity", which was published by John Lane of London in 1919.

Still married Winifred Mary (known as Alice) née Evans and they had two children, Eileen Alice (1916–1992) and John (1919–1941).

Still's most well-known book is "The Jungle Tide" which was published in 1930 and was one of four textbooks prescribed for English literature in the Sri Lankan Senior School Certificate (English) Examination in the 1940s.

In 1939 Still moved to Rhodesia to live near his son. He remained in Africa for the rest of his life as a practising Buddhist. He suffered from diabetes and died in Port Alfred, South Africa on 9 September 1941.

== Bibliography ==
- Still, John (1907). Ancient Capitals of Ceylon: Historical Sketches & Guide. H. W. Cave & Co.
- Still, John (1907). Index to the Mahawansa: Together with Chronological Table of Wars and Genealogical Trees. Colombo: H. C. Cottle - Government Printer.
- Still, John (1910). "The Journal of the Ceylon Branch of the Royal Asiatic Society of Great Britain & Ireland". Tantrimalai: Some Archaeological Observations and Deductions. 22 (63). Colombo: Royal Asiatic Society of Sri Lanka: 73–101.
- Still, John (1919). Poems in Captivity. London: John Lane & Co.
- Still, John (1920). A Prisoner in Turkey. London: The Bodley Head/John Lane & Co.
- Still, John (1930). The Jungle Tide. London: W. Blackwood & Sons Limited.

== See also ==
- Tea production in Sri Lanka
- Norman Rowsell
- History of Sri Lanka
