= Rowsell =

Rowsell is a surname. Notable people with the surname include:

- Erick Rowsell (born 1990), British road racing cyclist
- Edmund Penning-Rowsell (1913–2002), British journalist
- Harry Rowsell (1921-2006), Canadian veterinarian, pathologist, animal welfare advocate and humanist
- Joanna Rowsell Shand (born 1988), British cyclist
- Leslie Rowsell Moore (1912-2003), Professor of Geology, described as "one of the founders of modern Carboniferous palynology"
- Norman Rowsell (1855-1919), Tea planter and first Ceylon Labour Commissioner
- Spud Rowsell (21st century), English sailboat racer
- Thomas James Rowsell (1816–1894), Canon of Westminster
- Ellie Rowsell (born 1992), British singer and guitarist of the band Wolf Alice.

== See also ==
- The Rowsell-Julyan-Keenan Commission, a Royal Commission in 1878 that recommended in its report the Anglicisation of the educational and judicial systems of Malta.
- Dubuis & Rowsell, manufacturer of Rola Cola
- Penning-Rowsell
- Roswell (disambiguation)
