= Cecil Ralph Townshend Congreve =

English Planter from South India

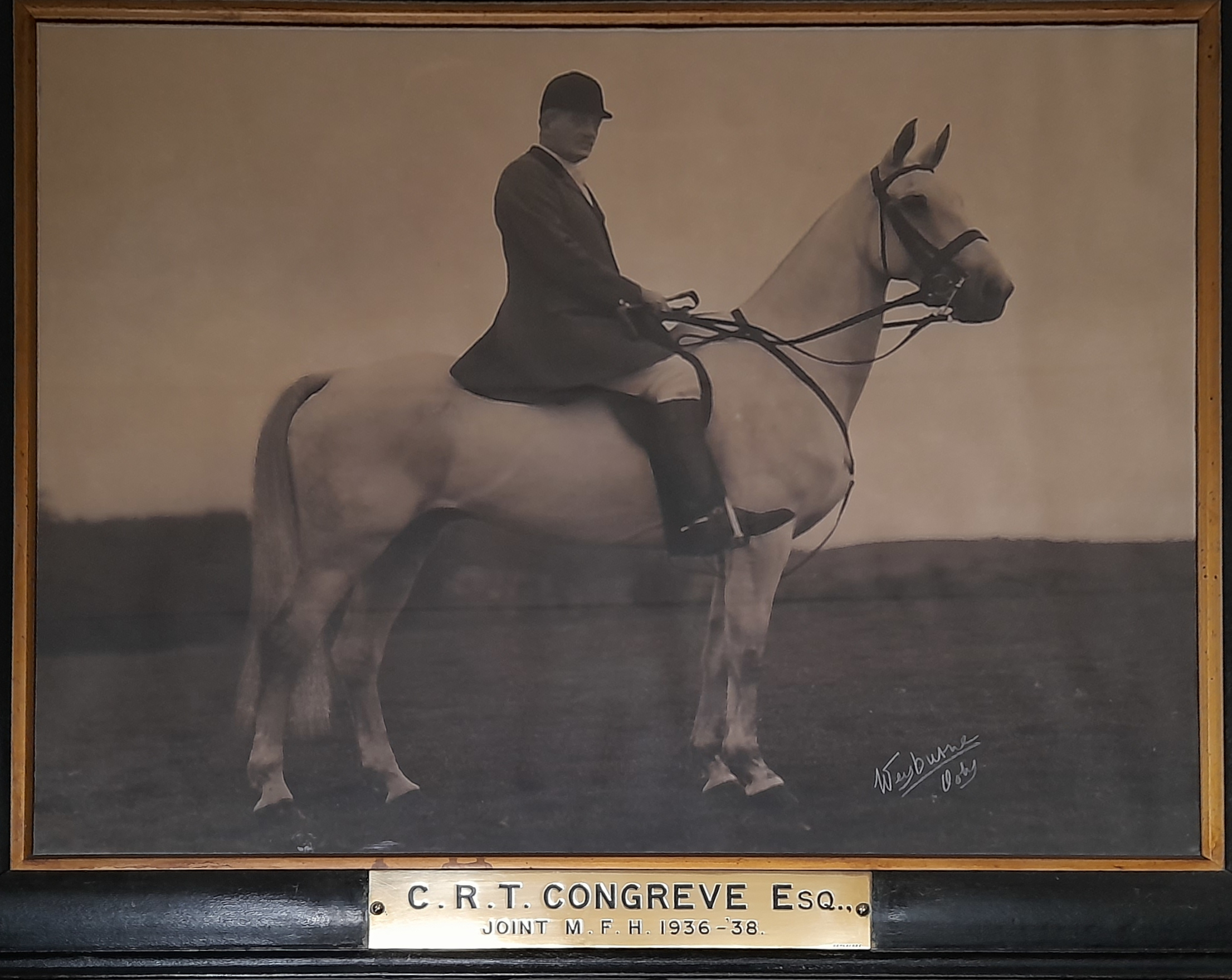
- Portrait photo from the Ootacamund club
- Born: 17 September 1876; Stafford, Staffordshire, England
- Died: 3 June 1952 (aged 75); Ruthin Castle, Denbighshire, Wales
- Spouses: Esme Maud Rowsell; Margaret Louis Wilson Somerville
- Parents: William Congreve (father); Fanny Emma Townshend (mother)
- Relatives: Walter Congreve (brother), Norman Rowsell (father-in-law)

Cecil Ralph Townshend Congreve CBE (17 September 1876 – 3 June 1952), more often referred to as C.R.T. Congreve, was among the earliest English tea planters in the Anamalai Hills of southern India.

== Life and work ==
Congreve was born in Stafford, Staffordshire, the son of William Congreve (1831-1902), of Congreve and Burton, D.L. for Staffordshire, and Fanny Emma Townshend, second daughter of Lee Porcher Townshend, of Wincham Hall, co. Chester. One of nine siblings, his eldest brother was Sir General Walter Norris Congreve, V.C.

Congreve was educated at Charterhouse School, Godalming, 1891–93, and at the Royal Agricultural College, Cirencester. He went out to India in 1896 and was trained briefly under E.G. Windle, a prominent planter from The Nilgiris. Later he joined G. A. Carver Marsh who was one of the early explorers of Anaimalai Hills in Southern Western Ghats and instrumental in opening up this region for tea and coffee plantation. Congreve moved to the Anamallais in March 1897 to help Carver Marsh in establishing tea plantations.

Congreve married Esme Maud Rowsell on 28 February 1911. They had three sons and lived in Blair Atholl, Coonoor. After a divorce he married Margaret 'Ann' Louis Wilson Somerville on 20 May 1933. They had a daughter named Julia in 1934.

Congreve was an honorary secretary of Anamallai Planters' Association from 1907 to 1909. He was a member of the Madras Legislative Council during 1922-25 and 1926–29. He was chairman during 1920-21 and 1930-32 of The United Planters' Association of Southern India (UPASI) and served as its president in 1937–38.

Congreve was a member of the Ooty hunt club and the Joint Master of the Ooty Hunt 1936 – 1938. He was appointed CBE in 1941. He retired as a planter from Valparai in 1945. He wrote The Anamallais, published in 1941 about his experiences in the Anamalai hills.

He died on 3 June 1952, in the Ruthin Castle Clinic, Denbighshire, Wales, when he was 75 years old.
