= Mapagala fortress =

- Part of Matale District
- Sigiriya, Sri Lanka

Site information
- Type: Defence fort
- Condition: Remnant

Location
- Sri Lanka
- Coordinates: 7.951248°N 80.757718°E

Site history
- Built by: Anuradhapura Kingdom

Mapagala fortress was an ancient fortified complex of the Anuradhapura Kingdom long before Kasyapa I built his city, Sigiriya. It is located to the South of Sigiriya and closer to Sigiriya tank.

It was built by using unshaped boulders to about 20 ft high. Each stone is broad and thick and some of them are about 10 ft high and about 4 ft wide. It is believed that it was built before the time of usage of metal tools. Arthur Maurice Hocart noted that cyclopean style stone walls were used for the fortress, and square hammered stones were used for the ramparts of the citadel. However, his note suggests metal (iron) tools were used for construction. Excavations work in this areas found a few stone forges, which proved Hocart's claim on the usage of metal tools.
