= Christ Church Warleigh, Dickoya =

Church in Dickoya, Sri Lanka

Coordinates: 6°51′47.7″N 80°35′43.0″E

Christ Church Warleigh
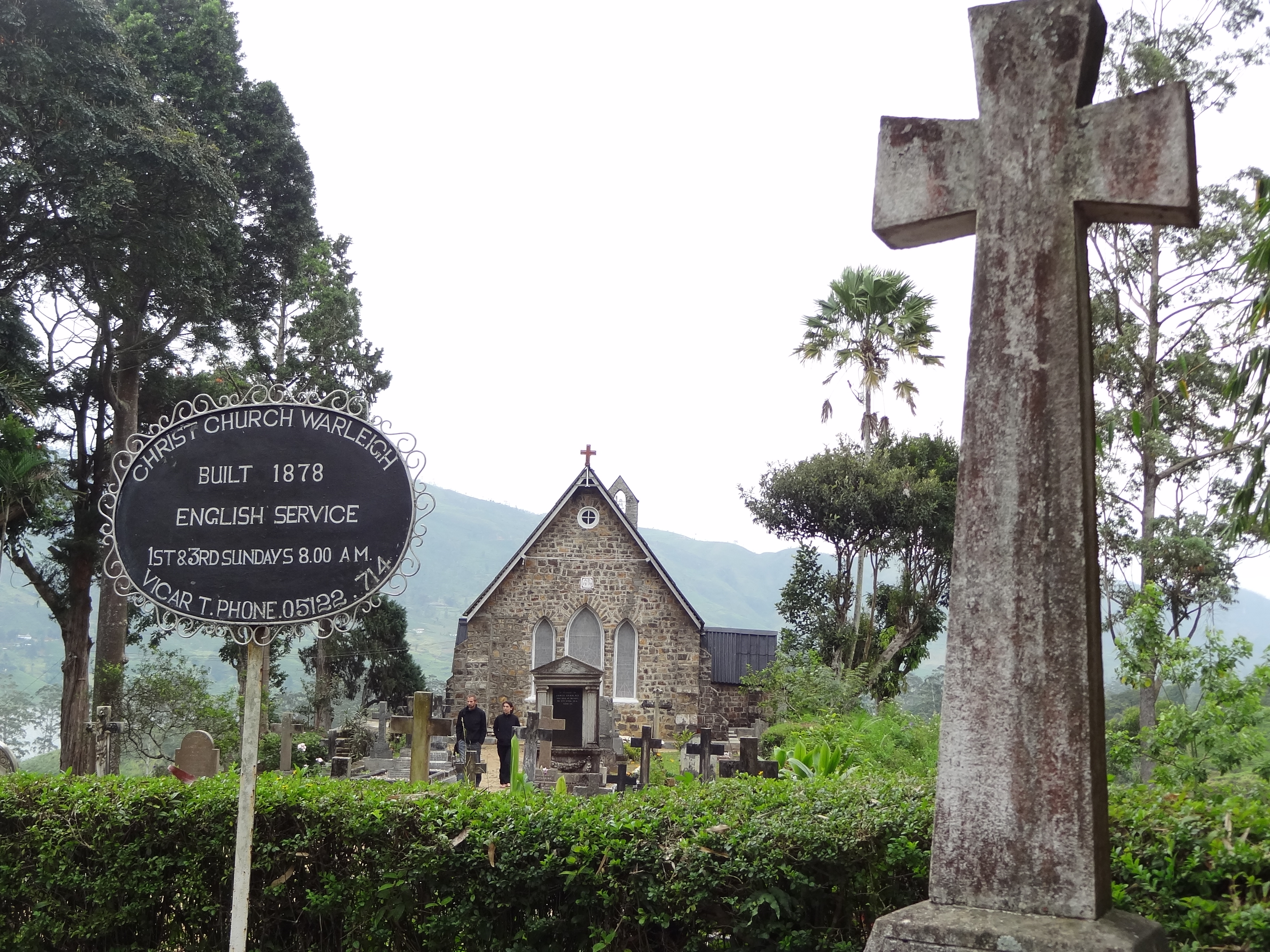
- Christ Church Warleigh
- Location: Dickoya
- Country: Sri Lanka
- Denomination: Anglican church (Church of Ceylon)

History
- Founded: 1878; 148 years ago
- Founder: William Scott

Architecture
- Functional status: Active

Christ Church Warleigh is an Anglican church in Sri Lanka built during the 19th century by the British. It is administered by the Church of Ceylon. The church is regarded as one of the most prominent and oldest Anglican churches in Sri Lanka and is a tourist destination. It is in the Central Province of Sri Lanka, in Dickoya, near the Nuwara Eliya District along the Hatton-Norwood road through the Warleigh Division. The church borders tea estates and the Castlereagh Reservoir.

== History ==
Christ Church was built by the William Scott, the manager of the Governor's Mansion, in 1878, when the country was a British colony. A bible printed in 1860s was presented to the church in July 1879 by Rev. Charles Hill, the rector of Warboys Parish, and is still preserved in the church. The first British colonial Inspector General of the Ceylon Police, Sir George William Robert Campbell who came to Ceylon in 1866 is believed to be buried in the churchyard.

== Architecture ==
The church was built in typical old British church architecture. The walls of the church include granite stones. The church interior has wooden furniture seats, an ancient pipe organ (piano), an armchair, and wooden pulpit along with a 140 year old Bible.

19th century stained glass windows, which depict paintings of Jesus Christ, were originally brought from England. A baptismal font made of porcelain is adorned with floral designs. The church floor is laid out with imported floral tiles from England.

A cemetery with tombstones of English colonial tea planters is next to the church.
