= Norman Rowsell =

Ceylonese tea planter and sportsman (1855–1919)

- Born: Norman Rowsell; July 1855; Lambeth, England
- Died: 14 April 1919 (aged 63); Coonoor, Tamil Nadu, India
- Occupations: Tea planter and first Ceylon Labour Commissioner
- Known for: Early tea plantation in British Ceylon
- Spouse: Florence Henrietta née Congreve (1857-1942)
- Children: Vere Norman (1887-1945), Maud Esme (1891-1974?), Marion Kathleen (1896-1990)
- Relatives: Cecil Ralph Townshend Congreve (son in law)

Norman Rowsell (July 1855 – 14 April 1919) was an Englishman who was one of the first tea planters in British Ceylon. He was also a well known sportsman and became the first Ceylon Labour Commissioner.

== Biography ==
Norman Rowsell was born in Lambeth, England in July 1855, the son of Benjamin Rowsell (1820-1886) and Sarah née Norman (1821-1903).

Rowsell received his education at Queen Elizabeth's Grammar School, Faversham. In 1880, at the age of 25, he left England and travelled to Ceylon, where he settled near Dickoya and managed the Abbotsleigh Estate, which was owned by C. J. Braine, until 1904. In 1883 19 acres (7.7 ha) at Abbotsleigh were used for the new crop, tea, while 209 acres (85 ha) were used for coffee and cinnamon. Norman was simultaneously managing an estate called Florence for J. M. Robertson and Co and had previously managed an estate in Battalgalla.

Norman married Florence Henrietta Congreve and they had three children in Ceylon. Their second child Maud Esme married her second cousin Cecil Ralph Townshend Congreve at Coimbatore in 1911. In 1904 the Planter's Association of Ceylon established a Coast Agency called the Ceylon Labour Commission at Tiruchirappalli (formerly Trichinopoly) in India. Norman was the first to manage the office, the objective of which was to assist the immigration of Tamil labourers for the Ceylon tea plantations. When the Commission was started, it was funded in part by the Government of Ceylon, as well as by planters, but later the plantation owners took over all costs. Norman was assisted by a number of Indian and European aides in his duties, one of whom, appointed in 1911, was John Still, the author of Jungle Tide.

Rowsell died in 1919 at Coonoor, India of kidney disease. He had been visiting his daughter, Esme, and son in law at their home, Blair Atholl, which is now a hotel, Wallwood garden.

== Sporting career ==
Norman was a renowned sportsman and his obituary in The Straits Times (22 May 1919) described him as “one of the best known Ceylon planters and sportsmen of his day.” By 1883 Norman was the Honorary secretary and treasurer of the Dickoya Maskeliya Cricket Club. Norman’s younger brother Eustace, who was also a planter in Ceylon, had been on the Blackheath F.C. squad in 1891 and Norman was the Captain of Ceylon’s Up-Country XV rugby team in 1892. Norman was also a competent tennis player, competing in the 1889 Men’s singles of the Ceylon Championships at Nuwara Eliya.

== See also ==
- Ceylon tea
- Thomas Lipton
- Tea production in Sri Lanka
- James Taylor (tea planter)
