= Pidurangala Rock =

Buddhist site in Sri Lanka

Pidurangala Rock is a rocky outcrop located in central Sri Lanka, in the Matale District, about 1 km (0.6 mi) north of the more well-known Sigiriya rock.

== Geology ==
These bare peaks rise abruptly from the low-lying plains that extend from the central mountain range of the country. They are inselbergs, hardened granite outcrops deriving from solidified magma plugs of former volcanoes.

== History ==
The rocks form the site of Pidurangala Vihara, a former Buddhist monastery, which is a registered archaeological protected site. Caves house a temple, Sigiri Pidurangala Raja Maha Viharaya, which is believed to have been built by King Kashyapa in the 5th century, and a monumental brick statue of a reclining Buddha. King Kashyapa's stupa is near the entrance to the monastery, and there are remains of another stupa on the top of the outcrop.

== Gallery ==
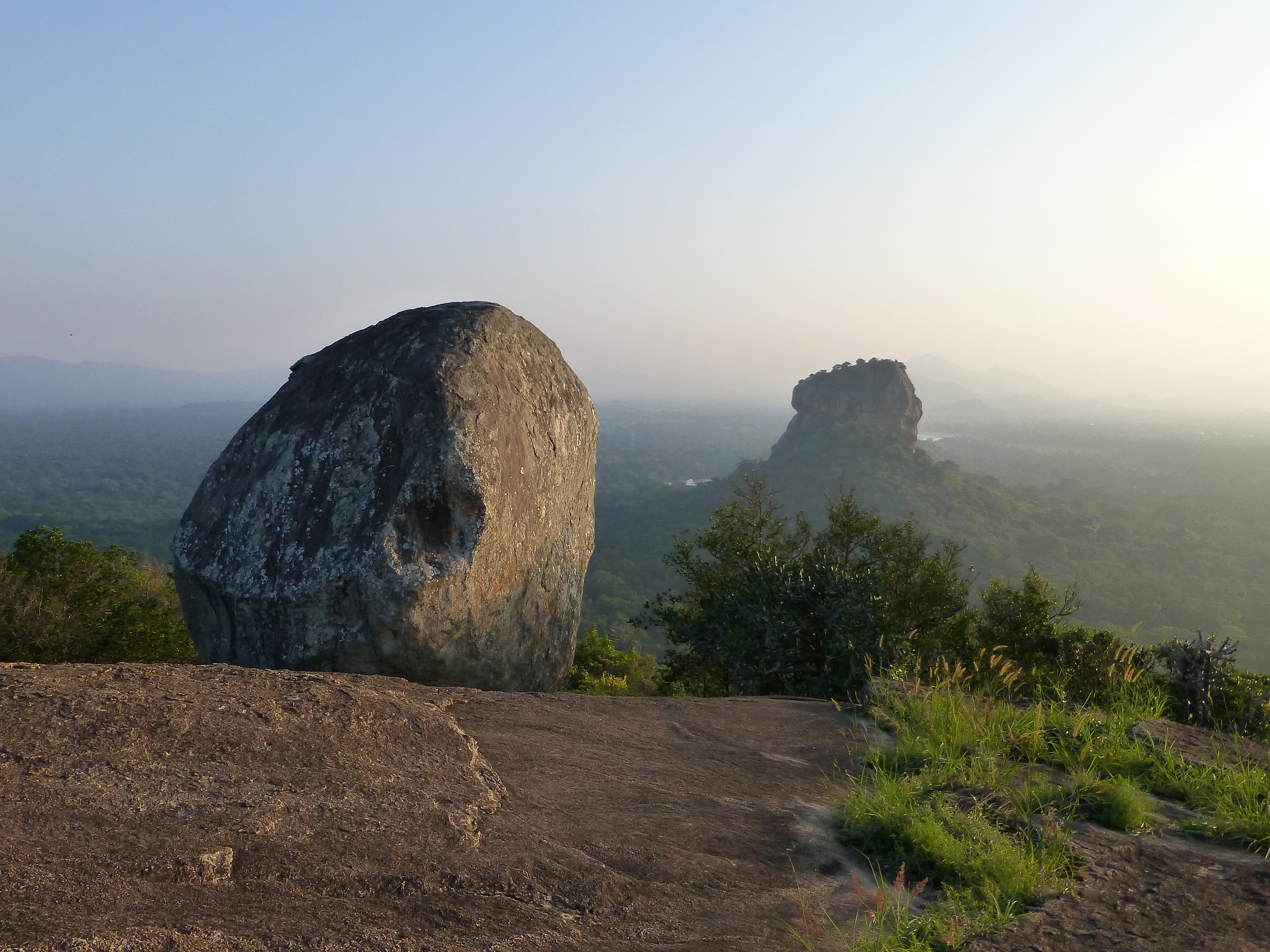
Sigiriya Rock seen from Pidurangala

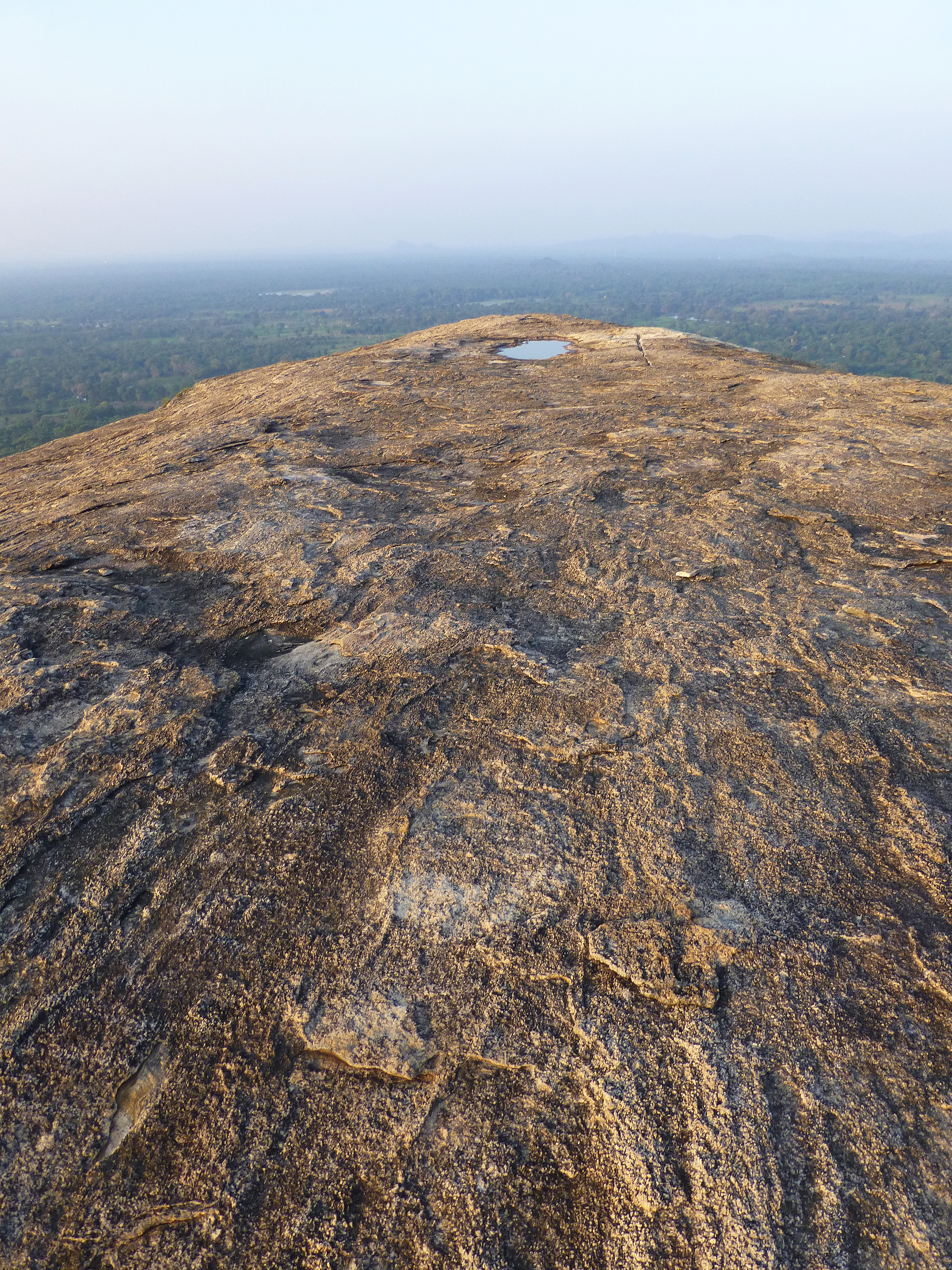
Summit and panorama

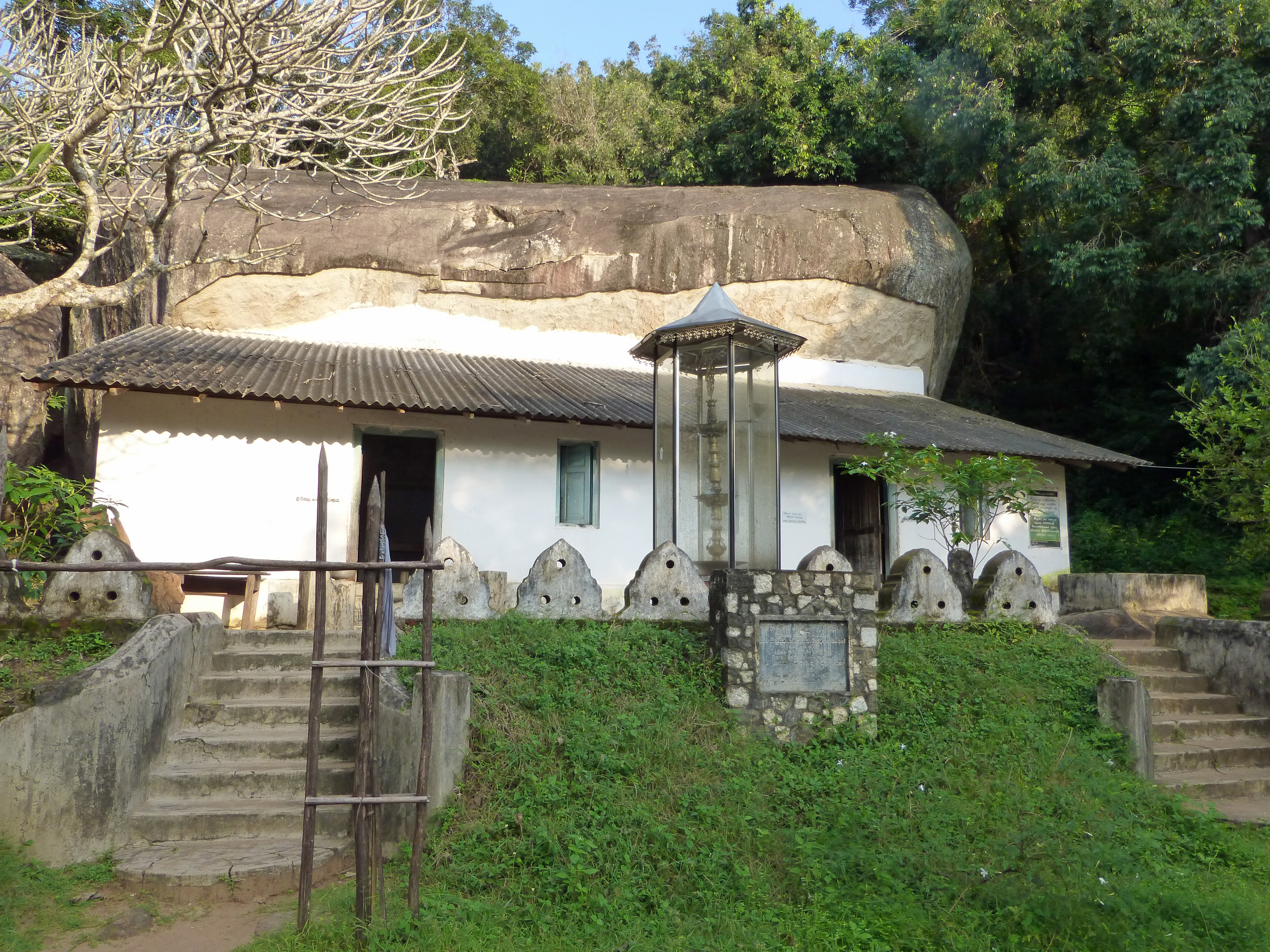
Entrance to the temple at the foot of the rock

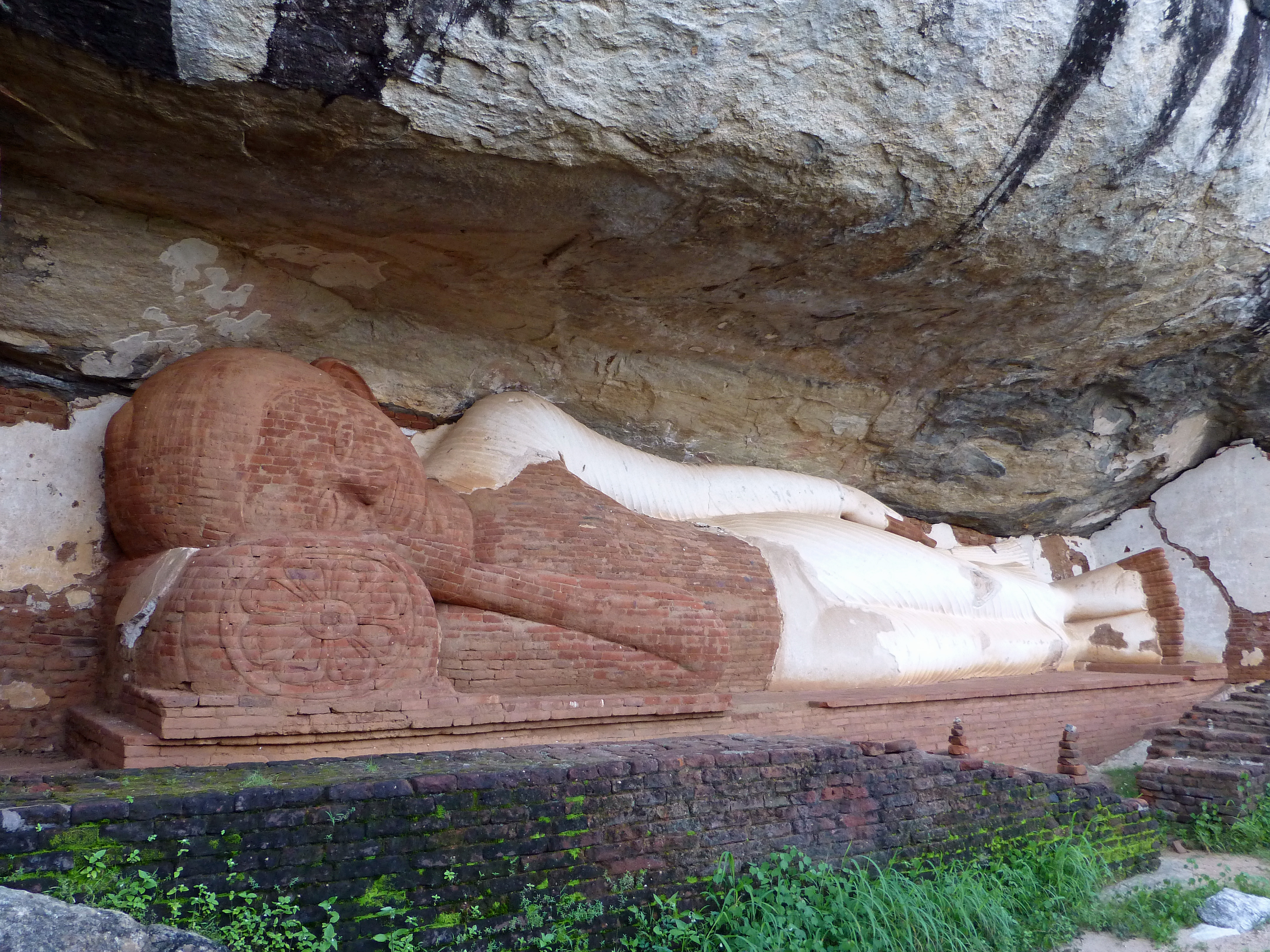
Brick statue of a reclining Buddha

== Bibliography ==
- Senake Bandaranayake and Mats Mogren (Ed.), Further studies in the settlement archaeology of the Sigiriya-Dambulla region, University of Kelaniya, Postgraduate Institute of Archaeology, 1994, 349 p. ISBN 955-904419-2 (numerous references to Pidurangala)
- Klaus Kilian and Hans-Joachim Weishaar, Excavations at Pidurangala (Sri Lanka): The Upper Rock Shelter, Philipp von Zabern, Mainz am Rhein, 1994, 125 p.
