= Sigiriya =

Ancient rock fortress near Dambulla, Sri Lanka

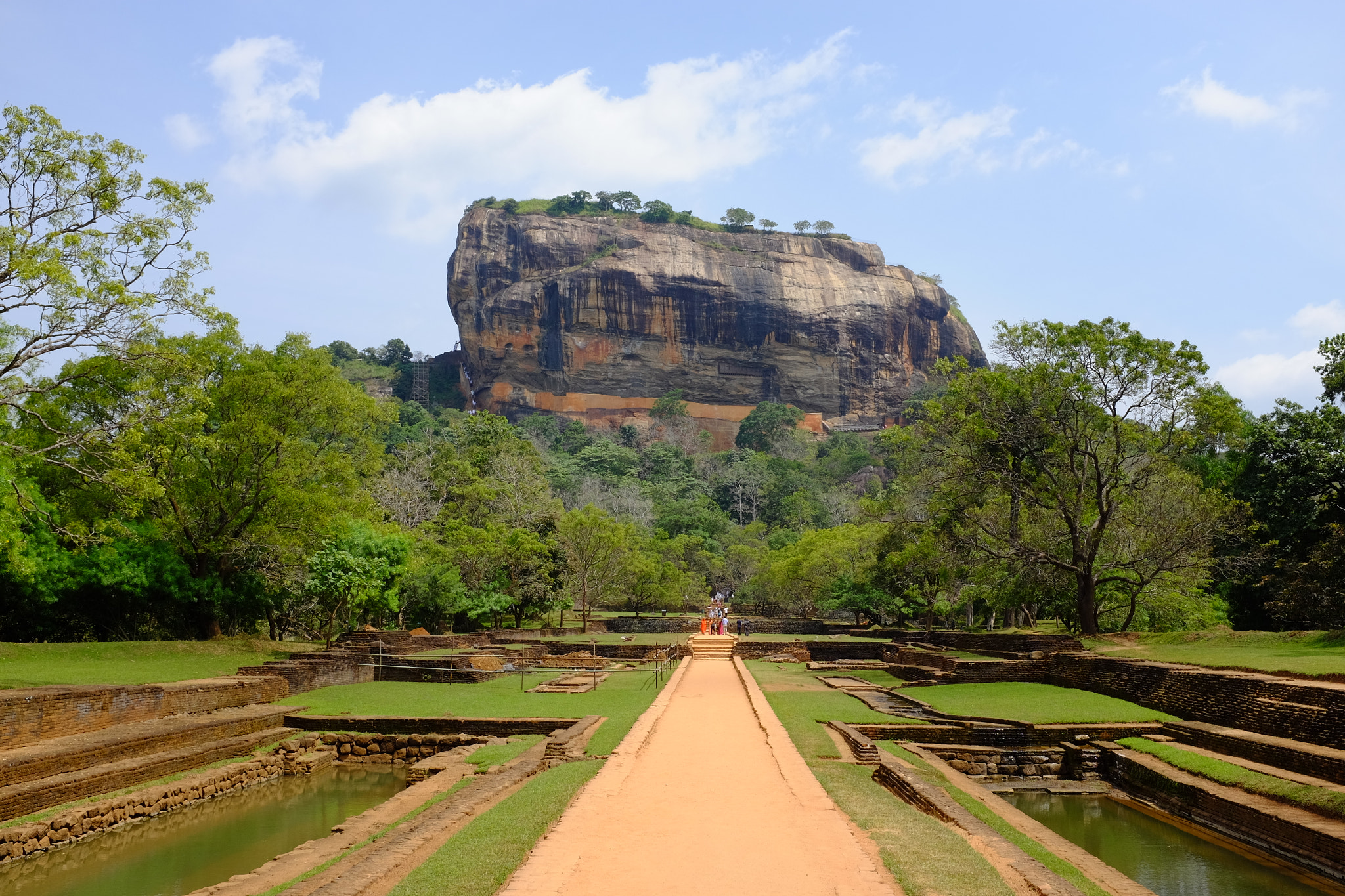
- Sigiriya ancient rock

- Location within Sri Lanka
- 07°57′25″N 80°45′35″E
- Location: Central Province, Sri Lanka

History
- Built for: King Kashyapa of Sri Lanka

Site notes
- Elevation: 349 m (1,145 ft)
- Governing body: Government of Sri Lanka
- Visitors: 1 million
- Website: www.sigiriyafortress.com

UNESCO World Heritage Site
- Official name: Ancient City of Sigiriya
- Type: Cultural
- Criteria: ii, iii, iv
- Designated: 1982 (6th session)
- Reference no.: 202
- UNESCO Region: Asia-Pacific

Archaeological Protected Monument of Sri Lanka

Sigiriya or Sinhagiri (Lion Rock Sinhala: සීගිරිය, Tamil: சிகிரியா/சிங்ககிரி, /ˈsiːɡɪrɪjə/) is an ancient rock fortress located in the northern Matale District near the town of Dambulla in the Central Province, Sri Lanka. It is a site of historical and archaeological significance that is dominated by a massive column of granite approximately 180 m (590 ft) high.

According to the ancient Sri Lankan chronicle the Cūḷavaṃsa, this area was a large forest, then after storms and landslides it became a hill and was selected by King Kashyapa (CE 477–495) for his new capital. He built his palace on top of this rock and decorated its sides with colourful frescoes. On a small plateau about halfway up the side of this rock he built a gateway in the form of an enormous lion. The name of this place is derived from this structure; Sinhagiri, the Lion Rock.

The capital and the royal palace were abandoned after the king's death. It was used as a Buddhist monastery until the 14th century. Sigiriya today is a UNESCO listed World Heritage Site. It is one of the best preserved examples of ancient urban planning.

== Geology ==
Sigiriya rock rises abruptly from the low-lying plains that extend from the central mountain range of Sri Lanka. It is an inselberg, a hardened granite outcrop deriving from a solidified magma plug of a former volcano.

Pidurangala Rock, 1 km to the north, has a similar origin.

== History ==
It is likely that the area around Sigiriya was inhabited since prehistoric times. There is clear evidence from Brahmi inscriptions on the western side of Sigiriya that the many rock shelters and caves in the vicinity were occupied by Buddhist monks and ascetics from as early as the 1st or 2nd century BCE. The earliest evidence of human habitation at Sigiriya is the Aligala rock shelter to the east of Sigiriya rock, indicating that the area was occupied circa 3000 BCE during the Mesolithic Period.

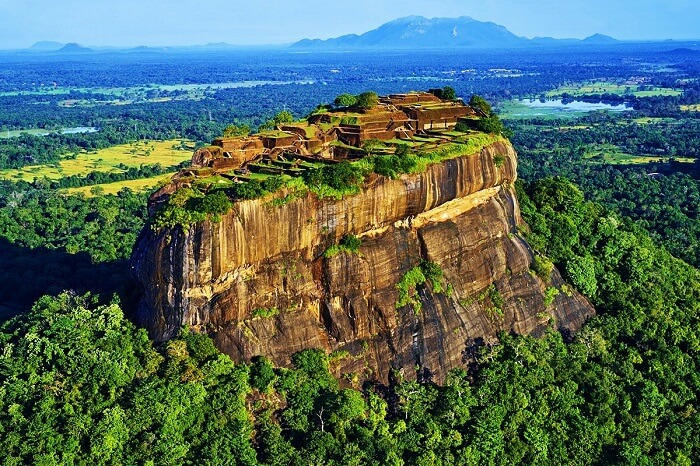
Aerial view of Sigiriya Rock

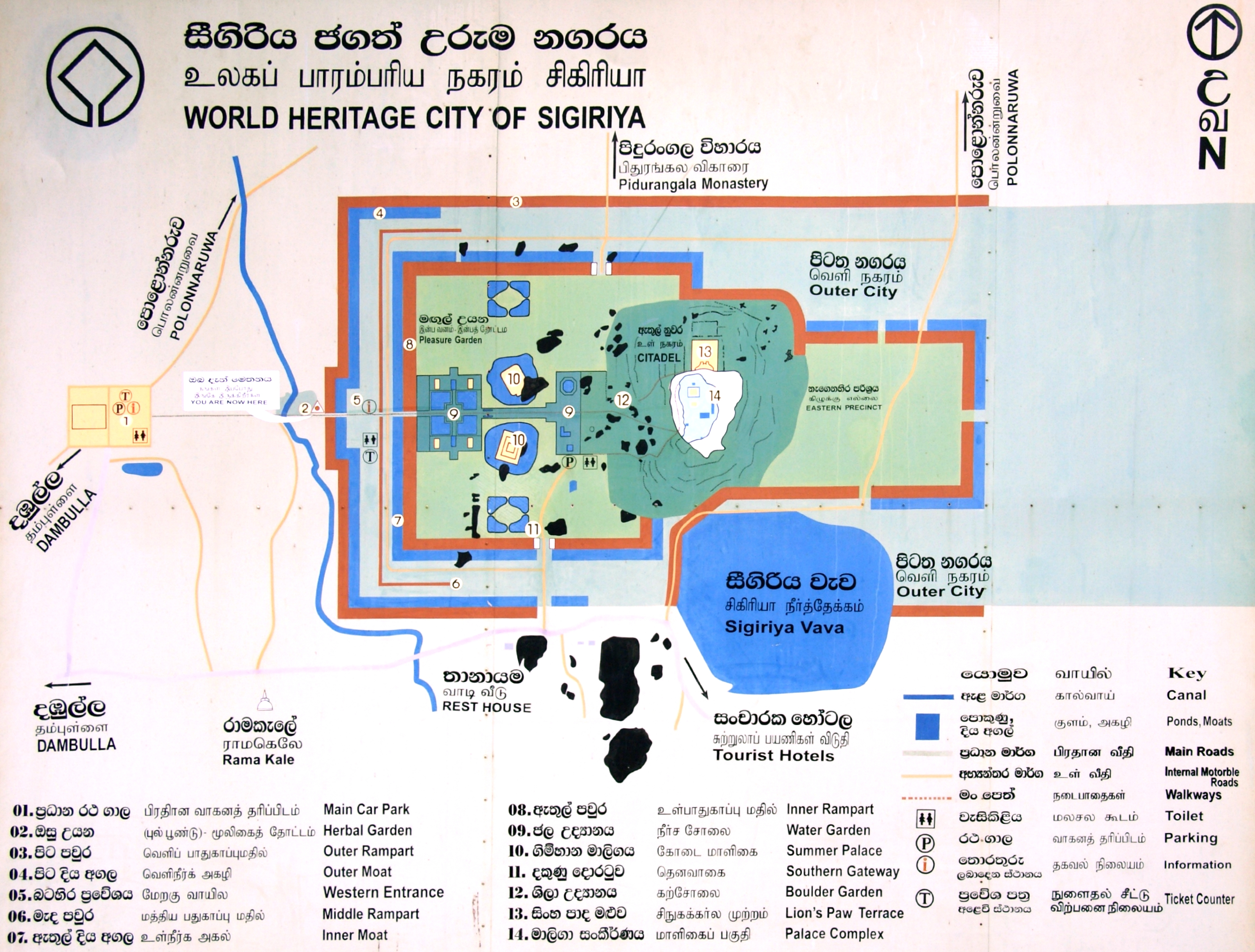
Map of Sigirya archaeological site.

Buddhist monastic settlements were established during the 3rd century BCE in the western and northern slopes of the boulder-strewn hills surrounding the Sigiriya rock. Several rock shelters or caves were created during this period. These shelters were made under large boulders, with carved drip ledges around the cave mouths. Rock inscriptions are carved near the drip ledges on many of the shelters, recording the donation of the shelters to the Buddhist monastic order as residences. These were made in the period between the 3rd century BCE and the 1st century CE.

The Cūḷavaṃsa describes that in 477 CE, Kashyapa I, the son of King Dhatusena by a non-royal consort, seized the throne in a coup assisted by Migara, the King's nephew and army commander. He murdered his father by walling him up alive and then usurped the throne which rightfully belonged to his half-brother Moggallana who, fearing for his life, fled to South India, but vowed revenge.

Expecting the inevitable return of Moggallana, Kashyapa moved the capital and his residence from the traditional capital of Anuradhapura to the more secure summit of Sigiriya. During King Kashyapa's reign (477–495 CE), Sigiriya was developed into a complex city and fortress. Most of the elaborate constructions on the rock summit and around it, including defensive structures, palaces, and gardens, date from this period.

When Moggallana finally arrived, he declared war, and defeated Kashyapa in 495 CE. During the battle Kashyapa's armies abandoned him and he committed suicide by falling on his sword.

The Cūḷavaṃsa and folklore inform us that the war elephant on which Kashyapa was mounted changed course to take a strategic advantage, but the army misinterpreted the movement as the king's having opted to retreat, prompting the army to abandon him altogether. It is said that being too proud to surrender he took his dagger from his waistband, cut his throat, raised the dagger proudly, sheathed it, and fell dead. Moggallana returned the capital to Anuradhapura, converting Sigiriya into a Buddhist monastery complex, which survived until the 13th or 14th century. After this period, no records are found on Sigiriya until the 16th and 17th centuries, when it was used briefly as an outpost of the Kingdom of Kandy.

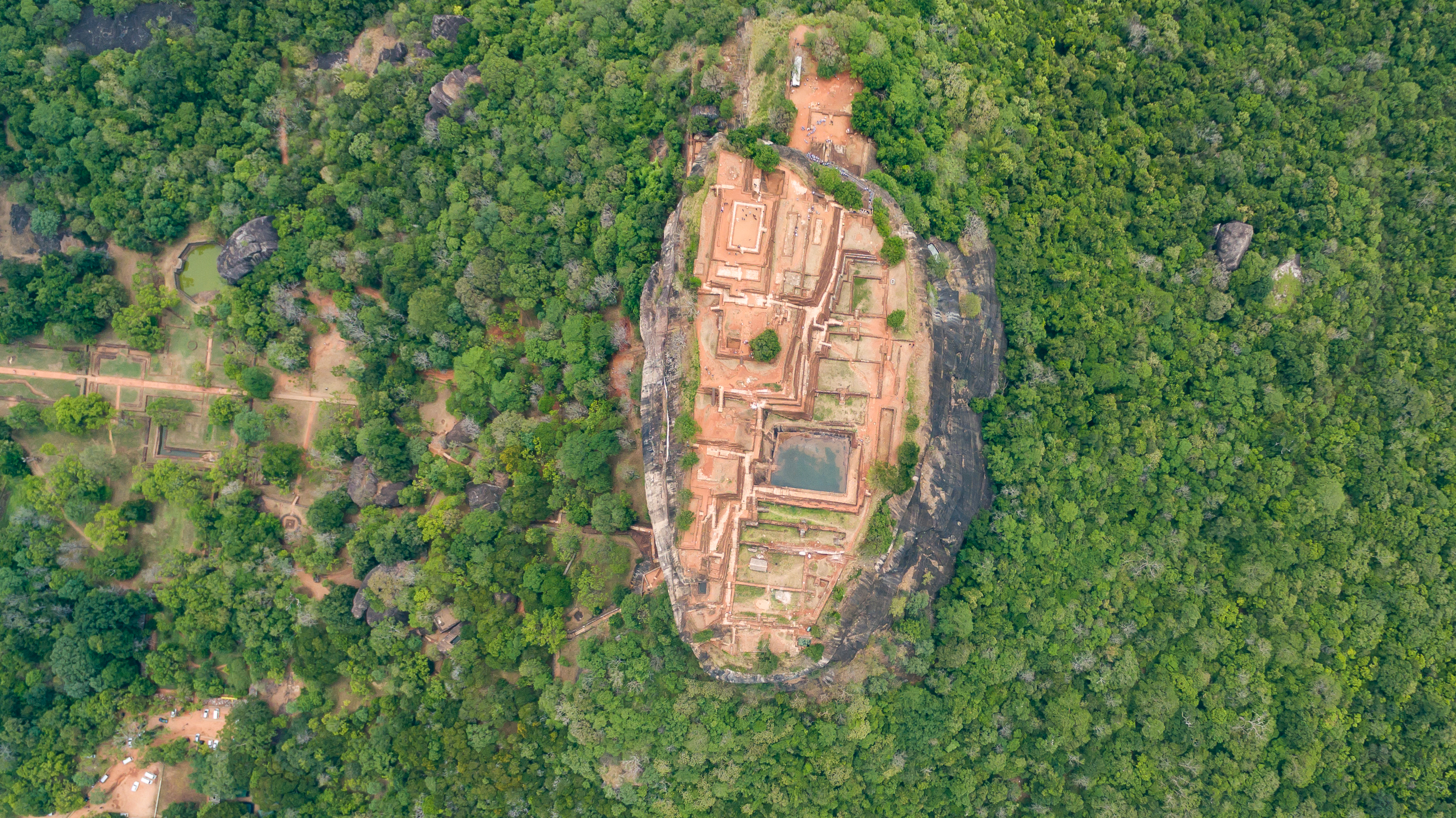
Sigiriya Rock from above

Alternative stories have the primary builder of Sigiriya as King Dhatusena, with Kashyapa finishing the work in honour of his father. Still other stories describe Kashyapa as a playboy king, with Sigiriya his pleasure palace. Even Kashyapa's eventual fate is uncertain. In some versions he is assassinated by poison administered by a concubine; in others he cuts his own throat when deserted in his final battle. Still further interpretations regard the site as the work of a Buddhist community, without a military function. This site may have been important in the competition between the Mahayana and Theravada Buddhist traditions in ancient Sri Lanka.

== Archaeological remains and features ==
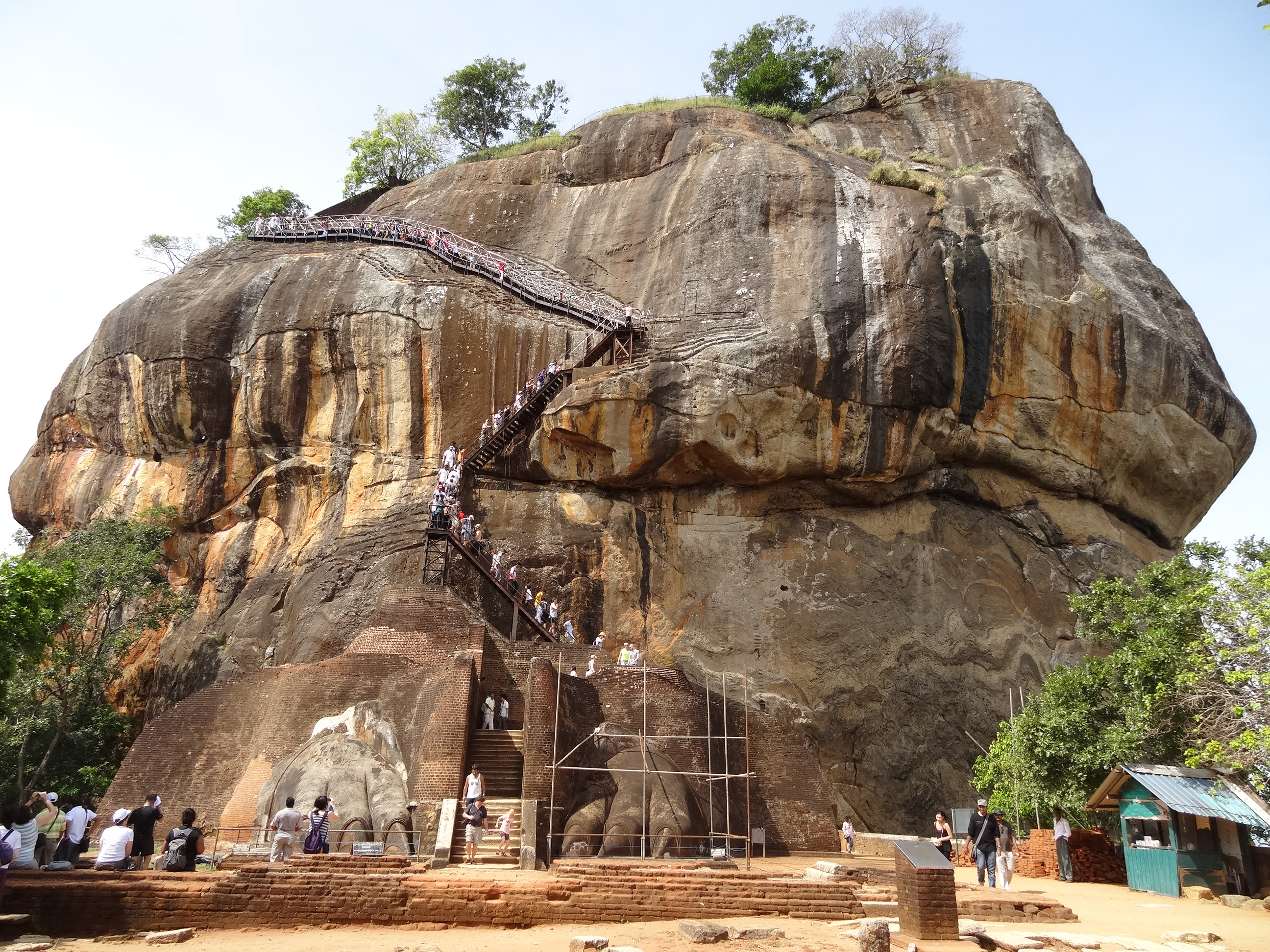
The Lion Gate and Climbing Stretch

In 1831 Major Jonathan Forbes of the 78th (Highlanders) Regiment of Foot of the British Army, while returning on horseback from a trip to Pollonnuruwa, encountered the "brushwood-covered summit of the rock of Sigiri". Sigiriya came to the attention of antiquarians and, later, archaeologists. Archaeological work at Sigiriya began on a small scale in the 1890s. H.C.P. Bell was the first archaeologist to conduct extensive research on Sigiriya. The Cultural Triangle Project, launched by the Government of Sri Lanka, focused its attention on Sigiriya in 1982. Archaeological work began on the entire city for the first time under this project. There was a sculpted lion's head above the legs and paws flanking the entrance, but the head collapsed years ago.

Sigiriya consists of an ancient citadel built by King Kashyapa during the 5th century. The Sigiriya site contains the ruins of an upper palace located on the flat top of the rock, a mid-level terrace that includes the Lion Gate and the mirror wall with its frescoes, the lower palaces clings to the slopes below the rocks. The moats, walls and gardens of the palace extended for a few hundred metres from the base of the rock. The site was both a palace and a fortress. The upper palace on the top of the rock includes cisterns cut into the rock.

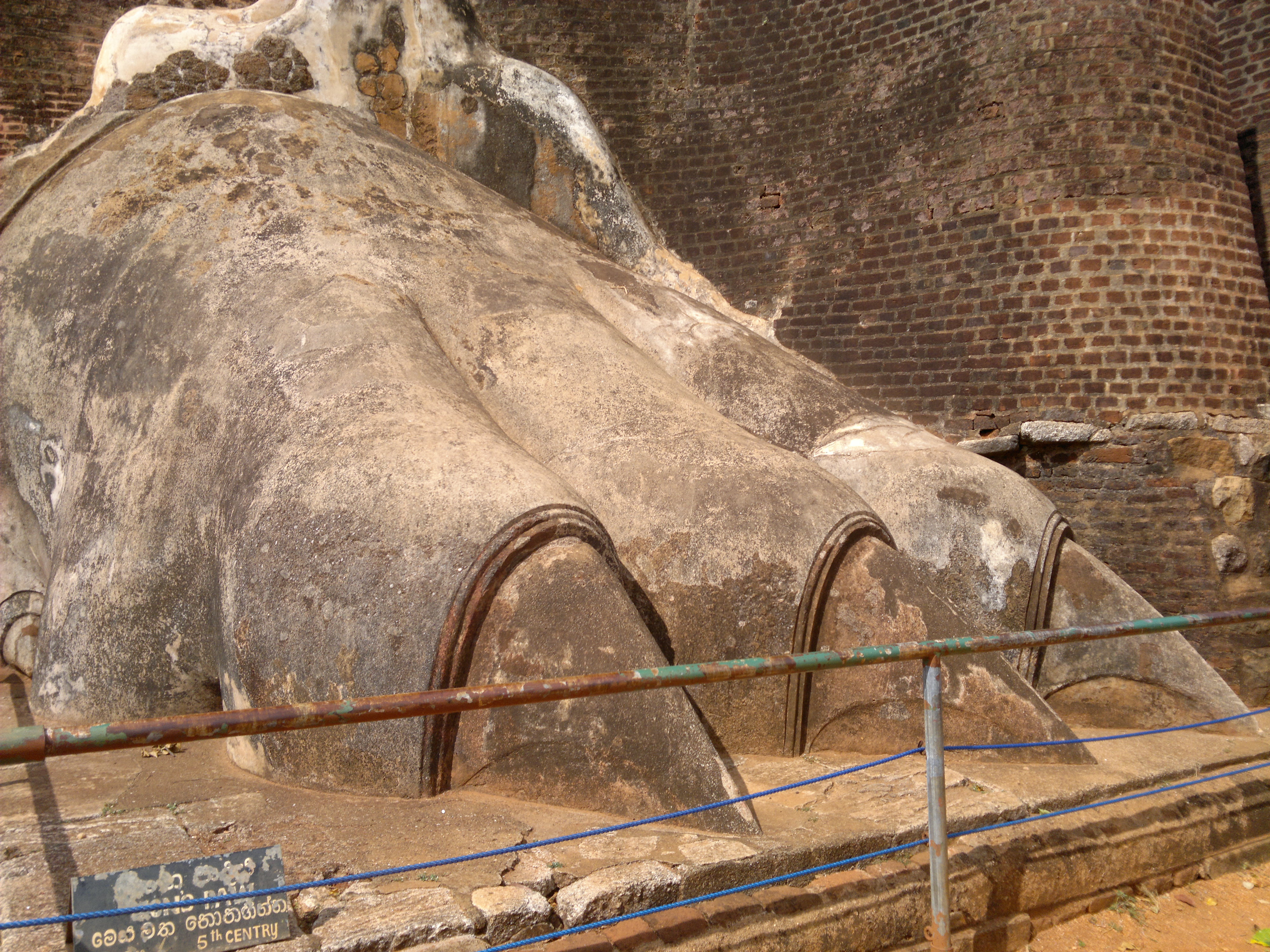
Close up of the Lion's Paw

=== Site plan ===
Sigiriya is considered to be one of the most important urban planning sites of the first millennium, and the site plan is considered very elaborate and imaginative. The plan combined concepts of symmetry and asymmetry to intentionally interlock the man-made geometrical and natural forms of the surroundings. On the west side of the rock lies a park for the royals, laid out on a symmetrical plan; the park contains water-retaining structures, including sophisticated surface/subsurface hydraulic systems, some of which are working today. The south contains a man-made reservoir; these were extensively used from the previous capital of the dry zone of Sri Lanka. Five gates were placed at entrances. The more elaborate western gate is thought to have been reserved for the royals.

== Frescoes ==
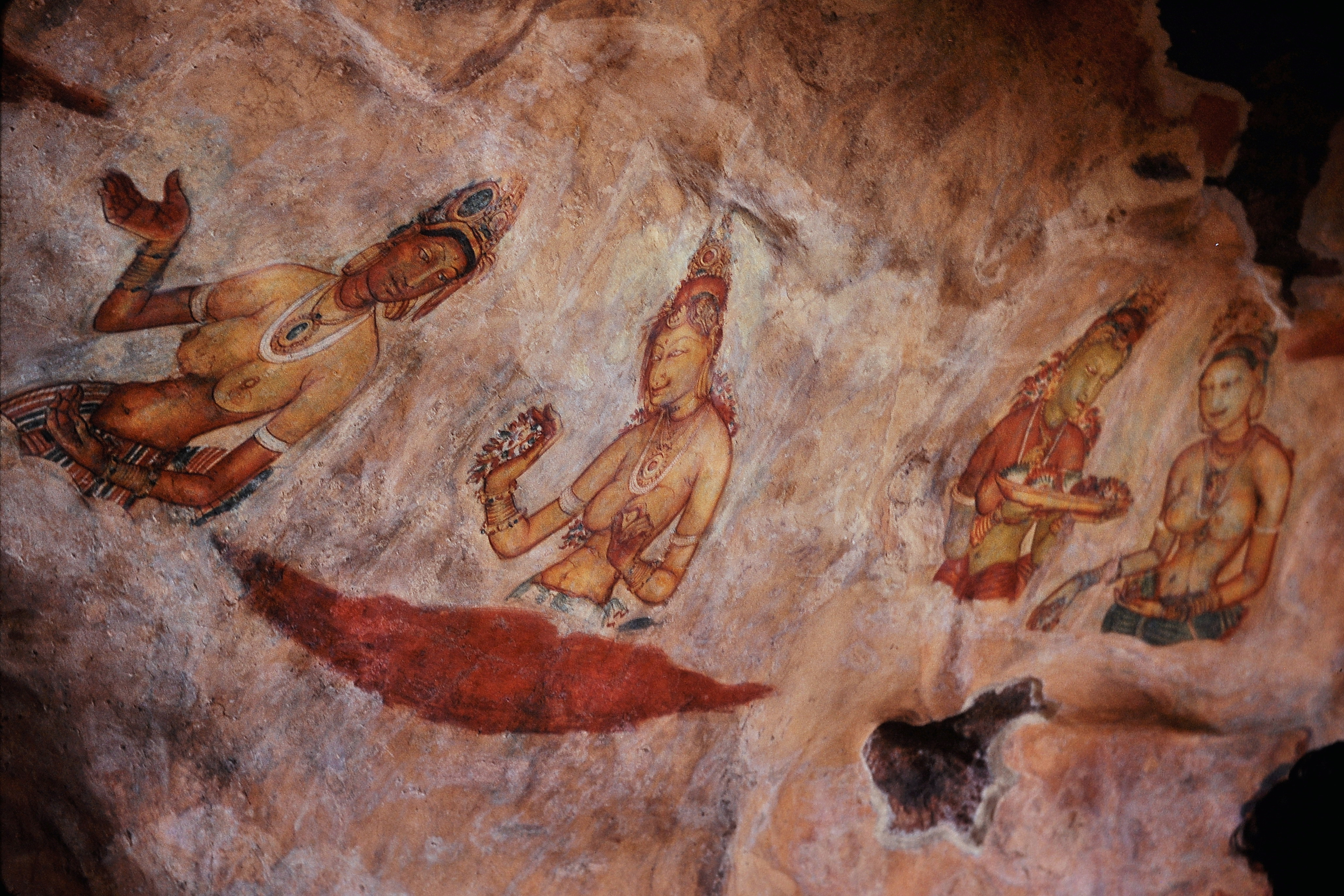
Sigiriya Maidens or Apsaras (celestial nymphs).

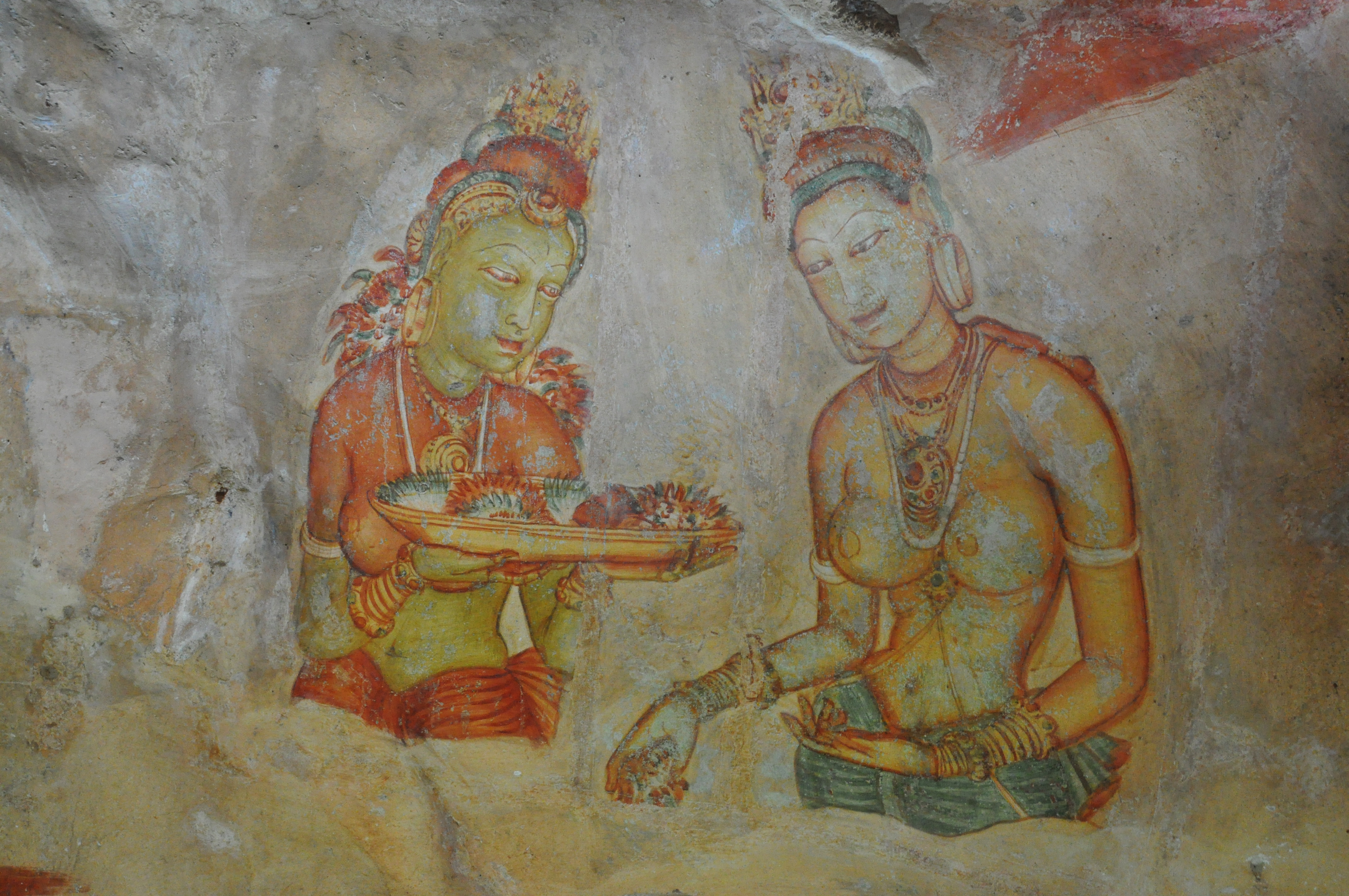
The Apsara on the left serves the tray with a Nil Mānel (Nymphaea nouchali), the national flower of Sri Lanka.

John Still in 1907 wrote, "The whole face of the hill appears to have been a gigantic picture gallery... the largest picture in the world perhaps". The paintings would have covered most of the western face of the rock, an area 140 m (460 ft) long and 40 m (130 ft) high. There are references in the graffiti to 500 ladies in these paintings. However, most have been lost forever. More frescoes, different from those on the rock face, can be seen elsewhere, for example on the ceiling of the location called the "Cobra Hood Cave".

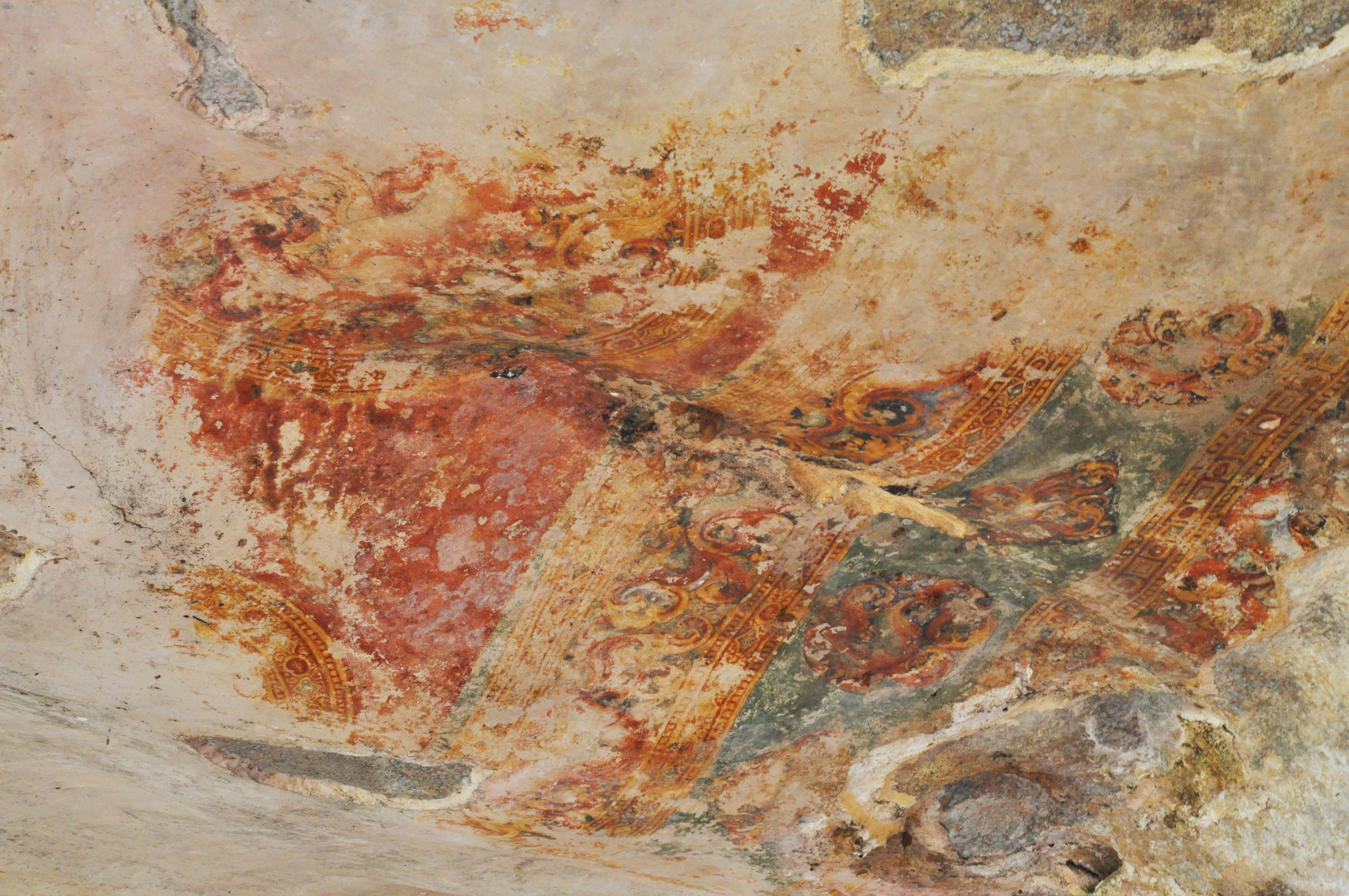
Frescos at Sigiriya found at Cobra hood cave

Although the frescoes are classified as in the Anuradhapura period, the painting style is considered unique; the line and style of application of the paintings differing from Anuradhapura paintings. The lines are painted in a form which enhances the sense of volume of the figures. The paint has been applied in sweeping strokes, using more pressure on one side, giving the effect of a deeper colour tone towards the edge. Other paintings of the Anuradhapura period contain similar approaches to painting, but do not have the sketchy lines of the Sigiriya style, having a distinct artists' boundary line. The true identity of the ladies in these paintings still has not been confirmed. There are various ideas about their identity. Some believe that they are the ladies of the kings while others think that they are women taking part in religious observances. These pictures have a close resemblance to paintings seen in the Ajanta Caves in India.

=== 1967 vandalism incident ===
On 14 October 1967, paint was splashed on the frescoes in an act of vandalism. Luciano Maranzi, an expert trained at the International Centre for the Study of the Preservation and Restoration of Cultural Property in Rome, assisted the restoration, which took until 11 April 1968. It was considered the most challenging effort undertaken by the Chemical Preservation Division of the Department of Archaeology. There is continued concern that the original colours of the frescoes are fading, with a report presented in 2010 suggesting that the 22 frescoes have been fading since 1930.

== Mirror wall ==
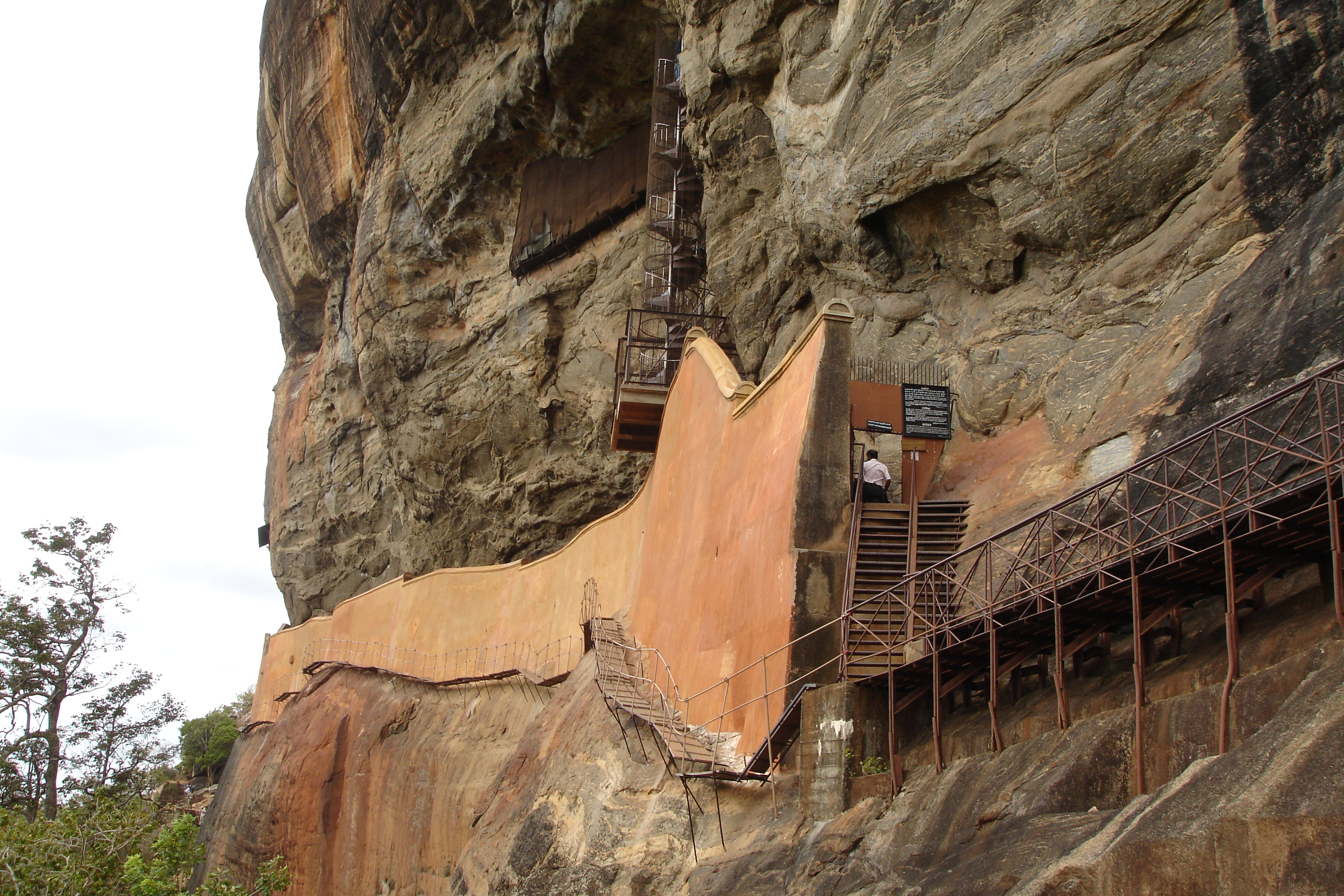
The mirror wall and spiral stairs leading to the frescoes

Originally this wall was so reflective that the king could see himself as he walked alongside it. Made of brick masonry and covered in highly polished white plaster, the wall is now partially covered with verses scribbled by visitors, some of them dating from as early as the 8th century. Most, however, date from the 9th and 10th century. People of all walks of life, from poets to provincial governors to housewives, wrote on the wall. This is the only evidence of poetry found in the Anuradhapura period.

One example is;

ඇසිමි දුන් හසුන් හසුන් සෙයින් විල් දුත්
Aesimi dun hasun hasun seyin vil dut
Like geese who have seen a lake, I listened to the message given by her.

මුල ලා මා සැනැහි පුල් පියුමන් සේය් බමර් දුත්
Mula la ma saenaehi pul piyuman sey bamar dut
Like a bee who has seen full-blown lotuses, the bewildered heart of mine was consoled.

This couplet uses a play on words as in the combination of hasun (message) with hasun (swans). The poet's eagerness to hear from his lady love is compared to the bee's fascination for lotus blooms, whose large petals provide it an easy landing pad to drink its nectar and frolic if it wishes.

Out of the 1500 plus poems, most are addressed to the ladies on the frescoes. Men praised their beauty and women shared their envy. A contemporary female, clearly less enamoured with the frescoes, records different, if equally passionate emotions:

"A deer-eyed maiden of the mountain side arouses anger in my mind. In her hand she holds a string of pearls, and in her eyes she assumes rivalry with me."

Further writing on the mirror wall now has been banned for the protection of the old writings. The Archaeological Commissioner of Ceylon, Senarath Paranavithana, deciphered 685 verses written in the 8th, 9th and 10th centuries CE on the mirror wall. One such poem from these long-past centuries,

බුදල්මි
සියොර ආමි සිහිගිරි
බැලීමි ගි බොහො ජන
ලිතූයෙන් නොලිමි

Roughly translated from ancient Sinhala, is: "I am Budal [the writer's name]. Came with hundreds of people to see Sigiriya. Since all the others wrote poems, I did not!"

== Gardens ==
The gardens of Sigiriya are among the oldest landscaped gardens in the world. The gardens are divided into three distinct but linked forms: water gardens, cave and boulder gardens, and terraced gardens.

Senake Bandaranayake identifies 'three traditions of landscape gardening' in Sigirya: the symmetrical or geometrically planned water gardens; the asymmetrical or organic cave and boulder gardens; and the stepped or terraced gardens at the base of the central rock. He suggests that the palace garden on the summit of the rock is an amalgamation or combination of these three garden traditions. He notes that the layout of the Sigirya represents combination of concepts of symmetry and asymmetry of a deliberate interlocking of geometrical plan and natural form. Sigirya geometric conception accommodates organic and asymmetrical elements such as the Sigirya rock itself, the terraced hill around the base of the rock, man-made features of the built landscape such as boulder gardens, serpentine streams, and cascades activated through hydraulic features show gardens borrowed scenery of the surrounding Kandalama mountains and Matale ranges. According to Ellepola, the water distribution through the water gardens was based on hydraulic systems which is caused by gravity action and created a gentle flow into the successively lower areas where the supply was required.

=== Water gardens ===
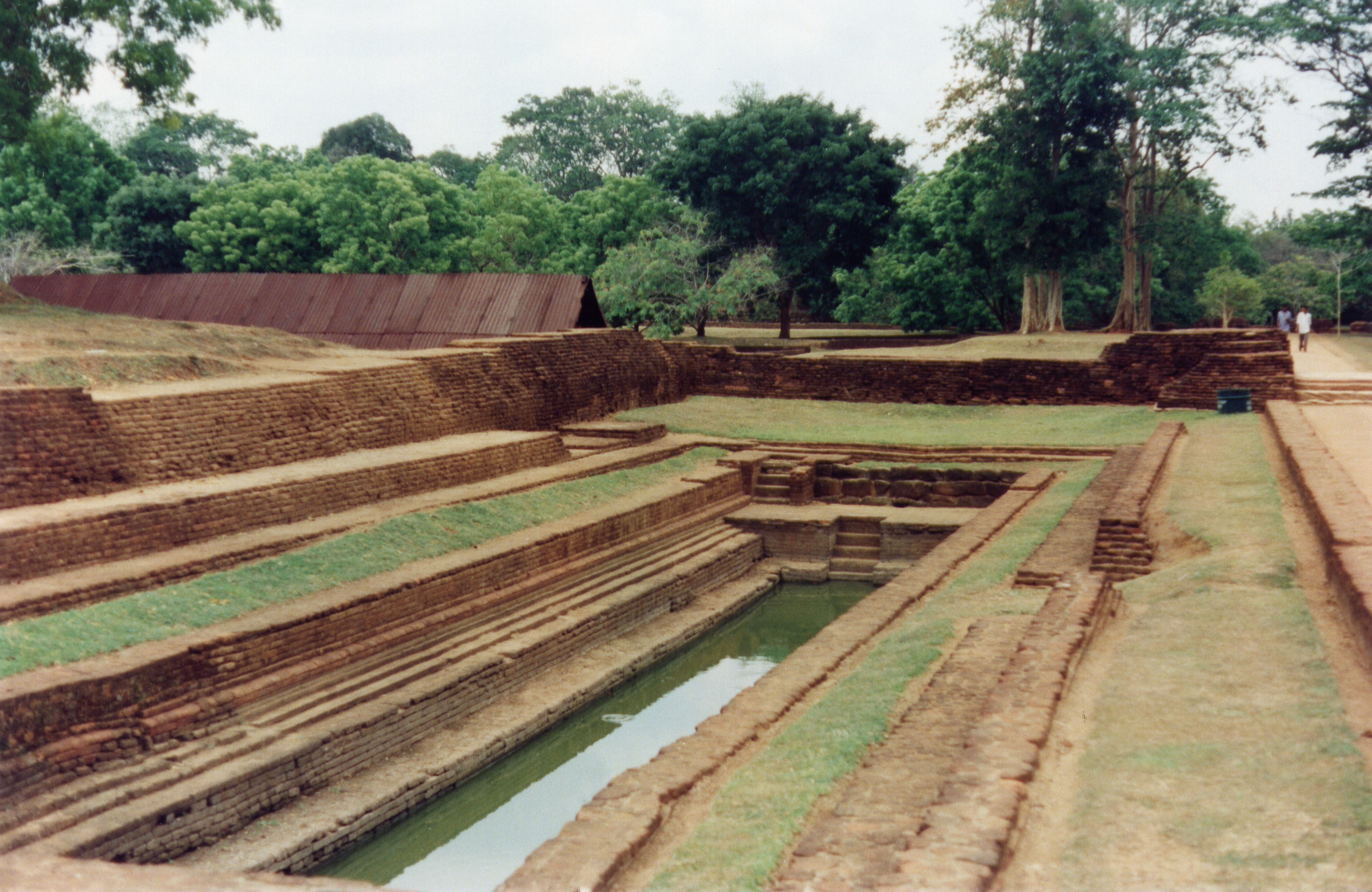
A pool in the garden complex

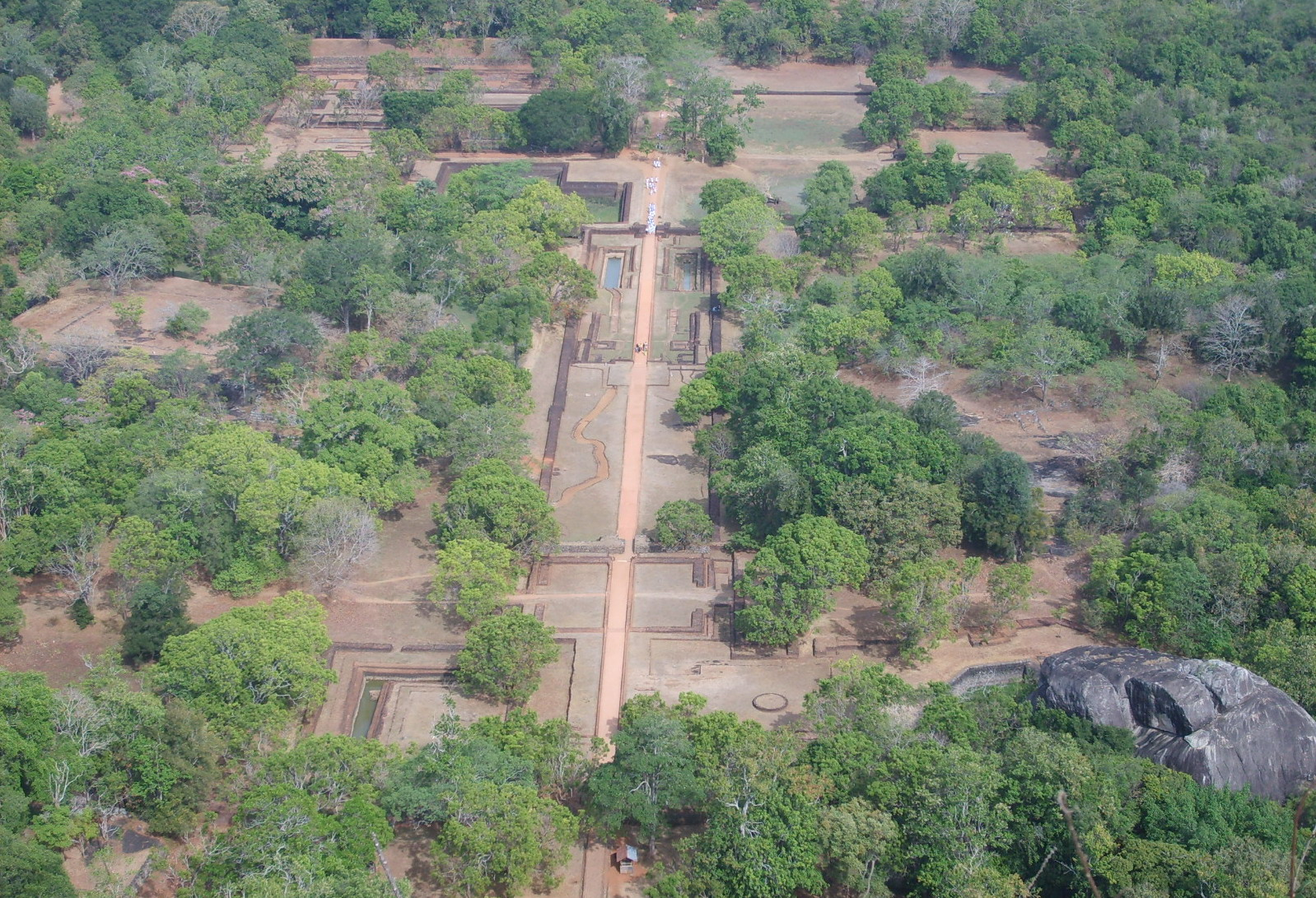
The gardens of Sigiriya, as seen from the summit of the Sigiriya rock

The water gardens are in the central section of the western precinct. Three principal gardens are found here. The first garden consists of a plot surrounded by water. It is connected to the main precinct using four causeways, with gateways placed at the head of each causeway.

The second contains two long, deep pools set on either side of the path. Two shallow, serpentine streams lead to these pools. Fountains made of circular limestone plates are placed here. Underground water conduits supply water to these fountains which are still functional, especially during the rainy season. Two large islands are located on either side of the second water garden. Summer palaces are built on the flattened surfaces of these islands. Two more islands are located farther to the north and the south. These islands are built in a manner similar to the island in the first water garden.

The third garden is situated on a higher level than the other two. It contains a large, octagonal pool with a raised podium on its northeast corner. The large brick and stone wall of the citadel is on the eastern edge of this garden.

The water gardens are built symmetrically on an east–west axis. The outer moat connects them on the west and the large artificial lake to the south of the Sigiriya rock. All the pools are also interlinked using an underground conduit network fed by the lake, and connected to the moats. A miniature water garden is located to the west of the first water garden, consisting of several small pools and watercourses. This recently discovered smaller garden appears to have been built after the Kashyapan period, possibly between the 10th and 13th centuries.

=== Boulder gardens ===
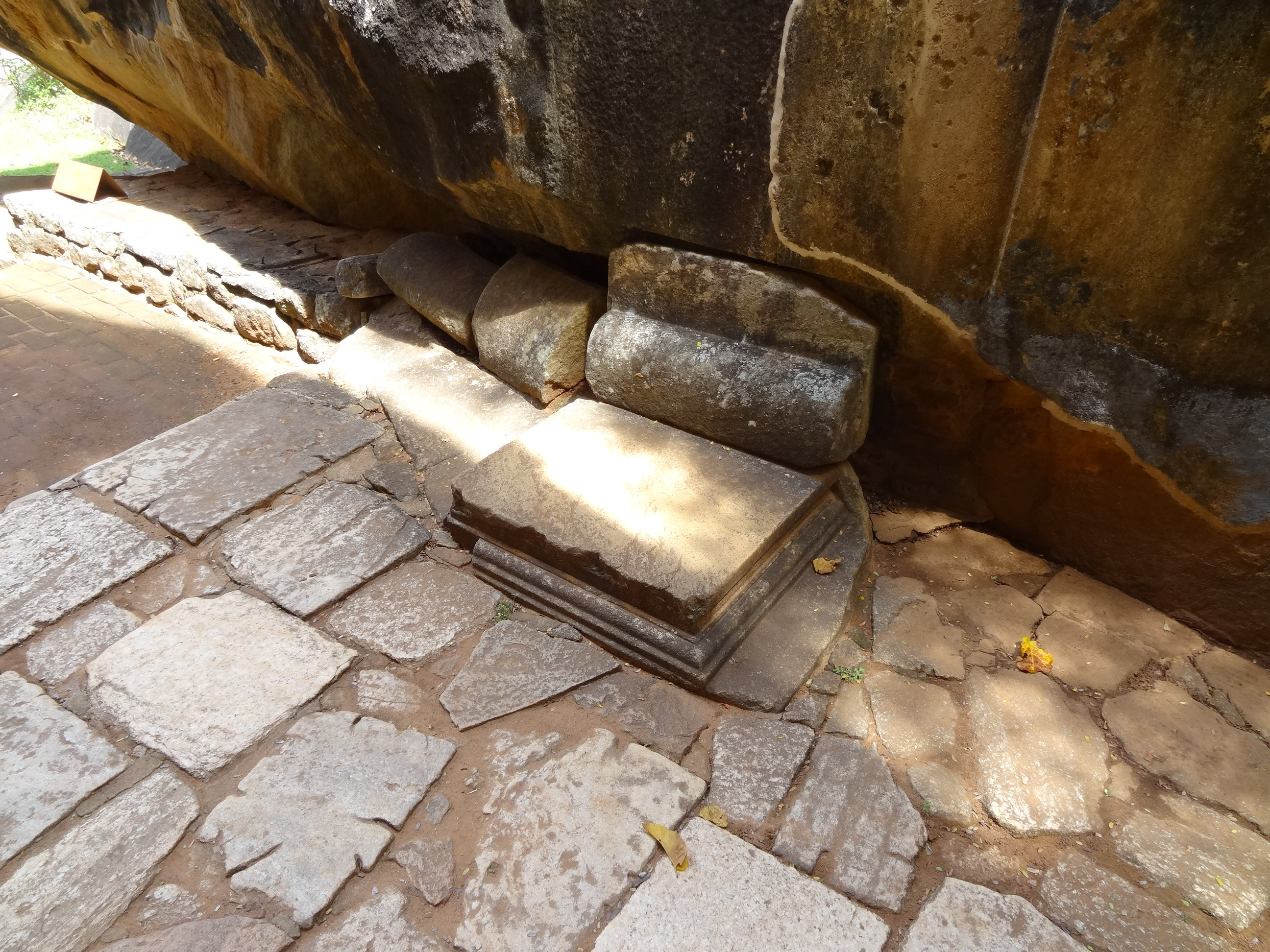
Carved stone seat in boulder gardens.

The boulder gardens consist of several large boulders linked by winding pathways. The gardens extend from the northern slopes to the southern slopes of the hills at the foot of Sigiris rock. Most of these boulders had a building or pavilion upon them; there are cuttings that were used as footings for brick walls and beams. They used to be pushed off from the top to attack enemies when they approached.

=== Terraced gardens ===
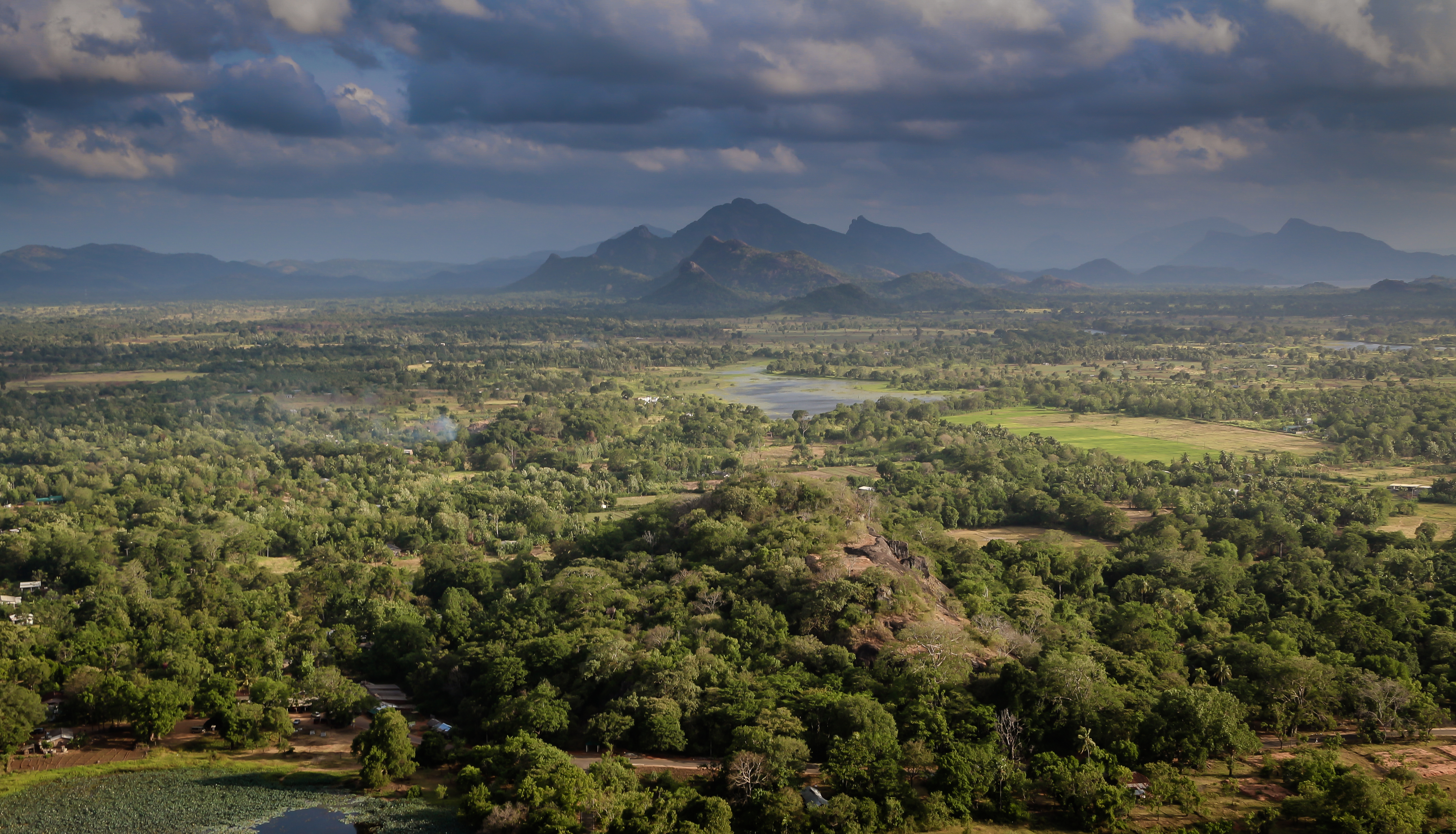
Views from the top of Sigiriya rock

The terraced gardens are formed from the natural hill at the base of the Sigiriya rock. A series of terraces rises from the pathways of the boulder garden to the staircases on the rock. These have been created by the construction of brick walls, and are located in a roughly concentric plan around the rock. The path through the terraced gardens is formed by a limestone staircase. From this staircase, there is a covered path on the side of the rock, leading to the uppermost terrace where the lion staircase is situated.

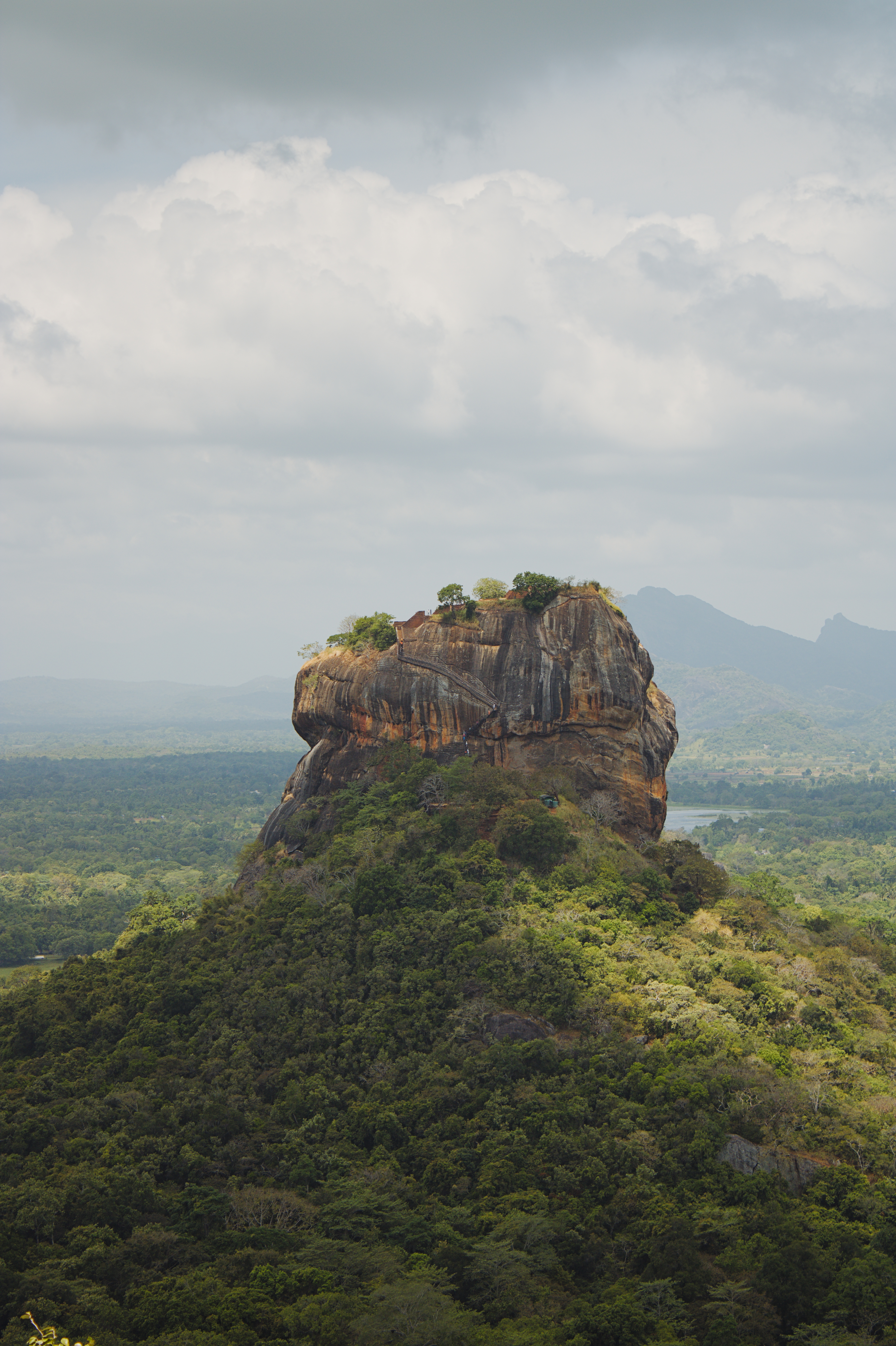
Sigiriya as seen from the nearby Pidurangala Rock.

== In popular culture ==
- Some scenes from the music video for the 1982 single "Save a Prayer" by Duran Duran were filmed at the top of Sigiriya.
- Sigiriya was featured in the eleventh episode of The Amazing Race 6 in 2005.
- Arthur C. Clarke based the fictional "Yakkagala" on Sigiriya in his novel The Fountains of Paradise. He felt that the reality of Sigiriya was "so astonishing that I have had no need to change it in any way."

== See also ==
- Mapagala fortress
- Masada
- Sherkala
