= Dickoya =

- Town
- Location in Sri Lanka
- Coordinates: 6°53′N 80°36′E
- Country: Sri Lanka
- Province: Central Province
- District: Nuwara Eliya District
- Elevation: 1,221 m (4,006 ft)
- Time zone: +5.30

Dickoya is a town in Nuwara Eliya District in the Central Province of Sri Lanka. Dickoya is administered by the Hatton-Dickoya Urban Council.

== Etymology ==
The town's name is derived from the Sinhalese words, Digha (long) and Oya (river), referring to the winding stream running through the valley.

== Popular places ==
- Christ Church Warleigh, Dickoya.
