= Vivienne Goonewardene =

Sri Lankan anti-colonial activist and politician (1916–1996)

Hon. Vivienne Goonewardene
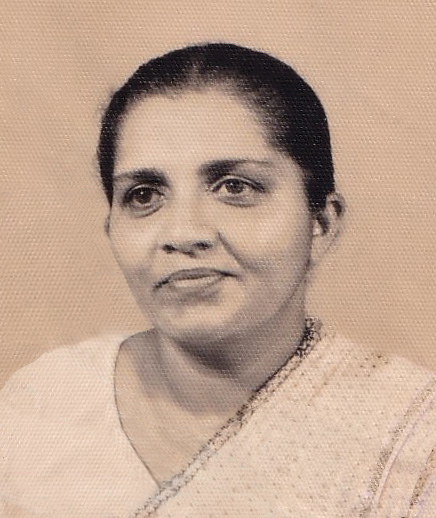
- Goonewardene in 1961

Secretary of Home Affairs
- In office 1964–1965

Junior Minister of Health
- In office 1970–1977

Member of the Ceylonese Parliament for Dehiwala-Mount Lavinia
- In office 1970–1977
- Preceded by: S. de Silva Jayasinghe
- Succeeded by: S. de Silva Jayasinghe
- Majority: 51.63%

Member of the Ceylonese Parliament for Borella Electoral District
- In office 1964–1965
- Preceded by: W. Danister de Silva
- Succeeded by: M. H. Mohamed
- Majority: 47.96%

Member of the Ceylonese Parliament for Colombo North Electoral District
- In office 1956–1960
- Preceded by: Cyril E. S. Perera
- Succeeded by: V. A. Sugathadasa
- Majority: 58.09%

Personal details
- Born: Violet Vivienne Goonetilleke; 18 September 1916 Ceylon
- Died: 10 March 1996 (aged 79) Colombo, Sri Lanka
- Party: Lanka Sama Samaja Party
- Other political affiliations: Bolshevik–Leninist Party of India, Ceylon and Burma
- Spouse: Leslie Goonewardene (m. 1939)
- Relations: Philip Gunawardena, Robert Gunawardena
- Children: Kumundu; Ajit Surendra; Premilla
- Education: Musaeus College; University College, Colombo
- Occupation: Independence activist; politician; statesman; philanthropist

Violet Vivienne Goonewardene (Note: Her surname is transliterated as both Goonewardene and Goonewardena often appearing with multiple spellings in the same source, as in Tomorrow Is Ours by Ervin.) (Sinhala: වයලට් විවියන් ගුණවර්ධන, Tamil: வயலட் விவியென் கூனவர்தன; 18 September 1916 – 3 October 1996), commonly known as "Vivi", was a Sri Lankan anti-colonial activist and prominent politician, serving as one of the world's first female ministers. A key figure in both the Indian independence movement and the Sri Lankan independence movement, Goonewardene was a prominent member on the non-aligned stage, where she fought against perceived injustices and was critical of the Middle East diplomacy sponsored by the United States. Goonewardene was the first and, to date, only female National Hero of Sri Lanka. By her death, she was one of the Left's most vibrant personalities, and the foremost female figure in the Sri Lankan leftist movement.

Born into an affluent family to a pro-monarchy conservative, while at secondary school, Goonewardene became involved in the anti-imperialist Suriya-Mal Movement, fighting against perceived injustices. She volunteered during the 1934 Malaria Epidemic, at which time she witnessed rampant malnutrition of the poor. Despite being disallowed by her father from pursuing higher education, her maternal uncles, Philip and Robert Gunawardena, helped her attend university, where she was often involved in activism. It was here that she met her husband, Leslie Goonewardene, who had founded in 1935 Sri Lanka's first political party, the Lanka Sama Samaja Party.

During her political career, she was instrumental in the rise of the Lanka Sama Samaja Party. With the beginning of the Second World War, Goonewardene evaded arrest by fleeing to India under a false name. There, she immersed herself in the Quit India Movement, culminating in India's independence from Britain in 1947. Upon her return to Sri Lanka, she played a large role in Sri Lanka's independence from Britain in 1948. From the 1940s to 1960s, the Lanka Sama Samaja Party was Sri Lanka's main opposition party and in the 1960s, the party led the United Front coalition; through their election landslide bringing in the first female Prime Minister. Goonewardene served as a prominent member of Parliament, and as President of the All Ceylon Local Government Worker's Union from 1949 until her death. Through this, Goonewardene attempted to reform the former British colony of Ceylon into a socialist republic by nationalising organisations in the banking, education, industry, media, and trade sectors.

== Early life and political beginnings ==
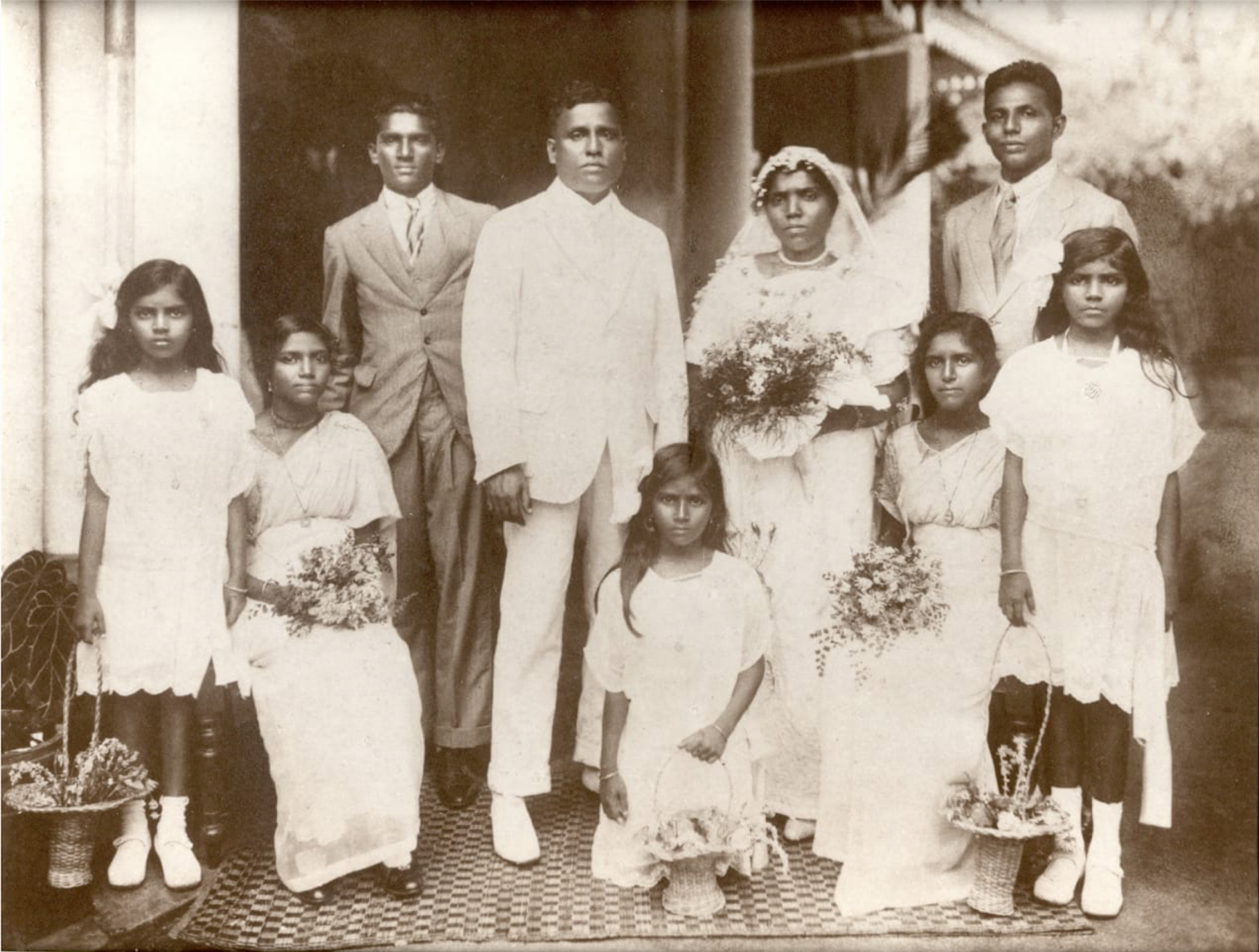
The Goonetilleke family, including Vivienne, at her aunt's wedding – 1924/5.

Goonewardene was born in Colombo on 18 September 1916 as Violet Vivienne Goonetilleke. She was the eldest of five children born to Dr. Don Allenson Goonetilleke, a pro-monarchy conservative who believed in the continuous British rule of Ceylon, and his wife Emily Angeline Gunawardena. As a physician, her father was often transferred to various parts of Ceylon. She was named Vivienne after the French nurse who had helped to deliver her. Goonewardene spent her early youth in Tissamaharama, a remote village in which her father was stationed.

Goonewardene's maternal grandfather, Don Jakolis Rupasinghe Gunawardena, was a wealthy landowner having served as the village headman under colonial governance. He was known as "Boralugoda Ralahamy" by locals; this came from him being the headman, or ralahamy, of the village of Boralugoda. He was a leader in the Buddhist revival of the early 20th Century and was one of those incarcerated by the Governor General, Robert Chalmers, under the pretext of involvement in the Sinhala-Muslim riots of 1915. Ralahamy was sentenced to death, in part as an attempt by Chalmers to eliminate regional nationalistic leaders and to suppress a possible independence movement from springing out of the disturbances. This sentence was later reprieved by the governor general following a public outcry, yet led to Ralahamy's strengthened disapproval of British rule; one which was projected onto Vivienne. Goonewardene's maternal grandmother, Gunasekara Hamine of Siyane Korale, also came from immense wealth and the landed gentry. Hamine was a large influence on Vivienne in her youth; despite her status, due to the lack of medical professionals, Hamine would personally assist in the birth of every child at a building she had funded.

== Education and early activism ==
To enable Vivienne access to a sound education, her parents agreed to send her to boarding school. Goonewardene was educated at Musaeus College, a private girls' school in Colombo along with her younger sister Tulin Kulasinghe. There, she was elected head girl in 1933. Despite her position in the school, Vivienne was noted for her acts of defiance of authority. It was while studying at Musaeus College that her interest in politics developed.

=== Suriya-Mal Movement and 1934 Malaria epidemic ===
While serving as head girl, she became deeply involved in the Suriya-Mal Movement. This movement was a protest against the proceeds of poppy sales on Armistice Day (11 November) being used for the benefit of the British ex-servicemen to the detriment of Ceylonese ex-servicemen. One of the latter, Mr. Aelian Perera, had started a rival sale of Suriya flowers on the same day. The proceeds of each sale were devoted to help needy Ceylonese ex-servicemen. While the selling of the Suriya flower had begun in 1931, by 1933 the selling of it instead of the poppy on 11 November was launched on the initiative of the South Colombo Youth League. The movement had the slogan of "against slavery and poverty and for freedom and prosperity".

On Remembrance Day 1934, Goonewardene sold the Suriya flower in her school to students and teachers. She noted that it was a complete success with the students, but only a half-success with the older generation. It was from this mass-nationalist campaign that the Lanka Sama Samaja Party (LSSP) was later founded. Vivienne did go further, leading fellow students to place their boxes of instruments atop the blackboards and at 11.00 a.m. to topple these, with the subsequent noise masking that of the ceremonial gun salute.

The Suriya-Mal Movement volunteered extensively during the 1934 disasters. A drought caused a shortage of rice, estimated at 3 million bushels; floods, from October onwards; and a malaria epidemic, affecting 1,000,000 people with at least 125,000 deaths, which continued through 1935, heavily affected the poor. The Goonetilleke's residence was converted into a hospital for the sick. The volunteers, including Vivienne, observed that there was widespread malnutrition among the poor, which was aggravated by the shortage of rice, and which reduced resistance to the disease.

=== Later education ===
Goonewardene's father, as a traditionalist, opposed the continued education of Vivienne and believed that she should be married off to another man of wealth. As she was at boarding school and her father was often travelling, her Uncle Robert and Aunt Caroline were given the authority to remove Vivienne from school. Robert helped her, against her father's wishes, leave school to attend classes for the Cambridge Matriculation Examination, which she passed at age 16. While still residing at Musaeus College, Gunawardene was secretly tutored by her teacher, Marjorie Davidson, to sit for the University's Scholarship Examination. Here, she won an exhibition at the scholarship examination as well as a scholarship to study English Honours at University College, Colombo. Upon discovering her university acceptance, Goonetilleke refused to let Vivienne study there. Despite this, her uncles and father's friends persuaded him to allow her to study – she later completed her studies, through his efforts to hinder her.

At University College, Goonewardene boarded at the women's hostel on Queen's road. As her father did not allow Goonewardene to join the drama society, she turned to the university's debating club. Here, she faced much discrimination for her gender from the opposition in a largely male-based activity, but proceeded. Her debate partner, Horace Perera, recalled an incident in which this was displayed:

Vivi was quite small made and rather slim. de Haan began with the words "I hope ladies and gentlemen that you will not be misled by the childish arguments of Mr. Horace Perera and his little supporter in rompers." Following Vivienne's complaint to the chair, de Haan responded "I am very sorry Sir. I hope ladies and gentlemen you will not be misled by the charming lady without rompers." It took Shirley (the chair) several minutes to regain control of the house.

=== Entry into the Lanka Sama Samaja Party ===
The Lanka Sama Samaja Party (LSSP) was founded on 18 December 1935 as the first political party in the nation. It was created with the broad aims of independence from British rule and socialism by a group of young people who had gathered together for that purpose. The group at the commencement numbered six, composed principally of students who had principally returned from education abroad, influenced deeply by the ideas of Karl Marx and Lenin.

Included in its founders were Vivienne's uncles, Philip and Robert. Being so close to the founding members of the party, Goonewardene began attending meetings. She attended these meetings with her Aunt Caroline and Uncle Robert. Vivienne also joined the anti-Fascist demonstrations against Spain's Franco organised by the Party in Colombo. It was partly her rebellious nature that led Vivienne to pay the membership fee of 25 cents and join the LSSP.

Her stint in politics and education ended abruptly when her father received an anonymous letter stating that Vivienne had visited a political rally in the presence of other men. Having only completed the first year's examination, Goonewardene was brought home having despite the pleas of her teachers. Unable to attend classes and lectures, her Uncle Robert helped her pursue an external degree at the University of London, which she took as a General Degree in Arts. She continued to secretly attend political rallies in the company of her Aunt Caroline.

== Raising a family ==
Vivienne met Leslie Goonewardene at a protest on the Spanish Civil war in March 1937. Goonewardene was a founder of the Lanka Sama Samaja Party in 1935, and served as its Secretary General and leader. He was born on 31 October 1909 in Panadura, south-western Ceylon, to the wealthy Methodist Goonewardene family, which was active in local colonial-era politics. The Goonewardene family were major proprietors of coconut property. Goonewardene's mother died when he was a toddler. She was from the well-known Fernando family of 'Whitehall' Katana, one of the wealthiest families in Ceylon, privately owning very significant amounts of land.

Leslie was educated at S. Thomas' College, Mount Lavinia, later being sent to a Welsh Publish school and studying at the London School of Economics. At LSE, he became well acquainted with Vivienne's uncles, Robert and Philip, with whom he founded the LSSP. Leslie was considered the ideologue of the party, especially in the 1935-36 period. He was later described by Hector Abhayavardhana as "the custodian of the consciousness of the LSSP".

Following their meetings, Leslie would often drop in to the Goonetilleke's home in Diddeniya. As a friend of Philip, he was always welcome and was well liked by the Goonetilleke family. Dr. Don Allenson especially admired him, not just because he came of a family of immense wealth, but due to his lack of arrogance. Often he would instruct his sons to "be like Leslie". The 1930s were a period of rapid expansion for the LSSP, who had fielded candidates and achieved great success in the Second State Elections. They held a rally on 1 April 1937 at Galle Face Green, attracting as many as 35,000 people. Following the success in the Bracegirdle affair, Vivienne was invited to a dinner at which Leslie declared his love for her.

"My own view was that Vivi was his favourite in the family - bright, talented and attractive. When she went against his wishes, it affected him greatly and his personality changed.

— Brother of Vivienne., Biography of Vivienne.

The two intended to wed, but Vivienne's father was against the relationship because Goonewardene was a Christian, from the minority Karava caste and a revolutionary under surveillance. She was kept a virtual prisoner at home, and Goonewardene was forced to file a habeas corpus writ, a recourse in law through which a person can report an unlawful detention or imprisonment to a court, to get her released. While she was kept a prisoner, she was still able to secretly write letters to Leslie with the help of a local bookseller. During the legal battle, they were notably represented by their attorney, the future President and Prime Minister of Sri Lanka J. R. Jayewardene. The couple were married on 30 June 1939, at the Hotel Nippon in Slave Island.

== Indian Independence ==
With the outbreak of the Second World War, the Lanka Sama Samaja Party experienced an upsurge in support, characterising the Second World War as "an imperialist war". This support led to the party's re-establishment underground, a necessary move due to its vocal anti-war stance, opposing the British war effort. Members of the party, including two State Council members, as well as others in its leadership—including N.M. Perera, Philip Gunawardena and Colvin R. de Silva—were arrested and jailed, but Vivienne evaded arrest while her husband, Leslie, went underground.

=== The Bolshevik–Leninist Party of India, Ceylon and Burma ===
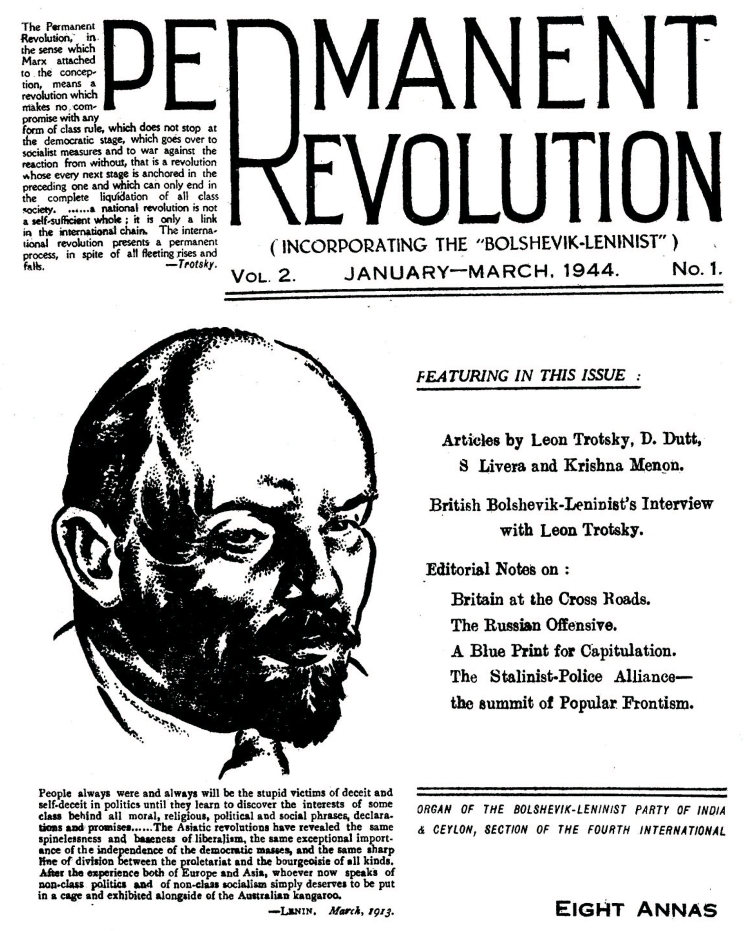
The BLPI.

By the later part of 1940, Vivienne was heavily pregnant with her first child. At this time, Leslie was in hiding following the LSSP's proscription. Leslie fled to India to continue their activism with less scrutiny. Though Philip Gunawardena, N.M. Perera, Edmund Samarakkody, and Colvin R. de Silva were detained in Ceylon, Leslie was in India, his properties in Ceylon seized. He settled in Calcutta and established networks with the local Trotskyist organisations, including that of the Uttar Pradesh Trotskyist group, as well as groups in Bombay and Madras. Through discussion, the Indian and Ceylonese Trotskyists led by Leslie established a preliminary committee for the formation of the Bolshevik–Leninist Party of India, Ceylon and Burma (BLPI for short).

The discussions for this took place through underground meetings in Kandy in December 1940 and March 1941 and set the stage for a sole Trotskyist party for India. An underground conference was held on 20 April 1941, attended by 42 delegates. At this conference, the Lanka Sama Samaja Party conceived a new constitution and manifesto, both of which were accepted by the delegates. The meetings in 1940 and 1941 were also attended by the other detained LSSP leaders, who had been aided by their imprisoner; the imprisoner later helped them escape their prison on 7 April 1942. The BLPI was formed in May 1942 and was approved by the Fourth International. Through this, the now-public BLPI, fronted by Goonewardene, S.C.C. Anthonipillai, Robert Gunawardena, William de Silva, and V. Karalasingham, focused on continuing strike waves that had begun in May 1941. These continued through 1942 and 1944.

Initially, during World War II, the Goonewardene-led BLPI remained relatively small—a large contrast to the high expectations of a subcontinent-wide political revolutionary party. Whilst the BLPI's full name, the Bolshevik–Leninist Party of India, Ceylon and Burma, suggests that it also represented Burma, there was arguably no party representation there. The BLPI, however, found later success, launching Spark, its party publication issued in the party's base of Calcutta. Due to political suppression, the publication was moved to Bombay and its name was changed to New Spark. They published Trotsky's open letter to the Indian workers and other pieces. While Vivienne was busy raising a child, Leslie was a key contributor to the party publications, writing under the pseudonym, K. Tilak. During the remainder of World War II, the BLPI was able to influence the trade union and student movements in several cities. Significant membership was recorded among tramway workers, as well as workers of the Buckingham and Carnatic Mills.

=== Quit India Movement and party split ===
In December 1941, by which point, Vivienne's eldest child, Kumundini was just over a year old, Vivienne moved permanently to India. Her travel had not yet been restricted as she wasn't, at this time, on the colonial authorities' wanted list. On her way to India, she disguised herself as Mrs. Alan Mendis, and was accompanied by Alan Mendis. From Trincomalee, Vivienne, her daughter and helpers travelled to Madhurai by boat, where they were met by S. C. C. Anthony Pillai and taken to safe shelter.

In India, Vivienne immersed herself in the Quit India Movement, a movement with the demand to end the British Rule of India. She remained uncaptured throughout the war years both in Ceylon and India. In 1943, Vivienne also sheltered Jeanne Hoban from the authorities when she was threatened with deportation for organising plantation workers unions. Following the Quit India Movement, hope was rife among the South-Asian socialist leaders. Leslie Goonewardene, under the pseudonym K. Tilak, wrote that the "young Bolshevik-Leninist Party ... now faces its first real chance for expansion ... The situation is changing and without doubt, of all of the parties and political groups in India, the BLPI is the one which is going to gain the most in this change."

Albeit the help, with an infant to care for Goonewardene's political involvement was significantly lessened. While in India, she and Leslie took on the identity of a Goanese family. Mr. and Mrs. Pinto. Vivienne also taught herself Hindi.

==== Initial party split. ====
During the war there was a split in the movement. N. M. Perera and Philip Gunawardena opposed a merger into the BLPI and formed the 'Workers' Opposition'. After the war, they reconstructed LSSP as an independent party. Members of the other section, formed out of the exiled BLPI nucleus, effectively maintained a separate party, the Bolshevik Samasamaja Party (BSP). The latter group functioned as the Ceylon section of BLPI and was led by Colvin R de Silva, Leslie Goonawardene and Edmund Samarakkoddy.

The relation between the two groups was often antagonistic. The BSP accused the LSSP of 'organisational Menshevism'. The LSSP accused the BSP of being introvert doctrinaires. LSSP wanted to build a mass-based party, whereas the BSP concentrated on building a cadre-based (revolutionary) party. On 25 October 1945 fist-fights broke out at between the two groups at a meeting of the BSP.

== Return to Sri Lanka ==
When Goonewardene returned to Sri Lanka following the end of the Second World War, the LSSP was split, with two separate groups under the LSSP name. One was led by N. M. Perera and Philip Gunawardena and the other by Leslie and Colvin R. de Silva. Vivienne identified with the latter of the two factions. The LSSP and the BSP were both at the helm of the strike waves that occurred in the post-war period. In 1946 there was a brief reconciliation between the two factions. At the general election of 1947 the LSSP emerged as the main opposition party, with 10 seats. The BSP obtained 5 seats. They also had the support of the Ceylon Indian Congress (CIC - which later became the Ceylon Workers' Congress) of Natesa Iyer, which had 6 members in Parliament and of various independent members. However, SWRD Bandaranaike and his Sinhala Maha Sabha backed the newly formed United National Party (UNP), which was thus able to form a government under DS Senanayake.

Goonewardene's return led to her founding and becoming one of the major backers of the world's first socialist women's organisation, United Women's Front or ‘Eksath Kantha Peramuna’. The party did, however, collapse shortly after its conception alongside the Soviet-backed Communist Party withdrawing support of it as part of its non-co-operation policy with Trotskyists.

=== Sri Lankan Independence ===
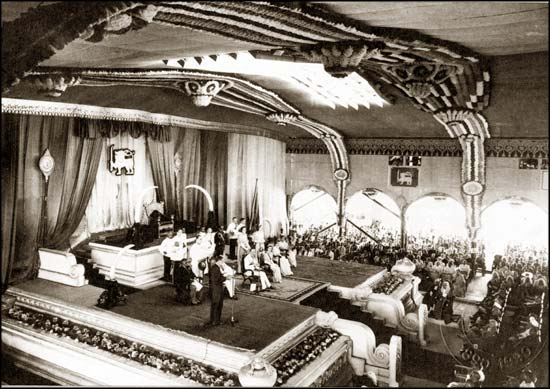
The Ceylonese Independence Ceremony, 1948.

Following the end of the war, the LSSP's proscription ended, and Leslie was able to return to Ceylon to work further on the independence movement. The Lanka Sama Samaja Party led Sri Lankan independence movement succeeded when, on 4 February 1948, Ceylon was granted independence as the Dominion of Ceylon. Dominion status within the British Commonwealth was retained for the next 24 years until 22 May 1972, when it became a republic and was renamed the Democratic Socialist Republic of Sri Lanka. The armed forces continued to be commanded by British Officers and the Royal Navy and the RAF continued to have bases on the island (at Trincomalee and Katunayake). The Government was heavily pro-British and anti-Soviet. The new government proceeded to disenfranchise plantation workers of Indian Tamils descent, using the Ceylon Citizenship Act of 1948 and the Parliamentary Elections Amendment Act of 1949. These measures were intended primarily to undermine the Left electorally.

== Electoral politics ==
In December 1949, Vivienne stood for the Bolshevik Samasamaja Party to represent the Havelock Town ward of the Colombo Municipal Council. Despite the significant numerical advantage that the LSSP found themselves, Vivienne set out to canvass with her second child, Suren. This numerical advantage was visible by the number of candidates each party fielded. While the LSSP fielded 28, the BSP fielded only 10. While campaigning, her father had become very ill. With the aided presence of his young grandson, Vivienne was able to break down the barriers with her father. Regardless of this, he remained adamant that she be disinherited. Her father died on the night of the election, his final query had been "has Vivi won", to which a relative had replied "yes".

=== Colombo Municipal Council ===
Mrs. Vivienne Goonewardene moved that the Medical Officers of the Minicipal Council should be requested to hold regular inspection of children of pre-school age in shanty town housing schemes at least once in three months in view of the very high child mortality in the city.

— Minutes of CMC, 27 May 1960.

Goonewardene remained a member of the Colombo Municipal Council from 1950 until July 1954 and again from 30 January 1960 until December 1969. While a councillor, she was known dedicated her time to the betterment of the lives of the poor. Goonewardene orchestrated the improvement of sanitation, the provision of lighting and the widening of paths in shanty towns. She was instrumental in the organisation of sewing classes for single mothers. While a councillor, she fought for the rights of the dead – notably in terms of burial facilities, as well as taking issue with the high levels of child mortality in shanty towns.

While a Municipal Councillor, she gave a lift to Ranasinghe Premadasa every day. He became President of Sri Lanka in 1989, coming from a slum area and joining the rival United National Party.

==== President of the All Ceylon Local Government Worker's Union ====
Vivienne also had offices outside of the Colombo Municipal Council, allowing her to serve not just her own constituency. She was also appointed President of the All Ceylon Local Government Worker's Union. While under N.M. Perera, the union was able to secure the permanency of employment to the workers, as well as the right to pension and retirement. Under Vivienne, the Union won widows and orphans pension. While the LSSP were the main opposition party, a bill was introduced by the Party that increased the monthly pay of State Workers by Rs. 7.5, however Municipal council workers were excluded by this. Vivienne brought this up with the Minister of Finance, J. R. Jayewardene, who proceeded to include Municipal Workers in the bill. In 1964, while the Sri Lanka Freedom Party leftist coalition was in power, Goonewardene demanded parity of status for state employees and CMC workers. Goonewardene remained President of the All Ceylon Local Government Worker's Union until her death.

=== Reunification ===
The split between the LSSP and the BSP had weakened the movement, and in particular the BSP which was clearly the smaller of the two parties. A process of reunification was initiated, and in 1950 the BSP merged into the LSSP. Through the reunification, the LSSP became the Ceylonese section of the Fourth International. However, Philip Gunawardena opposed the reconciliation with the BSP. Thus he left LSSP and formed a new party, Viplavakari Lanka Sama Samaja Party (VLSSP).

At the 1952 general election, the electoral performance was harmed by the relative prosperity due to the price of natural rubber being driven up by the Korean War. During this election, Vivienne contested the Kelaniya seat for the LSSP. Vivienne's Buddhist background gave her an advantage while contesting the seat, however the seat was contested by the SLFP's Wimala Wijewardene, who received the support of the Kelaniya temple's Buddhist monks. While campaigning, Vivienne's third child, Premilla, was born, further limiting the extent to which she could canvass. The seat was won by J. R. Jayewardene, following that year's political trend towards the UNP. Also, the disenfranchisement of the Indian Tamil estate workers by the UNP government deprived the LSSP of one of its main bases. Moreover, it damaged the electoral fortunes of its ally, the CIC, which went unrepresented.

=== Hartal and after ===
In 1953, the LSSP took the lead in organising the Hartal. The immediate cause for the Hartal was a hike in the price of rice from 25 cent to 70 cent per measure by the UNP government. At the time, J.R. Jayawardena was the finance minister of the country. Maintaining the price of rice at 25 cent had been an electoral promise given by UNP in the 1952 elections, and when the new rates were introduced to the public, uproar ensued. This anger was furthered by the suspension of the meals given to schoolchildren and hikes in rail ticket fares and postal fees.

Prior to 1953, the concept of a 'Hartal', of General strike, was relatively unknown in Ceylon. Through their exile, the LSSP leaders had witnessed the immense impact of the hartals during the Quit India Movement, ensuring that this knowledge was brought with them. The Communist Party and VLSSP supported the Hartal and the SLFP and CIC expressed sympathy for the demand of the Hartal, but did not actively support the call for strike. The Ceylon Mercantile Union supported the demands of the strike, but in not take part in it. Rather it encouraged their members to go to work wearing black armbands as a means to protest.

The Hartal took the country to a complete standstill. Afraid of a revolution in the making, the government cabinet sought refuge on HMS Newfoundland, a Royal Navy warship offshore. The mass upsurge that accompanied the action of the strikers caused Dudley Senanayake to resign from the premiership. The Hartal emoboldended the LSSP to start to consider that the party might be able to seize state power. During the Hartal, Vivienne insisted that a black flag, the sign of the Hartal, be hoisted upon the roof of the Colombo Town Hall. In 1956 the LSSP went into a no-contest pact with the Mahajana Eksath Peramuna (People's United Front) of SWRD Bandaranaike, which he had formed with Philip Gunawardena and the VLSSP. The MEP won a landslide in the polls held that year. The LSSP once again became the main opposition party, and N. M. Perera became the Leader of Opposition. Through this, the LSSP supported the reforms initiated by the new government, but strongly opposed the 'Sinhala Only' policy. Vivienne was elected as a Member of Parliament in the Colombo North Electoral District between 1956 and 1960, where she won 58.09% of the vote. In July 1959, both LSSP and the Communist Party withdrew their support for the government, as inner-party feuds within the SLFP had resulted in a temporary victory for the right-wing and expulsions of leftist ministers like Philip Gunawardena.

In March 1960, the LSSP contested the general elections on the slogan 'forward to a Sama Samaja Government'. The votes won by the LSSP, the Communists and the Mahajana Eksath Peramuna (a new party, not the 1956 front) of Philip Gunawardena, were sufficient to have made them the biggest bloc in Parliament. However, due to their contesting separately, the LSSP and the MEP won just 10 seats each, the CP a mere 3. Elections were held again in July and the LSSP had a no-contest pact with the Sri Lanka Freedom Party (SLFP) of Sirimavo Bandaranaike, which was thus able to form a government. Despite their success in the election, the Fourth International was highly critical of the electoral tactics of LSSP, and the LSSP chose not to attend the World Congress of International the following year.

In 1962, officers of the Army and Police attempted a coup d'état aimed at overthrowing the government and bringing the UNP to power. This plot was foiled, and the SLFP lurched leftwards in terms of policy. The local branches of petroleum companies were nationalised, leading to a boycott of the country by the oil multi-nationals; the boycott was broken with help from the Kansas Oil Producers Co-operative and the Romanian Government.

A parallel process was one of increasing self-confidence and unity amongst the Ceylonese left-wing. In the parliament they were in the opposition. On May Day 1963 the three main left parties (LSSP, CP and MEP) held a massive joint rally. That was followed by the launching of United Front on 12 August, the tenth anniversary of the 1953 Hartal. The front launched agitations on issues like bring down the prices of essential commodities, leading it to represent an immediate threat to the governance of SLFP. The SLFP began to offer the left parties ministerial posts and worked intensively to break the unity of ULF.

In 1964, Vivienne was elected as MP for the Borella Electoral District. During the electoral race, she ran against Mrs. Kamala de Silva, the widow of W. D. de Silva. After her victory as part of the United Left Front, Vivienne was quoted as having said "Only the ULF and the UNP" by the Ceylon Daily News, 20 January 1964. In her concession speech, Kamala wrote about Vivienne:

"She played a role of a friend in need, in the hour of my despair and gradually matured into my most formidable opponent."

— Observer, 21st January 1964.

== Growth of the Lanka Sama Samaja Party ==
From the late 1940s to 1960s, the Lanka Sama Samaja Party served as the opposition Party in Sri Lanka, whilst being recognised as the Sri Lankan wing of the Fourth International, an organisation

Interview with Michael Roberts – archived at the University of Adelaide
- 1967 interview to Michael Roberts
- Interview with Michael Roberts (Tape 1) Speakers: Vivienne Goonewardene (Speech).
- Interview with Michael Roberts (Tape 2) Speakers: Vivienne Goonewardene (Speech).

characterised by Trotskyism and Anti-Stalinism. Through this, the party, led by Goonewardene, attempted to reform the former British Colony of Ceylon into a socialist republic by nationalising organisations in the banking, education, industry, media, and trade sectors. In 1959, despite being one of the largest landowners in Sri Lanka through inheritance, Vivienne and Leslie fought for the re-introduction of inheritance tax to the country, despite the opposition of wealthy established parliamentarians. Their party also introduced a limit on the number of houses one could own. This led to them giving away multiple properties to the renters, while Sirimavo Bandaranaike transferred properties to other relatives.

With its increased popularity, the LSSP was looking to grow. In 1964, the party held a conference in which the majority of delegates nominated the classification of the Sri Lanka Freedom Party (SLFP), a petty bourgeois party, leaving the prospects of a coalition with it. A group led by Edmund Samarakkody and Bala Tampoe, split from Goonewardene's party to form the Revolutionary Lanka Sama Samaja Party. Later in 1964, the LSSP, with the exception of Leslie and Colvin de Silva, led a coalition with Sirimavo Bandaranaike, allowing her to become the first female prime minister in modern world history. This principal change led to the LSSP being expelled from the Fourth International, with the Revolutionary Lanka Sama Samaja Party taking its place. Following the election, Leslie alongside Colvin R. de Silva declined to accept cabinet office. Vivienne, however, believed she could have the most impact as Secretary of Home Affairs, so took up the role.

The coalition government fell in 1965 due to the desertion of several members. However, the number of votes won by the LSSP increased at the general election held that year. After the election, supporters of the party were subjected to a period of co-ordinated victimisation by the new seven-party coalition led by the UNP. In 1968, Goonewardene orchestrated the LSSP joining the SLFP and the Communist Party of Sri Lanka (CPSL) in a United Front. That year's joint May Day rally was said to be the biggest ever to take place in Sri Lanka.

=== Sirimavo Bandaranaike ===
For her role in politics, Goonewardene was viewed as the leading Leftist woman politician in Sri Lanka. She became good friends with Sirimavo Bandaranaike, the world's first female Head of State, and proceeded to attend multiple delegations with her. Vivienne and Sirimavo attended the World Conference on International Women's Year in Mexico City in 1975, where the United States Department of State noted Vivienne for her "Top place on a National level" and was said to be "depended upon to have something provocative to say in Mexico City".

== Foreign relations ==
Goonewardene was a prominent member on the non-aligned stage. As part of political delegations, she met with and knew well Jawaharlal Nehru, V. K. Krishna Menon, Josip Broz Tito, and was friends with Gamal Abdel Nasser. While in North Korea, Kim Il-sung has insisted on meeting her, leading to her missing of her connecting flight to the USSR. Goonewardene remained a staunch supporter of the Palestinians in the Arab–Israeli conflict and was critical of the Middle East diplomacy sponsored by the United States. She headed the Committee for Solidarity with Palestine, as well as the Arab-Ceylon Solidarity Group.

== Later politics and government (1970-1977) ==
By 1970, Leslie and Vivienne believed that they could implement his views best through the SLFP coalition and joined the SLFP-led United Front government. That year, the United Front, made up of the LSSP, was elected to power in landslide. The LSSP had 18 MPs in the House of Representatives. Goonewardene became Junior Minister of Health. By July, she had worked to convene a Constitutional Assembly to replace the British-drafted constitution with one drafted by the Ceylonese. Policies requiring that permanent secretaries in the government ministries have expertise in their division were introduced. For example, those serving in the Ministry of Housing had to be trained engineers, and those serving in the Ministry of Health, medical practitioners. All government employees were allowed to join Workers Councils and at the local level, People's Committees were established to allow input from the population at large on government administration; this was brought from the LSSP management structure. The changes were intended to remove elements of British colonisation and foreign influence from the country's institutions.

== Continued activism (1977-1994) ==
After Goonewardene had left the main political ring, she remained an active part of the Sri Lankan feminist movement and politics. She often led demonstrations on International Women's Day. This later led to a landmark Supreme Court ruling on police brutality. As well as this, she also chaired multiple unions and was remained a leader of the Committee for Solidarity with Palestine.

== Death and legacy ==
Vivienne died on 3 October in Colombo in 1996 following a heart attack few months before her 80th birthday celebrations which saw guests ranging from multiple past and present Sri Lankan presidents and prime ministers, alongside an envoy from Cuba. She was mourned by all on the Left and there was a week of mourning announced. The funeral of Goonewardene took place at Borella Kanatte, and there was a kilometre long funeral procession via motorcade, attended by tens of thousands of onlookers. It had been proposed that her remains be displayed in Independence Square, however this idea was not possible, as Vivienne had wished for her remains to be cremated within 36 hours of her death. The remains were displayed at the Colombo Town Hall, and respects were paid to Vivienne Goonewardene by President Chandrika Kumaratunga.

Vivienne Goonewardene fought for the rights and welfare of all

— President Chandrika Kumaratunga

Vivienne was designated as the first female National Hero of Sri Lanka after her death and was featured on multiple postal stamps; she, and the other National Heroes are celebrated each year on the national holiday of Independence Day. She remains the only female National Hero. She is cited, to this day, as one of the greatest Sri-Lankan women of all time for her contributions to feminism, and the Sri Lankan independence movement.

=== Hundredth anniversary celebrations ===
Vivienne was widely celebrated in 2016 on the hundredth anniversary of her birth. The celebrations were attended by the president, Mahinda Rajapaksa.

== See also ==
- List of political families in Sri Lanka
