= Ratnapala =

Ratnapala may refer to:

- Ratna Pala, 10th century Indian king
- Ratnapala (Chahamana dynasty), 12th century Indian king
- Suri Ratnapala, Australian academic
