= Social security in Sri Lanka =

Welfare payments provided by the Sri Lankan Government

Social security in Sri Lanka, refers to a system of social welfare payments provided by Sri Lankan Government to eligible Sri Lankan citizens, permanent residents, and limited international visitors, as well as other benefits for workers protected by law. The welfare state of Sri Lanka began to evolve in the 1930s through to the 1970s, and comprises expenditures by the government of Sri Lanka intended to improve health, education, employment and social security. The Sri Lankan system has been classified as a liberal welfare state system.

== History ==
Historically the social protection needs were met by the immediate family, the extended family, and the community, which were augmented by a formal system of social security, modelled on the welfare state approach adopted in the West. In 1901, a mandatory pension scheme for civil servants was established. The 1930s saw the effects of the Great Depression and the Malaria Epidemic of 1934-35 on the poor, resulting in major social initiatives such as free education and health care by the State Council of Ceylon, followed by expansion of tax-funded hospital services and the Maternity Benefit Ordinance in 1939, giving maternity benefits for employed women. The Poor Law Relief, cash transfers to the poor were introduced in 1939 and with the onset of World War II, a food ration system was adopted by the government. Attempts by the post-independence government to withdraw this rice subsidy, due to an economic crisis, resulted in the 1953 Ceylonese Hartal. In the 1950s the establishment of a universal pension system was envisaged yet did not materialise. Although some private provident funds existed, the Employees' Provident Fund Act No 15 of 1958 established the Employees' Provident Fund (EPF) for all private sector workers. A slowdown in economic growth and increasing government deficits in the 1960s resulted in economic reforms and changes to the social policy leading the cuts in social expenditure in the 1970s. A food-stamp scheme, school mid-day meal programme and grants for the poor were later introduced. The EPF was further supplemented by the Employees' Trust Fund in 1981. In 1989, the Jana Saviya poverty alleviation programme was implemented.

== Social security programs ==
Social security benefits are administered by the Department of Social Services. As of 2022, they include:

- Aswesuma Allowance - for transitional, vulnerable, poor, and extremely poor families. The Aswesuma Welfare Beneficiary Programme, or more commonly known as Aswesuma, is a social security program that delivers a range of government payments and services for transitional, vulnerable, poor, and extremely poor families. As of 2025, payments were being made to 1,737,141 eligible families. Aswesuma payments were made in addition to social security payments made for 580,944 adults over the age of 70 in eligible families.
- Samurdhi Allowance - for low-income families.
- Pregnant Mother's Allowance
- Elderly, Disabled, and Kidney patients Allowance
- Mahapola Scholarship

== Legal framework ==
Social security payments and other benefits are made available under the following acts of parliament:

- Employees' Provident Fund Act No 15 of 1958
- Farmers Pension and Social Security Benefit Scheme Act No 12 of 1987
- Sri Lanka Social Security Board Act No 17 of 1996

== See also ==
- Economic history
- Welfare
- Social safety net
- The Susso - slang for welfare in the Great Depression.
- Welfare reform
- Unemployment benefits
