= International cricket in 1946–47 =

International cricket season

The 1946–47 international cricket season was from September 1946 to April 1947.

== Season overview ==
International tours
Start date	Home team	Away team	Results [Matches]			
Start date	Home team	Away team	Test	ODI	FC	LA
29 November 1946	Australia	England	3–0 [5]	—	—	—
2 February 1947	India	Ceylon	—	—	0–1 [1]	—
21 March 1947	New Zealand	England	0–0 [1]	—	—	—

== November ==
=== England in Australia ===
The Ashes Test series
No.	Date	Home captain	Away captain	Venue	Result
Test 279	29 Nov–4 December	Donald Bradman	Wally Hammond	The Gabba, Brisbane	Australia by an innings and 332 runs
Test 280	13–19 December	Donald Bradman	Wally Hammond	Sydney Cricket Ground, Sydney	Australia by an innings and 33 runs
Test 281	1–7 January	Donald Bradman	Wally Hammond	Melbourne Cricket Ground, Melbourne	Match drawn
Test 282	31 Jan–6 February	Donald Bradman	Wally Hammond	Adelaide Oval, Adelaide	Match drawn
Test 283	28 Feb–5 March	Donald Bradman	Wally Hammond	Sydney Cricket Ground, Sydney	Australia by 5 wickets

== February ==
=== Ceylon in India ===
Three-day Match
No.	Date	Home captain	Away captain	Venue	Result
Match	2–4 February	Mahadevan Sathasivam	M. J. Gopalan	Madras Cricket Club Ground, Madras	Ceylon CA by an innings and 114 runs

== March ==
=== England in New Zealand ===
One-off Test Match
No.	Date	Home captain	Away captain	Venue	Result
Test 284	21–25 March	Walter Hadlee	Wally Hammond	Lancaster Park, Christchurch	Match drawn
