= R. B. Lenora =

Ceylonese physician and politician (1906–?)

Robolage Barnes Lenora (30 June 1906–?) was a Ceylonese physician and politician. He served as Principle of the Institute of Indigenous Medicine from 1952 to 1965. He was elected from the Borella electorate from the United National Party to the House of Representatives defeating Dr Danister de Silva in the 1960 March general elections, but was defeated by Dr Danister de Silva in the 1960 July general elections. He contested the seat again in 1964 in a by election, but was defeated by Vivienne Goonewardena. Later he was appointed to the Senate of Ceylon, where he presented the bill incorporating the Ceylon College of Physicians.
