= Borella Electoral District =

Electoral district of Sri Lanka

Borella electoral district was an electoral district of Sri Lanka between March 1960 and February 1989. The district was named after the town of Borella in Colombo District, Western Province. The 1978 Constitution of Sri Lanka introduced the proportional representation electoral system for electing members of Parliament. The existing 160 mainly single-member electoral districts were replaced with 22 multi-member electoral districts. Borella electoral district was replaced by the Colombo multi-member electoral district at the 1989 general elections.

== Members of Parliament ==
Key

UNP SLFP LSSP

| Election | Member | Party | Term |
|---|---|---|---|
| 1960 (March) | R. B. Lenora | United National Party | 1960 |
| 1960 (July) | W. Danister de Silva | Sri Lanka Freedom Party | 1960-64 |
| 1964 (by-election) | Vivienne Goonewardena | Lanka Sama Samaja Party | 1964-65 |
| 1965 | M. H. Mohamed | United National Party | 1965-70 |
| 1970 | Kusala Abhayawardana | Lanka Sama Samaja Party | 1970-77 |
| 1977 | M. H. Mohamed | United National Party | 1977-89 |

== Elections ==
=== 1960 (March) Parliamentary General Election ===
Results of the 4th parliamentary election held on 19 March 1960:

| Candidate | Party | Symbol | Votes | % |
|---|---|---|---|---|
| R. B. Lenora | United National Party | Elephant | 7,261 | 35.20 |
| W. Danister de Silva | Sri Lanka Freedom Party | Hand | 5,502 | 26.67 |
| H. A. de S. Gunasekera | | Key | 3,914 | 18.96 |
| M. S. Abu Bakr | | Cartwheel | 3,748 | 18.17 |
| B.H.S. Jayawardena | | Eye | 1,656 | 8.03 |
| H. L. Perera | | Pair of Scales | - | |
| Valid Votes | | | 20,557 | 99.66 |
| Rejected Votes | | | 70 | 0.34 |
| Total Polled | | | 20,627 | 100.00 |
| Registered Electors | | | 28,423 | |
| Turnout | | | | 72.57 |

=== 1960 (July) Parliamentary General Election ===
Results of the 5th parliamentary election held on 20 July 1960:

| Candidate | Party | Symbol | Votes | % |
|---|---|---|---|---|
| W. Danister de Silva | Sri Lanka Freedom Party | Hand | 11,409 | 56.40 |
| R. B. Lenora | United National Party | Elephant | 8,690 | 42.96 |
| Valid Votes | | | 20,099 | 99.37 |
| Rejected Votes | | | 128 | 0.63 |
| Total Polled | | | 20,227 | 100.00 |
| Registered Electors | | | 28,423 | |
| Turnout | | | | 71.16 |

=== 1964 Parliamentary By Election ===
Results of the Ceylonese parliamentary by-election, held on 18 January 1964:

| Candidate | Party | Symbol | Votes | % |
|---|---|---|---|---|
| Vivienne Goonewardena | Lanka Sama Samaja Party | Key | 12,592 | 47.96 |
| R. B. Lenora | United National Party | Elephant | 12,106 | 46.11 |
| Kamala de Silva | Sri Lanka Freedom Party | Hand | 1,356 | 5.16 |
| J. N. Ranatunga | | Spoon | 156 | 0.59 |
| D. N. Samarakoon | | Aeroplane | 47 | 0.18 |
| Valid Votes | | | 26,194 | 99.76 |
| Rejected Votes | | | 63 | 0.24 |
| Total Polled | | | 26,257 | 100.00 |
| Registered Electors | | | 28,423 | |
| Turnout | | | | 92.38 |

=== 1965 Parliamentary General Election ===
Results of the 6th parliamentary election held on 22 March 1965:

| Candidate | Party | Symbol | Votes | % |
|---|---|---|---|---|
| M. H. Mohamed | United National Party | Elephant | 14,910 | 51.70 |
| Vivienne Goonewardena | Lanka Sama Samaja Party | Key | 13,218 | 45.83 |
| P. de Z. Sri Gunawardena | | Cartwheel | 374 | 1.30 |
| D. C. Abeyewardena | | Umbrella | 100 | 0.35 |
| Valid Votes | | | 28,602 | 99.17 |
| Rejected Votes | | | 238 | 0.83 |
| Total Polled | | | 28,840 | 100.00 |
| Registered Electors | | | 37,542 | |
| Turnout | | | | 76.82 |

=== 1970 Parliamentary General Election ===
Results of the 7th parliamentary election held on 27 May 1970:

| Candidate | Party | Symbol | Votes | % |
|---|---|---|---|---|
| Kusala Abhayawardana | Lanka Sama Samaja Party | Key | 16,421 | 50.05 |
| M. H. Mohamed | United National Party | Elephant | 15,829 | 48.24 |
| M. A. Mansoor | | Pair of Scales | 510 | 1.55 |
| Valid Votes | | | 32,760 | 99.85 |
| Rejected Votes | | | 50 | 0.15 |
| Total Polled | | | 32,810 | 100.00 |
| Registered Electors | | | 42,849 | |
| Turnout | | | | 76.57 |

=== 1977 Parliamentary General Election ===
Results of the 8th parliamentary election held on 21 July 1977:

| Candidate | Party | Symbol | Votes | % |
|---|---|---|---|---|
| M. H. Mohamed | United National Party | Elephant | 19,824 | 61.63 |
| B. T. Douglas Perera | Sri Lanka Freedom Party | Hand | 9,812 | 30.50 |
| Dharmasena de Silva Kurukulasuriya | Lanka Sama Samaja Party | Key | 2,304 | 7.16 |
| A. G. Guruge | | Flower | 88 | 0.27 |
| Valid Votes | | | 32,028 | 99.57 |
| Rejected Votes | | | 139 | 0.43 |
| Total Polled | | | 32,167 | 100.00 |
| Registered Electors | | | 41,634 | |
| Turnout | | | | 77.26 |
