= Dehiwala-Mount Lavinia Electoral District =

Electoral district of Sri Lanka

Dehiwala-Mount Lavinia electoral district, later renamed Dehiwala was an electoral district of Sri Lanka between March 1960 and February 1989. The district was named after the city of Dehiwala-Mount Lavinia in Colombo District, Western Province. The 1978 Constitution of Sri Lanka introduced the proportional representation electoral system for electing members of Parliament. The existing 160 mainly single-member electoral districts were replaced with 22 multi-member electoral districts. Dehiwala-Mount Lavinia electoral district was replaced by the Colombo multi-member electoral district at the 1989 general elections.

== Members of Parliament ==
Key

Independent SLFP UNP

Election	Member	Party	Term
1960 (March)	S. de Silva Jayasinghe	UNP	1960-1960
1960 (July)	Colvin R. de Silva	LSSP	1960-1965
1965	S. de Silva Jayasinghe	UNP	1965-1970
1970	Vivienne Goonewardena	LSSP	1970-1977
1977	S. de Silva Jayasinghe	UNP	1977-1977
1977 (by election)	Sunethra Ranasinghe	UNP	1977-1989

== Elections ==
=== 1960 (March) Parliamentary General Election ===
Results of the 4th parliamentary election held on 19 March 1960 for the district:

Candidate	Party	Symbol	Votes	%
S. de Silva Jayasinghe		Elephant	12,971	40.88
Colvin R. de Silva		Key	8,599	27.10
Andrew Fernando		Hand	6,378	20.10
K. K. A. E. Britto		Star	3,222	10.15
T. D. L. Aponso		Umbrella	420	1.32
Valid Votes			31,590	99.56
Rejected Votes			140	0.44
Total Polled			31,730	100.00
Registered Electors			43,172	
Turnout				73.50

=== 1960 (July) Parliamentary General Election ===
Results of the 5th parliamentary election held on 20 July 1960 for the district:

Candidate	Party	Symbol	Votes	%
Colvin R. de Silva		Key	16,002	51.36
S. de Silva Jayasinghe		Elephant	14,892	47.80
D. B. de S. Jayawardena		Rabbit	156	0.50
Valid Votes			31,050	99.65
Rejected Votes			108	0.35
Total Polled			31,158	100.00
Registered Electors			43,172	
Turnout				72.17

=== 1965 Parliamentary General Election ===
Results of the 6th parliamentary election held on 22 March 1965 for the district:

Candidate	Party	Symbol	Votes	%
S. de Silva Jayasinghe		Elephant	24,652	53.19
Colvin R. de Silva		Key	21,363	46.10
Somadasa Siriwardhana		Cartwheel	248	0.54
Valid Votes			46,263	99.83
Rejected Votes			81	0.17
Total Polled			46,344	100.00
Registered Electors			56,366	
Turnout				82.22

=== 1970 Parliamentary General Election ===
Results of the 7th parliamentary election held on 27 May 1970 for the district:

Candidate	Party	Symbol	Votes	%
Vivienne Goonewardena		Key	29,430	51.63
S. de Silva Jayasinghe		Elephant	27,463	48.18
Valid Votes			56,893	98.81
Rejected Votes			106	0.19
Total Polled			56,999	100.00
Registered Electors			70,236	
Turnout				81.15

=== 1977 Parliamentary General Election ===
Results of the 8th parliamentary election held on 21 July 1977 for the district:

Candidate	Party	Symbol	Votes	%
S. de Silva Jayasinghe	United National Party	Elephant	22,364	61.44
Vithanage Don Alfred Perera	Sri Lanka Freedom Party	Hand	9,996	27.46
Ananda Premasinghe	Lanka Sama Samaja Party	Key	3,578	9.83
T. Upali Cooray		Bell	402	1.10
Valid Votes			36,340	99.84
Rejected Votes			60	0.17
Total Polled			36,400	100.00
Registered Electors			45,693	
Turnout				79.66

=== 1977 Parliamentary By Election ===
Results of the Ceylonese parliamentary by-election, held on 11 November 1977:

Candidate	Party	Symbol	Votes	%
Sunethra Rupasinghe	United National Party	Elephant	18,279	62.75
Vithanage Don Alfred Perera	Sri Lanka Freedom Party	Hand	7,795	26.76
Ananda Premasinghe	Lanka Sama Samaja Party	Key	2,753	9.45
Asoka Atapattu		Lamp	1,386	4.76
Valid Votes			28,965	99.44
Rejected Votes			163	0.56
Total Polled			29,128	100.00
Registered Electors			45,693	
Turnout				63.75
