= Étienne Drioton =

French archaeologist (1889–1961)

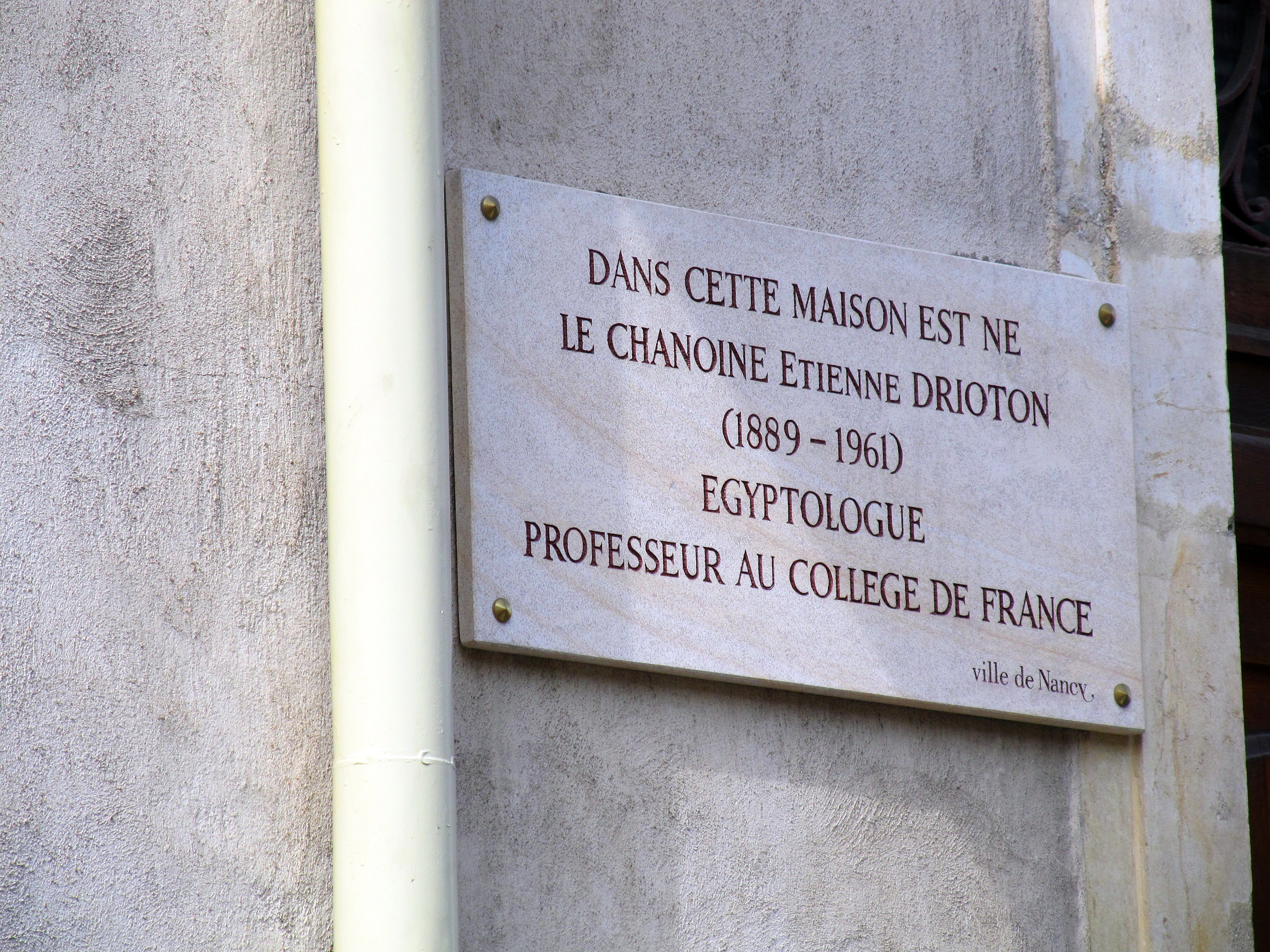
Commemorative plaque in Nancy

Étienne Marie Felix Drioton (21 November 1889 – 17 January 1961) was a French Egyptologist, archaeologist, and Catholic canon. He was born in Nancy and died in Montgeron.

Picture of Étienne Drioton

== Biography ==
Etienne Drioton, his father, was originally from Burgundy where the family founded a business in Dijon in 1742 which developed along three axes: manufacture of church bronzes, manufacture of church ornaments and religious bookstore. Lawyer at the Court of Nancy, a profession he probably never exercised, he married on December 19, 1888, in Nancy with Félicie Moitrier, a native of Lorquin; both run a religious bookstore selling religious ornaments at n°4, quai Claude le Lorrain, while their new home and their clothing workshop are at n°6, rue Saint Antoine. Then, they will open a second store, Place Stanislas, at the corner of rue Héré, a store open from 1902 to 1971 (trade under the current name of Daum). Later, they will live in Villers les Nancy, 78. Early in life he assisted as Conservative Deputy in the Department of Egyptian antiquities at the Louvre in Paris; in 1936 he became Director General of Antiquities of Egypt in the Egyptian Museum at Cairo; finally becoming Head Curator back at the Louvre in 1957. He deciphered hieroglyphic writings, and later laid the foundations of Coptic archaeology. Drioton authored numerous books, and has been considered the greatest Egyptologist of all time.

=== Nag Hammadi Codices ===
When a cache of over a dozen codices written in ancient Coptic were discovered near Nag Hammadi, Egypt, in 1945 (they became known as the Nag Hammadi codices), underworld characters began to acquire them, selling them on the black market. Fearful that the precious manuscripts would be scattered and never recovered, the Egyptian government sent Drioton to acquire as much of the collection as he could.

Cairo antiquities dealer Phokion J. Tanos had acquired most of the collection from these outlaws, but had already sold one codex to Maria Dattari, a private antiquities collector in Cairo. Dattari offered the collection to the Egyptian government for £71,000+, which was negotiated down to £45,000.

An antiquities law was quickly modified to include the artifacts, which made both the Tano and Dattari collections the legal property of the Egyptian government. At that time, Drioton took immediate possession of them, and ordered them sequestered until a proper course of action could be determined by the courts.

The publishing in 1949 of the inventory (Codices I to XII) of the "Tano collection" did not include Codex III, since it was already in the possession of the Coptic Museum at that time. But it was the quick thinking and decisive action of Étienne Drioton that led to the preservation and availability of these literary artifacts to scholars today.

=== Tell el Amarna Collection ===
As with many other prominent Egyptologists in the field, a solid friendship developed between Drioton and M. A. Mansoor, who had a legal license to buy and sell antiquities. Mansoor decided to show his growing Tell el Amarna Collection of sculptures to Drioton.

Afterward, the Faculty of Arts of the University of Cairo purchased, from Mansoor, a bas-relief that was presented to Farouk on the occasion of his accession to the throne of Egypt. The relief, measuring roughly eleven by eight inches, depicts Akhenaten enthroned, his feet resting on a stool, wearing a curly wig with hanging flaps, and a rather large uraeus. Also Farouk's mother had purchased for Farouk's birthday another quite handsome statuette of a youthful princess, measuring approximately nine inches in height.

But once publicity began to surface, along with pictures of the works of art, rumors began to circulate in Cairo that the entire group consisted of forgeries. Egyptologists and art historians were interviewed, generating articles describing the beauty of the artifacts and their importance in the history of ancient Egyptian art.

Two Cairo antique dealers, Maurice Nahman and Phocion J. Tano, fearful perhaps of losing business, quickly spread rumors that the Mansoor Amarna objects were spurious. All such criticisms were dismissed by Farouk, the Egyptologists, and Mansoor, as being generated by ignorance and jealousy.

In the end, the artifacts were authenticated, and Mansoor and Drioton were vindicated as experts in the field of ancient Egyptian Art. In a letter of support for Drioton's expertise in the field of Egyptian art, Edmond Mansoor referred to Canon Drioton as a "giant" of Egyptology, further asserting that he was one of the greatest Egyptologists of this century. (A letter by Edmond Mansoor)

Drioton was appointed an Officier of the Légion d'honneur.

== Legacy ==
Abbé Drioton has been cited as an authority on Egyptian matters by a number of authors in the field of Egyptology. With the closing of the twentieth century, (Abbé) Étienne Drioton has thus emerged as one of the greatest Egyptologists of that century.

== Bibliography ==
- Cours de grammaire égyptienne (1922).
- Ce que l'on sait du théâtre égyptien (Éditions de la Revue du Caire), Cairo, 1925.
- Drioton, & Vandier, Les Peuples de l'Orient Méditerranéen : l'Égypte, Paris, 1938.
- Le Musée Égyptien. Souvenir de la visite de Son Altesse Impériale le Prince Héritier d'Iran (Service des Antiquités de l'Égypte), Cairo, 1939.
- Visite à Thèbes. Souvenir de la visite de Son Altesse Impériale le Prince Héritier d'Iran (Service des Antiquités de l'Égypte), Cairo, 1939.
- Drioton, Étienne, & Lauer, Jean-Philippe, "The monuments of Zoser: Sakkarah," (Imprimerie de l'Institut Français d'Archéologie Orientale), Cairo, 1939.
- Croyances et coutumes funéraires de l'ancienne Égypte, Cairo, 1943.
- Les fêtes égyptiennes (Éditions de la Revue du Caire), Cairo, 1944.
- Le jugement des âmes dans l'ancienne Égypte (Édition de la Revue du Caire), Cairo, 1949.
- "Egyptian Art," Golden Griffin Books, 1951.
- L'Égypte (Les peuples de l'Orient méditerranéen II), Presses Universitaires de France, 1952.
- L'Égypte pharaonique (1959).
