= International cricket in 1945–46 =

International cricket season

The 1945–46 international cricket season was from September 1945 to April 1946.

== Season overview ==
International tours
Start date	Home team	Away team	Results [Matches]			
Start date	Home team	Away team	Test	ODI	FC	LA
10 November 1945	India	Australia	—	—	1–0 [3]	—
14 December 1945	Ceylon	Australia	—	—	0–1 [1]	—
29 March 1946	New Zealand	Australia	0–1 [1]	—	—	—

== November ==
=== Australia in India ===
Unofficial Test Series
No.	Date	Home captain	Away captain	Venue	Result
Match	10–13 November	Vijay Merchant	Lindsay Hassett	Brabourne Stadium, Bombay	Match drawn
Match	25–28 November	Vijay Merchant	Lindsay Hassett	Eden Gardens, Calcutta	Match drawn
Match	7–10 December	Vijay Merchant	Lindsay Hassett	Madras Cricket Club Ground, Madras	India by 6 wickets

== December ==
=== Australia in Ceylon ===
Three-day Match
No.	Date	Home captain	Away captain	Venue	Result
Match	14–15 December	Mahadevan Sathasivam	Lindsay Hassett	Colombo Oval, Colombo	Australian Services by an innings and 44 runs

== March ==
=== Australia in New Zealand ===
One-off Test Match
No.	Date	Home captain	Away captain	Venue	Result
Test 275	29–30 March	Walter Hadlee	Bill Brown	Basin Reserve, Wellington	Australia by an innings and 103 runs
