= Wellawatte-Galkissa Electoral District =

Electoral district of Sri Lanka

Wellawatte-Galkissa electoral district was an electoral district of Sri Lanka between August 1947 and March 1960. The district was named after the suburbs of Wellawatte and Galkissa (Dehiwala-Mount Lavinia) in Colombo, Colombo District, Western Province.

== Members of Parliament ==
Key

Independent Bolshevik–Leninist Party LSSP UNP

Election	Member	Party	Term
1947	Colvin R. de Silva	Bolshevik–Leninist Party	1947-1952
1952	S. de Silva Jayasinghe	United National Party	1952-1956
1956	Colvin R. de Silva	Lanka Sama Samaja Party	1956-1960

== Elections ==
=== 1947 Parliamentary General Election ===
Results of the 1st parliamentary election held between 23 August 1947 and 20 September 1947 for the district:

Candidate	Party	Symbol	Votes	%
Colvin R. de Silva	Bolshevik–Leninist Party	Key	11,606	53.36
Gilbert Perera		Cart Wheel	4,170	19.17
L. V. Gooneratne		Star	4,121	18.95
Amaradasa Ratnapala		Pair of Scales	1,327	6.10
S. J. F. D. Bandaranaike		Lamp	224	1.03
A. P. de Zoysa		Hand	103	0.47
Thomas de Silva		Umbrella	72	0.33
Valid Votes			21,623	99.42
Rejected Votes			127	0.58
Total Polled			21,750	100.00
Registered Electors			38,664	
Turnout				56.25

=== 1952 Parliamentary General Election ===
Results of the 2nd parliamentary election held between 24 May 1952 and 30 May 1952 for the district:

Candidate	Party	Symbol	Votes	%
S. de Silva Jayasinghe	United National Party	Elephant	16,388	57.00
Colvin R. de Silva	Lanka Sama Samaja Party	Key	11,888	41.35
Richard Gotabhaya Senanayake		Umbrella	228	0.79
Valid Votes			28,504	99.15
Rejected Votes			245	0.85
Total Polled			28,749	100.00
Registered Electors			43,276	
Turnout				66.43

=== 1956 Parliamentary General Election ===
Results of the 3rd parliamentary election held between 5 April 1956 and 10 April 1956 for the district:

Candidate	Party	Symbol	Votes	%
Colvin R. de Silva	Lanka Sama Samaja Party	Key	16,782	43.06
S. de Silva Jayasinghe	United National Party	Elephant	11,806	30.29
L. V. Gooneratne		Hand	10,259	26.33
Valid Votes			38,847	99.68
Rejected Votes			124	0.32
Total Polled			38,971	100.00
Registered Electors			56,165	
Turnout				69.39
