= Walisinghe Harischandra =

Sri Lankan Buddhist revivalist and author (1876-1913)

Walisinghe Harischandra වලිසිංහ හරිශ්චන්ද්‍ර
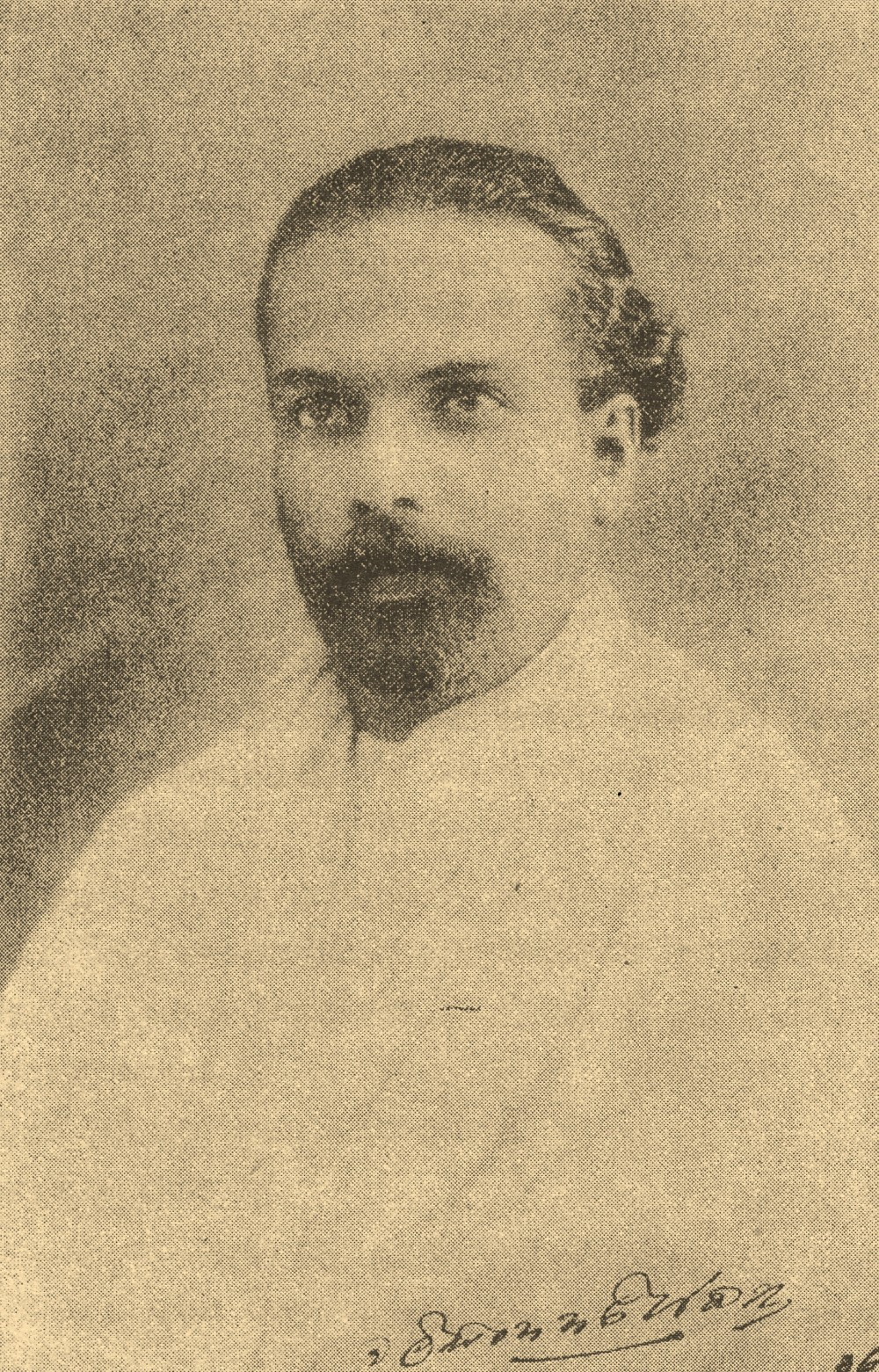
- Walisinghe Harischandra
- Born: 9 July 1876; Negambo, Ceylon
- Died: 13 September 1913 (aged 37); Colombo, Ceylon
- Other names: Edward de Silva Walisinghe
- Education: St. Mary's College, Negombo; Wesley College, Colombo; Ceylon Law College
- Known for: Revival of Buddhism; Sri Lankan Independence Movement; Temperance Movement

Brahmachari Walisinghe Harischandra (Sinhala:බ්‍රහ්මචාරී වලිසිංහ හරිශ්චන්ද්‍ර; 9 July 1876 – 13 September 1913 ) was a social reformer, historian, author and revivalist of Sri Lankan Buddhism. He was a follower of Anagarika Dharmapala, who gave leadership to the Buddhist revivalist movement, after the lead given by Colonel Henry Steel Olcott. Walisinghe Harischandra is also regarded as the saviour of the citadel of Buddhism in Sri Lanka, Anuradhapura.

== Biography ==
Walisinghe Harischandra was born to the family of Walisinghe Hendrick de Silva and Pehandi Marthnanda de Silva Gunasekera in Negombo on 9 July 1876. His birth name was Edward de Silva. Edward started his primary education under a Buddhist scholar monk and then attended St. Mary's College, Negombo. Later he was entrusted to a Lawyer uncle in Colombo, to continue his studies in English and Law. He was a student of Wesley College, Colombo from 1889 to 1895. After the school education, he attended the Ceylon Law College.

Edward developed a keen interest in Buddhism and gradually began working as a true nationalist, while he was a Law student at Ceylon Law College. He changed his name to E. de S. Walisinghe and started teaching at the Sunday Dhamma school at Ananda College, Colombo. Sri Lanka was then a British colony known as Ceylon. Young E. de S. Walisinghe gave up his legal career and adopted the name Walisinghe Harischandra. He decided to be a Brahmacharya, which meant he would remain a bachelor, devoting his time to religious and national work. He believed that he would be able to serve his motherland in a more meaningful manner by getting involved in nationalist and religious activities.

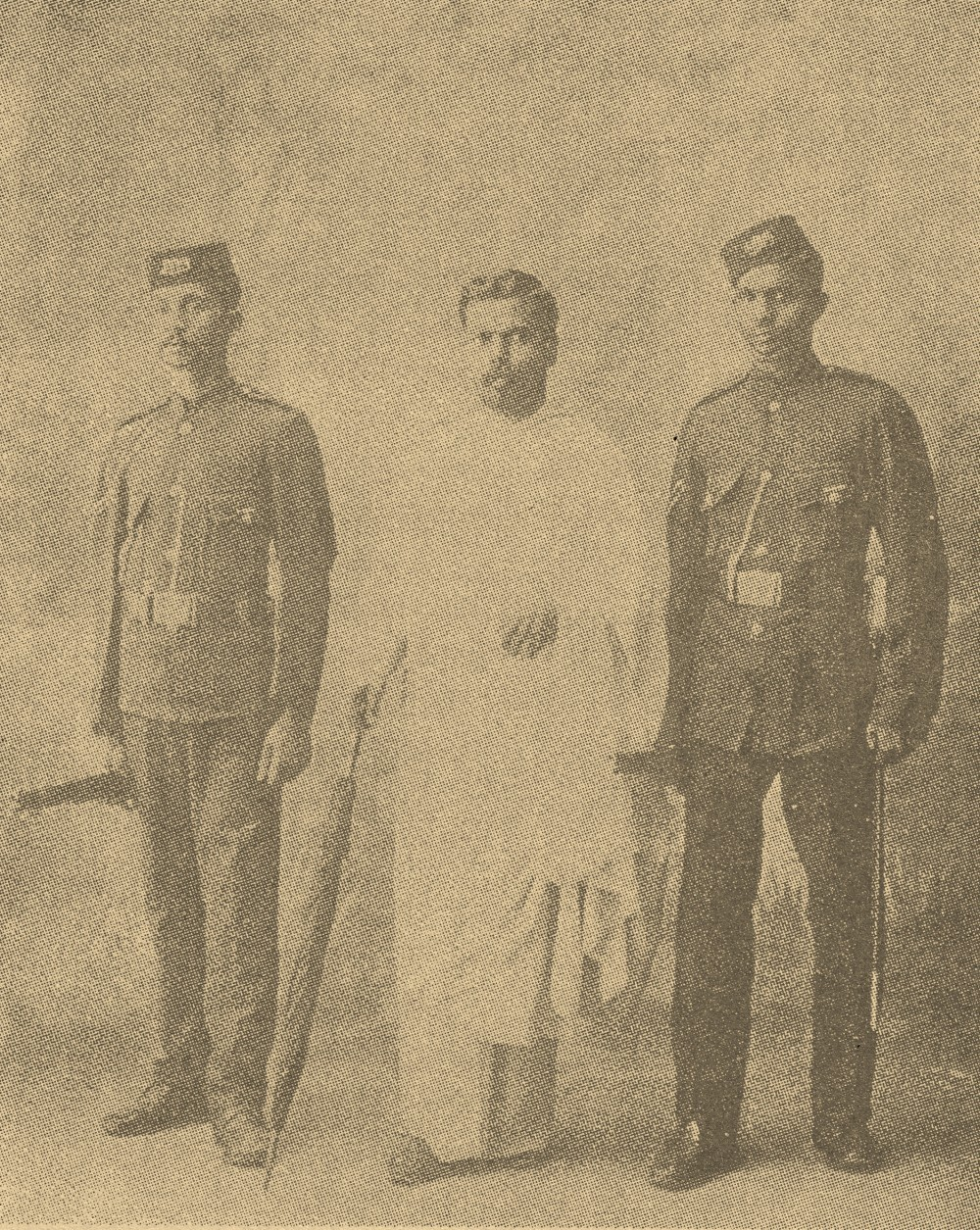
Brahmachari after taken into the Police Custody by the British in 1903.

Walisinghe Harischandra joined the Mahabodhi Society, which had been established by Anagarika Dharmapala, a prominent figure of Sri Lankan (Sinhala) Buddhist nationalist movement. He worked first as the assistant secretary and later as the Secretary of Mahabodhi Society. In 1899 he went across to India and was involved in the construction of the Maha Bodhi Vihara in Sanchi. He spent some time in India and participated in the campaign 'Save Buddhagaya'.

Walisinghe Harischandra was also interested in Temperance Work and addressed many meetings of the Sri Lankan temperance society. By constantly addressing various meetings, he soon became a powerful orator. He wrote many books in the areas of Sri Lankan history and Buddhism and was also the editor of the magazine 'Mahabodhi'. He was the prominent figure of making the ancient city of Anuradhapura, a sacred city and was the founder of the Ruvanveli Dagoba Improvement Society. He did a great service for the restoration of ancient Buddhist shrines in Anuradhapura and Mihintale.

He was moved by the sordid condition of Anuradhapura, the ancient capital of Lanka. Among the business premises that had come up, there were meat stalls and liquor bars in close proximity to the Buddhist shrines. He made up his mind to stop this desecration and published a booklet named, the Sacred City of Anuradhapura and sent a copy to King George V. In this book he pointed out that the Crown representatives despoiled Buddhist Holy places and appealed to him to protect their sanctity. Before he died, he was able to hear that his request had been granted.

Walisinghe Harischandra kept a diary of daily activities making notes regularly. Among the entries towards the latter part of his life was one on 'The best die young'. Walisinghe Harischandra died on 13 September 1913 after a short illness. He died at relatively young age of 37, with the satisfaction of being able to be a part of the revival of Buddhism in Sri Lanka. Brahmachari Walisinghe Harischandra is regarded as a National Hero of Sri Lanka.

== Survey of writings ==
Walisinghe Harischandra wrote and published a considerable number of books. Most of his books were written in English and Sinhala languages. Description of the Sacred City of Anuradhapura, Great Story of King Dutugemunu, Lumbini, Mahabodhi, The Significance of Jaya Sri Maha Bodhi and Life of King Devanampiyatissa are some examples for his written work. In his book The Sacred City of Anuradhapura, he included a section titled The Best Way to See the Ruins, to guide the newcomers to the city.
