= S. C. C. Anthony Pillai =

Politician and labor leader

S.C.C. Anthonypillai
- எஸ். சி. சி. அந்தோனிப்பிள்ளை

Member of the Lok Sabha
- In office 1957–1962
- Preceded by: Constituency created
- Succeeded by: P. Srinivasan
- Constituency: Madras North

Member of the Madras State Legislative Assembly
- In office 1952–1957
- Preceded by: Constituency created
- Constituency: Choolai

Personal details
- Born: Sebastian Cyril Constantine Anthony Pillai; 27 April 1914 Jaffna, Northern Province, British Ceylon (now Sri Lanka)
- Died: 16 August 2000 (aged 86) Chennai, Tamil Nadu, India
- Spouse: Caroline Anthonypillai
- Children: 4
- Education: Ceylon University College; King's College London
- Ethnicity: Tamil

Sebastian Cyril Constantine Anthony Pillai (27 April 1914 – 16 August 2000), also spelled S.C.C. Anthonypillai, was a Ceylonese-Indian trade unionist, politician and Member of Parliament.

== Early life and family ==
Anthony Pillai was born on 27 April 1914 in Jaffna in northern Ceylon. He was the son of S. Anthony Pillai. His family were Roman Catholics whose ancestors came from Tirunelveli District in India. Anthony Pillai was educated at St. Patrick's College, Jaffna. After school he studied history at the Ceylon University College. He later studied at King's College London where he was a member of the India League and a Marxist study group of Ceylonese students.

Anthony Pillai married Caroline Gunawardena, daughter of Don Jacolis Rupasinghe Gunawardena, in 1939. They had four sons (Mahendran, Ranjit, Nalin Ranjan and Suresh Kumar).

== Career ==
Anthony Pillai was one of the founding members of the Lanka Sama Samaja Party (LSSP) in 1935. He rejoined the LSSP after returning to Ceylon from the UK in 1938. The LSSP leadership had high hopes about Tony, as he was known, but as he could not speak Sinhala, the main language of Ceylon, LSSP leader Philip Gunawardena suggested that he get lessons from his sister Caroline. The pair fell in love and married.

The LSSP sent Anthony Pillai and Caroline to Nawalapitiya to organise Indian Tamil estate workers a LSSP union. This was dangerous work as the British plantation owners were known to use violence to suppress unions. When World War II broke out in September 1939 the LSSP opposed the "second imperialist war". The LSSP played a major role in a wave of strikes in 1939/40 and consequently it was proscribed in 1940 and its leaders Colvin R. de Silva, Philip Gunawardena, N. M. Perera and Edmund Samarakkody arrested in June 1940. However, Anthony Pillai, Caroline and her brother Robert Gunawardena continued to organise strikes by bus, harbour and granary workers during 1940-41.

In April 1942 the four LSSP leaders, aided by sympathetic prison guards, escaped from prison and whilst de Silva, Philip Gunawardena and Perera fled to India Samarakkody went into hiding in Ceylon. In July 1942 the bulk of LSSP members, including Anthony Pillai, clandestinely crossed over to India in fishing boats. Whilst most went to Bombay, Anthony Pillai and a few other LSSP members went to Madurai where they joined the Bolshevik–Leninist Party of India, Ceylon and Burma (BLPI). Anthony Pillai was a member of the BLPI's central committee from 1944 to 1948. When the Quit India Movement began in August 1942 Anthony Pillai and other BLPI members led the movement in Madurai.

Anthony Pillai moved to Madras in 1943 and, after the Quit India Movement had quietened, sent for Caroline and their two sons. He became leader of the Madras Labour Union in 1944. Anthony Pillai, his family and several Ceylonese BLPI members, including some who had fled Bombay, were living in a large, two-storey house at the Venus Colony in Teynampe. The group were still wanted by the police and as a result Anthony Pillai was living in disguise. Realising that this environment wasn't conducive to bring up a family, Caroline and their two sons returned to Ceylon. Anthony Pillai and other BLPI members then sought refuge in an outhouse behind Ambi’s Café but in 1944 they were recognised. The police arrested everyone at the refuge and Anthony Pillai and another Ceylonese BLPI member were sentenced to two years’ rigorous imprisonment for "possessing seditious literature".

After being released from Alipuram in 1946 Anthony Pillai returned to Ceylon. However, shortly afterwards the family returned to India when Anthony Pillai was invited back to take over the leadership of the Madras Labour Union (MLU). In early 1947 the MLU started preparing for strikes at the Buckingham and Carnatic Mills. As a result, Anthony Pillai was arrested on 10 March 1947 on government orders. Tens of thousands of workers took part in hartals and demonstrations demanding the release of Anthony Pillai and other union leaders. The government, fearing that workers may try to free Anthony Pillai, transferred him to a prison in remote Andhra. The MLU was banned on 9 June 1947, its assets seized and members arrested. The MLU was forced to abandon the strikes at the mills.

Anthony Pillai served as the union's president from 1946 to 1975 and also in 1983. He was a member of the All India Trade Union Congress' general council and the Workers' United Front's executive committee in 1947. He founded the Indian Overseas Bank Employees' Union in 1948 and served as its president. He was elected president of the Madras Port Trust Employees' Union in 1948. He was general-secretary and vice president of the All India Port and Dock Workers' Federation until 2000. He was president of the All India Transport Workers' Union, vice president of the Hind Mazdoor Sabha (1952 and 1960–74) and president of the Tamil Nadu Council of Hind Mazdoor Sabha (1957 and 1968). He was a trustee of the Chennai Port Trust from 1954 to 2000. He led several strikes at the Port of Madras. Anthony Pillai is believed to have led over 200 unions during his lifetime.

In 1948 the BLPI merged into the Socialist Party (SP) and Anthony Pillai joined the SP. He was a member of the Madras Municipal Corporation between 1948 and 1959. Anthony Pillai led the opposition to the SP's merger with the Kisan Mazdoor Praja Party, founding the breakaway Socialist Party (Loyalists) in 1952. Anthony Pillai represented Choolai in the Madras State Legislative Assembly between 1952 and 1957. He joined the Socialist Party (Lohia) in 1956. He represented Madras North in the Lok Sabha between 1957 and 1962. Anthony Pillai then formed the Tamilnad Socialist Labour Party which merged into the Tamil National Party (TNP) in 1962. In 1964 the TNP merged into the Indian National Congress (INC) and Anthony Pillai joined the INC. Anthony Pillai tried unsuccessfully to regain the Madras North at the 1967 Indian general election. When the INC split Anthony Pillai joined K. Kamaraj's Indian National Congress (Organisation).

Anthony Pillai died on 16 August 2000 of cardiac arrest at a private hospital in Chennai, India.
