= Dengue in Sri Lanka =

Mosquito-borne viral pandemic from 1989 onward

- Map of confirmed cases
- Disease: Dengue fever
- Pathogen: Dengue virus
- Location: Sri Lanka
- Date: 1989 – present (37 years)
- Confirmed cases: ▼31,162 (2020)
- Deaths: ▼35 (2020)
- Fatality rate: ▼0.11% (2020)

Dengue fever in Sri Lanka is now an endemic tropical disease. Dengue fever is caused by Dengue virus, first recorded in the 1960s. It is not a native disease in this island. Present-day dengue has become a major public health problem. Aedes aegypti and Aedes albopictus are both mosquito species native to Sri Lanka. However, the disease did not emerge until the early 1960s. Dengue was first serologically confirmed in the country in 1962. A Chikungunya outbreak followed in 1965. In the early 1970s, two types of dengue dominated in Sri Lanka: DENV-1 type1 and DENV-2 type 2. A total of 51 cases and 15 deaths were reported in 1965–1968. From 1989 onward, dengue fever has become endemic in Sri Lanka.

== Epidemiology ==
Dengue cases by month and year
Month	2021	2020	2019	2018	2017	2016	2015	2014	2013	2012	2048
January	1,496	11,608	5,580	7,278	10,927	6,694	6,345	3,610	3,462	3,986	
February	1,794	5,368	3,736	4,490	8,724	4,439	3,731	2,011	3,258	3,145	
March	849	1,683	3,832	3,380	13,540	2,696	1,962	1,648	2,996	2,628	
April	1,702	511	2,970	2,618	12,510	2,832	1,293	1,682	2,109	2,028	
May	137	1,548	4,260	3,560	15,936	2,422	1,625	4,292	2,614	2,550	
June		2,252	6,019	5,513	25,319	4,731	1,477	6,736	2,427	5,955	
July		2,288	8,897	6,455	41,121	10,715	2,125	5,721	2,924	5,193	
August		1,559	9,546	4,293	22,270	4,873	1,604	4,022	3,282	5,266	
September		1,209	7,307	2,049	9,519	3,629	1,099	2,640	1,912	2,857	
October		1,028	11,573	1,905	6,614	2,185	2,066	4,297	1,636	3,181	
November		779	21,769	4,537	8,868	2,257	2,762	5,452	2,611	4,034	
December		1,318	19,560	5,581	10,753	7,677	3,688	5,91	2,832	3,638	
Total	6,389	31,162	105,049	51,659	186,101	55,150	29,777	47,502	32,063	44,461	

Dengue cases by region
Region		Cases	
Provinces	Districts	2021	2020
(Western Province, Sri Lanka) Western	Colombo	1,027	4,257
(Western Province, Sri Lanka) Western	Gampaha	525	2,666
(Western Province, Sri Lanka) Western	Kalutara	346	1,810
(Western Province, Sri Lanka) Western	Total	1,898	8,733
(Central Province, Sri Lanka) Central	Kandy	252	3,443
(Central Province, Sri Lanka) Central	Matale	34	595
(Central Province, Sri Lanka) Central	Nuwara Eliya	23	168
(Central Province, Sri Lanka) Central	Total	309	4,206
(Southern Province, Sri Lanka) Southern	Galle	90	1,671
(Southern Province, Sri Lanka) Southern	Matara	147	545
(Southern Province, Sri Lanka) Southern	Hambantota	126	368
(Southern Province, Sri Lanka) Southern	Total	363	2,584
(North Western Province, Sri Lanka) North Western	Kurunegala	382	969
(North Western Province, Sri Lanka) North Western	Puttalam	165	500
(North Western Province, Sri Lanka) North Western	Total	547	1,469
(Sabaragamuwa Province) Sabaragamuwa	Kegalle	173	865
(Sabaragamuwa Province) Sabaragamuwa	Ratnapura	211	2,014
(Sabaragamuwa Province) Sabaragamuwa	Total	384	2,879
(Eastern Province, Sri Lanka) Eastern	Trincomalee	80	2,296
(Eastern Province, Sri Lanka) Eastern	Batticaloa	2,818	3,717
(Eastern Province, Sri Lanka) Eastern	Ampara	134	1,298
(Eastern Province, Sri Lanka) Eastern	Total	3,032	5,015
(North Central Province, Sri Lanka) North Central	Anuradhapura	55	433
(North Central Province, Sri Lanka) North Central	Polonnaruwa	23	251
(North Central Province, Sri Lanka) North Central	Total	78	684
(Northern Province, Sri Lanka) Northern	Jaffna	94	2,157
(Northern Province, Sri Lanka) Northern	Kilinochchi	20	135
(Northern Province, Sri Lanka) Northern	Mannar	19	137
(Northern Province, Sri Lanka) Northern	Mullaitivu	3	90
(Northern Province, Sri Lanka) Northern	Vavuniya	24	252
(Northern Province, Sri Lanka) Northern	Total	160	2,771
(Uva Province) Uva	Badulla	31	525
(Uva Province) Uva	Monaragala	39	0
(Uva Province) Uva	Total	70	525

== History ==
Dengue outbreaks started to emerge in Sri Lanka in the 1960s, with the Ministry of Health first serologically confirming the disease in Sri Lanka in 1962. However, unofficial British Ceylon clinical studies recorded dengue-like cases in Sri Lanka in the early 20th century. The first outbreak was confirmed in 1965 and was associated with DEN types 1 and 2, with 51 cases and 15 deaths between 1965 and 1968. Since 1989 dengue has become a major problem in Sri Lanka. From 1970 to 1990, multiple outbreaks with endemic were reported in Western Province urban areas. In 1990 dengue cases rose 1,350 of 54 deaths. In the early 1990s, annual dengue cases were reported as being up to 1,000. In 2002 the largest outbreak in recent years was recorded, with 8,931 cases and 64 deaths. The following year, 2003, was one of relatively low endemicity, with only 4,749 suspected cases and 32 deaths reported. In 2004 there were 15,463 suspected cases and 88 deaths reported to the Epidemiological Unit of the Ministry of Health. During the year 2005, 5,211 cases of suspected cases of DF/DHF and 26 deaths were reported to the Epidemiological Unit.

Most reported dengue cases were in the Western Province. Outbreaks from 2005 to 2008 were attributed to a new mutation DEN type 3. Almost all the districts in Sri Lanka have reported cases and posed a threat to the health of the people. Colombo, Gampaha, Kalutara and Kandy districts have recorded highest number of cases.

== Background ==
Sri Lanka is a tropical and warm country. Mean temperatures range from 28 °C. The rainfall pattern is influenced by monsoon winds from the Indian Ocean and Bay of Bengal. Average rain at 800 to 1,200 mm per year. Average humidity from 75% during different seasons and in the different regions of the country. Tropical region humidity ranges from 75% to 90%. Sri Lanka is a tropical country with two monsoons: the northeast monsoon (December to March) and the southwest monsoon (May to September). Two annual peaks have been identified in the occurrence of dengue cases in the country in association with the monsoon rain.

== See also ==
- Dengue fever
- Mosquito-borne disease
- Tropical disease
- 1934-35 malaria outbreak in Ceylon
