= Raja Sinnathuray =

Sri Lankan politician (died 2022)

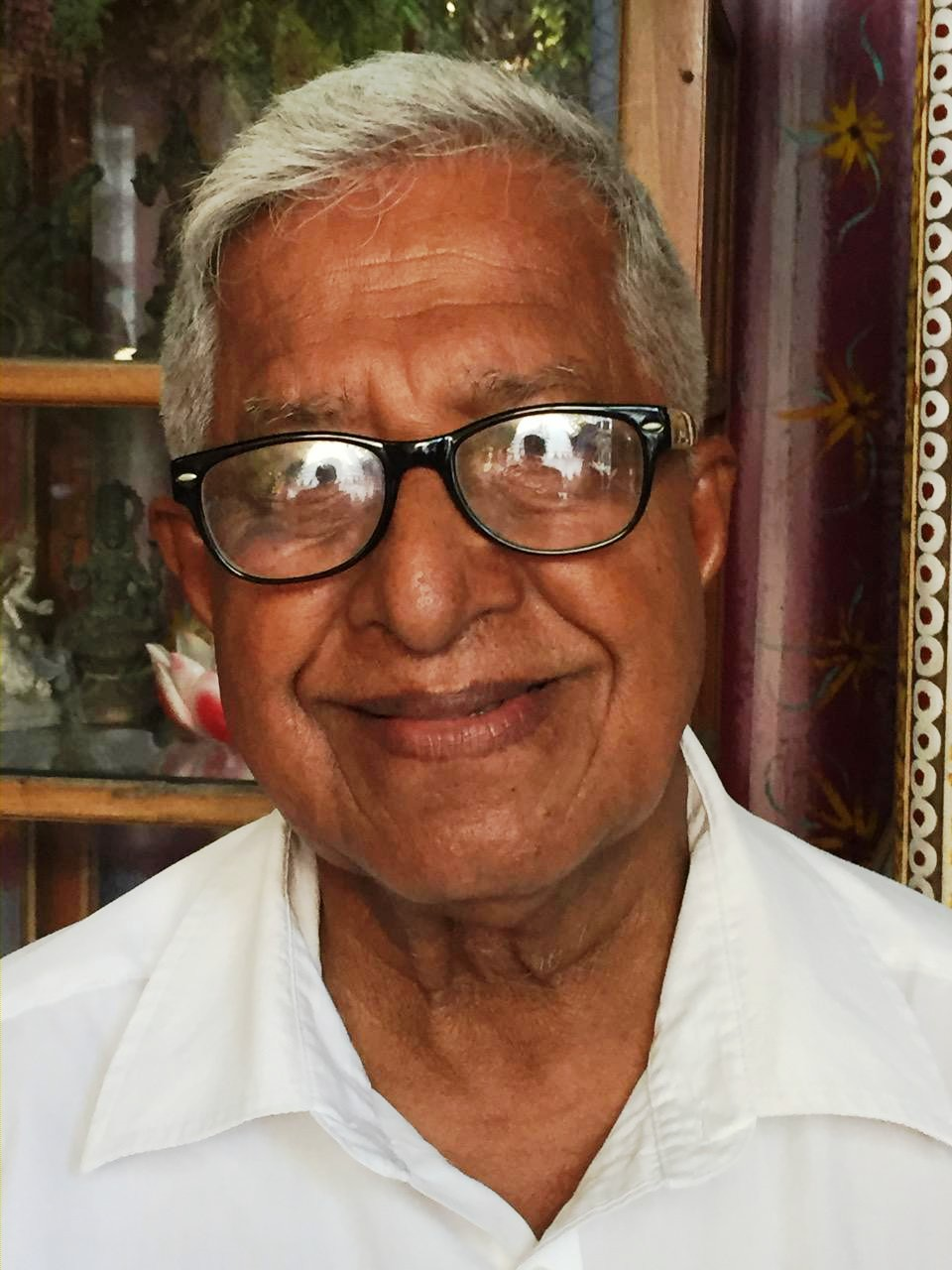

Councillor of Western Provincial Council
- In office 1988–1993

Personal details
- Died: 3 October 2022 Colombo, Sri Lanka
- Spouse: Malini Sinnathuray
- Children: Sasihikala and Pushpakala
- Education: Wesley College, Colombo
- Ethnicity: Sri Lankan Tamil

Raja Sinnathuray was a Sri Lankan politician. He was a Member of the Western Provincial Council from 1988 to 1993.

== Family ==
Sinnathuray and his wife Malini had two daughters, Sasihikala and Pushpakala.

== Death ==
Sinnathuray died on 3 October 2022 in Colombo, Sri Lanka.
