= M. H. Mohamed =

Sri Lankan politician

Hon. M. H. Mohamed

14th Speaker of the Parliament
- In office 9 March 1989 – 24 June 1994
- President: Dingiri Banda Wijetunga; Ranasinghe Premadasa
- Prime Minister: Ranil Wickremesinghe; Dingiri Banda Wijetunga
- Preceded by: E. L. Senanayake
- Succeeded by: Kiri Banda Ratnayake

Minister of Western Region Development
- In office 2001–2004

Minister of Parliamentary Affairs
- In office 2007–2010
- Preceded by: Wiswa Warnapala
- Succeeded by: Sumedha G. Jayasena

Member of Parliament for Colombo
- In office 1989–2010

Mayor of Colombo
- In office 1960–1962

Personal details
- Born: 15 June 1921 Maligawatta, Colombo
- Died: 26 April 2016 (aged 94) Colombo, Sri Lanka
- Party: United National Party
- Spouse: Noor Naseema
- Relations: Ruvaiz Haniffa, Firaz Hameed, Fazal Hameed, Shaaz Mohamed, Fawaz Hameed, Ifham Ariff, Rifard Ariff, Farah Ibrahim, Naseema Mohamed, Amra Mohamed, Aaliya Mohamed, Ajwad Hashim, Saaraa Hameed, Shahir Haniffa, Atheek Mohamed, Faheem Hameed, Salma Hashim, Shahima Ariff, Hafsa Haniffa, Fayyad Hameed, Mariam Ahamed.
- Children: Ummu Haniffa, Thufa Hameed, Shaha Ariff, Shaul Mohamed, Hussain Mohamed, Hussan Mohamed, Haniffa Mohamed, Azahim Mohamed
- Education: Wesley College
- Profession: Politician

Mohamed Haniffa Mohamed (15 June 1921 – 26 April 2016) was a Sri Lankan politician. Mohamed served as the 14th Speaker of the Parliament of Sri Lanka as well as being a former member of Parliament and government minister. Mohamed was the first Sri Lankan Moor to hold office as Mayor of Colombo from 1960 to 1962.

== Early life ==
Born 15 June 1921, Mohamed was educated at Wesley College, Colombo. After completing his schooling, he joined Cargills Ltd., where he became active in trade union activities. Later he joined the family shipping firm, Nagoor Meera and Sons. His grandfather Marhoom Abdur Rahman was a member of the Legislative Council of Ceylon.

== Political career ==
Mohamed entered politics having been elected to the Colombo Municipal Council from the Maligawatte Ward and served as Mayor of Colombo from 1960 to 1962. He contested the 1965 general elections as the United National Party candidate in the Borella electorate and was elected to parliament defeating the Lanka Sama Samaja Party (LSSP) candidate Vivienne Goonewardena. He lost his seat in the 1970 general elections to LSSP candidate Kusala Abhayavardhana by 16,421 votes to 15,829 votes. He was re-elected to parliament in the 1977 general elections and would retain his seat until 2010 in the consecutive elections that followed. In 1977, he was appointed to the Cabinet by J.R. Jayawardena as Minister of Transport. Mohamed was also actively involved in the 'impeachment drama' of Ranasinghe Premadasa, the then President of Sri Lanka, staged in October 1991. While holding the office as the Speaker of House of Representatives, initially, he sided with the UNP dissidents led by Premadasa's colleagues Lalith Athulathmudali and Gamini Dissanaike. Subsequently, he switched sides to that of the then President, and enabled Premadasa to defeat the No Confidence motion, pressed against him by the UNP dissidents.

== Role in anti-Tamil violence ==
In the Black July pogrom of 1983, M.H. Mohamed unleashed his thugs to attack Tamils in Borella. In April 1985, President J. R. Jayewardene sent M. H. Mohamed, along with his henchmen to attack Tamils in the village of Karaitivu (Ampara). Muslim youth with the support of the security forces killed several Tamils, raped several women and burned over 2000 Tamil homes, rendering 15,000 Tamils homeless.
