= Suri Ratnapala =

Australian academic

Suri Ratnapala is an Australian academic. He is Emeritus Professor of Public Law of the University of Queensland in Brisbane, Australia.

== Biography ==
Born in Colombo, Sri Lanka, Suri Ratnapala attended the Royal College, Colombo and the University of Colombo, where he gained his first law degree. His father Amaradasa Ratnapala was a medical doctor and politician. His mother, Ancy Samarasinha, was member of a prominent family in the Southern Province of Sri Lanka. Ratnapala is married to Rusri, née Gunasekera. Their son, Dr Adrian Ratnapala, is a scientist working Germany.

Ratnapala served as a Senior State Counsel, and represented the Sri Lankan State in constitutional cases. He migrated to Australia in 1983. In 1988 he was appointed as Lecturer at the T C Beirne School of Law and, in 2001, was appointed to the Chair of Public Law. He retired in 2014 and was appointed Emeritus Professor.

In 1990, his book Welfare State or Constitutional State? was awarded a Sir Antony Fisher International Memorial Prize by a panel chaired by James Buchanan. In 2000, he received a John Templeton Foundation award for inter-disciplinary teaching spanning legal, political, economic and social theory. In 2003 he was awarded a Centenary of Australian Federation Medal for his contribution to Australian society through research in law and economics. He is a Fellow of the International Centre for Economic Research International Centre for Economic Research (ICER) | EDIRC/RePEc and a Visiting Fellow of the Social Philosophy and Policy Centre at the Bowling Green State University in Ohio. He is also a member of the Editorial Advisory Council of the Centre for Independent Studies (CIS). He has been a member of the Mont Pelerin Society since 1998.

== Bibliography ==
- Australian Constitutional Law: Foundations and Theory
- Welfare State or Constitutional State?
- Illusions of Comparable Worth
- Jurisprudence
- Jurisprudence of Liberty
