= Sampath Wickremeratne =

Chief of Staff of the Sri Lanka Air Force

Air Vice Marshal Sampath Wickremeratne is the incumbent Chief of Staff of the Sri Lanka Air Force. Prior to this appointment, he served as Director General Air Operations for the Sri Lanka Air Force. He served as Minister (Defence) at Sri Lankan Embassy in Washington DC, USA while he was Air Commodore.

== Early life and education ==
Wickremeratne completed his high school education from Wesley College Colombo. Then he join Sri Lankan Air Force in 1989 at General Duties Pilot Branch. He completed NDC course from India and Senior Aviation Commanders Course from Air Force Command College China.

== Career ==
Wickremeratne appointed as Chief of staff on 9 July 2023. Earlier, in his career, he was Base Commander Sri Lanka Air Force Base Ratmalana. He also served as Senior Air Staff Officer (SASO) at the Directorate of Air Operations and handled Air Operations at Air Headquarters and Ministry of Defence.

== Awards ==
In recognition of his unblemished and distinguished service, Wickremeratne has been awarded with gallantry medals on six occasions and he was also awarded the Uttama Sewa Padakkama for his unblemished service career to date.
