= Kalawana Electoral District =

Electoral district of Sri Lanka

Kalawana electoral district was an electoral district of Sri Lanka between March 1960 and February 1989. The district was named after the town of Kalawana in Ratnapura District, Sabaragamuwa Province. The 1978 Constitution of Sri Lanka introduced the proportional representation electoral system for electing members of Parliament. The existing 160 mainly single-member electoral districts were replaced with 22 multi-member electoral districts. Kalawana electoral district was replaced by the Ratnapura multi-member electoral district at the 1989 general elections.

== Members of Parliament ==
Key

Independent SLFP UNP Communist Party

Election	Member	Party	Term
1960 (March)	Abeyratne Pilapitiya	United National Party	1960 - 1960
1960 (July)	L. de S.A. Gunasekera	Sri Lanka Freedom Party	1960 - 1965
1965	Abeyratne Pilapitiya	United National Party	1965 - 1970
1970	Sarath Muttetuwegama	Communist Party of Sri Lanka	1970-1977
1977	Abeyratne Pilapitiya	United National Party	1977-1981
1981 by-election	Sarath Muttetuwegama	Communist Party of Sri Lanka	1981-1989

== Elections ==
=== 1960 (March) Parliamentary General Election ===
Candidate	Party	Symbol	Votes	%
Abeyratne Pilapitiya	United National Party	Elephant		
Valid Votes				100.00%
Rejected Votes				
Total Polled				
Registered Electors				
Turnout				

=== 1960 (July) Parliamentary General Election ===
Candidate	Party	Symbol	Votes	%
L. de S.A. Gunasekera	Sri Lanka Freedom Party	Hand		
Valid Votes				100.00%
Rejected Votes				
Total Polled				
Registered Electors				
Turnout				

=== 1965 Parliamentary General Election ===
Candidate	Party	Symbol	Votes	%
Abeyratne Pilapitiya	United National Party	Elephant		
Valid Votes				100.00%
Rejected Votes				
Total Polled				
Registered Electors				
Turnout				

=== 1970 Parliamentary General Election ===
Candidate	Party	Symbol	Votes	%
Sarath Muttetuwegama	Communist Party of Ceylon	Star		
Valid Votes				100.00%
Rejected Votes				
Total Polled				
Registered Electors				
Turnout				

=== 1977 Parliamentary General Election ===
Candidate	Party	Symbol	Votes	%
Abeyratne Pilapitiya	United National Party	Elephant	12,098	
Sarath Muttetuwegama	Communist Party of Ceylon	Star	10,436	
S. S. Gauthamadasa	Sri Lanka Freedom Party	Hand	1,668	
H. R. S. de Zoysa		Chair	86	
Valid Votes				100.00%
Rejected Votes			61	
Total Polled			24,288	100.00
Registered Electors			26,964	
Turnout				
