= Wesley College, Colombo =

Wesley College
- වෙස්ලි විද්‍යාලය உவெசுலி கல்லூரி

Location
- Borella, Colombo; Sri Lanka; 6°55′16″N 79°52′34″E

Information
- School type: Semi Government
- Motto: Ora et Labora (Pray and Labour)
- Established: 2 March 1874; 152 years ago
- Founder: Daniel Henry Pereira
- Educational authority: Sri Lanka Education Department
- Principal: Avanka Fernando
- Chaplain: Dinuka Silva
- Staff: 300+
- Grades: 1–13
- Gender: Male
- Age: 6 to 19
- Enrollment: 3,500+
- Education system: National Education System Pearson Edexcel
- Language: English, Sinhala and Tamil
- Colours: Cambridge blue and Oxford blue
- Song: Wesley to the Fore
- Publication: The Double Blue (est. 1898)
- Affiliation: Methodist
- Alumni: Wesleyites
- Brother schools: Kingswood College; Richmond College
- Website: wesleycollegecolombo.info

Wesley College popularly known as "Wesley" or "The Double Blues", is a Methodist school providing primary and secondary education in Sri Lanka since 1874.

== History ==
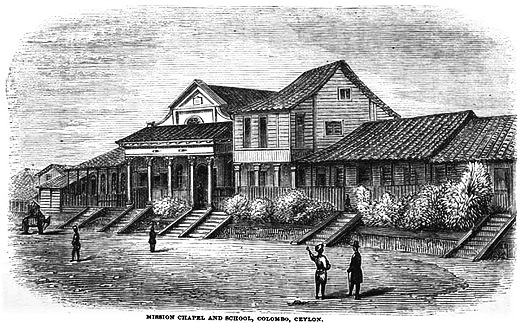
Drawing of Dam street church and the school

In 1858, Rev. Joseph Rippon wanted to establish a superior educational institution for the Wesleyan Methodist Mission in South Ceylon. On 2 March 1874 (the death anniversary of Rev. John Wesley) Wesley College was founded in the City Mission buildings at Dam Street, Pettah. The school's first principal was Rev. Samuel R. Wilkin and the first vice-principal was Rev. Daniel Henry Pereira.

Many years later, under the guiding hand of Rev. Henry Highfield, Wesley was moved from Dam Street, Pettah to its current residence at Karlsruhe Gardens, Borella in 1907.

The Methodist institution was envisaged to be a distinctly Christian college, but it currently provides secondary education for over 3,000 Sri Lankan students from diverse religious and ethnic backgrounds.

Wesley College has established two branches to accommodate its growing number of students. One branch is situated in the Colombo suburb of Havelock Town, while the other is in Thampola, Katunayake.

Wesley College is named after John Wesley (1703–1791), the founder of the Methodist Church.

== College song ==
The song was the first-ever school anthem to be written in the country. The lyrics were composed by H. J. V. I. Ekanayake in 1898, and set to the music of "Scots Wha Hae" by Robert Burns. This music is adapted from the traditional Scottish patriotic tune "Hey Tuttie Tatie", which was composed in 1314.

== Houses ==
The house system was suggested by Rev. Henry Highfield and introduced by Rev Albert Hutchinson. Wesley College has four main houses, which were further divided by C. J. Oorloff as senior houses and junior houses. The houses are named after former principals and teachers, as follows:

- Senior house - Wilkin / Junior house - Dias
- Senior house - Moscrop / Junior house - Lemphers
- Senior house - Hillard / Junior house - Mack
- Senior house - Passmore / Junior house - Honter

== Sports ==
=== L.E. Blaze Trophy ===
The annual L. E. Blaze Trophy rugby match between Wesley College and Kingswood College that dates back decades. It is named in honour of Louis Edmund Blaze, the founder of Kingswood College and a pioneer of school sports in Sri Lanka.

== Notable alumni ==
Name	Notability	Reference
Kamal Addaraarachchi	actor	
E. W. Adikaram	social activist, philosopher, founder of multiple schools in Sri Lanka (Anula Vidyalaya, Ananda Balika Vidyalaya Kotte 1971; Ananda Sastralaya, Matugama)	
Rohan Amerasekera	Commander of the Air Force (1962–1970)	
Claude Corea	member of parliament (1931–1946)	
Oliver Ernest Goonetilleke	Governor-General of Ceylon (1954–1962)	
Walisinghe Harischandra	social reformer, historian, author	
Don Baron Jayatilaka		
Brendon Kuruppu	international cricket player (1987–1991)	
E. F. C. Ludowyk	first Professor of English, University of Ceylon	
Farveez Maharoof	international cricket player (2004–2011)	
Mohamed Macan Markar	member of Legislative Council of Ceylon (1924– )	
M. H. Mohamed	Speaker of Sri Lanka Parliament (1989–1994) Cabinet Minister (1965–1970, 1977–1988 & 2001–2004) member of parliament (Colombo 1965–1970 & 1977–2004 –2010), Mayor of Colombo (1960–1962)	
Wapchie Marikar Abdul Rahman	member of Legislative Council of Ceylon	
Mahadevan Sathasivam	international cricket player (1944–1949)	
Jeffrey Vandersay	One Day International cricket player (2015–present)	
Sampath Wickremeratne	Chief of Staff, Sri Lanka Air Force	
Gerard Wijeyekoon	member of Legislative Council of Ceylon	
Raja Sinnathuray	former member of the Western Provincial Council	

== See also ==
- Category:People associated with Wesley College, Colombo
- Schools in Sri Lanka
- Oldest schools in Sri Lanka
