= Sarath Muttetuwegama =

Sri Lankan politician

Sarath Muttetuwegama (29 April 1935 – 19 May 1986) was a Sri Lankan lawyer and communist politician. He was a member of parliament from Kalawana.

Born Sarathchandra Muttetuwegama to the Rate Mahatmaya of Kalawana, Muttetuwegama qualified as an advocate. A member of the Communist Party, he unsuccessfully contested the March 1960, and 1965 general elections from Ratnapura. He was elected to parliament in the 1970 general election from Kalawana. He lost the 1977 general election to Abeyratne Pilapitiya, however when Pilapitiya was unseated following an election petition, Muttetuwegama was elected in the by-election at followed 1981. He was killed in a car crash in Ratnapura in 1986, while in office. At the time, he was the only Communist member of Sri Lanka’s Parliament.

He was married to Manouri de Silva, a barrister and daughter of Dr Colvin R. de Silva, a leftist politician and lawyer.
