= Sunethra Ranasinghe =

Sri Lankan politician

Hon. Sunethra Ranasinghe

3rd Mayor of Dehiwala-Mount Lavinia
- In office 1996–2002
- Preceded by: Susil De Silva Jayasinghe
- Succeeded by: Danasiri Amaratunga

Member of Parliament for Dehiwala-Mount Lavinia
- In office 1977–1989
- Preceded by: S. de Silva Jayasinghe
- Succeeded by: Constituency abolished

Member of Parliament for Colombo
- In office 1989–1994

Personal details
- Party: United National Party

Sunethra Ranasinghe is a Sri Lankan politician and a former member of the Parliament of Sri Lanka. She was elected to the seat of Dehiwala-Mount Lavinia in a by-election in 1977, replacing her father S. de Silva Jayasinghe who died whilst in office. She is a Member of the United National Party. She served as the Minister of Health.
