= L. de S. A. Gunasekera =

Ceylonese politician (1933–2009)

Lionel de Silva Abeyweera Gunasekera (18 April 1933 – 15 May 2009) was a Ceylonese school teacher and politician.

Having started his career as a clerk, he became an English language teacher, he was elected to parliament from the Sri Lanka Freedom Party in the July 1960 general election from Kalawana defeating incumbent Abeyratne Pilapitiya. He was the father of fourteen children.
