= Amaradasa Ratnapala =

Ceylonese physician and politician

Amaradasa Ratnapala (8 January 1903 - 13 October 2001) was a Ceylonese physician, a former member of Parliament and scholar of Buddhist Philosophy, whose book on Abhidharmartha Pradeepeka is a commentary on the doctrine.

Ratnapala received his education at Royal College, Colombo, where he excelled in schoolboy cricket.

In May 1937 he was elected to the Colombo Municipal Council representing Slave Island and was subsequently elected to the position of deputy mayor in January 1944, where he held the position for eleven months. He left the Council on 8 August 1945.

At the 1st parliamentary election, held between 23 August 1947 and 20 September 1947, Ratnapala contested the seat of Wellawatte-Galkissa, representing the United National Party, where he came fourth, polling 1,327 votes (6.1% of the total vote). He was appointed to the House of Representatives by the Governor-General, Sir Oliver Goonetilleke in 1960 and again by William Gopallawa in 1965, serving until 1970.

Ratnapala married Ancy Samarasinha, and they had five children. Ravindra, Chandrika, Mahindra (Mahi), Surindra (Suri), and Narendra.

== Bibliography ==
- Ratnapala, Amaradasa, ed. (1964). Abhidharmartha Pradeepika. Vol. I. Colombo: M. D. Gunasena.
- Ratnapala, Amaradasa, ed. (1964). Abhidharmartha Pradeepika. Vol. II. Colombo: M. D. Gunasena.
- Ratnapala, Amaradasa, ed. (1965). Abhidharmartha Pradeepika. Vol. III. Colombo: M. D. Gunasena.
- Ratnapala, Amaradasa, ed. (1967). Abhidharmartha Pradeepika. Vol. IV. Colombo: M. D. Gunasena.
