= Land Reform Law (Sri Lanka) =

Sri Lankan legislation

Parliament of Sri Lanka
- Long title: Land Reform Law No. 1 of 1972
- Territorial extent: Sri Lanka
- Enacted by: Parliament of Sri Lanka
- Enacted: 1972

Repeals
- Land Reform (Amendment) Act. 1983
- Status: In force

The Land Reform Law was a land reform law enacted by the United Front government of Sri Lanka, led by then Prime Minister Sirimavo Bandaranaike and executed by Minister Hector Kobbekaduwa. The law set a ceiling on the extent of agricultural land (50 acres of plantation land and 25 acres of paddy land) that could be owned by individuals. Provided for the vesting of land in excess to the Land Reform Commission (LRC). The act was amended in 1975 and in 1983.

== Background ==
When Ceylon gained independence in 1948, much of its 3.2 million acres of agricultural land was occupied by export crops: tea, rubber, and coconut, comprising a total of 2 million acres. By contrast, only 900,000 acres were used for paddy, the primary subsistence crop.

By 1970, the agricultural land area had increased to 4.5 million acres, including 1.2 million acres of primary crops and 2.2 million acres of export crops. During this period, more estates came under local ownership due to the flight of foreign investment following nationalization efforts.

== Land Reform Law No. 1 of 1972 ==
The United Front government passed the Land Reform Law No. 1 of 1972 in August 1972. The act established the Land Reform Commission and vested it with the power to acquire private land over excess of the prescribed ceiling and utilize it to increase productivity and output. Following the government proclamation after the passing of the Land Reform Law of 1972, 5,600 people declared ownership of land in excess of the stipulated. This amounted to 1.2 million acres, of which 563,411 acres of land was acquired by the LRC within the first two years as part of the first phase.

== Land Reform (Amendment) Law of 1975 ==
The second phase of acquisition started with the passing of the Land Reform (Amendment) Law of 1975. 1972 and 1975, the government had purchased by voluntary sale or under the Land Acquisition Act of 1951 65,000 acres land owned by public companies. Following the Amendment in 1975, the LRC took over 417,957 acres. This brought the total acquired land under the land reform program to 1,000,000 acres or 22% of the land under agriculture, making the state the single largest landowner in the country. Much of the acquired land was in the Wet Zone of the island and only 5% was in the Dry Zone. Only 2% of the acquired land was paddy land. LRC Compensations Board negotiated compensation, which amounted to, on average Rs 600 per acre, with public companies being paid over a 5-year period starting from 1977.

== Reform program ==
"many people conceive of land reform as a process of expropriation of land, and the distribution of such land among the landless peasants. I do not intend directing the land reforms programme towards that objective. I firmly believe that estates which are highly productive and which are economically viable should remain as distinctive units"

— Hector Kobbekaduwa, the Minister of Agriculture and Lands, August 1974,

Management of the now government-owned estates was transferred to the State Plantation Corporation, People's Estate Development Board and the Up-Country Cooperative Estate under the State Agricultural Corporations Act of 1972. Some of the land was given to Electoral Cooperatives and Land Reform Cooperatives. Only 12% of the land was given to the landless peasants.

== Later amendments ==
The Land Reform Law was amended several times in the 1980's under the Land Reform (Amendment) Act. 1983 and Land Reform (Special Provisions) Act No. 14 of 1986, which changed the calculation of compensation and definition of agricultural lands.
