= Danister de Silva =

Ceylonese physician and politician

Walinetti Danister de Silva (20 September 1921 – 1965) was a Ceylonese physician and politician. He was elected from the Borella electorate from the Sri Lanka Freedom Party to the House of Representatives defeating Dr R. B. Lenora in the 1960 July general elections, having been defeated in the 1960 March general elections by Dr R. B. Lenora. The Base Line Road was renamed Dr Danister de Silva Mawatha after him.
