= Colvin R. de Silva =

Sri Lankan politician

Hon. Dr Colvin Reginald de Silva
- Colvin R. de Silva in the cloak of an advocate

Minister of Plantation Industries
- In office 31 May 1970 – 2 September 1975
- Prime Minister: Sirimavo Bandaranaike
- Succeeded by: Ratnasiri Wickremanayake

Member of Parliament for Agalawatte
- In office 1967–1977
- Preceded by: Anil Moonesinghe
- Succeeded by: Merill Kariyawasam

Member of Parliament for Wellawatte-Galkissa
- In office 1956–1960
- Preceded by: S. de Silva Jayasinghe
- Succeeded by: Constituency abolished
- In office 1947–1952
- Preceded by: Constituency established
- Succeeded by: S. de Silva Jayasinghe

Personal details
- Born: 1907
- Died: 1989 (aged 81–82) Colombo, Sri Lanka
- Party: Lanka Sama Samaja Party
- Education: King's College London, University of Ceylon, Royal College Colombo, St. John's College Panadura
- Occupation: Advocate, Politician
- Profession: Barrister

Colvin Reginald de Silva (1907 – 27 February 1989; commonly known as Colvin R. de Silva) was a Sri Lankan Cabinet Minister of Plantation Industries and Constitutional Affairs, prominent member of parliament, Trotskyist leader and lawyer in Sri Lanka. He was one of the founders of the Lanka Sama Samaja Party, the first Marxist party in Sri Lanka.

== Early life and education ==
Colvin R. de Silva was born in Balapitiya. His father Obinamuni Arnolis de Silva, was a registered medical practitioner attached to the Department of Health. His mother Pettagan Joseline De Silva was a daughter of a business tycoon Pettagan Aseneris De Silva, His elder brother was Walwin de Silva, a civil servant.

He received his primary education at St. John's College, Panadura and secondary education at Royal College, Colombo where he won colours for sports. He thereafter studied history at University College, Ceylon from 1924 to 1926. He then went to London in 1926 for further studies and gained his PhD from King's College London in 1932 for his thesis: Ceylon Under the British Occupation, later published as a book. Having studied law at Lincoln's Inn, he was called to the bar as a Barrister. During his time in the United Kingdom, he visited the Soviet Union.

== Legal career ==
On his return to Ceylon, Colvin R. de Silva took oaths as an advocate of the Supreme Court of Ceylon and started his practice as a lawyer. He gained fame in the writ of Habeas Corpus related to Mark Anthony Bracegirdle, where he appeared for Bracegirdle as junior of H.V. Perera. From 1940s to 1960s Colvin R. de Silva enjoyed an unparalleled reputation as a criminal lawyer of great distinction. He appeared in virtually every high-profile criminal trial of his day. In the Sathasivam murder case, his exceptionally brilliant cross-examining skills resulted in the acquittal of his client, while in the Kularatne murder case appeal, it was his intimate knowledge of the law of circumstantial evidence that saved the accused. With the advent of Fundamental Rights litigation, de Silva also appeared in many such cases before the Supreme Court, most notably in the Vivienne Goonewardena assault case. He continued his legal practice until his death, with the exception of when he was serving as a minister.

== Political career ==
=== Early politics ===
Colvin R. de Silva became the first president of the Lanka Sama Samaja Party when it was established on 21 December 1935 at Lorenz College Hall, along with Dr. N.M. Perera, Leslie Goonewardene, Philip Gunawardena and Robert Gunawardena.

An active Trotskyist, during the Second World War he fled to India, after escaping from Bogambara Prison, where he had been imprisoned on charges of sedition for anti-war activities. In India he became part of the leading nucleus of the Bolshevik-Leninist Party of India, Ceylon and Burma (BLPI). After the war he returned to Ceylon and became the main leader of the Bolshevik Samasamaja Party (BSP).

=== Parliament (1947-1952,1956-1960,1967-1977) ===
In 1947 he was one of five BSP candidates who were elected to parliament. His constituency was Wellawatte-Galkissa. After the reunification of LSSP and BSP, de Silva became an important leader of LSSP. In 1952 he lost the Wellawatte-Galkissa seat to the United National Party candidate, S. de Silva Jayasinghe due to the unpopularity he gained for his role in the Sathasivam murder case, but regained it at the subsequent parliamentary elections in 1956.

==== Opposing the "Sinhala Only" bill in 1956 ====
During the passing of the Sinhala Only Act, he spoke his famous last words: "Do we... want a single nation or do we want two nations? Do we want a single state or do we want two? Do we want one Ceylon or do we want two? And above all, do we want an independent Ceylon which must necessarily be united and single and single Ceylon, or two bleeding halves of Ceylon which can be gobbled up by every ravaging imperialist monster that may happen to range the Indian ocean? These are issues that in fact we have been discussing under the form and appearance of language issue." His predictions came true a few years later with the formation of Liberation Tigers of Tamil Eelam (LTTE) and subsequent civil war between the LTTE separatist movement and the Sri Lankan government.

De Silva was responsible on behalf of LSSP for the liaisons with the Fourth International. He was elected to the International Executive Committee of the International, a position he held until the LSSP was expelled from the International. In 1964 de Silva had urged against the LSSP joining the government, but unlike others who stood by that line he stayed in the party. He won the Agalawatte parliamentary seat in a by-election in 1967 and in 1970.

=== Minister of Plantation Industries and Constitutional Affairs (1970-1975) ===
The LSSP formed an alliance with the Sri Lanka Freedom Party, winning a landslide victory gaining in a two-thirds majority in the 1970 Ceylonese parliamentary election. Returning to parliament as the member for Agalawatte, Silva was appointed Minister of Plantation Industries and Constitutional Affairs in the cabinet of Sirimavo Bandaranaike. Two of the landmark reforms introduced by introduced by his government were the 1972 Republican Constitution and the Land Reforms which nationalised the plantation sector which was the primary foreign exchange earner in the country at the time. He played a major role in drafting the new republican constitution of Sri Lanka, which is seen by Kumari Jayawardena as the first constitutional enshrinement of Sinhala chauvinism which had previously been limited to statute law. He served until 1975, when his party was dismissed from government following a split. He lost his seat at the 1977 parliament elections along with all the leftists who contested.

=== Party leader ===
After the death of Dr. N. M. Perera the LSSP leader, Colvin de Silva became the leader and the party nominated de Silva as its presidential candidate in 1982. He finished 5th and only polled around 1% of the votes cast, as the election was polarised between the ruling United National Party and the Sri Lanka Freedom Party, the latter being backed by almost all the other left parties. In 1987 he led a protest against the ban on May Day rallies in Sri Lanka and suffered a serious burn injury on one of his feet due to a tear gas cartridge that was thrown at the protesters by the police, which troubled him till his death. In 1988, his party came to an alliance with three other leftist parties to form United Socialist Alliance (USA) from which he was nominated as a national list member of parliament (MP).

== Death ==
He died a few days prior to taking his oath as an MP under new alliance on 27 February 1989 in Colombo. Union Place, Colombo was named after him.

== Family ==
Colvin R. de Silva married Pettagan Suvineetha De Silva from his home town of Balapitiya. She was the daughter of Pettagan Benial De Silva, a businessman. They had two daughters and one son. All their children took to law with both daughters becoming barristers. Their eldest Manouri Muttetuwegama was a former Commissioner of the Human Rights Commission of Sri Lanka and was married to Sarath Muttetuwegama, Communist Party member of Parliament. Their youngest was Nalina and their only son was Nalina Visvajith. The family lived down Abdul Gafoor Mawatha in Colpetty. He was a cousin of Charles Percival de Silva.

== Publications ==
- De Silva, Colvin R., Ceylon Under the British Occupation, 1795–1833 First published 1941. Reprint: Delhi, Vedam Books, 1995
- De Silva, Colvin R., An Outline of the Permanent Revolution
