= Caroline Anthonypillai =

Caroline Anthonypillai (born Dona Caroline Rupasinghe Gunawardena; 8 October 1908 – 7 July 2009) was the wife of S. C. C. Anthonypillai, a Sri Lankan union organizer and Indian politician. An activist in her own right, she was eulogized as a "leading light of the leftist movement".

== Early life ==
Caroline (born Dona Caroline Rupasinghe Gunawardena) was born on 8 October 1908, in Avissawella to Don Jakolis Rupasinghe Gunawardena, a headman of the village and British agent, and his wife. She had eight siblings, including Philip Gunawardena.

After her father was arrested by the British during communal roundups, she was sent to a Buddhist girls' school, where she gained nationalist views. After completing her studies, she went back to her village to teach at a Buddhist school.

She was asked to teach Sinhala to Anthonypillai, one of many Tamils who decided to join the labor movement. Though he was a Tamil Christian and she was a Sinhala Buddhist, and she was six years older than he was, they married in 1939 and had four children.

== Pre-war activism ==
In 1931, she began to work on political campaigns, and helped her brother contest a close election, which deepened her resolve for social justice. She also participated in protests to gain equal rights for Ceylonese soldiers of World War I, who were neglected by the colonial government. In 1935, she helped found the Lanka Sama Samaja Party (Sri Lanka's first political party) with her brothers, Harry, Philip, and Robert. After their marriage, Anthonypillai and Caroline went to the Hill Country to organize Tamil labor groups.

== Wartime activism ==
As an avid Trotskyist, Caroline and Anthonypillai opposed the war as an example of imperialism, and the British government cracked down on the LSSP.

In 1942, Caroline joined her husband in Madurai, India, where they continued their path of resistance. After her brother was arrested in Mumbai, Caroline fled back to Sri Lanka to protect her two children.

== Post-war activism ==
Anthonypillai and Caroline then moved back to Madurai to become union leaders. She organized many marches for the mill workers of Madurai, which led to many of the union's demands being met. As crackdowns occurred, Caroline used ingenious methods of dispensing information to subvert the crackdowns.
