= L. V. Gooneratne =

Sri Lankan politician (1894–1971)

Lionel Victor Gooneratne
- Born: 1894
- Died: 1971 (aged 77–78)
- Occupation: Teacher
- Military career
- Allegiance: Sri Lanka
- Branch: Ceylon Cadet Corps
- Rank: Major
- Commands: Ceylon Recruitment Office
- Conflicts: World War II
- Awards: Efficiency Decoration

Major Lionel Victor Gooneratne, ED (1893-1971) was a Sri Lankan educationist and a municipal councillor. He was the Chairman of the Dehiwala Urban Council and the first Mayor of Dehiwala - Mt Lavinia.

Educated at Royal College Colombo, Gooneratne entered the Training College English School before taking up a teaching position at Royal College Colombo. He served as Master at Royal College for 25 years from 1917 to 1942. Having been a cadet in his school days, Gooneratne was commissioned as a Lieutenant in 1923 in the Ceylon Cadet Battalion which was at the time part of the Ceylon Defence Force and was later promoted to captain. He served as Commanding Officer, Junior Cadets of the Cadet Battalion.

In 1942, after retiring from Royal College, he joined the regular British Army on secondment, promoted to the rank of Major and served as the Deputy Recruitment Officer, Ceylon. He was award the Efficiency Decoration on completion of ten years of service. He was a Justice of the peace.

Gooneratne was elected to the Urban Council of Dehiwala and served as its chairmen until 1961 when the council was upgraded to a Municipal Council. He became the first Mayor of Dehiwala - Mt Lavini and served in the post until his death in 1971. Gooneratne was a council member of the Royal College Union and served in the Board of Governors of the Royal College Hostel. The Major L V Gooneratne Mawatha (Avenue) in Dehiwala was named in his memory, as well as the Major L V & Mrs Rhoda Gooneratne Memorial Endowment was established at Royal College.

His younger son C. V. Gunaratne was also elected to the Dehiwala Municipal Council and later became the Cabinet Minister of Industries Development.
