= Mahadevan Sathasivam =

Sri Lankan cricketer

Personal information
- Born: 18 October 1915; Ceylon
- Died: 9 July 1977 (aged 61); Colombo
- Batting: Right-handed

Career statistics
Competition	First-class
Matches	11
Runs scored	753
Batting average	41.83
100s/50s	3/3
Top score	215
Balls bowled	84
Wickets	1
Bowling average	41.00
5 wickets in innings	0
10 wickets in match	0
Best bowling	1/8
Catches/stumpings	2/0
- Source: ESPNcricinfo, 16 April 2015

Mahadevan "Satha" Sathasivam (Tamil: மகாதேவன் சதாசிவம்) (18 October 1915, Ceylon – 9 July 1977 in Colombo, Sri Lanka), or Satha as he was known, is one of the greatest batsmen from Sri Lanka whom Garry Sobers called "the greatest batsman ever on earth," and Frank Worrell called him "the best batsman he had ever seen". He was the first, and probably the only, man to captain three national teams. Sathasivam played cricket in the 1940s through the 1960s. He was captain of the Ceylon team in 1948, and then captain of the Singapore team, and finally captain of the Malaysian team. He was accused and acquitted of murdering his wife, which gained much attention in Ceylon.

== Early life and family ==
Sathasivam was educated at St. Joseph's College and at Wesley College, Colombo. With the on set of World War II in the Far East, he was commissioned as a Second Lieutenant in the Ceylon Light Infantry as part of the war time expansion in 1940.

Sathasivam married Paripoornam Anandam Rajendra, younger daughter of Mr and Mrs Ramanathan Rajendra, a granddaughter of Sir Ponnambalam Ramanathan in 1941. Anandam Rajendra inherited substantial assets including half share of the family home "Sukhasthan" at Horton Place, Colombo 7. They had four daughters. The marriage turned out to be an unhappy one with Anandam Rajendra filling for divorce in 1944 and again in 1951, after he had started an affair with Yvonne Stevenson.

== Cricketing career ==
Sathasivam started his cricketing career in his school days, playing for St. Joseph's and later for Wesley College until 1937. He then played in the club level matches, playing for the Tamil Union Cricket and Athletic Club and later captained its team. He first played for Ceylon in 1945, when international matches started with visiting teams after the end of the war. In 1948, in a controversial decision of the Ceylon Cricket Association selected Mahadeva Sathasivam of the Tamil Union to lead the All-Ceylon XI team.

== Sathasivam murder case ==
In 1951, Sathasivam was arrested and accused of murdering his wife Paripoornam Ananda Rajendra, who was found dead at her garage adjacent to the kitchen on 9 October 1951. He was acquitted after a twenty-month sensational trial, having spent twenty-months in remand prison. He stood trial before a special jury at the Assizes Court of the Western Province, presided over by Justice Noel Gratiaen. He was acquitted by a unanimous verdict and three prosecution witnesses (a cab service manager, the driver of the cab and Mrs Sathasivam's legal advisor's son) were sentenced to jail for perjury in addition to the conviction of their servant, 18 year old Hewa Marambage William.

Sathasivam's defense team was led by Dr Colvin R de Silva and since the case had contradictory circumstantial and scientific evidence, the defense flew in renowned forensic pathologist Sir Sydney Smith from the United Kingdom, to aid in the case. Smith focused on the establishment of time of death based on the frequency of body temperature loss, degree of rigor mortis and digestion pattern of her stomach and intestine contents. Then he focused on the myriad injuries on the body and the condition of her dress, which contradicted the statement of William. The jury deliberated only a little and acquitted Sathasivam and convicted William.

== Later life ==
He later married Yvonne Stevenson in London, they had three children. Sathasivam settled in Singapore where he captained its cricket team, and then later, after that island's merger with its northern neighbour, Sathasivam led the Malaysian team as well.
