= 1934-35 malaria outbreak in Ceylon =

Malaria outbreak in Ceylon

Malaria Epidemic of 1934-35 in Ceylon
- Disease: Malaria
- Pathogen: Plasmodium sp.
- First outbreak: Ceylon
- Dates: 1934 to 1935
- Confirmed cases: 1.5 million
- Deaths: 80,000
- Fatality rate: 1.45%

The Malaria Epidemic of 1934-1935 was one of the largest Malaria epidemics Sri Lanka had experienced. The Epidemic had a major impact on Ceylon with 1.5 million people of a population of 5.5 million effected and 80,000 excess deaths over a 7-month period. The epidemic was primarily triggered by a drought that led to the failure of the monsoon rains, which in turn caused a severe rice famine and weakened the population. It was the first major crisis of the newly elected State Council of Ceylon.

== Background ==
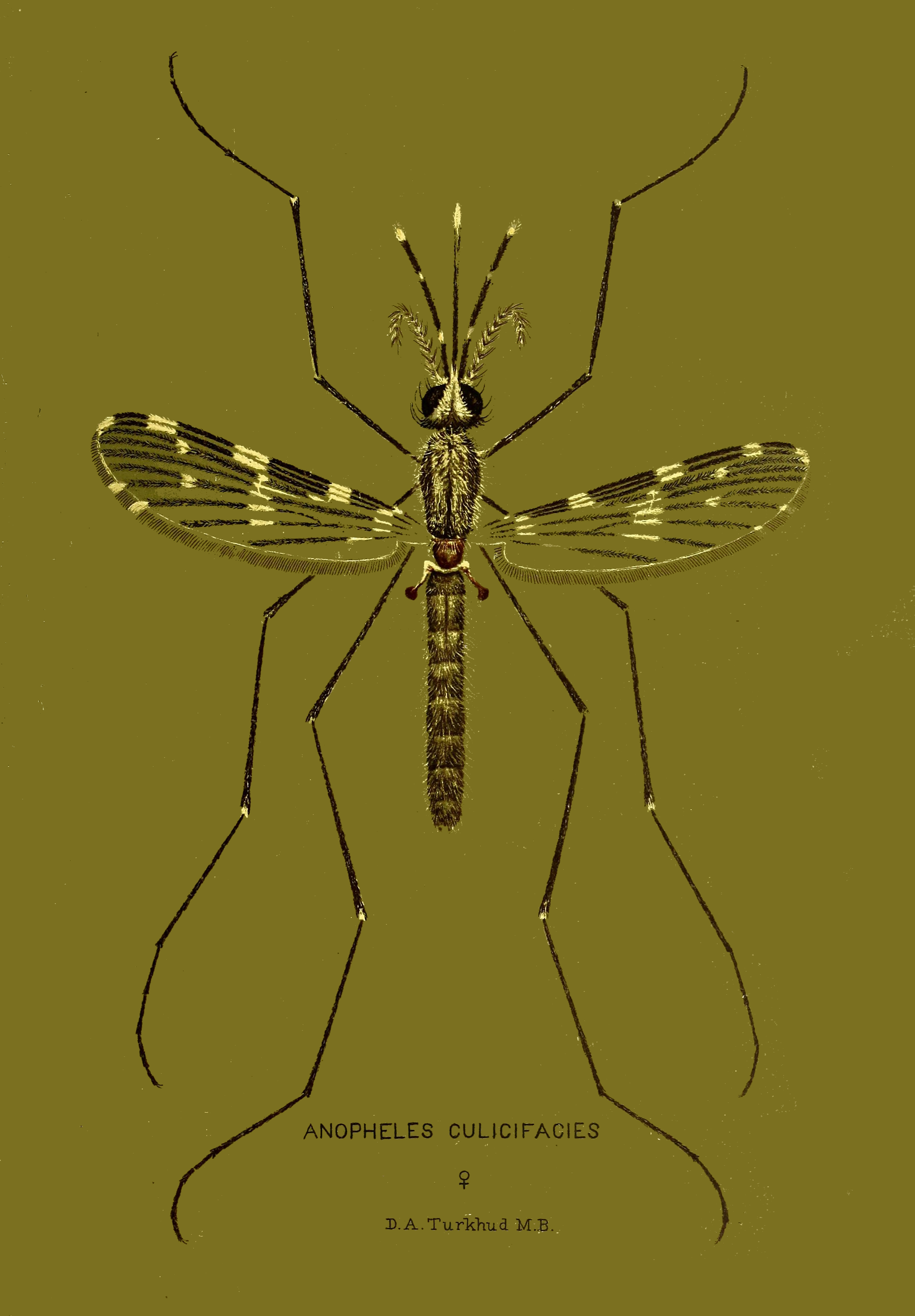
Anopheles culicifacies

Ceylon faced a major malaria outbreak in 1906, followed by outbreaks in 1914, 1919 and 1923, with the colonial government introduced an Anti-Malaria campaign in 1911. The Great Depression had a major impact on the island's economy, with many of the villagers' losing jobs in estates.

== Drought and famine ==
In 1934, South-West monsoon rains to wet zone in the South-West quadrant of the island failed, resulting in a drought from May to the first week of October. Paddy cultivations, which supplied the stable diet of rice for the island population came to a stop due to the lack of water, vegetable cultivation which the villages who had lost estate jobs took to stopped too. Coconut trees withered and broke down, while irrigation tanks ran dry, killing buffaloes from starvation in the North Central province. Poor Kandyan villages who had moved there during the depression years moved back south.

== Outbreak ==
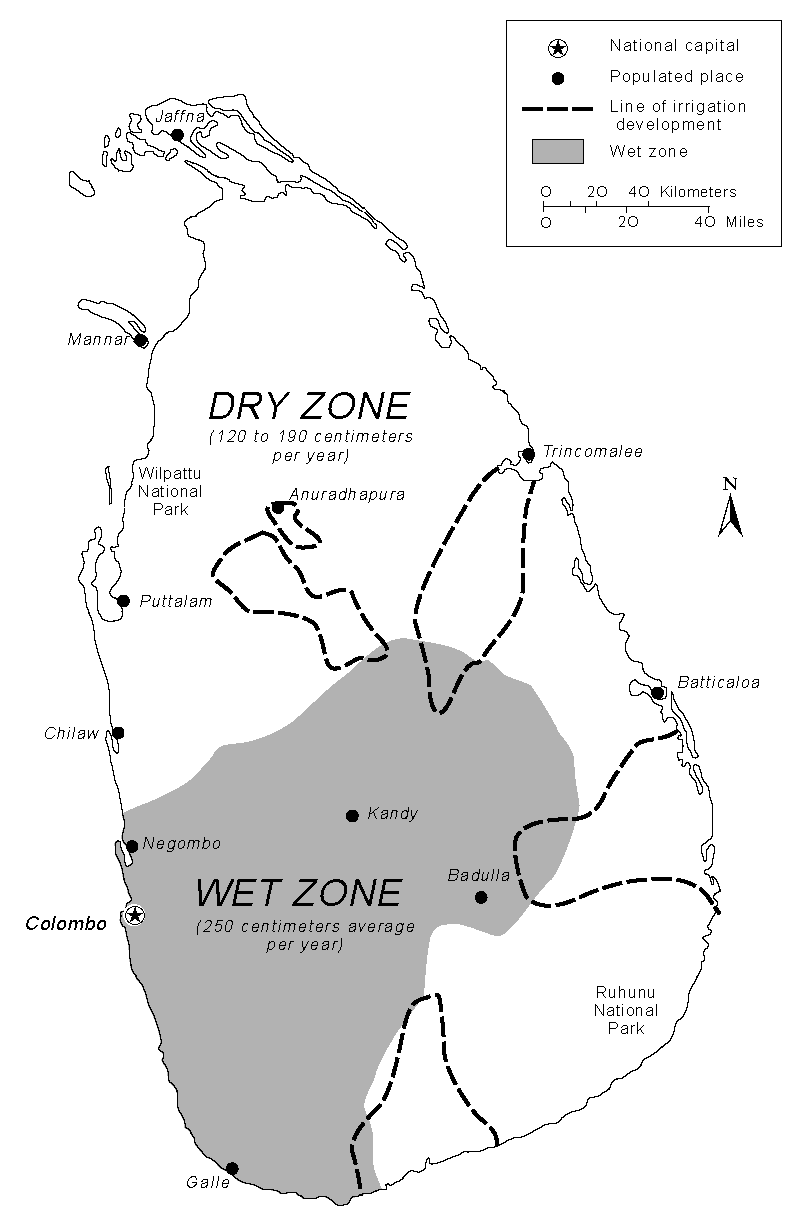
Precipitation and irrigation map of Sri Lanka.

In October there was heavy rains and minor flooding in the Kelani valley, with drier November and December. The drying up of rivers with shallow warm clear water pools, prove ideal breeding grounds for Anopheles culicifacies mosquitos that multiplied with the October rains and increased dispensary attendance was first noticed in October. Malaria which common in the dry zone, became severe than usual. Due to the harvest's failure, undernourished children and elderly people began dying. By September it had spread to Kurunegala District, going unnoticed by the authorities, despite the Medical Services had just then started a ‘resurvey of malaria incidence’ among school children. Initially the medical service recorded a sudden growth in the number of out-patients at rural dispensaries, however they were slow to realize the full extend. Government Agents who report to the Chief Secretary, were slow to take action. The epidemic was most severe in the valleys of the Kelani River, Deduru Oya, Maha Oya and their tributaries. The Ratnapura District, the Sabaragamuwa Province and the southern parts of the Western Province were moderately effected.

== Relief ==
Relief measures started in early December 1934, Kegalla, Kurunegala, Kandy, Matale and Ratnapura. At which stage the epidemic was considered a national calamity. First press reports appeared in mid-November and the issue was raised in the State Council. In the affected areas, entire families and, in some cases, even whole villages were down with fever and undernourished babies and children were carried off by hundreds.

== Impact ==
Around one-fifth of the area of the island was affected, which was close to 5,000 square-miles of the most densely populated area with 3,500,000 of the island's total population 5,500,000. In December 1934, the highest infection rate was observed ranging between 10.8–14% of the population of geographically separate regions.

== Malaria control ==
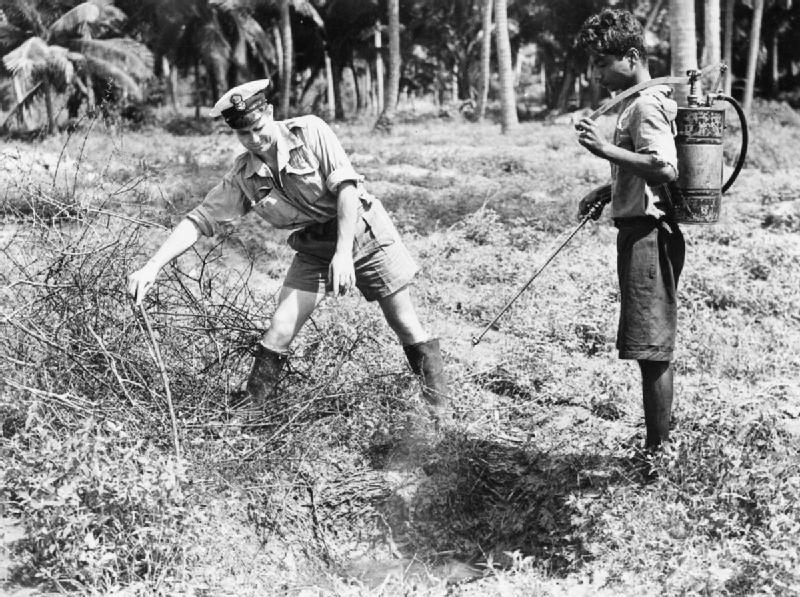
A Naval Petty Officer and coolie of the Royal Naval School of Malaria and Hygiene Control spraying DDT mixture near Colombo, Ceylon in December 1944.

The 1934-35 malaria epidemic served as a major reason to motivate the government and the public to intensify control efforts and adoption of DDT spraying in 1945, leading to a marked decline in the malaria case numbers. Indoor residual spraying, with the insecticides, DDT and malathion started in 1947 as part of the Anti-Malaria campaign and succeeded in causing a rapid decline in malaria incidence. Subsequent outbreaks in 1967–1969 and 1986–1987 due to poor vector control measures, resistance of mosquitoes and resistance of blood-stage Plasmodium parasites to drugs. In October 2012, Sri Lanka had zero locally transmitted malaria cases and zero recorded deaths since 2007 (as of 2019).

== See also ==
- 1906 malaria outbreak in Ceylon
- Dengue pandemic in Sri Lanka
