= M. A. Mansoor =

Egyptian antiquarian (1881–1968)

- Born: 1881
- Died: 1968 (aged 86–87)
- Occupation: Antiquarian

Manṣūr 'Abd al-Sayyid Manṣūr, more commonly known as M. A. Mansoor (1881–1968), was an Egyptian antiquarian who compiled a collection of Amarna Period sculptures.

== Early life and studies ==
Mansoor was born in 1881 in Cairo to Coptic Orthodox Egyptian parents. After graduating from high school, Mansoor spoke Arabic, English, and French, and thus taught Arabic to foreign officials who held principal positions in the Egyptian government for several years.

== Career ==
In October 1904, Mansoor applied to the Shepheard's Hotel in Cairo to rent two showcases in the hotel lobby, where he planned to display and sell a collection of ancient Egyptian sculptures, bronzes, amulets, faience figurines, and jewellery that he had acquired over the previous years. A year and a half later, the two showcases became a small shop in the main hall of the hotel. In later years, Mansoor opened another two shops in the Semiramis and Continental Hotels and a large gallery across the street from the Cairo Museum. Mansoor sold many important ancient works of art to museums, including the Egyptian Museum in Cairo, the Louvre, the Vatican Museum, the Metropolitan Museum of Art, the Detroit Museum, the Chicago Oriental Institute and to private collections.

== Controversies ==
In 1924, Mansoor started a collection of rare Amarna artifacts with two small Amarna heads. This grew into a collection that claims to be the world's largest private collection of Amarna artifacts. The collection was acquired by Mansoor from over 20 years from a single unnamed source. Mansoor drew controversy for his use of rock varnish as a means of authenticating his collection of limestone sculptures from Amarna.

The collection consists of portrait busts of the Amarna royal family and are in excellent condition. However, the majority of art historians, conservators, and archaeologists consider the Mansoor collection to be suspect based on style, inconsistencies with the Amarna style known from archaeological records, and the quality of the collection's make.
