= Gunawardena =

- Gender: Unisex
- Language: Sinhala

Other names
- Variant forms: Goonewardena; Goonewardene; Gunawardana; Gunawardane; Gunawardene; Gunewardene

Gunawardena is a Sinhalese surname. Notable people with the surname include:

- A. P. N. C. De S. Vaas Gunawardene (1961–1983), Sri Lankan army officer
- Amila Gunawardene (born 1980), Sri Lankan cricketer
- Arachchige Gunawardene (born 1977), Sri Lankan cricketer
- Aruna Gunawardene (born 1969), Sri Lankan cricketer
- Avishka Gunawardene (born 1977), Sri Lankan cricketer
- Bandula Gunawardane (born 1953), Sri Lankan politician
- Chathurani Gunawardene (born 1990), Sri Lankan cricketer
- Cholomondeley Goonewardene (1917–2006), Ceylonese politician
- Dayananda Gunawardena (1934–1993), Sri Lankan playwright and actor
- Deepal Gunawardene (born 1969), Sri Lankan cricketer
- Dinesh Gunawardena (born 1949), Sri Lankan politician
- Don Carlin Gunawardena (1899–1979), Ceylonese botanist and academic
- Francis Gunawardena, Sri Lankan judge of the Court of Appeal
- Gitanjana Gunawardena (born 1952), Sri Lankan politician
- Girley Gunawardana (1935–2012), Sri Lankan actress
- H. C. Goonewardene, Ceylonese civil servant
- Indika Gunawardena (1943–2015), Sri Lankan politician
- Jagath Gunawardana (born 1961), Sri Lankan environmentalist
- James Goonewardene (1921–1997), Sri Lankan writer
- Jeremy Gunawardena, American mathematician
- Kanchana Gunawardene (born 1984), Sri Lankan cricketer
- Kokila Gunawardena (born 1974), Sri Lankan politician
- Kusal Goonewardena, Australian physical therapist and health lecturer
- Kusumasiri Gunawardena (1912–1986), Ceylonese politician
- Leslie Goonewardene (1909–1983), Sri Lankan politician
- Leslie Gunawardana (1938–2010), Sri Lankan politician
- M. K. A. D. S. Gunawardana (1947–2016), Sri Lankan politician
- Makalandage Gunawardena, Sri Lankan air force officer
- Nalaka Gunawardene (born 1966), Sri Lankan writer
- Naveen Gunawardene (born 1998), Sri Lankan cricketer
- Otara Gunewardene, Sri Lankan businesswoman
- Philip Gunawardena (1901–1972), Ceylonese politician
- Prasanna Gunawardena, Sri Lankan politician
- Prishantha Gunawardena (born 1964), Sri Lankan archaeologist
- R. A. Gunawardana, Sri Lankan surveyor
- Ravindu Gunawardene (born 1997), Sri Lankan cricketer
- Robert Gunawardena, (1904–1971), Ceylonese politician
- Sajin Vass Gunawardena (born 1973), Sri Lankan politician
- Sarana Gunawardena (born 1964), Sri Lankan politician
- Sarath Gunawardena (1949–2003), Sri Lankan politician
- Senerat Gunewardene (1899–1981), Ceylonese diplomat and politician
- Sunil Gunawardene (born 1949), Sri Lankan athlete
- Tharaka Gunawardena (born 1995), Sri Lankan cricketer
- Thelma Gunawardena (1934–2015), Sri Lankan museum director
- Trilicia Gunawardena (1934–1999), Sri Lankan actress
- Vivienne Goonewardene (1916–1996), Sri Lankan politician
- Yadamini Gunawardena, Sri Lankan politician
