= Ministry of Fisheries (Sri Lanka) =

Government ministry of Sri Lanka

- ධීවර අමාත්‍යාංශය கடற்றொழில் அமைச்சு

Ministry overview
- Formed: 1947; 79 years ago
- Jurisdiction: Government of Sri Lanka
- Headquarters: New Secretariat, Sevana Mawatha, Maligawatta, Colombo; 6°55′52.90″N 79°52′02.10″E
- Annual budget: Rs. 2 billion (2016, recurrent); Rs. 3 billion (2016, capital)
- Minister responsible: Ramalingam Chandrasekar, Minister of Fisheries
- Ministry executive: K.D.S. Ruwanchandra, Secretary
- Child agencies: Ceylon Fisheries Corporation; Ceylon Fishery Harbours Corporation; Cey-Nor Foundation Limited; Department of Fisheries and Aquatic Resources; National Aquaculture Development Authority; National Aquatic Resources Research and Development Agency
- Website: fisheries.gov.lk

The Ministry of Fisheries (Sinhala: ධීවර අමාත්‍යාංශය; Tamil: கடற்றொழில் அமைச்சு) is the central government ministry of Sri Lanka responsible for fisheries. The ministry is responsible for formulating and implementing national policy on fisheries and aquatic resources development and other subjects which come under its purview. The current Minister of Fisheries is Ramalingam Chandrasekar. The current secretary to the ministry is K.D.S. Ruwanchandra.

== Ministers ==
The Minister of Fisheries is a member of the Cabinet of Sri Lanka.

Parties

Independent United National Party All Ceylon Tamil Congress Viplavakari Lanka Sama Samaja Party Sri Lanka Freedom Party Mahajana Eksath Peramuna Democratic National Movement Eelam People's Democratic Party National People's Power

Ministers of Fisheries
| Name | Portrait | Party | Took office | Left office | Head of government | Ministerial title | Refs |
|---|---|---|---|---|---|---|---|
| George E. de Silva | | United National Party | 26 September 1947 | 1948 | D. S. Senanayake | Minister of Industries, Industrial Research and Fisheries | |
| C. Sittampalam | | Independent | 1948 | 1948 | D. S. Senanayake | Minister of Industries, Industrial Research and Fisheries | |
| G. G. Ponnambalam | | All Ceylon Tamil Congress | 3 September 1948 | | D. S. Senanayake | Minister of Industries, Industrial Research and Fisheries | |
| G. G. Ponnambalam | | All Ceylon Tamil Congress | 19 June 1952 | | Dudley Senanayake | Minister of Industries and Fisheries | |
| G. G. Ponnambalam | | All Ceylon Tamil Congress | | 22 October 1953 | John Kotelawala | Minister of Industries and Fisheries | |
| William de Silva | | Viplavakari Lanka Sama Samaja Party | | 18 May 1959 | S. W. R. D. Bandaranaike | Minister of Industries and Fisheries | |
| W. J. C. Munasinha | | Sri Lanka Freedom Party | 9 June 1959 | | S. W. R. D. Bandaranaike | Minister of Industries and Fisheries | |
| W. J. C. Munasinha | | Sri Lanka Freedom Party | | | W. Dahanayake | Minister of Industries and Fisheries | |
| Philip Gunawardena | | Mahajana Eksath Peramuna | March 1965 | | Dudley Senanayake | Minister of Industries and Fisheries | |
| George Rajapaksa | | Sri Lanka Freedom Party | | | Sirimavo Bandaranaike | Minister of Fisheries | |
| S. de S. Jayasinghe | | United National Party | | 26 September 1977 | J. R. Jayewardene | Minister of Fisheries | |
| Festus Perera | | United National Party | 23 July 1977 | | J. R. Jayewardene | Minister of Fisheries | |
| M. Joseph Michael Perera | | United National Party | 18 February 1989 | | Ranasinghe Premadasa | Minister of Fisheries and Aquatic Research | |
| Indika Gunawardena | | Sri Lanka Freedom Party | 19 August 1994 | | D. B. Wijetunga | Minister of Fisheries and Aquatic Research | |
| Mahinda Rajapaksa | | Sri Lanka Freedom Party | 19 October 2000 | 14 September 2001 | Chandrika Kumaratunga | Minister of Fisheries and Aquatic Resources Development | |
| Mahinda Rajapaksa | | Sri Lanka Freedom Party | 14 September 2001 | | Chandrika Kumaratunga | Minister of Ports, Shipping and Fisheries | |
| Mahinda Wijesekara | | United National Party | 12 December 2001 | | Chandrika Kumaratunga | Minister of Fisheries and Ocean Resources | |
| Felix Perera | | Sri Lanka Freedom Party | 28 January 2007 | | Mahinda Rajapaksa | Minister of Fisheries and Aquatic Resources | |
| Rajitha Senaratne | | Democratic National Movement | 23 April 2010 | | Mahinda Rajapaksa | Minister of Fisheries and Aquatic Resources Development | |
| M. Joseph Michael Perera | | United National Party | 12 January 2015 | 22 March 2015 | Maithripala Sirisena | Minister of Home Affairs and Fisheries | |
| Mahinda Amaraweera | | Sri Lanka Freedom Party | 22 March 2015 | 26 October 2018 | Maithripala Sirisena | Minister of Fisheries and Aquatic Resources Development | |
| Gamini Vijith Vijithamuni Soysa | | Sri Lanka Freedom Party | 29 October 2018 | 15 December 2018 | Maithripala Sirisena | Minister of Fisheries, Aquatic Resources Development and Rural Economic Affairs | |
| P. Harrison | | United National Party | 20 December 2018 | 29 May 2019 | Maithripala Sirisena | Minister of Agriculture, Rural Economic Affairs, Livestock Development, Irrigation, Fisheries and Aquatic Resources Development | |
| Douglas Devananda | | Eelam People's Democratic Party | 22 November 2019 | 24 September 2024 | Gotabaya Rajapaksa | Minister of Fisheries and Aquatic Resources | |
| Douglas Devananda | | Eelam People's Democratic Party | 22 November 2019 | 24 September 2024 | Ranil Wickremesinghe | Minister of Fisheries | |
| Anura Kumara Dissanayake | | National People's Power | 24 September 2024 | 18 November 2024 | Anura Kumara Dissanayake | Minister of Agriculture, Land, Livestock, Irrigation, Fisheries and Aquatic Resources | |
| Ramalingam Chandrasekar | | National People's Power | 18 November 2024 | Incumbent | Anura Kumara Dissanayake | Minister of Fisheries, Aquatic and Ocean Resources | |

== Secretaries ==
Fisheries Secretaries
| Name | Took office | Left office | Title | Refs |
|---|---|---|---|---|
| A. Damitha N. de Zoysa | 25 April 2010 | | Fisheries and Aquatic Resources Development Secretary | |
| S. D. A. B. Borelessa | 19 January 2015 | | Home Affairs and Fisheries Secretary | |
| W. M. M. R. Adikari | 8 September 2015 | | Labour and Trade Union Relations Secretary | |
