= Avissawella Electoral District =

Electoral district of Sri Lanka

Coordinates: 6.9531°N 80.2183°E

Avissawella electoral district was an electoral district of Sri Lanka between August 1947 and February 1989. The district was named after the town of Avissawella in Colombo District, Western Province. The 1978 Constitution of Sri Lanka introduced the proportional representation electoral system for electing members of Parliament. The existing 160 mainly single-member electoral districts were replaced with 22 multi-member electoral districts. Avissawella electoral district was replaced by the Colombo multi-member electoral district at the 1989 general elections, the first under the PR system, though Avissawella continues to be a polling division of the multi-member electoral district.

== Members of Parliament ==
Key

Independent MEP Viplavakari Lanka Sama Samaja Party LSSP SLFP

Election	Member	Party	Term
1947	Philip Gunawardena	Lanka Sama Samaja Party	1947-1948
1948 by-election	Kusumasiri Gunawardena	Lanka Sama Samaja Party	1948-1952
1952	Kusumasiri Gunawardena	Viplavakari Lanka Sama Samaja Party	1952-1956
1956	Philip Gunawardena	Viplavakari Lanka Sama Samaja Party	1956-1960
1960	Philip Gunawardena	Mahajana Eksath Peramuna	1960-1960
1960	Philip Gunawardena	Mahajana Eksath Peramuna	1960-1965
1965	Philip Gunawardena	Mahajana Eksath Peramuna	1965-1970
1970	Bonnie Jayasuriya	Sri Lanka Freedom Party	1970-1977
1977	M. D. Premaratne	United National Party	1977-1989

== Elections ==
=== 1947 Parliamentary general election ===
Results of the 1st parliamentary election held between 23 August 1947 and 20 September 1947 for the district:

Candidate	Party	Symbol	Votes	%
Philip Gunawardena	Lanka Sama Samaja Party	Hand	17,598	74.78
Bernard Jayasuriya		Elephant	5,676	24.12
Valid Votes			23,274	98.90
Rejected Votes			259	0.11
Total Polled			23,533	100.00
Registered Electors			50,009	
Turnout				47.06

=== 1948 Parliamentary by-election ===
Results of the 1948 parliamentary by-election, at which Kusumasiri Gunawardena was elected unopposed:

Candidate	Party	Symbol	Votes	%
Kusumasiri Gunawardena			-	-
Valid Votes			-	-
Rejected Votes			-	-
Total Polled			-	-
Registered Electors			50,009	
Turnout				-

=== 1952 Parliamentary general election ===
Results of the 2nd parliamentary election held between 24 May 1952 and 30 May 1952 for the district:

Candidate	Party	Symbol	Votes	%
Kusumasiri Gunawardena		Elephant	19,414	50.75
Clodagh Jayasuriya		Hand	18,485	48.32
Valid Votes			37,899	99.06
Rejected Votes			358	0.94
Total Polled			38,257	100.00
Registered Electors			52,507	
Turnout				72.86

=== 1956 Parliamentary general election ===
Results of the 3rd parliamentary election held between 5 April 1956 and 10 April 1956 for the district:

Candidate	Party	Symbol	Votes	%
Philip Gunawardena		Hand	30,070	78.33
Clodagh Jayasuriya		Elephant	7,818	20.36
H. M. S. Jayawardhana		Bicycle	258	0.67
Valid Votes			38,146	99.36
Rejected Votes			244	0.64
Total Polled			38,390	100.00
Registered Electors			59,267	
Turnout				64.77

=== 1960 (March) Parliamentary general election ===
Results of the 4th parliamentary election held on 19 March 1960 for the district:

Candidate	Party	Symbol	Votes	%
Philip Gunawardena	Mahajana Eksath Peramuna	Cartwheel	16,648	59.72
Ariyadasa Jayawardena	United National Party	Elephant	10,395	37.29
Neville de Jacolyn		Umbrella	657	2.36
Valid Votes			27,700	99.37
Rejected Votes			175	0.63
Total Polled			27,875	100.00
Registered Electors			33,589	
Turnout				82.99

=== 1960 (July) Parliamentary general election ===
Results of the 5th parliamentary election held on 20 July 1960 for the district:

Candidate	Party	Symbol	Votes	%
Philip Gunawardena	Mahajana Eksath Peramuna	Cartwheel	13,295	50.20
Ariyadasa Jayawardena	United National Party	Elephant	10,600	40.02
R. P. Jayawardena	Sri Lanka Freedom Party	Hand	2,482	9.37
Valid Votes			26,377	99.59
Rejected Votes			108	0.41
Total Polled			26,485	100.00
Registered Electors			33,589	
Turnout				78.85

=== 1965 Parliamentary general election ===
Results of the 6th parliamentary election held on 22 March 1965 for the district:

Candidate	Party	Symbol	Votes	%
Philip Gunawardena	Mahajana Eksath Peramuna	Cartwheel	22,093	66.80
Soma Wickramanayake	Sri Lanka Freedom Party	Hand	10,766	32.55
Valid Votes			32,859	99.34
Rejected Votes			217	0.65
Total Polled			33,076	100.00
Registered Electors			40,902	
Turnout				80.87

=== 1970 Parliamentary general election ===
Results of the 7th parliamentary election held on 27 May 1970 for the district:

Candidate	Party	Symbol	Votes	%
Bonnie Jayasuriya	Sri Lanka Freedom Party	Hand	19,687	48.77
Philip Gunawardena	Mahajana Eksath Peramuna	Cartwheel	17,661	43.75
Siripala Padukka		Chair	2,883	7.14
Valid Votes			40,231	99.67
Rejected Votes			134	0.33
Total Polled			40,365	100.00
Registered Electors			46,402	
Turnout				86.99%

=== 1977 Parliamentary general election ===
Results of the 8th parliamentary election held on 21 July 1977 for the district:

Candidate	Party	Symbol	Votes	%
M. D. Premaratne	United National Party	Elephant	23,812	49.53
Dinesh Gunawardena	Mahajana Eksath Peramuna	Cartwheel	17,897	37.23
W. P. Senanayake	Sri Lanka Freedom Party	Hand	4,762	9.91
Chandrapala Kumarage		Key	1,187	2.47
Don Pemaratne Thillakaratne		Pair of Scales	282	0.59
Valid Votes			47,940	99.71
Rejected Votes			138	0.29
Total Polled			48,078	100.00
Registered Electors			54,375	
Turnout				88.42
