= Kiriella Electoral District =

Electoral district of Sri Lanka

Kiriella electoral district was an electoral district of Sri Lanka between August 1947 and July 1977. The district was named after the town of Kiriella in Ratnapura District, Sabaragamuwa Province. The 1978 Constitution of Sri Lanka introduced the proportional representation electoral system for electing members of Parliament. The existing 160 mainly single-member electoral districts were replaced with 22 multi-member electoral districts. Kiriella electoral district was replaced by the Ratnapura multi-member electoral district at the 1989 general elections, the first under the proportional representation system.

== Members of Parliament ==
Key

Independent SLFP UNP LSSP

Election	Member	Party	Term
1947	Florence Senanayake	LSSP	1947-52
1952	A. E. B. Kiriella	UNP	1952-1956
1956	Kusumasiri Gunawardena	VLSSP	1956-1960
1960 (March)	A. E. B. Kiriella	UNP	1960
1960 (July)	P. B. Wijayasundara	LSSP	1960-1965
1965	P. B. Wijayasundara	LSSP	1965-1970
1970	Vasudeva Nanayakkara	LSSP	1970-1977

== Elections ==
=== 1947 Parliamentary General Election ===
Results of the 1st parliamentary election held between 23 August 1947 and 20 September 1947:

Candidate	Party	Symbol	Votes	%
Florence Senanayake	Lanka Sama Samaja Party	Umbrella	5,535	35.52
T. K. W. Chandrasekera	United National Party	Butterfly	3,294	21.14
A. E. B. Kiriella	United National Party	Tree	2,439	15.65
H. A. G. Kalatuwawa	Independent	Pineapple	2,428	15.58
B. S. Ramachandra	Independent	Scales	1,120	7.19
A. M. S. L. Patani Muhandiram		Chair	366	2.35
Valid Votes			15,182	97.44
Rejected Votes			399	2.56
Total Polled			15,581	100.00
Registered Electors			30,307	
Turnout				51.41

=== 1952 Parliamentary General Election ===
Results of the 2nd parliamentary election held between 24 May 1952 and 30 May 1952:

Candidate	Party	Symbol	Votes	%
A. E. B. Kiriella	United National Party	Chair	9,978	47.99
Jayaweera Kuruppu	Sri Lanka Freedom Party	Umbrella	7,369	35.44
Florence Senanayake	Lanka Sama Samaja Party	Star	3,192	15.35
Valid Votes			20,539	98.79
Rejected Votes			251	1.21
Total Polled			20,790	100.00
Registered Electors			29,037	
Turnout				69.79

=== 1956 Parliamentary General Election ===
Results of the 3rd parliamentary election held between 5 April 1956 and 10 April 1956:

Candidate	Party	Symbol	Votes	%
Kusumasiri Gunawardena	Viplavakari Lanka Sama Samaja Party	Hand	16,272	68.43
A. E. B. Kiriella	United National Party	Elephant	6,309	26.53
H. Chandrapala Gunasekera	Lanka Sama Samaja Party	Key	1,011	4.25
Valid Votes			23,592	99.22
Rejected Votes			186	0.78
Total Polled			23,778	100.00
Registered Electors			33,008	
Turnout				72.04

=== 1960 (March) Parliamentary General Election ===
Results of the 4th parliamentary election held on 19 March 1960:

Candidate	Party	Symbol	Votes	%
A. E. B. Kiriella	United National Party	Elephant	6,816	32.65
P. B. Wijesundara	Lanka Sama Samaja Party	Key	5,270	25.25
W. L. D. Jayawardena	Sri Lanka Freedom Party	Hand	4,654	22.30
Kusumasiri Gunawardena	Mahajana Eksath Peramuna	Cartwheel	3,906	18.71
H. Attanayake	Independent	Umbrella	131	0.63
Valid Votes			20,777	99.53
Rejected Votes			98	0.47
Total Polled			20,875	100.00
Registered Electors			26,106	
Turnout				79.96

=== 1960 (July) Parliamentary General Election ===
Results of the 5th parliamentary election held on 20 July 1960:

Candidate	Party	Symbol	Votes	%
P. B. Wijesundara	Lanka Sama Samaja Party	Key	10,708	53.58
A. E. B. Kiriella	United National Party	Elephant	8,230	41.18
D. C. P. Beneragama	Mahajana Eksath Peramuna	Cartwheel	984	4.92
Valid Votes			19,922	99.67
Rejected Votes			65	0.33
Total Polled			19,987	100.00
Registered Electors			26,106	
Turnout				76.56

=== 1965 Parliamentary General Election ===
Results of the 6th parliamentary election held on 22 March 1965:

Candidate	Party	Symbol	Votes	%
P. B. Wijayasundara	Lanka Sama Samaja Party	Key	13,887	51.20
A. E. B. Kiriella	United National Party	Elephant	11,620	42.84
H. A. Premaratne	Mahajana Eksath Peramuna	Cartwheel	1,167	4.30
U. D. Kulasinghe		Sun	334	1.23
Valid Votes			27,008	99.58
Rejected Votes			115	0.42
Total Polled			27,123	100.00
Registered Electors			32,011	
Turnout				84.73

=== 1970 Parliamentary General Election ===
Results of the 7th parliamentary election held on 27 May 1970:

Candidate	Party	Symbol	Votes	%
Vasudeva Nanayakkara	Lanka Sama Samaja Party	Key	19,158	58.72
Leonard Kiriella	United National Party	Elephant	12,975	39.77
A. E. B. Kiriella	Independent	Chair	300	0.92
Arthur Daundasekera	Samajawadi Mahajana Peramuna	Bell	153	0.47
Valid Votes			32,586	99.88
Rejected Votes			39	0.12
Total Polled			32,625	100.00
Registered Electors			36,789	
Turnout				88.68
