= Clodagh Jayasuriya =

Ceylonese politician

Clodagh Jayasuriya, MBE, (née Jayewardene) was a Ceylonese politician and the first female to be elected to the Senate of Ceylon.

Clodagh Jayewardene was the only child of John Adrian St. Valentine Jayewardene (1877–1927), a lawyer and Supreme Court judge, and Ethel Charlotte Irene née Dissanayake, daughter of Mudaliyar Francis William Tillekeratne Dissanayake.

In 1945 she married Bernard Jayasuriya, a member of the State Council of Ceylon between February 1943 and 1947, who contested the seat of Avissawella at the 1st parliamentary election held in late 1947. He was unsuccessful in his attempt, losing to Philip Gunawardena by almost 12,000 votes.

Following Bernard's death, Coldagh entered local politics becoming the chair of the Hanwella Peruwa Village Council. At the 2nd parliamentary election in 1952, she ran in the Avissawella electorate as the United National Party candidate, where she narrowly lost to Gunawardena's wife, Kusumasiri by 929 votes.

Jayasuriya was elected to the Senate of Ceylon in October 1953 and resigned her seat in 1956. In January 1956 she was awarded a Member of the Order of the British Empire (MBE). Jayasuriya ran again in the subsequent 1956 parliamentary elections for Avisssawella, where she lost to Philip Gunawardena by 22,252 votes.
