= Glendale Bungalow =

- Former names: Royal College, Colombo; Royal Preparatory School
- Alternative names: Royal College, Colombo (Bandarawela)

General information
- Location: Bandarawela, Sri Lanka
- Client: Bandarawela Central College

Glendale Bungalow was a country house near Bandarawela, Sri Lanka. It is now part of the Bandarawela Central College.

== History ==
In 1942 following the bombing of Colombo by the Imperial Japanese Navy, school children where evacuated from Colombo to safer inland locations. Many of the prominent schools of Colombo were relocated to Bandarawela, this included forms 1 - 3 of Royal College, Colombo were moved from a temporary premises in a bungalow on Turret Road, Colombo to the Glendale Bungalow in Bandarawela. Later in 1944, the Royal Preparatory School was also shifted to Glendale. The school functioned as the Bandarawela branch of Royal College, Colombo until May 1946, when the classes were moved back to Colombo. The branch school continued operations for a further two years before it was formally closed in 1948.

After the departure of Royal College, a new school was established at the vacant premises. Glendale along with 11 hectares (26 acres) of surrounding land given to the new school by Mr Hoak. In 1954, prime minister Sir John Kotelawala declared the college main hall and two storied building opened, and in 1958 it was named as Bandarawela Senior School. After 1972 it became the Bandarawela Central College (Bandarwela Madya Maha Vidyalaya).

== See also ==
- Obeyesekere Walawa
- Royal College, Colombo
- Royal Preparatory School
