= Royal Preparatory School =

- Colombo; Ceylon

Information
- Type: Preparatory school
- Established: 1933
- Affiliation: Royal College Colombo

Royal Preparatory School (also known as Royal Primary School or Royal Junior School) was a preparatory school in Colombo, Ceylon (now Sri Lanka). Its grounds and buildings now form the primary school of the Royal College Colombo.

== History ==
It was established in 1933 as a preparatory school to prepare students for admission to the Royal College Colombo which was situated next to it (until the 1960s there was an entrance exam for its students). In 1944 it was moved to the Glendale Bungalow in Bandarawela (current Bandarawela Central College), where it remained until 1948.

From 1966 to 1969, Royal Primary School Hall was built specially designed for local drama and music which required an open-air type auditorium in accordance with Natya Shastra. On 2 March 1972, Ceylon became a republic when the new Republican Constitution was passed by the Parliament that met at the Royal Primary School Hall.

The school was augmented with Royal College Colombo in December 1977, becoming the Primary School of Royal College Colombo which exists to this day. The school was a government administered school with its own head master; the post still exists as the post of head master/mistress of the Primary School staffed by a Deputy Principal of Royal College, Colombo.

== Notable alumni ==
| Name | Year/degree | Notability | Reference |
|---|---|---|---|
| Ranil Wickremesinghe | | President 2022–present Prime Minister 2022–2022,2018–2019,2015–2018, 2011–2004, 1993–1994), member parliament - Colombo (1994–present), Gampaha (1989–1994), Biyagama (1997–1989) | |
| David de Kretser | | Governor of Victoria (Australia) (2006–2011) | |
| Anura Bandaranaike | | member parliament - Nuwara Eliya-Maskeliya (1977–1989) | |
| Dinesh Gunawardena | | member parliament - Colombo (1989–1994, 2000–present), Maharagama (1983–1989) | |
| Anil Moonesinghe | | member parliament - Agalawatte (1956–1970) | |
| Susil Moonesinghe | | Chief Minister of Western Province (1998–1993), member parliament - Colombo (1994–2000) | |
| C. V. Gunaratne | | member parliament - Colombo (1989–2000) | |
| Mohan Lal Grero | | member parliament - Colombo (2010–present) | |
| Dav Whatmore | | international test cricketer (Australia) (1979) | |
| Lalith Athulathmudali | | member parliament - Colombo (1989-1993), Ratmalana (1977-1989) | |

== Other schools ==
In 1948, the Bandarawela Senior School (current Bandarawela Central College) was established on the premises used by the school in Bandarawela during World War II after it moved back to Colombo that year.

After the war, then Minister of Education Major E. A. Nugawela opened the Government Senior School (current Thurstan College) in 1950 at Thurstan Road; which was created to "accommodate the overflow of students [of] Royal Primary who could not gain admission to Royal College". 112 students who could not gain admission to Royal College Colombo along with 26 other students were enrolled at the new Senior Government School.

In 1952 Greenlands College (current Isipathana College) at Greenlands Road was established with partial intake of students from Royal Preparatory School.

== See also ==
- Thurstan College
- Isipathana College
- Bandarawela Central College
