= Princess of Wales' College =

Location
- Moratuwa; Sri Lanka
- Coordinates: 6.785199°N 79.8827°E

Information
- Type: Public School (Secondary School / College up to University Entrance)
- Motto: ICH DIEN, NIHIL PER SALTUM (Aloko Udapadi) (Not at a leap, I serve)
- Established: 1876
- Founder: Sir Charles Henry de Soysa
- Principal: M. Samarakoon
- Grades: Class 1 – 13
- Gender: Girls
- Age: 5 to 19
- Enrollment: 4,000+
- Colors: Purple, gold and maroon
- Website: http://www.princess.sch.lk/

Princess of Wales' College is a girls' school in Sri Lanka, situated in Moratuwa, a suburb of Colombo. Princess of Wales' College was founded in 1876 by Sir Charles Henry de Soysa who was a famous 19th-century Sri Lankan philanthropist. The school was named in honour of Alexandra, Princess of Wales

As of 2014, over 4000 girls are studying in the school from grade 1 to 13 including all main streams of secondary studies which include biology, mathematics, commerce and arts. Currently there are 138 teachers in school

== History ==
By the end of the 19th century, only a few schools in Sri Lanka offered higher education and most of them were limited to Colombo. The inception of Prince of Wales' and Princess of Wales' schools can be considered as a special reward to the children of the Moratuwa area. The founder of the school was the great philanthropist, Sir Charles Henry de Soysa. Following the arrival of the then Prince of Wales (Edward VII) in Colombo in 1875, Sir Charles Henry De Soysa felt like naming the two schools he intended to build as Prince of Wales’ and Princess of Wales’. As a result of a letter sent on 27 November 1875, he received permission to name the two schools as Prince of Wales’ and Princess of Wales’. At its inauguration, it was by far the largest girls' school in Ceylon and offered a secular education.

=== Padma Jinasena (1974 - 1980) ===
Mrs Padma Jinasena, (B.A. Dip in Ed.) from 1974 to 1980. During her period of office, she had to face several changes. The existing examinations were replaced by the National Certificate of education.

In 1976 students were presented for the First time for home science at the Advanced Level Examination. Selected for University was done on a district basis. The college was included in the Colombo District and the students had to face stiff competition from all the Colombo schools. Nevertheless, at least some of them gained admission to the university, every year, and many gained passes in all four subjects.

During this period, the college obtained the best result in both G.C.E (Ordinary Level) and in the G.C.E. (Advanced Level) Examinations in the Moratuwa circuit, and was awarded the Proficiency Shield for same. Pupils were now admitted to Grade 6 and to the Advanced Level forms.

The Hewisi Band was also formed during this period and contributed to adding much colour to all the activities of the college. The western band too was afforded the privilege of being one of the bands to play at the opening of the 5th Summit of the Non-Aligned Movement held in August 1976. The college showed in the spheres of sports and athletics and won several competitions.

In 1976 several activities were organised jointly with the Prince of Wales’ College, to celebrate the centenary of the twin colleges; Among these were religious activities, a public meeting, the issues of the Centenary Magazine and a dinner.

=== Sriya Peiris (1980 - 1986) ===
Mrs Jinadasa was succeeded by Mrs Sriya Peiris, Who had been a teacher of the College for a short period. Having been an Inspectress of Schools of Schools in Science, she made every effort to develop the Science section in the College. In 1984 the College won a Competition held for Colombo Schools, and was awarded a gold Medal for its Project, “A Study of the Lunawa Lagoon”.

During this period, “Years Heads” were appointed in addition to the Sectional Heads. In 1984, the college presented an Art Exhibition at Alliance Francais in Colombo.

1985 saw the first sponsored walk held in the open in Sri Lanka, which started from Pirivena road, Mount Lavinia, up to the Moratuwa clock Tower and back to the college. Special permission had to be obtained from the Education Minister to enable the one hundred participants, mainly school children to be allowed to walk on the Galle Road.

During this time the foundation was laid, and the first floor of the three-storied building, in front of the main building, had been completed funds for this purpose were made available through the offices of Mr Tyrone Fernando, who was at that time the member of parliament for Moratuwa. The College is grateful to him, for taking a keen interest in the program of the school, throughout his tenure of office. The Proceeds from the sponsored walk were used to secure the new building with doors and windows and make it functional to conduct classes.

== Notable alumni ==
Name	Notability	Reference
Ruby de Mel	actress	
Lady Evelyn de Soysa	member of Senate of Ceylon (1959-1963)	
Malinee Peris	concert pianist	
Florence Senanayake	first female Member of Parliament (Kiriella 1947–1952)	

== See also ==
- Education in Sri Lanka
