= Kusumasiri Gunawardena =

Ceylonese politician

Hon. Kusumasiri Gunawardena

Member of the Ceylon Parliament for Avissawella
- In office 1948–1956
- Preceded by: Philip Gunawardena
- Succeeded by: Philip Gunawardena

Member of the Ceylon Parliament for Kiriella
- In office 1956–1960
- Preceded by: A. E. B. Kiriella
- Succeeded by: A. E. B. Kiriella

Personal details
- Born: Kusumasiri Amarasinghe; 26 May 1912 Medaketiya (Tangalle)
- Died: 30 May 1986 (aged 74)
- Party: Lanka Sama Samaja Party
- Other political affiliations: Viplavakari Lanka Sama Samaja Party
- Spouse: Philip Gunawardena
- Children: 5, including Indika, Prasanna, Dinesh, Gitanjana
- Education: Rahula Maha Vidyalaya, Tangalle, St. Mary's Convent Matara, Musaeus College, Colombo
- Occupation: Politician

Kusumasiri Gunawardena (née Amarasinghe) (1912–1986) was a Ceylonese politician.

== Early life, education and political career ==
Kusumasiri was born in Medaketiya (Tangalle) on 26 May 1912, the daughter of Don Davith Amarasinghe and Sophinona. She was educated at Rahula Maha Vidyalaya, Tangalle, St. Mary's Convent Matara and Musaeus College, Colombo. She later participated in the Suriya Mal movement and joined the Lanka Sama Samaja Party.

On 30 June 1939 she married Philip Gunawardena, one of the founders of the Lanka Sama Samaja Party. During the Second World War, when her husband escaped from detention in Ceylon to India, she followed in disguise. They were both later arrested by Indian police in 1943 and after several months deported back to Ceylon.

In 1947 Phillip was elected at 1st parliamentary election as the member for Avissawella, representing the Lanka Sama Samaja Party. In 1948 however he was dismissed from parliament due to his involvement in the General Strike in 1947, losing his civic rights for seven years. He was replaced by Kusumasiri, who was elected unopposed in the 1948 by-election, making her the second elected female Member of Parliament in Sri Lanka. She retained the seat at the 2nd parliamentary elections in 1952, representing the Viplavakari Lanka Sama Samaja Party. She did not contest the seat of Avissawella following 1956 parliamentary elections in favour of her husband, instead she contested and won the seat of Kiriella Electoral District. She failed to retain the seat at the March 1960 parliamentary elections. She then unsuccessfully contested the seat of Dehiowita Electoral District in the July 1960 parliamentary elections, polling third behind Soma Wickremanayake and A. F. Wijemanne.

As a member of parliament she campaigned for equal treatment of women, pushing for women to be recruited to the civil service and be appointed to senior positions in government departments.

== Legacy ==
Her eldest son, Indika, was a member of parliament and a cabinet member, her second son, Prasanna, was the Mayor of Colombo between 2002 and 2006, her third son, Dinesh, served as the prime minister of Sri Lanka from 2022 to 2024, representing the Colombo Electoral District and the current leader of the Mahajana Eksath Peramuna (MEP), whilst her fourth son, Gitanjana was also a member of parliament and a deputy minister. One of her grandsons, Yadamini Gunawardena, is also a member of parliament.
