= Maharagama Electoral District =

Electoral district of Sri Lanka

Maharagama Electoral District was an electoral district of Sri Lanka between July 1977 and February 1989. The district was named after the town of Maharagama in Colombo District, Western Province. The 1978 Constitution of Sri Lanka introduced the proportional representation electoral system for electing members of Parliament. The existing 160 mainly single-member electoral districts were replaced with 22 multi-member electoral districts. Maharagama electoral district was replaced by the Colombo multi-member electoral district at the 1989 general elections, the first under the PR system, though Maharagama continues to be a polling division of the multi-member electoral district.

== Members of Parliament ==
Key

Independent SLFP UNP

Election	Member	Party	Term
1977	Premaratne Gunasekera	United National Party	1977-1983
By-Election 1983	Dinesh Gunawardena	Mahajana Eksath Peramuna	1983-1989

== Elections ==
=== 1977 Parliamentary General Election ===
Results of the 8th parliamentary election held on 21 July 1977 for the district:

Candidate	Party	Symbol	Votes	%
Premarathne Gunasekera	United National Party	Elephant	24,950	51.69%
Stanley Tillekeratne	Sri Lanka Freedom Party	Hand	18,233	37.78%
D.L.Pathirage	Lanka Sama Samaja Party	Key	4,536	9.40%
Victor Bandara Senaratne	Independent	Eye	479	0.99%
Don Edussoriyage Wiplulasena	Independent	Lamp	66	0.14%
Valid Votes			48,264	100.00%
Rejected Votes			124	
Total Polled			48,388	
Registered Electors			57,858	
Turnout			83.63%	

=== 1983 Parliamentary By Election ===
Candidate	Party	Symbol	Votes	%
Dinesh Gunawardena	Mahajana Eksath Peramuna	Cart Wheel	27,054	55.46%
Gamini Wijesekera	United National Party	Elephant	21,263	43.59%
W. Y. Jayawardene	Independent	Chair	461	0.95%
Valid Votes			48,778	100.00%
Rejected Votes			152	
Total Polled			48,930	
Registered Electors			71,597	
Turnout			68.34%	
