= Kiriella =

Kiriella is a surname. Notable people with the surname include:

- A. E. B. Kiriella (1914–1986), Ceylonese politician
- Amila Kiriella (born 1982), Sri Lankan cricketer
- Lakshman Kiriella (born 1948), Sri Lankan politician and lawyer
