= Yadamini Gunawardena =

Sri Lankan politician

Hon. Yadamini Gunawardena
- යදාමිණී ගුණවර්ධන யாதமினி குணவர்த்தன

Member of the Parliament of Sri Lanka
- In office 20 August 2020 – 24 September 2024
- Constituency: National List

Personal details
- Born: Yadamini Narodhama Rupasinghe Gunawardena
- Party: Mahajana Eksath Peramuna
- Other political affiliations: Sri Lanka People's Freedom Alliance
- Education: University of Wisconsin–Superior; University of Wales

Yadamini Narodhama Rupasinghe Gunawardena is a Sri Lankan politician and Member of Parliament.

Gunawardena is the son of former prime minister Dinesh Gunawardena, and the grandson of Philip Gunawardena, cofounder of the Lanka Sama Samaja Party. His grandmother Kusumasiri Gunawardena was the second elected female Member of Parliament in Sri Lanka. He completed primary and secondary education at Royal College Colombo. He is a graduate of the University of Wisconsin–Superior (2003) and the University of Wales (2013).

Gunawardena is the deputy leader and deputy secretary of the Mahajana Eksath Peramuna. Following the 2020 parliamentary election, he was appointed to the Parliament of Sri Lanka as a National List MP representing the Sri Lanka People's Freedom Alliance.

Gunawardena is married to former UPFA Western province councillor Samanmali Sakalasuriya.
