= Florence Senanayake =

Sri Lankan politician (1903–1988)

Hon. Florence Senanayake

Member of the Ceylon Parliament for Kiriella
- In office 1947–1952
- Preceded by: seat created
- Succeeded by: A. E. B. Kiriella

Personal details
- Born: Daisy Maria Florence Mendis; 19 June 1903
- Died: 3 December 1988 (aged 85)
- Party: Lanka Sama Samaja Party
- Spouse: Reginald S. Vincent Senanayke
- Relations: K. E. Mendis (father)
- Children: Nimal, Laki, Daya, Evan, Rani, Lalitha
- Education: Princess of Wales' College, Colombo
- Occupation: politician

Daisy Maria Florence Senanayake (née de Mel) (19 June 1903 – 3 December 1988) was the first female Member of Parliament in Sri Lanka (formerly Ceylon).

Daisy Maria Florence De Mel was born on 19 June 1903 into a family of eight children in Rawatawatta, Moratuwa. Her father, De Mel was a planter. She was educated at the Princess of Wales' College, Colombo.

In 1925 she married Reginald S. Vincent Senanayke (1898–1946), a planter and founding member of the Lanka Sama Samaja Party and its treasurer between 1935 and 1939.

Senanayake was elected in 1947 at the 1st Ceylonese parliamentary elections, as the member for Kiriella, representing the Lanka Sama Samaja Party. She polled 5,535 votes (35.5% of the total vote) winning against a field of five other male candidates, with her nearest opponent, T. K. W. Chandrasekera, receiving 3,294 votes (21.1% of the total vote). Senanayake failed to retain the seat at the 2nd parliamentary elections in 1952, where she received 3,192 votes (15% of the total votes), with the successful candidate, A. E. B. Kiriella, polling 9,978 votes (48% of the total vote).

She and her husband had six children, including the Laki Senanayake who became an artist.
