= Ramalingam Chandrasekar =

Minister of Fisheries of Sri Lanka since 2024

Hon. Ramalingam Chandrasekar MP
- ராமலிங்கம் சந்திரசேகர் රාමලිංගම් චන්ද්‍රසේකර්

Minister of Fisheries, Aquatic and Ocean Resources
- Incumbent
- Assumed office 18 November 2024
- President: Anura Kumara Dissanayake
- Prime Minister: Harini Amarasuriya
- Preceded by: Anura Kumara Dissanayake

Deputy Chairman of Committees of the Parliament of Sri Lanka
- In office 5 October 2006 – 20 April 2010
- Preceded by: Piyasiri Wijenayake
- Succeeded by: Murugesu Chandrakumar

Member of Parliament for National List
- Incumbent
- Assumed office 21 November 2024
- In office 2001–2010

Personal details
- Born: 22 January 1963 (age 63)
- Party: Janatha Vimukthi Peramuna
- Other political affiliations: National People's Power

Ramalingam Chandrasekar (born 22 January 1963) is a Sri Lankan politician and a member of the Parliament of Sri Lanka who has been serving as the Minister of Fisheries, Aquatic and Ocean Resources since November 2024. A member of National People's Power and Janatha Vimukthi Peramuna, he was appointed a Member of Parliament for the national list in 2024. He previously served as a member of parliament for the national list from 2001 to 2010.
