= Bernard Jayasuriya =

Bernard Jayasuriya was a Ceylonese businessman and politician.

Bernard Jayasuriya was the son of D. C. D. Jayasuriya, a rubber plantation and graphite mine owner. He received his education at S. Thomas College and St. Joseph's College, Colombo, where he captained the school's cricket team. He later played for the Singhalese Sports Club.

He served as a member of the 2nd State Council of Ceylon, between February 1943 and 1947, for Avissawella, following the arrest and detention of the sitting member, Philip Gunawardena in July 1942 for his participation in the independence struggle in India. As a result, Gunawardena's seat in the State Council was made vacant and was won in the following by-election on 27 February 1943 by Jayasuriya, who secured 10,567 votes, 3,913 votes ahead of his nearest rival, S. T. D. Gunawardane. He was subsequently appointed to the executive committee for Labour, Industry and Commerce.

In 1945 he married Clodagh née Jayewardene, who later became the first female to be elected to the Senate of Ceylon.

Jayasuriya contested the seat of Avissawella at the 1st parliamentary election held in late 1947. He was unsuccessful in his attempt to get elected losing to Philip Gunawardena by almost 12,000 votes.
