= Bandarawela Hotel =

Hotel in Bandarawela, Sri Lanka

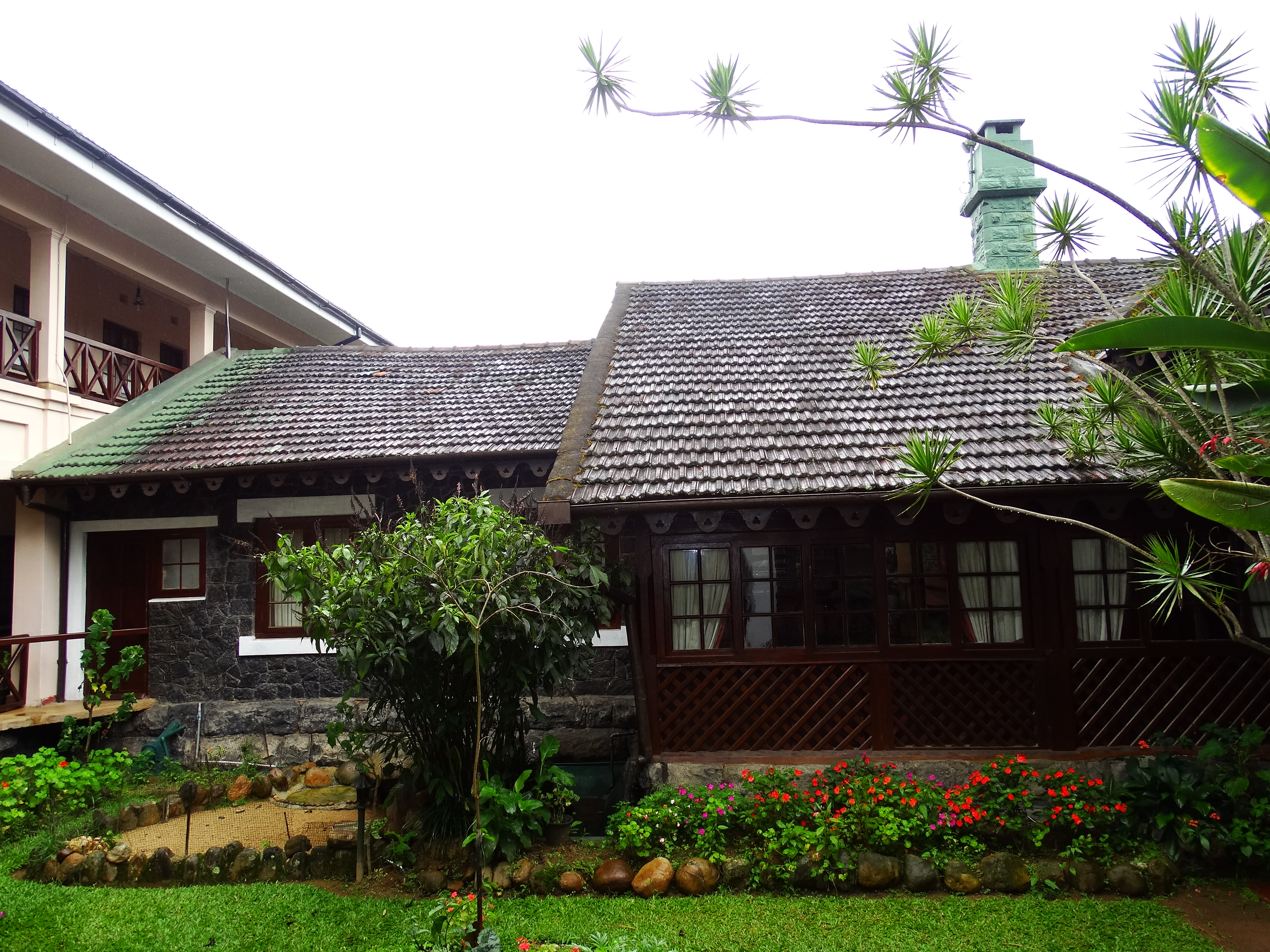
- View from the garden
- Interactive map of the Bandarawela Hotel area
- Former names: The Grand Hotel, Bandarawela

General information
- Location: Bandarawela, Sri Lanka, 14 Welimada Road, Bandarawela
- Coordinates: 6°50′N 80°59′E
- Construction started: 1893
- Opening: 1894
- Owner: Cargills

Technical details
- Floor count: 1

Other information
- Number of rooms: 33 rooms
- Number of suites: 1

Website
- bandarawelahotel.com

The Bandarawela Hotel is a 33-room British colonial two-star hotel located in Bandarawela, Sri Lanka.

The century-old British-built property is associated with the development of the hill-country railway and is situated within walking distance from the railway station. Bandarawela Hotel's origins date back to the turn of the 19th / 20th century when the railways were being extended by the British from Nanu Oya to the southern highlands as a Railway Hotel. The foundation stone for the building was laid in 1893 for a tea planter's club. It was subsequently converted into a rest house and was used as a sanitarium by British soldiers and officers recovering from the Second World War. In 1938 there was a refurbishment and extension of the building to its present capacity. The hotel had a 'European Only' policy until Sri Lankan independence in 1948.

To this day, it remains locked in time somewhere between the 1930s and 1950s and is an alternative to some of the more modern facilities in the area. The hotel shows the influence of British architecture during the period of colonial era in this region. The Bandarawela Hotel is situated over 1,230 m (4,040 ft) above sea level and is Sri Lanka's first mountain resort hotel. The hotel consists of 33 colonial rooms with British furniture. Currently the Bandarawela Hotel is managed by the Cargills group.

== Facilities ==
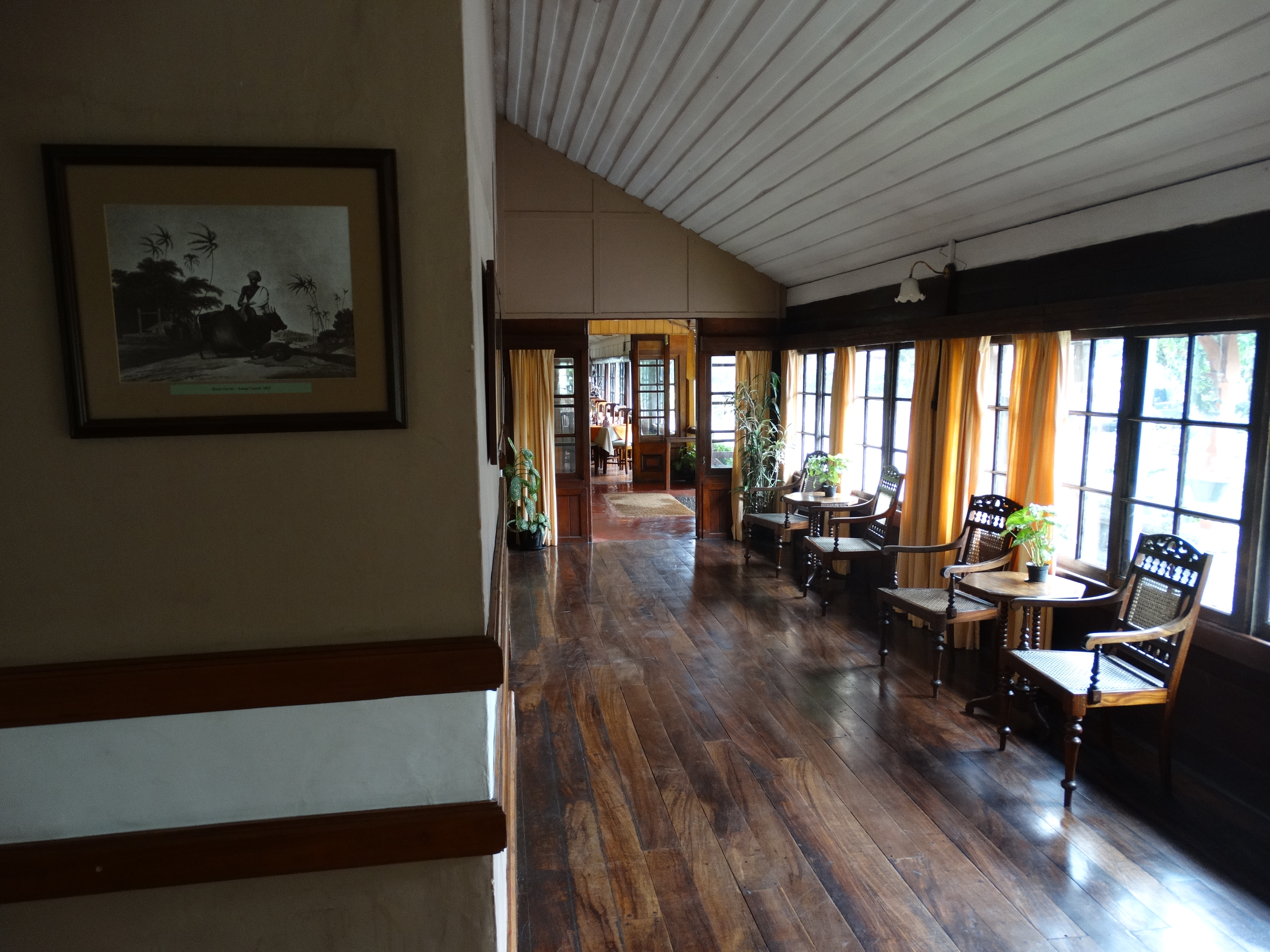
The hotel interior

- Restaurant (70 seats)
- Swimming Pool
- Conference Facilities
- Lounge bar and public bar
- Badminton court
- Tennis court
- Golf course
