= Prasanna Gunawardena =

Prasanna Gunawardena (Sinhala: ප්‍රසන්න ගුණවර්ධන) is a Sri Lankan politician, former mayor of Colombo and a former presidential adviser. He is a Charted Architect and urban planner by profession.

== Personal life ==
Born 23 August 1946 to Philip Gunawardena and Kusuma Amarasinha, Prasanna is brother of Indika (ex-cabinet minister), Lakmali (State Award Winner of literature), Dinesh (cabinet minister and leader of the house – Parliament), and Gitanjana (ex-minister).

== See also ==
- Philip Gunawardena
- Dinesh Gunawardena
- List of political families in Sri Lanka
