= Bandarawela Central College =

Coordinates: 6.506944°N 80.595556°E

- බණ්ඩාරවෙල මධ්‍ය මහා විද්‍යාලයය
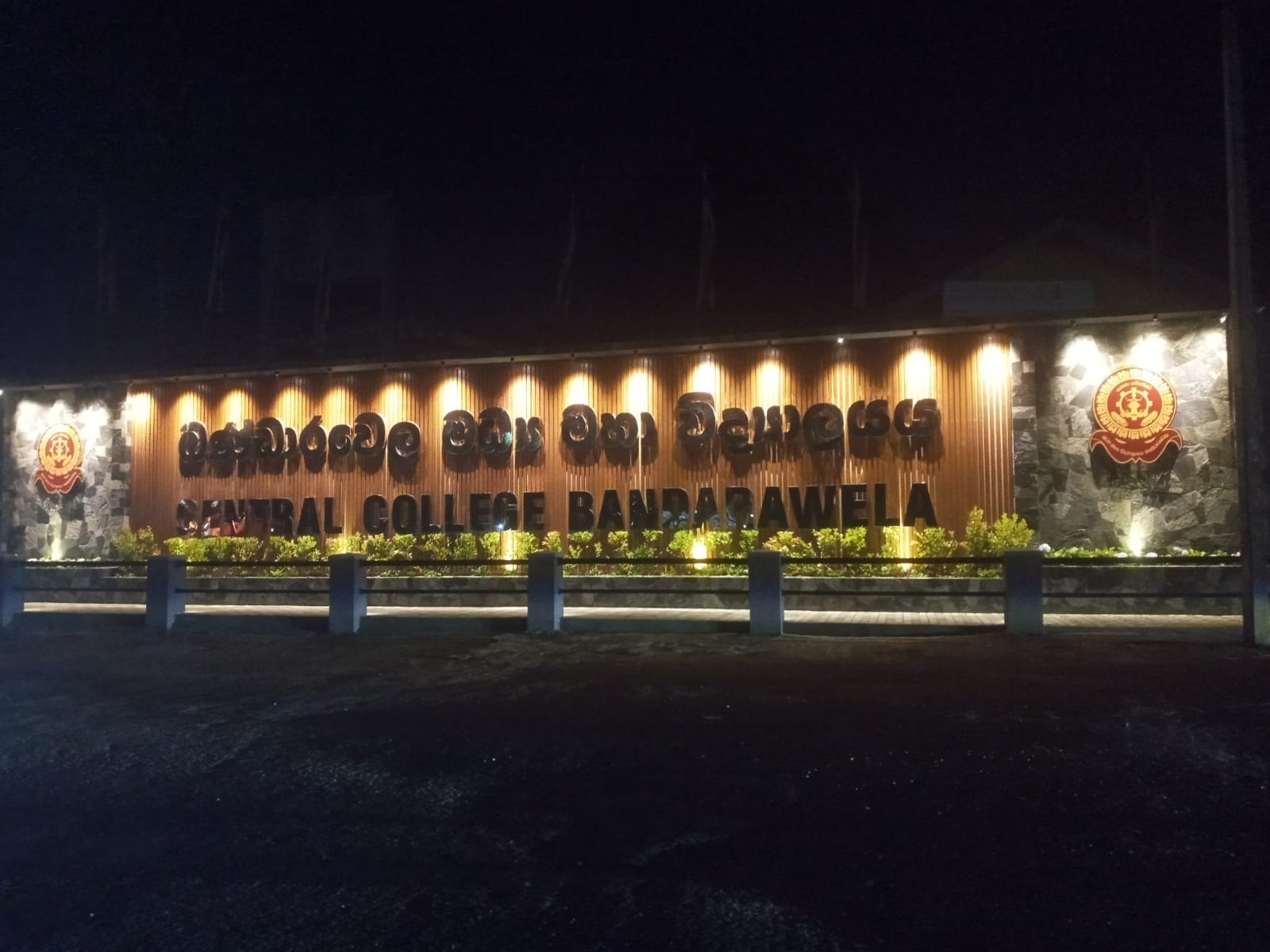
- Bandarawela Central College entrance statement
- Bandarawela; Sri Lanka

Information
- Type: Public
- Motto: Paraththan Patipajjatha (Pali) (Engage in Welfare of Society)
- Religious affiliation: Buddhist
- Established: 1942
- Founder: Amerasekara
- Authority: Ministry of Education
- Principal: Vishaka Rajapaksha
- Staff: 180
- Grades: Class 1 – 13
- Gender: Mix
- Age: 6 to 19
- Enrollment: 5,500
- Colours: Maroon and gold

Bandarawela Central College (BCC), also known as Bandarwela Madya Maha Vidyalaya, is a public school in Bandarawela in Uva province, Sri Lanka which was founded in 1942 as a section of Royal College Colombo. A national school, controlled by the central government (as opposed to the Provincial Council), it provides primary and secondary education. Bandarawela Central College has supplied many undergraduates from Badulla District to local universities.

== History ==
The foundation for the establishment of the college was laid by a Japanese bomb attack on Colombo during World War II. In 1942, Forms 1 to 3 of the Royal College, Colombo were moved to Glendale Bungalow in Bandarawela, where the BCC stands today. In 1944, the Royal Preparatory School was also moved to the same place; in 1948, they were moved back to Colombo.

After the departure of Royal College, a new school was established on its former premises. Beginning with a few buildings, the school grew; Glendale Bungalow was endowed to the school with its 26 acres (11 ha) of land. In 1954, Prime Minister John Kotelawala opened the college main hall and two-storey building required by the rapid development of the college. In 1958, it was renamed Bandarawela Senior School; in 1972, Bandarawela Senior College became the Bandarwela Madya Maha Vidyalaya (Bandarawela Central College). In November 1986 BMMV became a national school, the only such school in Uva Province. In 1974 BMMV's primary school became Bandarawela Darmashoka Vidyalaya; in 1986 Dr. E. W. Adikaram Primary School, Bandarawela was established and it became the Primary of the Bandarawela Central College .

== Status ==
The school educates nearly 5,500 primary and secondary students in Sinhala and English; students may choose their language of instruction. It is administratively divided into two sections: primary (grades 1–5) and secondary (grades 6–13). The school provides housing for boys and girls. Its students have performed well in Ordinary and Advance Level Examinations, rating highly in provincial and island-wide rankings. BCC provides a variety of facilities, including science laboratories, an IT unit, a large playground, a library, auditoriums and sports facilities.

== Houses ==
Students of the school are divided into four houses, named by four renowned Sri Lankan kings in the country's history:

- Gamunu
- Tissa
- Vijaya
- Abaya

== Sports ==
=== Cricket ===
==== Golden Battle of Uva ====
The Golden Battle of Uva is an annual cricket Big Match played against St. Joseph's College, Bandarawela, which was first played in 1996 at the school playground. It later moved to the Bandarawela Urban Council Playground, where it was played until 2003. After a seven-year hiatus from 2004 to 2011, the match was reorganised by the school Old Boys' Association in collaboration with St. Joseph's College and held at the Bandarawela Municipal Council Ground. At the end of the match, Bandarawela Central College won the trophy for the first time in match's history.

== Principals ==
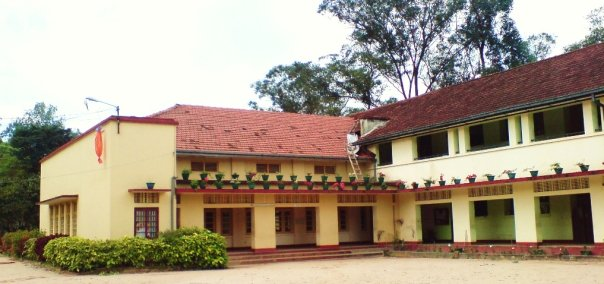
Advanced-level Science Section

| Name | Term |
|---|---|
| Amerasekara | 1949 |
| H. R. Perera | 1950 |
| Percy Bouy | 1954 |
| D. G. R. Abegunawardana | 1960 |
| W. P. K. D. Silva | 1 January 1961 |
| M. B. Rathnayake | – |
| C. Bibile (acting) | 4 June 1965 – 15 February 1966 |
| H. W. Fernando | 15 February 1966 – 1 January 1967 |
| K. V. W. de Silva | 1 January 1967 – 26 May 1977 |
| D. M. P. Dissanayake | 6 June 1977 – 1 March 1979 |
| P. Samaranayake | 1 March 1979 – 31 December 1981 |
| D. M. M. B. Dissanayake (deputy) | 1 January – 1 March 1982 |
| M. P. Alwis | 1 March 1982 – 23 April 1983 |
| W. M. Gunadasa Wijesinghe | 24 April 1983 – 1 August 1993 |
| Wijelatha Gunawardana (acting) | 1 August – 11 October 1993 |
| R. M. Jayasekara | 11 October 1993 – 3 May 1995 |
| A. M. Vithana | 4 May 1995 – 23 November 1997 |
| Wijelatha Gunawardana (acting) | 24 November 1997 – 25 March 1998 |
| Jayantha Wikramanayake | 25 March 1998 – 9 December 2002 |
| H. K. Jayasekara | 9 December 2002 – 12 November 2003 |
| K. M. Aberrathna Banda | 13 November 2003 – 3 April 2009 |
| Sunethra M. Vithana (acting) | 4 April – 1 October 2009 |
| M. M. Vimalasekara | 2 October 2009 – 2013 |
| Kalyani Widyarathne | 2013 – 15 October 2014 |
| D. M. Ranathunga | 16 October 2014- 20 June 2021 |
| G. D. Sarath Bandu Gunasekara | 9 August 2021 – May 2023 |
| T. M. P. U. Sandamali | May 2023 – 2024 |
| Vishaka Rajapaksha | May 2024 – present |

== Notable alumni ==
| Name | Notability | Reference |
|---|---|---|
| W. J. M. Lokubandara | member parliament – Haputale (1977–1989), Badulla (1989–2010), Governor of Sabaragamuwa Province (2010–2015) | |
| Vijitha Herath | member parliament – Gampaha (2010–present) | |
| Samaraweera Weerawanni | member parliament – Badulla (1989–1999), Chief Minister of Uva Province (1999–2001) | |
| Nadeeka Guruge | prominent musician | |

== See also ==
- Royal College, Colombo
