= Indika Gunawardena =

Sri Lankan politician (1943–2015)

Hon. Indika Gunawardena
- ඉන්දික ගුණවර්ධන

Minister of Fisheries and Aquatic Research
- In office 1994–1997
- Preceded by: Joseph Michael Perera
- Succeeded by: Mahinda Rajapaksa

Minister of Higher Education and Information Technology Development
- In office 2000–2001
- Preceded by: Richard Pathirana
- Succeeded by: Sarath Amunugama

Member of Parliament for Colombo
- In office 1994–2001

Personal details
- Born: 8 February 1943
- Died: 14 September 2015 (aged 72)
- Spouse: Dr. Padmini Gunawardana
- Children: Diyath, Yasith
- Education: Royal College, Colombo
- Occupation: Politics

Indika Gunawardena (Sinhala: ඉන්දික ගුණවර්ධන; 8 February 1943 – 14 September 2015) was a Sri Lankan politician.

Indika Gunawardena was born on 8 February 1943, the son of Philip Gunawardena and Kusumasiri née Amarasinghe. His brothers included Prasanna Gunawardena, a former mayor of Colombo, Lakmali Gunawardena, state award winner of literature, Dinesh Gunawardena, Prime Minister of Sri Lanka from 2022 to 2024, and Gitanjana Gunawardena, a former minister. Gunawardena was educated at the Royal College, Colombo.

He was first elected to parliament at the 1994 Sri Lankan parliamentary elections representing the Sri Lanka Freedom Party in the Colombo electorate. He was appointed as the Minister of Fisheries and Aquatic Research in 1994, as part of the Wijetunga cabinet, the Minister of Higher Education and Information Technology Development in October 2000, and the Minister of Posts and Telecommunication in September 2001, as part of the Kumaratunga cabinet.

== See also ==
- List of political families in Sri Lanka

== References & External links ==
- The Gunawardena Ancestry
- Food for thought from the North
- You’re hiding behind sari pota, angry Srimani tells Ashraff
