= Nalaka Gunawardene =

Sri Lankan journalist (born 1966)

- Born: February 13, 1966 (age 60); Colombo, Sri Lanka
- Occupations: Journalist, science writer
- Years active: 1980–present
- Website: Official website

Nalaka Gunawardene is a Sri Lankan science communicator, journalist, media researcher, documentary producer and development-communication specialist whose work has connected science with democracy, human rights, media freedom, technology, disaster preparedness, environmental issues and social justice across Sri Lanka and Asia.

He initially worked as a science journalist in Sri Lanka's English language newspapers, and also freelanced for radio and television. After winning three national awards for outstanding science journalism, he moved on to the development sector, where he worked as an editorial consultant, journalist trainer and communication advisor.

His twenty one year collaboration with reputed science fictional writer Arthur C. Clarke, his regional disaster communication work, media reform research, advocacy for information access and press freedom, and his public defense or marginalized communities including LGBTIQ people form a broad body of work.

In 1996, he co-founded TVE Asia Pacific, a Colombo-based regional not-for-profit media foundation communicating sustainable development issues through TV, video and the web. As its director since 2002, he has scripted, directed, produced or executive produced several dozen Asian and global documentaries, including Children of Tsunami: No More Tears (2005). In 2006, he called for media content on poverty and development to be recognised as a 'copyright free zone' to enhance their secondary use for public education purposes.

He is the author/editor of several technical books related to science, technology and development, most recently Communicating Disasters: An Asia Pacific Resource Book (TVEAP/UNDP, 2007). He was part of the British and South Asian team of researchers associated with the Media South Asia Project that studied the nature of the satellite television revolution which began in the early 1990s and transformed South Asian societies and cultures.

He is especially known for his analytical writing on the impact of Information and communication technologies for development (ICTs) on developing Asian societies. From 2003 to 2008, he was Contributing Editor (Sri Lanka) of the bi-annual regional survey Digital Review of Asia Pacific, and co-authored National Human Development Report – Promoting ICT for Human Development in Sri Lanka Report (UNDP, 2004).

He also worked as a Sri Lankan adviser to International Media Support between 2017 and 2020, contributing to media-development activities, journalist training, audience research and discussions of media policy.

His writing has also addressed threats to journalists and the wider question of media freedom in Sri Lanka. He has written about journalists who were killed or attacked during periods of political and ethnic conflict, including the assassination of newspaper editor and journalist Lasantha Wickrematunge. In this work, Gunawardene has examined issues including impunity, intimidation of journalists, attacks on media organizations and the conditions required for independent journalism.

He is a regular speaker or panelist at international conferences on public communication of science and technology, development journalism, public interest broadcasting and ICT for development. He has been on juries at leading international documentary film festivals. Most recently, he was a juror for the International Digital Emmy Awards 2011, presented in Cannes, France on 4 April 2011.

Nalaka Gunawardene started writing a Sinhala language columns for the alternative newspaper Ravaya, a Sinhala language Sunday newspaper from February, 2011. Some selected stories were published as a book in August, 2012. A second book with 54 columns written in 2012-13 is being prepared for printing. The second book will be released in September, 2013.

He is on the board of directors of Panos South Asia, and a Trustee of the Science and Development Network in the UK.

He has worked on many projects funded by US Embassy in Colombo, including Leaders in Environmental Advocacy Forum (LEAF).
