= A. E. B. Kiriella =

Ceylonese politician

Hon. A. E. B. Kiriella

Member of the Ceylon Parliament for Kiriella
- In office 1952–1956
- Preceded by: Florence Senanayake
- Succeeded by: Kusumasiri Gunawardena
- In office 1960–1960
- Preceded by: Kusumasiri Gunawardena
- Succeeded by: P. B. Wijesundara

Personal details
- Born: Arthur Emmanuel Bandara Kiriella; 1914 Mahahena
- Died: 25 February 1986
- Party: United National Party
- Occupation: politician, homeopathic physician

Arthur Emmanuel Bandara Kiriella (1914 – 25 February 1986) was a Ceylonese politician.

Kiriella ran as one of the two United National Party candidates at the 1st parliamentary election, held between 23 August 1947 and 20 September 1947, for the Kiriella electorate. He was unsuccessful, finishing behind the Lanka Sama Samaja Party candidate, Florence Senanayake, who secured 35.5% of the total vote, and the other United National Party candidate, T. K. W. Chandrasekera, who secured 21% of the total vote, with Kiriella only receiving 16% of the total vote.

At the 2nd parliamentary election, held between 24 May 1952 and 30 May 1952, Kiriella ran as the sole United National Party candidate and won the seat, with 9,978 votes (48% of the total vote) defeating both the sitting member and the Sri Lanka Freedom Party candidate, Jayaweera Kuruppu. Kiriella was unable however to retain the seat at the 3rd parliamentary election, held between 5 April 1956 and 10 April 1956, losing to the Sri Lanka Freedom Party candidate, Kusumasiri Gunawardena, who obtained 16,272 votes (68% of the total vote) to Kiriella's 6,309 votes (26.5% of the total vote).

Kiriella re-contested the seat again at the 4th parliamentary election, held on 19 March 1960, where he won by 1,546 votes over the Lanka Sama Samaja Party candidate, P. B. Wijesundara, securing 33% of the total vote. However, as neither of the major political parties managed to obtain a sufficient majority in the election a new election was called. At the subsequent July 1960 election he was defeated by P. B. Wijesundara, who received 10,708 votes (54% of the total vote) as opposed to Kiriella's 8,230 votes (41% of the total vote).

Kiriella ran again as the United National Party candidate at the 6th parliamentary election, held on 22 March 1965, but was unsuccessful with the sitting member, Wijesundara, retaining his seat. He resigned from the United National Party and ran as an independent at the 7th parliamentary election, held on 27 May 1970, finishing a distant third, polling only 300 votes.

He was one of the first homeopathic practitioners registered under the 1970 Homeopathy Act. Kiriella died on 25 February 1986.
