= Sarath Gunawardena =

Sri Lankan politician

Ganegama Liyanage Sarath Gunawardena (May 27, 1949 – May 4, 2003) was a Member of Parliament in Sri Lanka, was born in Galle. He represented the Galle District and was the Ratgama Chief United National Party organizer, and he functioned as a Cabinet consultant to the Sri Lankan government on health and nutrition in 2003. Gunawardena was also the Managing Director of Hotel Francis, Hikkaduwa.

G. L. Sarath Gunawardena (Ganegama Liyanage Sarath Gunawardena) of the United National Party (UNP) was elected to the 10th Parliament of Sri Lanka at the 1994 Sri Lankan parliamentary election held on 16 August 1994, representing the Galle Electoral District with 56,568 preferential votes.

He was subsequently re-elected to the 11th Parliament of Sri Lanka at the 2000 Sri Lankan parliamentary election held on 10 October 2000, securing 46,656 preferential votes from the same district

Sarath Gunawardena died on Saturday May 4, 2003 at the Karapitiya General Hospital at the age of 53.
