= Gitanjana Gunawardena =

Sri Lankan politician

Personal details
- Born: 24 February 1952 (age 74)
- Profession: Engineer

Gitanjana Gunawardena (born 24 February 1952) is a Sri Lankan politician, former member of Parliament of Sri Lanka and former minister. He is a Chartered Engineer by profession.

== Personal life ==
Born 24 February 1952 to Philip Gunawardena and Kusuma Amarasinha, he is the brother of Indika (Ex-Cabinet Minister), Prasanna (Ex-Mayor of Colombo), Lakmali (State Award Winner of literature), and Dinesh (Prime Minister of Sri Lanka from 2022 to 2024).

== See also ==
- List of political families in Sri Lanka
