= Kusal Goonewardena =

Australian physical therapist

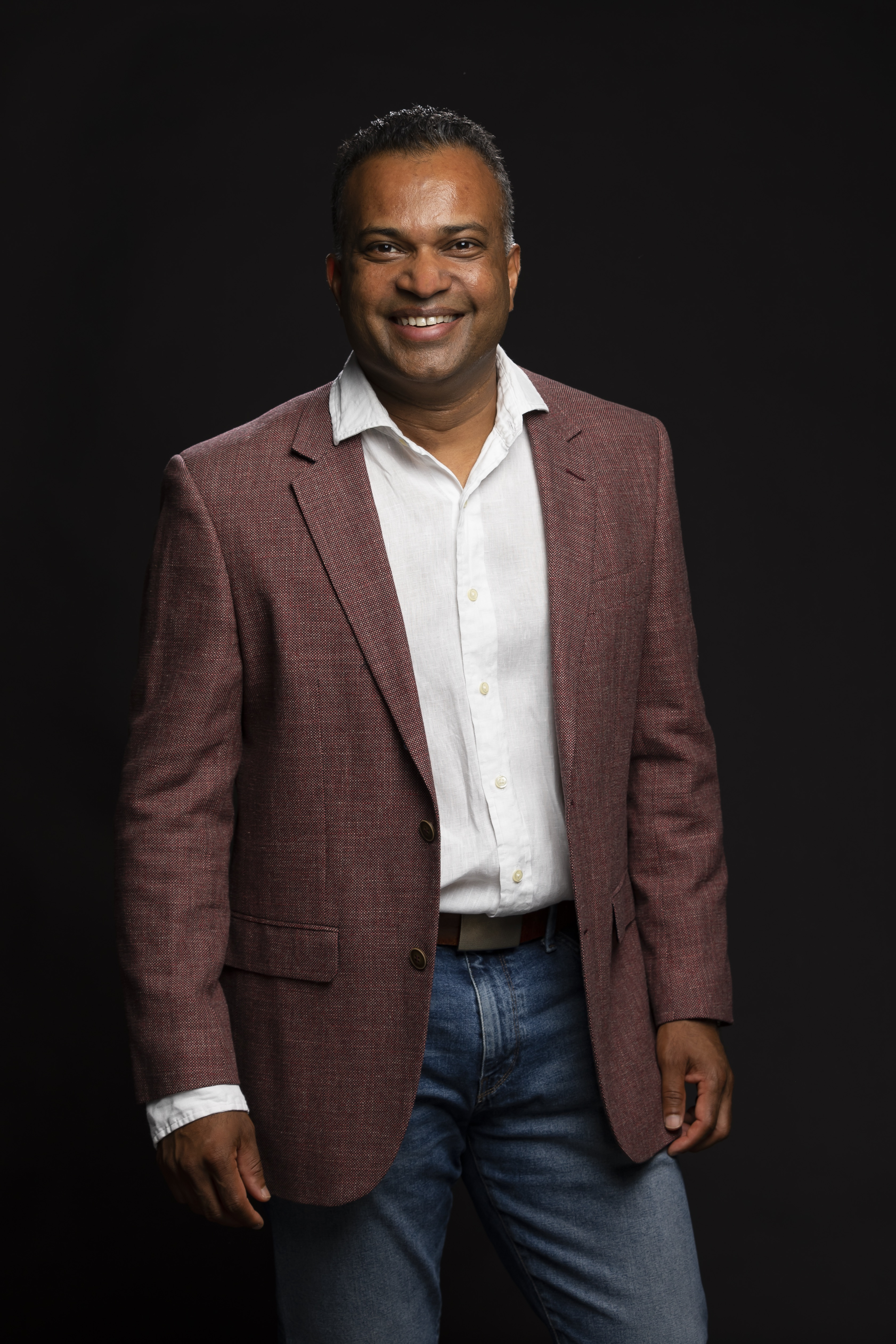
- Goonewardena in 2021
- Education: Nalanda College, Colombo, BA in Physiotherapy, University of Melbourne Master of Physiotherapy, La Trobe University
- Occupations: Physical therapist, lecturer, author
- Title: Founder and Head of Sports Medicine at Elite Akademy, University of Melbourne
- Board member of: Entrepreneurs' Organization (formerly)

Kusal Goonewardena is an Australian physical therapist and health lecturer known for being founder and Head of Sports Medicine at Elite Akademy, University of Melbourne. He has authored several books and is a fitness expert on ABC Radio National's Life Matters program.

== Early life and education ==
Kusal Goonewardena was born in Sri Lanka. He had his primary education at Nalanda College, Colombo. His family travelled often during his childhood, as his father was an engineer who worked for the United Nations. They lived in Zambia, England, Oman and Bangladesh before settling down in Australia when Kusal was nine.

Kusal Goonewardena earned a bachelor's degree in physiotherapy from the University of Melbourne in 1999. He earned his Master of Physiotherapy from La Trobe University in 2007. He specializes in sports physiotherapy and high-intensity interval training (HIIT).

== Career ==
=== Physical therapy ===
In 1999, Goonewardena founded Vigor Sport Medicine, a chain of fitness clinics in Melbourne which double as teaching clinics for La Trobe University and Melbourne University. He also runs clinics in Bacchus Marsh and Melton, Victoria.

He became a team physiotherapist for University of Melbourne in 2002, and has been Head of Sports Medicine for the UniSport Nationals' University of Melbourne team since 2008. In an interview with The Age, Goonewardena stated that he wanted "to give something back to the University that gave me a great grounding in my career".

He was the head of the medical team for University of Melbourne during the 2009 Australian University Games, and is the official provider for the university's Elite Athlete Program. In this capacity he is known for working with Australian athletes such as Katya Crema, Lachlan Norris, Phoebe Stanley, Jeff Tho and Freddy Ovett. He is also the physical therapist of German tennis player Laura Siegemund.

Goonewardena is the head physiotherapist of Elite Akademy, a training clinic based at University of Melbourne, which he founded in May 2012. The training clinic is part of the Nona Lee Sports Centre and works with Olympic, Winter Olympic and national athletes from Melbourne University Sport. He led the medical team for German tennis player Laura Siegemund at the 2020 Australian Open. He then worked with Russian player Vera Zvonareva at the 2022 Australian Open. Svonareva had been Siegemund's tennis doubles partner at the 2020 Australian Open.

He has authored several books including 3 Minute Workouts (2015), Natural Healing: Quiet & Calm (2016) and Back Pain – 30 Days to Pain Free (2014). Goonewardena created the Kinrgize app with Elite Akademy in 2018, which allows users to track their fitness levels, workout regimens and sleeping habits.

=== Health expert and lecturer ===
Kusal Goonewardena has been the fitness expert on ABC Radio National's Life Matters radio program since 2017. He has been featured as a health expert on The Informer with George Donikian.

Goonewardena has also been a guest expert in publications such as Body+Soul and The Sydney Morning Herald.

Goonewardena was a board member of the Entrepreneurs' Organization, an international nonprofit. In 2014, Goonewardena became a mentor at The Founder Institute in Melbourne. That same year he co-presented "The Three Entrepreneurs", part of Swinburne University of Technology's Learning from Entrepreneurs series.

In 2015, Goonewardena was a plenary speaker at the 8th International Research Conference at KDU College in Malaysia.

== Publications ==
=== Books ===
- Back Pain – 30 Days to Pain Free. Wilkinson Publishing. 2014. ISBN 1922178780, 9781922178787
- 3 Minute Workouts. Wilkinson Publishing. 2015. ISBN 1925265137, 9781925265132
- Natural Healing: Quiet & Calm. co-authored by Helene Finizio. Wilkinson Publishing. 2016. ISBN 1925265587, 9781925265583

=== Articles ===
- Robinson, Mark; Tan, Ying; Goonewardena, Kusal; Oetomo, Denny; Manzie, Chris (November 2021). "Evaluation of ceiling-supported back harnesses in preventing injury in sheep shearing". 2021 43rd Annual International Conference of the IEEE Engineering in Medicine & Biology Society (EMBC). Vol. 2021. pp. 6957–6961. doi:10.1109/EMBC46164.2021.9629719. ISBN 978-1-7281-1179-7. PMID 34892704. S2CID 244573084. with Robinson, Mark; Tan, Ying; Oetomo, Denny; and Manzie, Chris.
- Guo, Xinliang; Lu, Lei; Robinson, Mark; Tan, Ying; Goonewardena, Kusal; Oetomo, Denny (18 June 2021). "A Weak Monotonicity Based Muscle Fatigue Detection Algorithm for a Short-Duration Poor Posture Using sEMG Measurements". 2021 43rd Annual International Conference of the IEEE Engineering in Medicine & Biology Society (EMBC). Vol. 2021. pp. 2238–2241. arXiv:2106.10109. doi:10.1109/EMBC46164.2021.9631010. ISBN 978-1-7281-1179-7. PMID 34891732. S2CID 235485201. with Guo, Xinliang; Lu, Lei; Robinson, Mark; Tan, Ying; and Oetomo, Denny.
- Lu, Lei; Robinson, Mark; Tan, Ying; Goonewardena, Kusal; Guo, Xinliang; Mareels, Iven; Oetomo, Denny (2020). "Effective Assessments of a Short- Duration Poor Posture on Upper Limb Muscle Fatigue Before Physical Exercise". Frontiers in Physiology. 11 541974. doi:10.3389/fphys.2020.541974. hdl:11343/252651. PMC 7579401. PMID 33132916. with Robinson, Mark; Lu, Lei; Tan, Ying; Guo, Xinliang; Mareels, Iven; and Oetomo, Denny.
- Robinson, Mark; Lu, Lei; Tan, Ying; Goonewardena, Kusal; Oetomo, Denny; Manzie, Chris (July 2020). "Enabling context aware data analysis for long-duration repetitive stooped work through human activity recognition in sheep shearing". 2020 42nd Annual International Conference of the IEEE Engineering in Medicine & Biology Society (EMBC). Vol. 2020. pp. 87–90. doi:10.1109/EMBC44109.2020.9175839. ISBN 978-1-7281-1990-8. PMID 33017937. S2CID 221385054. with Robinson, Mark; Lu, Lei; Tan, Ying; Oetomo, Denny; and Manzie, Chris.
- "Association Between Lipids, Statin & Cognition: Is timing the key?". Alzheimer's & Dementia. 15. Alzheimer's Association. July 2019. doi:10.1016/j.jalz.2019.06.3330. S2CID 204761022. with Jian Chin, Tze; Szoeke, Cassandra; and Gorelik, Alexandra.
