= H.C. Goonewardene =

H. C. Goonewardene, CCS was a Sri Lankan civil servant. He was the former Permanent Secretary of Ministry of Home Affairs.

He was educated at Royal College, Colombo and University College, Colombo and entered the Ceylon Civil Service. Thereafter he served as Land Commissioner and Government Agent of several areas including Batticaloa.

His brother C. T. Goonewardene was the Surveyor General.
