= Bandarawela =

Bandarawela බණ්ඩාරවෙල பண்டாரவளை
- City
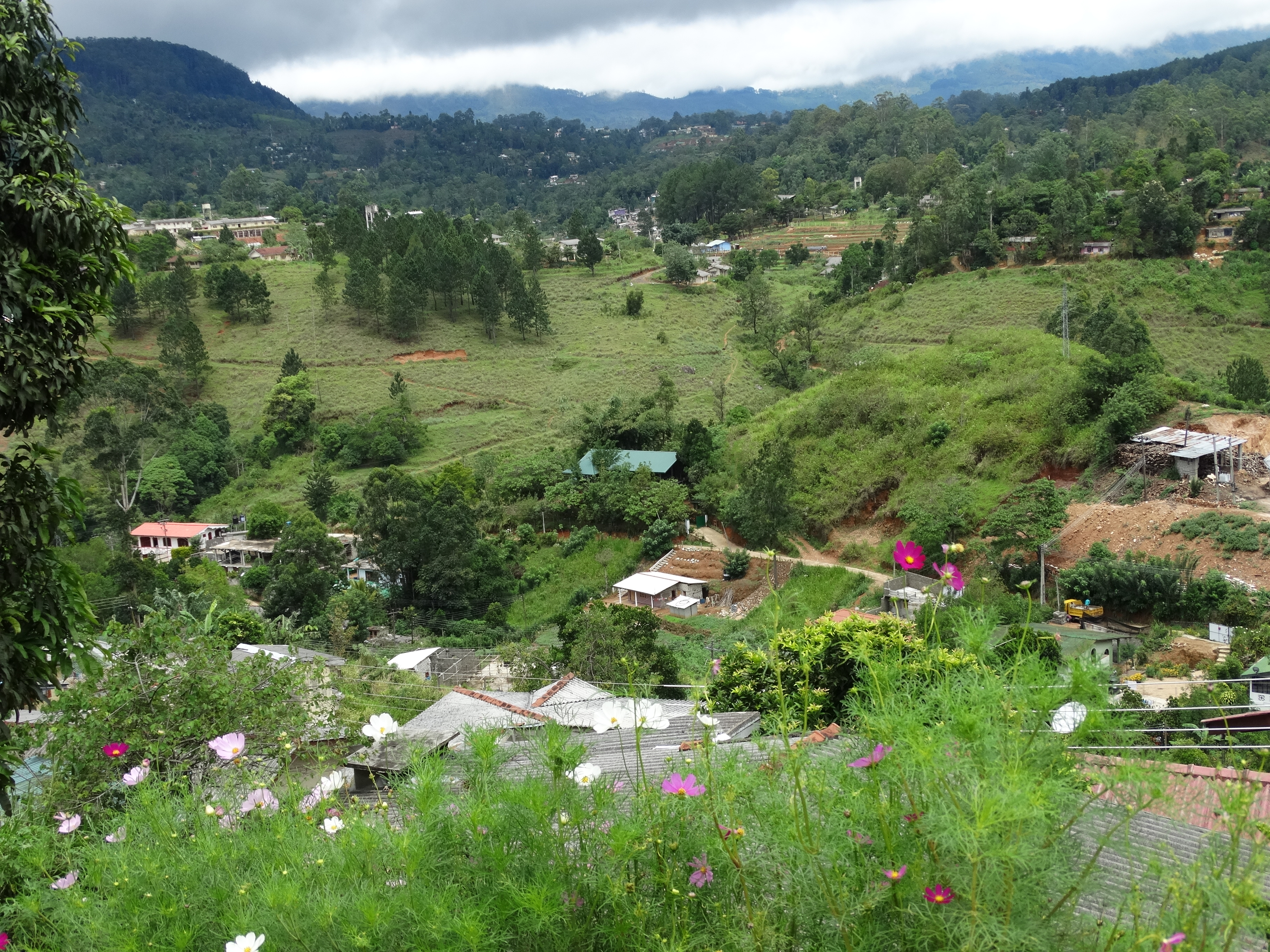
- Countryside scenery around Bandarawela

- Location within Sri Lanka
- Coordinates: 6°50′0″N 80°59′0″E
- Country: Sri Lanka
- Province: Uva Province
- District: Badulla District
- Elevation: 1,226 m (4,022 ft)
- Highest elevation (Nayabedda Peak): 1,943 m (6,375 ft)
- Lowest elevation: 950 m (3,120 ft)

Population
  - Total: 32,000 (2,021)(Municipal council area); 71,308(DS division); 110,683(polling division)
  - Density: 968/km^{2} (2,510/sq mi)
- Time zone: UTC+5:30 (Sri Lanka Standard Time Zone)
- Postal code: 90100

Bandarawela (Sinhala: බණ්ඩාරවෙල, pronounced [banˈda:rawela]; Tamil: பண்டாரவளை) is the second largest town in the Badulla District which is 28 km (17 mi) away from Badulla. Bandarawela is 200 km (120 mi) away from Colombo and about 125 km (78 mi) away from Kandy, the two largest cities of Sri Lanka. Thanks to its higher altitude, compared to surrounding locations, Bandarawela has milder weather conditions throughout the year making it a tourist destination for locals. Bandarawela is within hours reach of surrounding towns and cities by both road and rail. The town is influenced by its colonial history and rests among dense, lush forestation occupying a niche among visitors as a base for tourism.

== Politics ==
The town is governed by a municipal council and headed by a mayor. The council is elected by popular vote and has nine members. There were 16,673 registered voters in the 2011 local authorities elections.

The area outside the municipality is governed by the "Pradeshiya Saba" which is similar to the urban council. The Pradeshiya Saba is elected by popular vote and has 10 members. In the 2006 local authorities election there were 37,972 registered voters.

== History and heritage ==
Evidence of Human settlement has been found in Bandarawela dating back to 7500 years ago.Geometric microliths made out of quartz and chert have been found at the Church-hill prehistoric site, near the Church of the ascension Bandarawela.

The ancient Dhowa Rock Temple was founded by King Walagamba in the first century B.C.E. (1 B.C.E.) and is located beside Badulla-Bandarawela highway, 6 km (3.7 mi) from Bandarawela. The temple contains a 12 m (39 ft)-high Buddha image sculpted from rock and paintings depicting Jataka stories belonging to the Kandyan era.The ancient Dhowa Buddhist rock temple is one of the well-known heritage sites in this region. Other historic areas of interest include the Roman Catholic St. Anthony's Church and a local Methodist church.

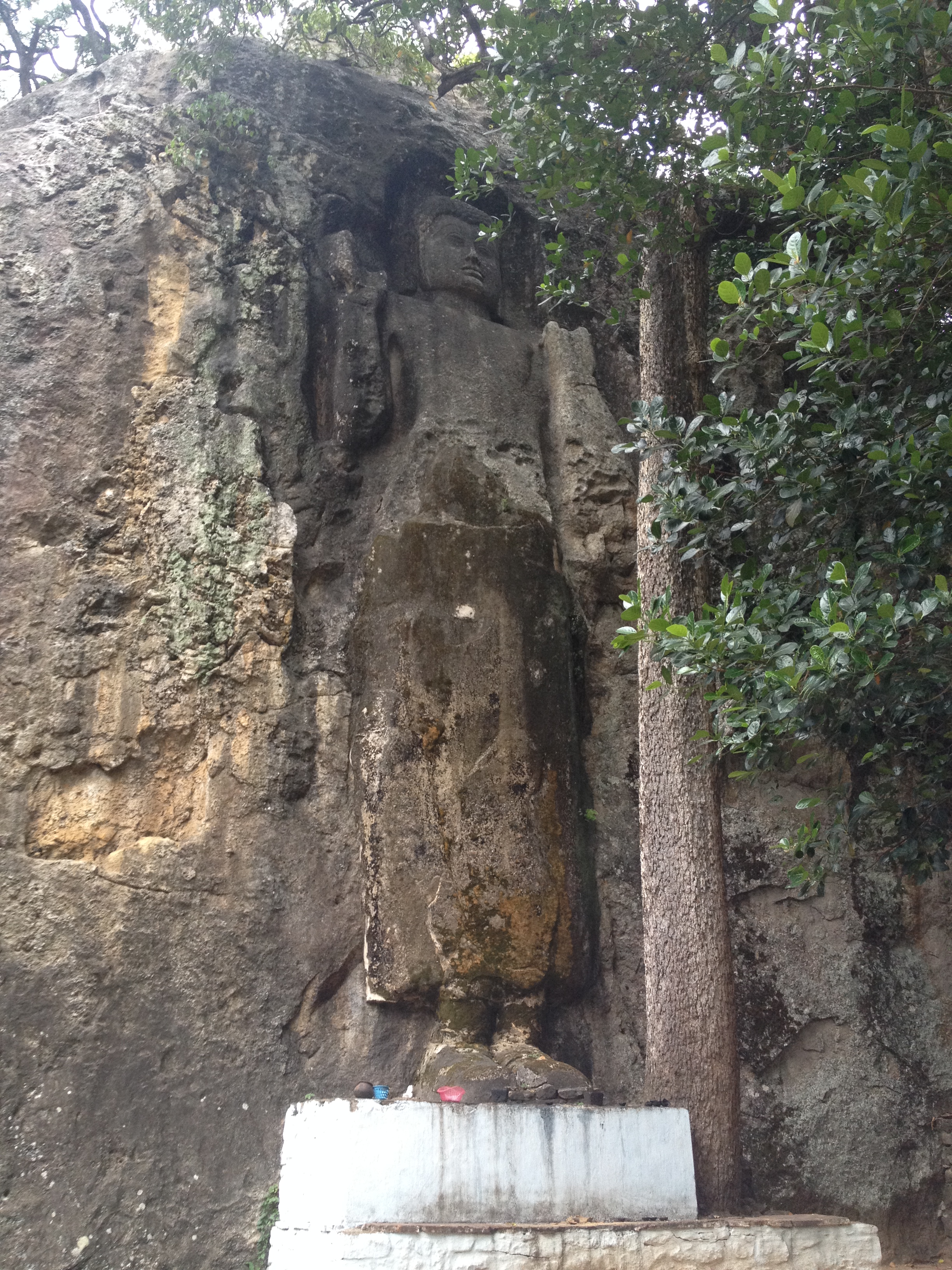
Ancient buddha statue at Dhowa temple

== Geography and climate ==
Bandarawela is located at a high altitude and surrounded by a large number of mountains in Uva and the Central Province. The highest Mountain in the local area is Nayabedda peak, which lies 6,375 ft (1,943 m)above mean sea.

According to the local climatic zone classifications, Bandarawela is classified under Up Country Intermediate Zone (UCIZ) which is spread over the Badulla and Monaragala Districts. The average elevation above sea level at Bandarawela is 4,242 ft (1,293 m). The elevation of Bandarawela ranges between 3,110 ft (950 m) and 6,375 ft (1,943 m), the annual average rainfall is 1,652 mm (65.0 in) and the monthly average temperature is between 18.9 °C (66.0 °F) (in January) and 22.4 °C (72.3 °F) (in May). The average annual temperature in Bandarawela is 21.0 °C (69.8 °F). The Bandarawela area consists mainly of red yellow Podzolic soil, which is strongly acidic and favourable for tea plantations. The Köppen-Geiger climate classification system classifies its climate as Tropical rainforest (Af) bordering with a subtropical highland (Cfb) climate at Haputale.

Climate data for Bandarawela, elevation 1,226 m (4,022 ft), (1991–2020)
Month	Jan	Feb	Mar	Apr	May	Jun	Jul	Aug	Sep	Oct	Nov	Dec	Year
Record high °C (°F)	26.4 (79.5)	28.7 (83.7)	30.8 (87.4)	30.4 (86.7)	31.3 (88.3)	31.1 (88.0)	30.2 (86.4)	30.7 (87.3)	31.7 (89.1)	30.8 (87.4)	27.9 (82.2)	27.4 (81.3)	31.7 (89.1)
Mean daily maximum °C (°F)	22.9 (73.2)	24.4 (75.9)	26.1 (79.0)	26.3 (79.3)	27.0 (80.6)	26.5 (79.7)	26.4 (79.5)	26.4 (79.5)	26.1 (79.0)	25.0 (77.0)	23.7 (74.7)	22.7 (72.9)	25.3 (77.5)
Daily mean °C (°F)	18.9 (66.0)	19.7 (67.5)	20.7 (69.3)	21.6 (70.9)	22.4 (72.3)	22.3 (72.1)	22.2 (72.0)	22.1 (71.8)	21.7 (71.1)	21.1 (70.0)	20.1 (68.2)	19.2 (66.6)	21.0 (69.8)
Mean daily minimum °C (°F)	14.9 (58.8)	14.9 (58.8)	15.4 (59.7)	16.9 (62.4)	17.9 (64.2)	18.1 (64.6)	18.0 (64.4)	17.7 (63.9)	17.3 (63.1)	16.8 (62.2)	16.4 (61.5)	15.8 (60.4)	16.7 (62.1)
Record low °C (°F)	8.6 (47.5)	8.6 (47.5)	10.9 (51.6)	13.5 (56.3)	15.3 (59.5)	10.7 (51.3)	13.7 (56.7)	14.7 (58.5)	14.4 (57.9)	13.9 (57.0)	10.5 (50.9)	8.7 (47.7)	8.6 (47.5)
Average precipitation mm (inches)	153.0 (6.02)	96.4 (3.80)	137.6 (5.42)	236.4 (9.31)	171.2 (6.74)	90.5 (3.56)	71.2 (2.80)	67.8 (2.67)	165.4 (6.51)	347.1 (13.67)	338.1 (13.31)	231.3 (9.11)	2,106 (82.91)
Average precipitation days (≥ 1.0 mm)	14.5	10.3	11.2	18.5	14.6	7.4	6.9	8.1	12.9	22.3	24.2	19.5	170.7
Source: NOAA

== Demography ==
Bandarawela is a Sinhala-majority town. There are sizable communities belonging to other ethnic groups such as Indian Tamils, Sri Lanka Moors and Sri Lanka Tamils.The peripheral areas are generally Sinhala majority neighbourhoods, estate regions (such as Liyangahawela and Nayabedda), have an Indian Tamil majority. The urban areas of Bandarawela East and West are ethnically diverse, with small Malay and Burgher communities.

Ethnicity	Population	% of total
Sinhalese	17368	72.6
Sri Lankan Tamils	3145	13.1
Sri Lankan Moors	2,488	10.4
Indian Tamils	923	3.9
Total	23,924	100

=== Religion ===
The main religions in Bandarawela are Buddhism, Hinduism, Islam and Catholicism.

Religions
Buddhism	26932	(76.11%)
Hinduism	3583	(10.13%)
Islam	3288	(9.29%)
Roman Catholic	942	(2.66%)
Other Christian	640	(1.81%)

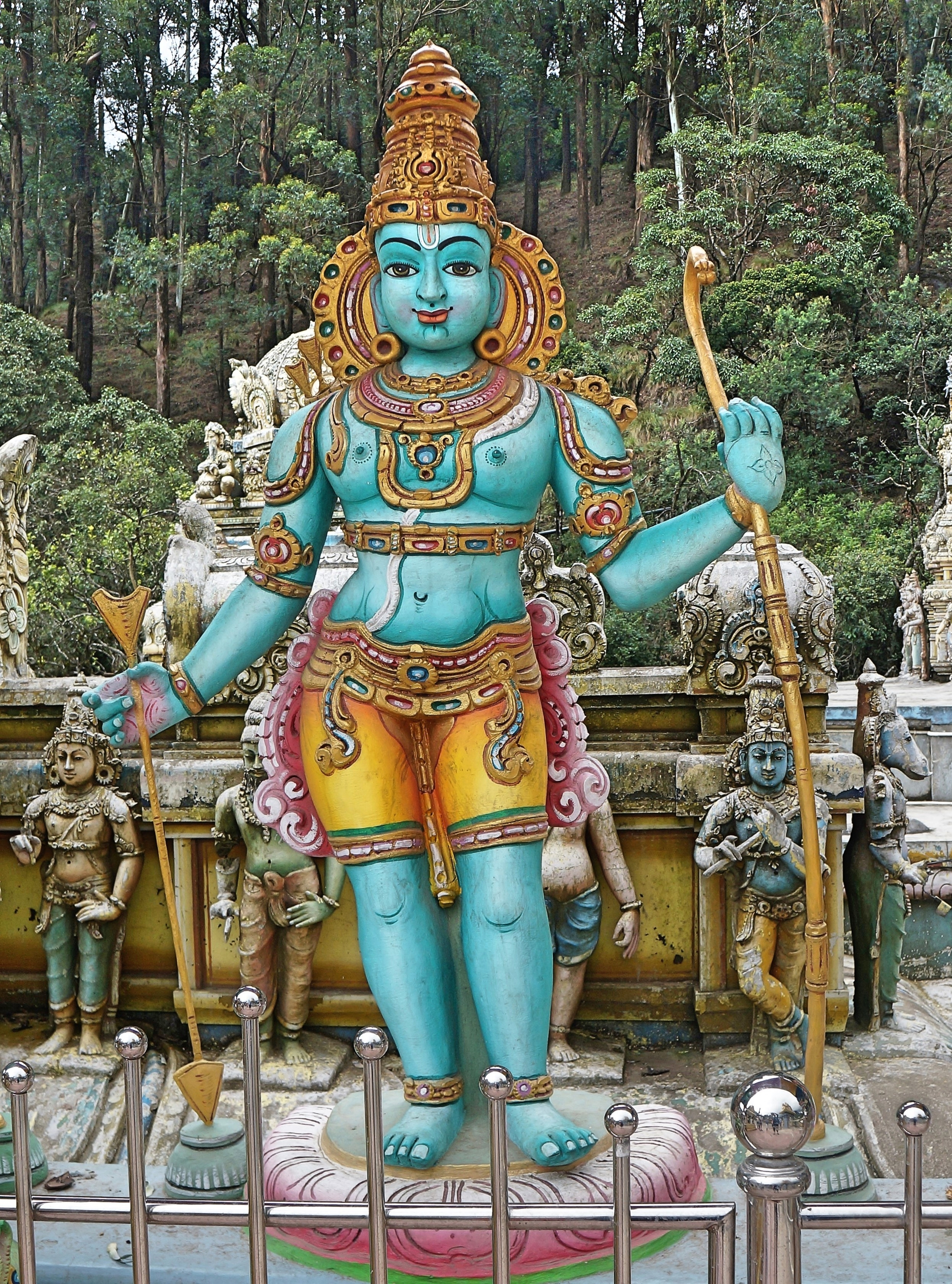
Rāma in Hindu Temple Bandarawela Murugan Kovil

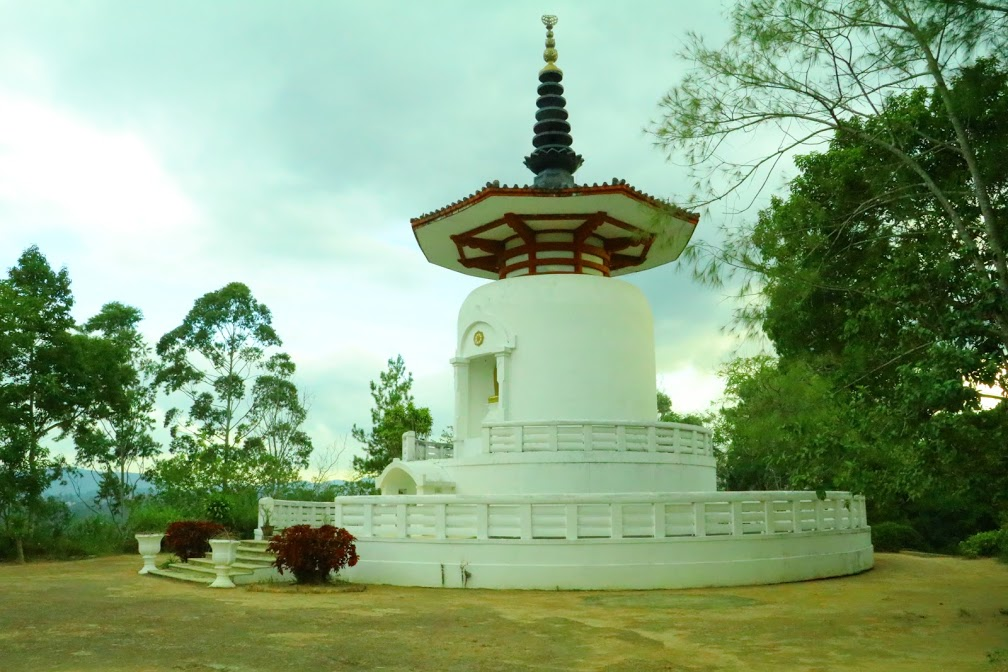
Bandarawela Peace Pagoda, a Buddhist Temple

Religion in Bandarawela
1. Buddhism (76.1%)
2. Hinduism (10.1%)
3. Islam (9.29%)
4. Christianity(incl.Roman Catholics) (4.47%)

== Economy ==
Locals depend primarily upon agriculture and livestock farming to make a living. Many people are directly involved in vegetable cultivation and some work as laborers in tea estates, mainly Indian Tamils. There are a large number of tea plantations managed by both private and government run businesses that produce good quality tea for the world market.Apiculture is a niche economical activity in Bandarawela, with the Bee Development unit of the Sri Lankan department of agriculture being located here. Many types of vegetables are grown in this area throughout the year, such as leek, carrot, beet root, cauliflower and cabbage. Commercial flower cultivation and spice cultivation also contributes to the economy. The Wholesale Vegetale Market in Bandarawela is one of the largest and most important in Sri Lanka.

The mean monthly income in Badulla district was 66,413LKR in 2019, slightly lower than the national average. Despite this, in 2013 Bandarawela had a very low poverty rate compared to neighbouring areas, and was more comparable to Gampaha district in the Western province.

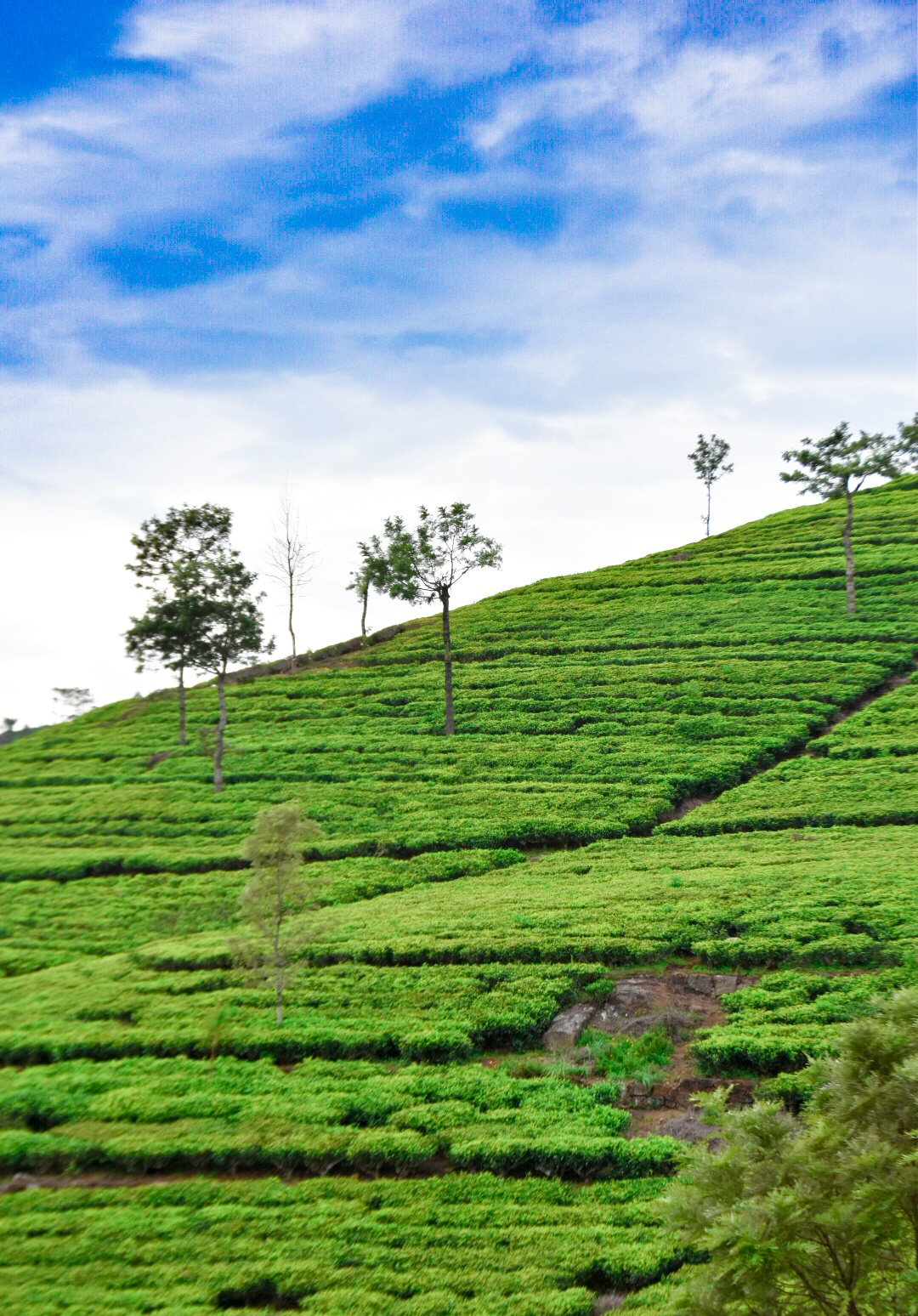
Tea Estate in Bandarawela

Industry does not play a major role in the economy of Bandarawela. Garment factories are the only notable industrial plants.

Tourism is a major source of income in Bandarawela, which boasts many holiday resorts, cottages and hotels. Bandarawela is directly influenced by the popular tourist destinations Ella and Haputale, which are both located 11 km away from Banadarawela in opposite directions. The majority of people in Bandarawela are employed in the service sector, with many people working the government, hospitality and trade sectors. Bandarawela Commercial Centre is a Government owned outlet mall that houses the farmers market of Bandarawela.

== Education ==
During World War II, many schools in Colombo were temporarily moved to Bandarawela such as Royal College, St. Thomas' College and Visakha Vidyalaya. These schools relocated to Bandarawela due to the fear caused by the Japanese bombs. Some schools in the area include Bandarawela Central college, Dharmapala Vidyalaya, Visakha Vidyalaya, Tamil Central College, Little Flower Convent and St. Joseph's College. These schools are governed by the central government of Sri Lanka. S. Thomas' College, Bandarawela is the leading private school and the only boys' school in Bandarawela.

== Tourism ==
Bandarawela is located adjacent to many tourist sites, which has made a base for tourists, both local and foreign. a few tourist destinations. are listed below.

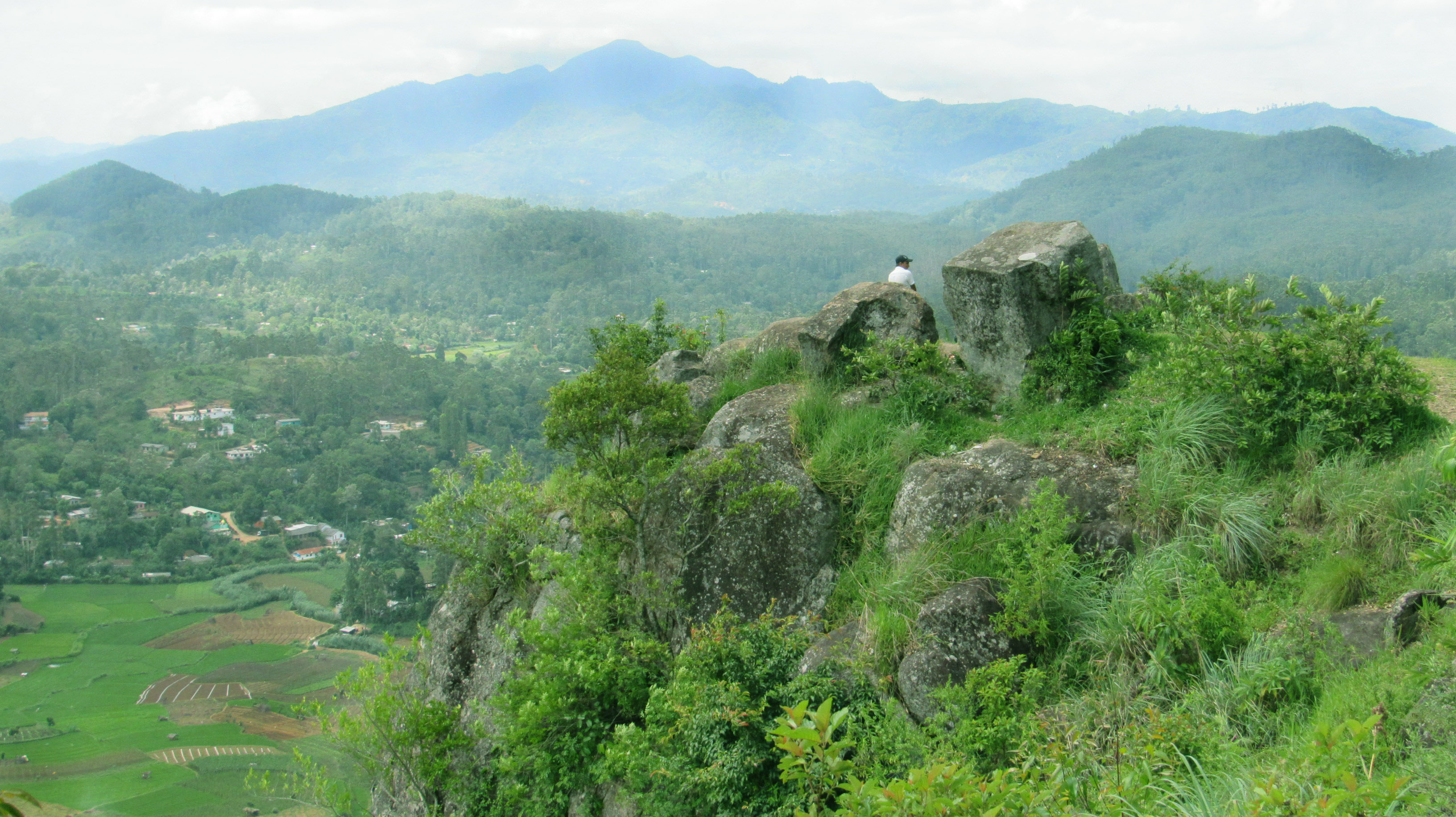
Porawagala, Bandarawela

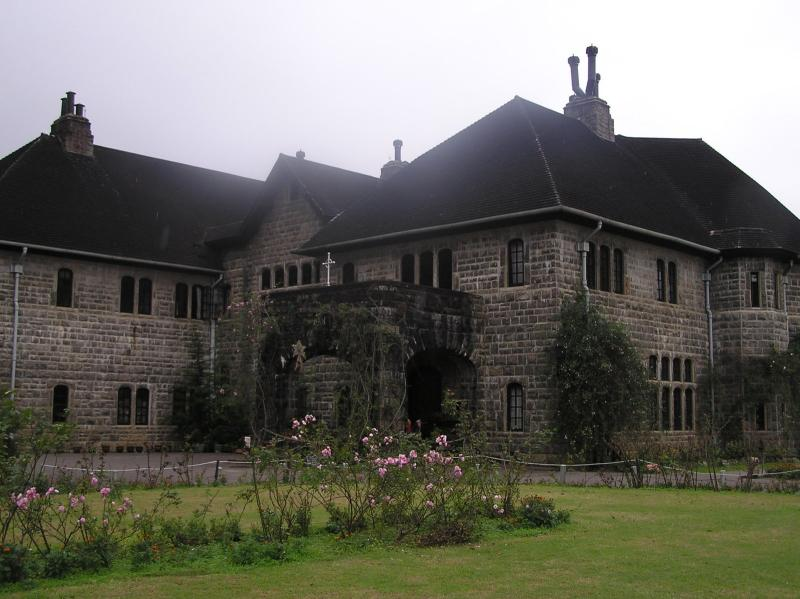
Front view of the Adisham Bungalow

- Porawagala, elevation 1,330 metres (4,360 ft), is a viewing point overlooking the town about 3 km (1.9 mi) east of Bandarawela railway station and bus stand.
- Ravana Ella (25 m (82 ft) in height) and Diyaluma Falls (191 m (627 ft) in height) are notable waterfalls in this region. Rawana Ella is situated in Ella near the Ella-Wellawaya main road (A23) and Diyaluma is situated near the village of Koslanda, on the Colombo-Batticaloa highway.
- Adisham Bungalow, Bandarawela Hotel and Lipton's Seat are a few other historic places in the local area.
- Poonagala, Ampittiakande, Uva highlands, Dambetanne Liyangahawela and Halpe are some notable tea estates in the area.

== See also ==
- List of cities in Sri Lanka
