= Viplavakari Lanka Sama Samaja Party =

Revolutionary Lanka Equal Society Party Viplavakari Lanka Sama Samaja Party
- Sinhala name: විප්ලවකාරි ලංකා සමසමජ පක්ෂය
- Leader: Philip Gunawardena
- Founder: Philip Gunawardena
- Founded: 1950
- Dissolved: 1959
- Split from: Lanka Sama Samaja Party
- Succeeded by: Mahajana Eksath Peramuna
- Ideology: Communism; Trotskyism
- Political position: Far-Left
- Colors: Red

Viplavakari Lanka Sama Samaja Party (Revolutionary Lanka Equal Society Party, Sinhala; විප්ලවකාරි ලංකා සමසමජ පක්ෂය) was a political group in Ceylon, that broke away from the Trotskyist Lanka Sama Samaja Party, since Philip Gunawardena (one of the principal LSSP leaders) refused to reconcile with the Bolshevik Samasamaja Party. When the BSP and LSSP fused in 1950, Gunawardena split to form VLSSP.

In 1952 VLSSP entered into an electoral alliance with the Communist Party. In the parliamentary elections that year, VLSSP won one seat (represented by Gunawardena's wife, Kusumasiri Gunawardena).

Philip Gunawardena lead the Viplavakari Lanka Sama Samaja Party (VLSSP) since 1951 and as constituent party formed the Mahajana Eksath Peramuna (MEP, Peoples’ United Front) in 1956 under the leadership of Mr.SWRD Bandaranaike to form the first people's government in 1956 General Election. At that election, VLSSP won five seats in the parliament as part of MEP. Philip Gunawardena became the Minister of Agriculture, Food, & Co-operatives and his party colleague P. J. William de Silva became the Minister of Fisheries & Industries. They served as a key members of the Cabinet of SWRD Bandaranaike.

But the presence of the leftist VLSSP in the government irritated the rightist sections of SLFP, who maneuvered VLSSP out through a series of intrigues. MEP fell apart and the government was defeated. In 1959 VLSSP was disbanded and Gunawardena reorganized his party with the name Mahajana Eksath Peramuna. His new party was however not a Trotskyist formation.

VLSSP should not be confused with Lanka Sama Samaja Party (Revolutionary), which was a later splinter group of LSSP.
