= Dinesh Gunawardena =

Prime Minister of Sri Lanka, 2022–2024

Hon. Dinesh Gunawardena
- දිනේෂ් ගුණවර්ධන தினேஷ் குணவர்தன
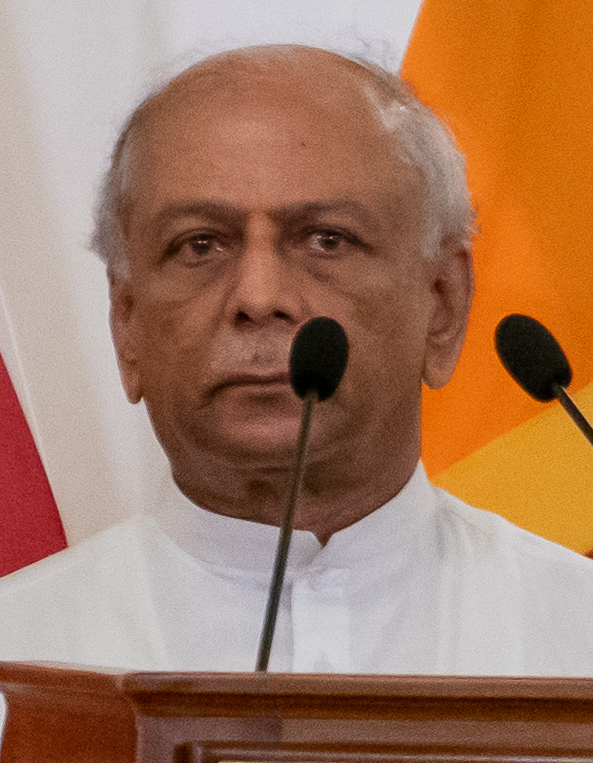
- Gunawardena in 2020

15th Prime Minister of Sri Lanka
- In office 22 July 2022 – 23 September 2024
- President: Ranil Wickremesinghe
- Preceded by: Ranil Wickremesinghe
- Succeeded by: Harini Amarasuriya
Cabinet positions
Minister of Public Administration, Home Affairs, Provincial Councils and Local Government
In office 18 April 2022 – 23 September 2024
President	Gotabaya Rajapaksa; Ranil Wickremesinghe
Prime Minister	Mahinda Rajapaksa; Ranil Wickremesinghe; Himself
Preceded by	Janaka Bandara Tennakoon
Minister of Education
In office 16 August 2021 – 18 April 2022
President	Gotabaya Rajapaksa
Prime Minister	Mahinda Rajapaksa
Preceded by	G. L. Peiris
Succeeded by	Ramesh Pathirana (Note: As Minister of Education and Plantation Industries)
Minister of Foreign Affairs
In office 22 November 2019 – 16 August 2021
President	Gotabaya Rajapaksa
Prime Minister	Mahinda Rajapaksa
Preceded by	Tilak Marapana
Succeeded by	G. L. Peiris
Minister of Water Supply and Drainage
In office April 2010 – 12 January 2015
Preceded by	A. L. M. Athaullah
Succeeded by	Rauff Hakeem
Minister of Urban Development and Water Supply (Note: Minister of Urban Development and Sacred Area Development from January 2007 to April 2010.)
In office April 2004 – April 2010
Preceded by	Gamini Atukorale
Succeeded by	Mahinda Rajapaksa
Deputy Minister of Education of Sri Lanka
In office April 2004 – January 2007
Succeeded by	M. Satchithanandan
Minister of Transport of Sri Lanka (Note: Minister of Transport and Environment from September 2001 to December 2001.)
In office October 2000 – December 2001
Preceded by	Srimani Athulathmudali
Succeeded by	Gamini Atukorale
Parliamentary positions
Leader of the House
In office 3 January 2020 – 27 July 2022
President	Gotabaya Rajapaksa
Prime Minister	Mahinda Rajapaksa; Ranil Wickremesinghe; Himself
Preceded by	Lakshman Kiriella
Succeeded by	Susil Premajayantha
Chief Government Whip
In office 17 June 2008 – 20 January 2015
Preceded by	Jeyaraj Fernandopulle
Succeeded by	Gayantha Karunathilaka
President of Mahajana Eksath Peramuna
Incumbent
Assumed office 1972
Preceded by	Philip Gunawardena
Leader of Sri Lanka Podujana Peramuna
In office July 2022 – 15 December 2023
Preceded by	Mahinda Rajapaksa
Succeeded by	Mahinda Rajapaksa
Member of Parliament
In office 10 October 2000 – 24 September 2024
Constituency	Colombo
In office 18 May 1983 – 16 August 1994
Constituency	Maharagama (1983–1989); Colombo (1989–1994)
Preceded by	Premarathne Gunasekera

Personal details
- Born: 2 March 1949 (age 77) Colombo, Dominion of Ceylon
- Party: Mahajana Eksath Peramuna
- Other political affiliations: Sri Lanka Podujana Peramuna; Sri Lanka People's Freedom Alliance
- Education: Royal College Colombo, University of Oregon
- Occupation: Trade unionist

Dinesh Chandra Rupasinghe Gunawardena (Sinhala: දිනේෂ් චන්ද්‍ර රූපසිංහ ගුණවර්ධන, Tamil: தினேஷ் சந்திர ரூபசிங்க குணவர்தன; born 2 March 1949) is a Sri Lankan politician who served as Prime Minister of Sri Lanka from 2022 to 2024. He also held the positions of Minister of Public Administration, Home Affairs, Provincial Councils and Local Government. Gunawardena has been leader of the left-wing Mahajana Eksath Peramuna (MEP) party since 1983, was briefly the de facto leader of the Sri Lanka Podujana Peramuna from 2022 to 2023, and has taken cabinet positions under several previous governments, including Leader of the House from 2020 until 2022.

Born in a political family, the son of Philip Gunawardena and Kusumasiri Gunawardena, and nephew of Vivienne Goonewardene, he was educated at Royal College, Colombo and later at the University of Oregon, where he advocated pacifism in the Vietnam War. Entering politics in 1983 as a Member of Parliament from Maharagama and later Colombo, his first role in government was as Minister of Transport under Ratnasiri Wickremanayake.

In 2022, Gunawardena was appointed the Prime Minister after former President Gotabaya Rajapaksa resigned amidst the ongoing economic crisis and Ranil Wickremesinghe was elected as his successor. In September 2024, Gunawardena resigned.

== Early life and family ==
Gunawardena was born into the political Gunawardena family on 2 March 1949. His father, Philip Gunawardena, was known as "the Father of Sri Lankan socialism" and a key independence figure, and his mother, Kusumasiri Gunawardena, was a member of parliament. His aunt, Vivienne Goonewardene, was often considered the "foremost female figure in the Sri Lankan left".

Educated at Royal Primary School, Colombo and Royal College, Colombo, he went on to study at the Netherlands School of Business. He also graduated with a B.B.A. from the University of Oregon, and whilst in the United States, became involved in student activism, taking part in anti-Vietnam War protests.

Gunawardena later married Ramani Wathsala Kotelawela from the Kotelawela/Jayawardena family; who is the niece of General Sir John Kotelawela, the third Prime Minister of Sri Lanka. They had one son, Yadamini, and one daughter, Sankapali. Ramani died of undiagnosed hepatitis in the mid-1980s.

== Political career ==
=== 1972–2000 ===
After graduation from the University of Oregon, Gunawardena worked in New York City, but returned to Sri Lanka in 1972 after his father's death. He was appointed to the Mahajana Eksath Peramuna's (MEP) central committee in August 1973, and became general-secretary of the MEP in 1974.

Gunawardena was the MEP's candidate in Avissawella at the 1977 parliamentary election, but failed to get elected until he ran as the MEP's candidate in the Maharagama Electoral District at the 1983 by-election, winning and entering Parliament. During the 1989 parliamentary election, Gunawardena successfully ran as one of the MEP's candidates in the multi-member Colombo Electoral District. He was again one of the MEP's candidates in Colombo District at the 1994 parliamentary election, but the MEP failed to win any seats in Parliament.

=== 2000–2010 ===
On 27 August 2000, the MEP joined the People's Alliance (PA). Gunawardena contested the 2000 parliamentary election as one of the PA's candidates in Colombo District. He was elected and re-entered Parliament.

Following the 2000 election, he was appointed Minister of Transport, and was given the additional portfolio of Environment in September 2001. He was re-elected at the 2001 parliamentary election.

On 20 January 2004 the Sri Lanka Freedom Party (SLFP) and the Janatha Vimukthi Peramuna (JVP) formed the United People's Freedom Alliance (UPFA), which the MEP joined on 2 February 2004. Gunawardena contested the 2004 parliamentary election as one of the UPFA's candidates in Colombo District. He was elected and re-entered Parliament. He was appointed Minister of Urban Development and Water Supply and Deputy Minister of Education after the election. In January 2007 his cabinet portfolio was changed to Minister of Urban Development and Sacred Area Development but he lost his deputy ministerial position. He was appointed Chief Government Whip in June 2008.

=== 2010–present ===
Gunawardena was re-elected in the 2010 parliamentary election, following which he was appointed Minister of Water Supply. He lost his cabinet position following the 2015 presidential election, albeit being re-elected. In March 2017 he was suspended from parliamentary sittings for one week due to repeatedly disrupting proceedings.

On 22 July 2022, Gunawardena was appointed Prime Minister after former President Gotabaya Rajapaksa resigned amidst the ongoing economic and political crises and Ranil Wickremesinghe was elected as his successor by Parliament. Gunawardena and Wickremesinghe were classmates during school days.

On 23 September 2024, following Wickremesinghe's defeat in the presidential elections and the inauguration of his successor, Anura Kumara Dissanayake, Gunawardena resigned from the position of prime minister.

== Electoral history ==
Electoral history of Dinesh Gunawardena
Election	Constituency	Party	Alliance	Votes	Result
1977 parliamentary	Avissawella	MEP		17,897	Not elected
1983 parliamentary by	Maharagama	MEP		27,054	Elected
1989 parliamentary	Colombo District	MEP		70,616	Elected
1994 parliamentary	Colombo District	MEP			Not elected
2000 parliamentary	Colombo District	MEP	PA	114,795	Elected
2001 parliamentary	Colombo District	MEP	PA	87,615	Elected
2004 parliamentary	Colombo District	MEP	UPFA	82,626	Elected
2010 parliamentary	Colombo District	MEP	UPFA	116,860	Elected
2015 parliamentary	Colombo District	MEP	UPFA	124,451	Elected
2020 parliamentary	Colombo District	MEP	SLPFA	85,287	Elected

== Notes ==
Party political offices
Preceded by Philip Gunawardena	President of Mahajana Eksath Peramuna; 1972–present	Incumbent
Preceded by Mahinda Rajapaksa	Leader of Sri Lanka Podujana Peramuna; 2022–2023	Succeeded by Mahinda Rajapaksa
Political offices
Preceded by Srimani Athulathmudali	Minister of Transport; 2000–2001	Succeeded by Gamini Atukorale
Preceded by Gamini Atukorale	Minister of Urban Development and Water Supply; 2004–2010	Succeeded by Mahinda Rajapaksa
Preceded by A. L. M. Athaullah	Minister of Water Supply and Drainage; 2010–2015	Succeeded by Rauff Hakeem
Preceded by Tilak Marapana	Minister of Foreign Affairs; 2019–2021	Succeeded by G. L. Peiris
Preceded by G. L. Peiris	Minister of Education; 2021–2022	Succeeded by Ramesh Pathirana
Preceded by Janaka Bandara Tennakoon	Minister of Public Administration, Home Affairs, Provincial Councils and Local Government; 2022–2024	Succeeded by None
Preceded by Ranil Wickremesinghe	Prime Minister of Sri Lanka; 2022–2024	Succeeded by Harini Amarasuriya
Parliament of Sri Lanka
Preceded by Jeyaraj Fernandopulle	Chief Government Whip; 2008–2015	Succeeded by Gayantha Karunathilaka
Preceded by Lakshman Kiriella	Leader of the House; 2020–2022	Succeeded by Susil Premajayantha
