= Mahajana Eksath Peramuna =

Political party in Sri Lanka

People's United Front මහජන එක්සත් පෙරමුණ மகாஜன எக்சத் பெரமுன Mahajana Eksath Peramuna
- Leader: Dinesh Gunawardena
- Secretary: Tissa Jayawardena Yapa
- Founder: Philip Gunawardena, William de Silva
- Founded: 1956; 69 years ago
- Preceded by: Viplavakari Lanka Sama Samaja Party
- Headquarters: No10/21A, Elhena Road, Maharagama, Sri Lanka
- Newspaper: Desarasa
- Youth wing: The Federation of All Lanka Youth League
- National affiliation: People's Alliance (2004); United People's Freedom Alliance (2004–2019); Sri Lanka People's Freedom Alliance (2019–2022); New Democratic Front (since 2024)
- Parliament of Sri Lanka: 0 / 225

Election symbol
- Cartwheel

The Mahajana Eksath Peramuna (People's United Front) is a political party in Sri Lanka. The party is currently led by former prime minister Dinesh Gunawardena, son of Philip Gunawardena, the founder of the party.

== History ==
=== Under Philip Gunawardena ===
The MEP was founded in 1959 by Philip Gunawardena and PH William de Silva. The party was named after the Mahajana Eksath Peramuna (1956), an SLFP-led alliance which Gunawardena was a member of, after its disbandment that year.

During the March 1960 Ceylonese parliamentary elections, the MEP won 10 parliamentary seats. In the 1960s the group joined hands with the Lanka Sama Samaja Party and the Communist Party of Sri Lanka to form the United Left Front. On September 29, 1963, 800 delegates, representing a million workers, ratified a charter of 21 demands that sought to encapsulate the demands and goals of Sri Lankan workers.

==== National Government the United National Party ====
In 1965, the party joined hands with Prime Minister Dudley Senanayake of the United National Party to form a national government under Senanayake's leadership. Philip Gunawardena was appointed as a cabinet minister.

=== Under Dinesh Gunawardana ===
Following his father's death in 1972, Dinesh Gunawardena became the new leader of the MEP. In 1983, Dinesh Gunawardena became the common candidate to contest the Maharagama by-election on the MEP symbol, a cartwheel, winning with an overwhelming majority to become one of the 8 members of the opposition in the Sri Lankan Parliament.

In 1989, the MEP contested alone under the new proportional representation electoral system and won only 3 parliamentary seats out of 225, with Dinesh Gunawardena MP for Colombo District, Bandula Gunawardane MP for Colombo District and Gitanjana Gunawardena as a National List MP.

==== Peoples' Alliance ====
In 2000, the MEP became one of the constituent members of the Peoples' Alliance, a political alliance led by the SLFP, where the MEP had 3 representatives in Parliament (Dinesh Gunawardena, Bandula Gunawardena and Somaweera Chandrasiri).

==== United People's Freedom Alliance ====
In the 2004 Sri Lankan parliamentary elections, the party was part of the United People's Freedom Alliance, which won 45.6% of the popular vote and 105 out of 225 seats. There were two MEP representatives in the parliament including one National List MP. The two representatives were Minister of Urban Development and Sacred Areas Development and Chief Government Whip Dinesh Gunawardena and Housing Minister Gitanjana Gunawardena.

In the 2010 Sri Lankan parliamentary elections, the UPFA won nearly two-thirds of the Parliament, with 143 out of 225 seats. There were three MEP representatives in the parliament including one National List MP. The three representatives were Minister of Water Supply and Chief Government Whip Dinesh Gunawardena, Deputy Foreign Minister Gitanjana Gunawardena, and Lady member Sriyani Wijewickrama.

In the 2015 Sri Lankan parliamentary elections, the UPFA was in opposition the Parliament, with 104 out of 225 seats. There were three MEP representatives in the parliament, including Joint Opposition Leader Dinesh Gunawardena and Sriyani Wijewickrama.

==== Sri Lanka People's Freedom Alliance ====
In 2019, the MEP joined the Sri Lanka People's Freedom Alliance, led by former president Mahinda Rajapaksa. In the 2020 Sri Lankan parliamentary elections, the SLFPA won a landslide victory, winning 145 out of 225 seats of the Parliament.

==== Prime Minister under United National Party led government ====
On 22 June 2022, following the appointment of Ranil Wickremesinghe as the president of Sri Lanka, Wickremesinghe appointed MEP leader Dinesh Gunawardena as prime minister.

== Electoral history ==
Sri Lanka Parliamentary Elections
Election year	Votes	Vote %	Seats won	+/–	Result for the party
1960 (March)	324,332	10.66%	10 / 151	10	Opposition
1960 (July)	106,816	3.47%	3 / 151	▼7	Opposition
1965	96,665	2.39%	1 / 151	▼2	Coalition (UNP-ITAK-SLFSP-MEP-NLF)
1970	46,571	0.93%	0 / 151	▼1	Extra-parliamentary
1977	22,639	0.36%	0 / 168	Steady	Extra-parliamentary
1989	91,128	1.63%	3 / 225	▲3	Opposition
1994	68,538	0.86%	0 / 225	▼3	Extra-parliamentary
2000	Was part of People's Alliance		3 / 225	▲3	Coalition
2001	Was part of People's Alliance		1 / 225	▼2	Opposition
2004	Was part of United People's Freedom Alliance		2 / 225	▲1	Coalition
2010	Was part of United People's Freedom Alliance		3 / 225	▲1	Coalition
2015	Was part of United People's Freedom Alliance		3 / 225	Steady	Opposition
2020	Was part of Sri Lanka People's Freedom Alliance		2 / 225	▼1	Coalition
2024	Was part of New Democratic Front		0 / 225	▼2	Extra-parliamentary
