= Jeanne Hoban =

British trade unionist and activist working in Sri Lanka (1924–1997)

- Born: 3 August 1924; Gillingham, Kent
- Died: 18 April 1997 (aged 72); Sri Lanka
- Other name: Jeanne Moonsignhe
- Occupation: Trade unionist

Jeanne Hoban (3 August 1924 in Gillingham, Kent – 18 April 1997 in Sri Lanka), known after her marriage as Jeanne Moonesinghe, was a British Trotskyist who became active in trade unionism and politics in Sri Lanka. She was one of the handful of European Radicals in Sri Lanka.

== Early years ==
She was born in Gillingham, Kent. Her father, Major William Leo Hoban was a British featherweight boxer and former soldier of Irish roots, her mother, May Irene Free, was a small businesswoman of partly Jewish extraction. Her early life was spent in a variety of Army camps. In 1936, her father was appointed an instructor at Eton College, and they settled in Slough. She attended Slough High School for Girls, where she became Head Girl in 1942.

During the Second World War, she was once machine-gunned by a Nazi Luftwaffe aircraft. Although selected for London University, she had to do her two-year National Service as a government inspector in the Bristol aircraft factory at Staines. There she joined the Communist Party of Great Britain (CPGB) in 1943. She was a member of the Transport and General Workers' Union and came from a fairly radical background – the Merseyside branch of what would later become the Militant tendency used to meet in her aunt's house in Birkenhead. To the end of her life, she maintained that the members of the CPGB were the most dedicated and conscientious political workers she ever knew.

At University College London and LSE, she studied law. There she met her future husband, Anil Moonesinghe, who converted her to Trotskyism, and also a young conscientious objector called Stan Newens, who would later become a Labour Party MP and MEP.

== RCP and Labour Party ==
The three of them joined the Revolutionary Communist Party (RCP), and Jeanne was elected to its National Executive. She fell out early with Gerry Healy, who was most prominent in the RCP at the time, but remained close to Ted Grant. She was associated with the group around Tony Cliff ( a committed Trotskyist and anti-Zionist ) the so-called State-Caps after their characterisation of the USSR as state-capitalist. The group would later become the Socialist Workers Party (SWP).

She married Anil Moonesinghe in 1948 and they moved into a houseboat called Red October, which they built together, on the Thames near Marlow. They both entered the Labour Party in Slough, on the orders of the RCP. Jeanne was elected to the Executive of the Labour Leagues of Youth, later being put on the list of Labour Party Parliamentary candidates. She and Anil were associated with the MP for Slough Fenner Brockway and with George Padmore, the prophet of Black African Liberation.

After graduating from University College, she studied International Law at the London School of Economics. However, she was unable to complete her master's degree as she was forced to accompany Anil to Sri Lanka in 1952.

== Sri Lanka ==
In Sri Lanka, Jeanne joined the Lanka Sama Samaja Party (LSSP) and worked in the Lanka Estate Workers' Union (LEWU), which organised labourers on the tea and rubber plantations. At the time the British were still very powerful on the island, in spite of the country having obtained a form of independence in 1948. The British planters, aghast at the idea of a white woman speaking on behalf of coolies, prevailed upon the government to deport Jeanne, but she went into hiding with Vivienne Goonewardena and the LSSP fought successfully to prevent the deportation, in a repeat of the Bracegirdle affair.

=== Lake House and the CMU ===
She joined the Lake House group of newspapers as a journalist, recruited by chief editor Esmond Wickremasinghe (the father of Ranil Wickremasinghe) along with other left-oriented intellectuals such as Herbert Keuneman and Regi Siriwardena. She had a column (under the pseudonym Jane Freeman) in The Observer and also worked on the Jana magazine. In 1955, she was called upon by Wickremasinghe to help write the a speech for Sir John Kotelawala, the then Prime Minister. This was the Bandung Conference of Non-Aligned Movement, and the speech, which became quite famous, was a joint effort with the brilliant B.J.B. Fernando (Bonnie).

In the mid-1950s, she joined Sri Lanka's first co-operative housing scheme, the Gothatuwa Building Society, founded by Herbert Keuneman, Seneka Bibile, Bonnie Fernando and other members of the radical intelligentsia. This led to the foundation of the Welikadawatte housing estate, which attained some fame as an island of intellectual creativity.

Jeanne formed a journalists' branch of the Ceylon Mercantile Union (CMU) at Lake House, much to the chagrin of the management which had strenuously upheld a no unions policy. She was elected national Assistant Secretary of union, a post she held for several years. In 1960, she and several other trade-unionists were sacked from Lake House and were not reinstated. At this time she edited Visi-pas-vasarak, a magazine brought out by the LSSP on its 25th anniversary.

In the 1960s, she was involved in the Union's publications and was active in many strikes of the period.

=== Teaching, journalism and broadcasting ===
In need of employment, Jeanne turned to teaching at the Terence de Zilva School in Kolonnawa. She subsequently joined the Ghana High Commission (at the time Kwame Nkrumah was President and had been advised by George Padmore) as a press officer, but returned to teaching at the Castle Street School (later Devi Balika Vidyalaya) in Borella, St Michael's Polwatte and St Paul's Milagiriya.

She went on to edit the left-wing Patriot newspaper. She was also foreign news editor of the Nation newspaper. In 1967, her she was one of those proposed to contest the Agalawatte constituency on the LSSP ticket, but Dr Colvin R de Silva was selected by the party's central committee in preference to her. She became active in the Kantha Kavaya, a circle of leftist women led by Tamara Kumari Ilangaratne. One of the proposals she made through this organisation, for a consumer council, was later adopted.

In 1968 she began broadcasting on the arts programme of Radio Ceylon. From 1970–72 she presented a radio programme, Partners for Progress.

=== Education reform ===
In 1972, as part of the ongoing educational reforms instituted by the United Front government, she was appointed to a committee to look into the teaching of English in Sri Lanka Schools. She was seconded to the Curriculum Development Centre, where she edited its bulletin. There she was on the drafting committee of a new series of English Language textbooks. She was associated with a group of educationists led by Douglas Walatara, who wanted to teach English through the medium of the students' mother tongue, the indirect method. The new English textbook, which replaced the GCE (Advanced Level) English textbook, and which she was partly responsible for, was controversial, avoiding Chaucer and Shakespeare, but including Bob Dylan (Blowin' in the Wind), John Lennon (Imagine) and Isaac Asimov (Jokester) – her personal favourite, Arthur C. Clarke's ("The Star"), was left out for fear of offending Roman Catholics.

She returned to England for a short time and was active in the Anti-Nazi League and the trade union movement. In 1981, she returned to Sri Lanka once again.

== Family life and death ==
She died in 1997 after being diagnosed with Alzheimer's disease. She had two children.
