= United Corporations and Mercantile Union =

UCMU
- United Corporations and Mercantile Union
- Founded: 1968
- Location: Sri Lanka

The United Corporations and Mercantile Union (UCMU) is a Sri Lankan trade union which brings together workers in the public sector.

The UCMU was founded in 1968. Dr N.M. Perera became its president and Anil Moonesinghe the general secretary. Moonesinghe travelled the country from factory to factory, building up a union of tens of thousands of members. One of his lieutenants in this task was Vasudeva Nanayakkara, who became an MP in 1970. At the 1970 general election, the UCMU also sponsored the candidature of the chairman of its Vidyodaya University branch, Mahinda Rajapaksa who was later to become Prime Minister and then President of Sri Lanka.

In 1970, when Moonesinghe was named as the Ceylon Transport Board chairman, he was succeeded as general secretary by Percy Wickremasekera. After the death of Dr N.M. Perera in 1979, Moonesinghe became president.

== See also ==
- Lanka Sama Samaja Party
- Anil Moonesinghe
