= Anil Moonesinghe =

Sri Lankan politician (1927–2002)

Hon. Anil Kumar Moonesinghe

Member of Parliament for Kalutara District
- In office 1989–2000

Member of Parliament for Matugama
- In office 1983–1989
- Preceded by: Reginald V. Wijegunaratne

Member of the Ceylon Parliament for Agalawatte
- In office 1956–1967
- Preceded by: C.W.W. Kannangara
- Succeeded by: Colvin R de Silva

Personal details
- Born: 15 February 1927 Colombo
- Died: 8 December 2002 (aged 75) Colombo
- Party: Lanka Sama Samaja Party
- Other political affiliations: Sri Lanka Freedom Party, Revolutionary Communist Party, Labour Party
- Spouse(s): Jeanne Hoban, Joan de Zilva
- Relations: Don Carolis Hewavitharana, Anagarika Dharmapala, Susil Moonesinghe, Mangala Moonesinghe
- Children: Janaki, Vinod, Previn, Priyanka
- Education: Royal College, Colombo
- Occupation: Politician, Trade Unionist
- Profession: Lawyer

Anil Moonesinghe (15 February 1927 – 8 December 2002) was a Sri Lankan Trotskyist revolutionary politician and trade unionist. He became a member of parliament, a Cabinet Minister of Transport in 1964, the Deputy Speaker of Parliament from 1994 to 2000 and a diplomat. He has authored several books and edited newspapers and magazines. He was chairman and general manager of a State corporation. He briefly held the honorary rank of colonel.

== Background and education ==
Moonesinghe was born in Colombo Sri Lanka (then called Ceylon), on 15 February 1927. A member of the family of Anagarika Dharmapala, who named him 'Anil Kumar', he was raised with Buddhist and Sinhalese nationalist values, as well as a strong opposition to the colonial power, Britain.

He attended Royal College, Colombo, an elite institution known for producing many radicals, civil servants and bourgeois politicians, where he excelled in athletics and earned his colors. During the Second World War, he organized a group of boys to aid the Japanese in the event of a landing on the island, earning himself the nickname 'Rommel' at school. Later, he became influenced by communism, expressing admiration for the Red Air Force. Alongside Osmund Jayaratne and Dicky Attygala, he formed a communist group at Royal College, which eventually adopted a Trotskyist stance.

Moonesinghe went on to University College Ceylon (which later became University of Ceylon), where he excelled in athletics. He represented his university at the All India Universities Athletic Meet held in Lahore in 1944, an event held regularly during that time. He briefly taught at Royal Primary School, which had been relocated to Glendale Bungalow, Bandarawela. He was awarded an exhibition to the University of London and traveled to Britain in 1945 aboard a troopship. When news of Churchill's defeat in the general election reached the ship, all the soldiers on board cheered and threw their caps in the air, which greatly encouraged him.

== Revolutionary Communist Party ==
At University College, London, he studied law. It was during this time that he met his future wife, Jeanne Hoban, a member of the Communist Party of Great Britain (CPGB) whom he influenced towards Trotskyism. He also befriended Stan Newens, who would later serve as a Labour & Co-op MP. They joined the Revolutionary Communist Party (RCP), where they were affiliated with the faction led by Tony Cliff, known as the 'State-Caps' due to their characterization of the USSR as 'State-Capitalist'. The group later became the Socialist Review Group (SRG), centered around the publication Socialist Review, which eventually evolved into the Socialist Workers Party (SWP). Both Anil and Jeanne were in attendance at the founding conference of the SRG. Through his involvement in the group, he became acquainted with Max Shachtman and his theory of 'bureaucratic revolution'. He also interacted with figures like Jock Haston and Ted Grant. Within the RCP, he used the pseudonym 'Anil Kumaran'.

=== Marriage ===
For a period, he worked as an overhead crane operator at Southern Forge Ltd in Langley, Slough. He married Jeanne Hoban in 1948, and together they moved into a houseboat named 'Red October' that they constructed themselves, located on the Thames near Marlow. They both joined the Labour Party in Slough, following a faction of the RCP led by Jock Haston. Anil became a speaker for the National Council of Labour Colleges, while Jeanne was elected to the Executive of the Labour Leagues of Youth and later placed on the list of Labour Parliamentary candidates. They were both connected with the MP for Slough, Fenner Brockway, and with George Padmore, the prophet of Black African Liberation.

== LSSP Days ==
In 1952, Anil was urgently summoned back to Colombo by his parents. After being called to the Bar, he practiced law throughout the island. Both he and Jeanne joined the Lanka Sama Samaja Party (LSSP) and worked with the Lanka Estate Workers' Union (LEWU), which organized laborers on the tea and rubber plantations. Despite Ceylon gaining a form of independence in 1948, British influence remained strong on the island. British planters pressured the government to deport Jeanne, but she went into hiding, and the LSSP successfully fought to prevent her deportation.

In 1954, the LEWU sent Anil to the Mohomediya Estate in Agalawatte, located in the Pasdun Korale, to organize a strike. His efforts were so successful that the Agalawatte branch of the LSSP requested him as the party's parliamentary candidate for the constituency. At that time, the seat was held by the United National Party (UNP) with a comfortable majority, as the plantation workers, a significant minority of the electorate, had been disenfranchised by the UNP government in 1949. In 1956, he won the election and represented Agalawatte in Parliament for 11 years. During his tenure, he worked diligently for his constituency, constructing roads and schools through self-help initiatives and advocating for the welfare of the poorest sections, particularly the neglected lower castes.

He also successfully contested the working-class Dematagoda Ward of the Colombo Municipal Council. However, his commitments in Agalawatte demanded so much of his time that he was unable to dedicate sufficient attention to his responsibilities in the ward.

Together with Jeanne, he joined Sri Lanka's first co-operative housing scheme, the Gothatuwa Building Society. This initiative was founded by Herbert Keuneman, Seneka Bibile, 'Bonnie' Fernando and other members of the radical intelligentsia. Their involvement contributed to the establishment of the Welikadawatte housing estate, which became known as a hub of intellectual creativity.

He was elected to the Central Committee of the LSSP and then onto its Political Bureau (Politburo), a position he never lost until he left the party. In 1956 he spoke in Parliament condemning the Soviet invasion of Hungary. In 1960, Yugoslavia opened an embassy in Colombo, and he advised the new ambassador unofficially on how to operate in Sri Lanka.

In 1963, he attended an Inter-Parliamentary Union conference in Yugoslavia. During this visit, he closely observed the operation of Workers' Councils and was deeply impressed by the level of open debate within these councils. This experience proved valuable to him in later years.

=== Cabinet Minister ===
At the 1964 LSSP conference, he was aligned with Dr N.M. Perera on the question of whether or not to enter the Coalition Government of Mrs Sirimavo Bandaranaike. The party did enter the government and he became one of the first three Trotskyist cabinet ministers. He received the portfolio of Communications (Transport) and set to work to build up the country's transport resources. He established Employees' Councils to help run the Ceylon Government Railway and the Ceylon Transport Board (CTB). He obtained a large parcel of land in the centre of Colombo for establishing a Central Bus Station (CBS) in close proximity to the main Fort Railway Station. The construction of the new International Airport at Katunayake (a former RAF base which had been taken over in 1957) was also started by him. He negotiated an agreement with the FIAT company to build buses in Sri Lanka. However, the government was defeated shortly thereafter and he was unable to complete his work – the next government did not sign the agreement with FIAT.

=== Back in opposition ===
At the next general election, at which the coalition was defeated, he held his Parliamentary seat. However, in 1967 he lost it on an election petition, although the LSSP retained the Agalawatte seat at the subsequent by-election. He was editor of the daily Janadina newspaper for a short while around this time.

In 1966, the police arrested several lower-ranking soldiers and civilians, implicated in an alleged attempted coup d'état, the so-called 'Lavatory Coup'. Several army officers, including the Army Commander Major General Richard Udugama, were dismissed or suspended. Moonesinghe was lawyer for the 9th accused, Mayadunne, in the subsequent trial.

He visited Czechoslovakia during the 'Prague Spring' and was again impressed by the activities of the Workers' Councils there. He later wrote a book condemning the Soviet invasion which ousted Alexander Dubček.

He succeeded Dr N.M. Perera as president of the redoubtable All Ceylon United Motor Workers' Union (ACUMWU). He also set about organising the United Corporations and Mercantile Union (UCMU) which brought together workers in government corporations, and of which he was general secretary. He went around the country from factory to factory and built up a union of several tens of thousands of members. One of his lieutenants in this task was Vasudeva Nanayakkara, who became an MP in 1970. At the 1970 general election, the UCMU also sponsored the candidature of novice Mahinda Rajapakse, who was the chairman of its Vidyodaya University branch and who was later to become Prime Minister and then President of Sri Lanka.

=== CTB chairman ===
After the 1970 election, at which the United Front (UF) won a landslide victory, the workers at the CTB spontaneously established workers' committees and took over the running of the institution. They also asked for Moonesinghe to be made chairman of the board. The new Government therefore appointed him chairman and general manager. Thus began the most successful years of the CTB as an institution. For the last two of the five years he was there, the CTB ran at a profit, while providing a service which was never previously or subsequently matched. In this he was aided by his Minister, Leslie Goonewardene.

Senior citizens still recall the CTB under Moonesinghe, for providing an efficient service. He would dress in a bush shirt and trousers and operate as a one-man flying squad to catch errant bus crews in the act, lying in wait in his metallic blue Volkswagen Variant or his Citroën 2CV at places like Dematagoda Junction. Stories would abound (all untrue) of him being spotted disguised with a beard. To prove that eight buses could be serviced in a day, he once personally carried out eight vehicle services at the Central Workshops, Werahera.

In addition to the role in management of the Employees' Councils (which the workers' committees were transformed into after being properly constituted, with democratic elections supervised by the Elections Commission), commuter organisations were included in an advisory role. The services were expanded and measures were taken to improve efficiency, including rationalising bus types. The CTB started buying buses from the Isuzu company of Japan, to offset any cartelisation by India's Tata and Ashok Leyland, the main suppliers, and also purchased Ikarus buses from Hungary. Several new bus stands and bus depots were established. A modern, multi-storied bus station was planned at the CBS, complete with hotel and cinema, but this would never be completed.

Moonesinghe also took measures to build up local industry and the CTB became well equipped with foundries and workshops: the Central Workshop at Werahera became the largest in South Asia. The local modification of ticket machines was started after employees pointed out many unsuitable features, and a new workshop was acquired for this. In 1974 he started the assembly of bus chassis and prototypes of a locally manufactured bus and a car rolled out of Werahera.

In 1971, when the Janatha Vimukthi Peramuna (JVP) staged an insurrection, he formed a 2,000-strong paramilitary body, the Hansa Regiment (of which he was honorary Colonel), from among the employees of the CTB to guard bus depots, bus stops and workshops. He also created 'CANTAB', a secret intelligence organisation, the agents of whom were employees of the CTB, which provided accurate reports of the strength and distribution of JVP units.

At this time he joined the editorial board of State, a theoretical journal of the LSSP, published in three languages.

In 1975, Leslie Gunawardena and he were preparing the ground for a major shift in the management of the CTB, whereby Employees' Council representatives were to form half the board of directors. However, in September that year the UF broke up and the LSSP Ministers were removed, so Anil resigned from the CTB.

=== Back in opposition ===
He was briefly employed at this time, by the Government of Guyana, as a consultant on transport.

He contested the 1977 election for the Matugama constituency, which lay next to Agalawatte. He was narrowly beaten into third place by the sitting member of the SLFP. He became deputy secretary of the LSSP in 1978, having supported the group led by NM Perera at that year's conference. In 1980, he was arrested for his part in the General Strike, but later released without any charges being made. At this time he wrote a book on the repression of the Solidarity union in Poland.

About this time, he coined the term 'Casino Capitalism' to describe the economic set-up under the UNP regime.

== SLFP Days ==
He split from the LSSP in 1982 over its refusal to go into coalition with Mrs Sirimavo Bandaranaike's Sri Lanka Freedom Party (SLFP), forming the Sri Lanka Sama Samaja Party (SLSSP) with other breakaways. He supported Hector Kobbekaduwa at the Presidential Election of that year. In 1983 the SLSSP dissolved itself and he joined the SLFP and contested the Matugama seat at a by-election and won. He represented Matugama until 1989 and then was one of the MPs – under proportional representation – for the Kalutara District until 2000. During the 1983 anti-Tamil pogrom, he intervened to save several people from death. During the 'White Terror' of 1988–90, he was active in saving hundreds of suspects from summary execution – at one point having to threaten an Army commandant with attack.

In the early 1990s he was elected a vice-president of the SLFP and was part of a re-organisation drive led by Anura Bandaranaike, DM Jayaratne, Berty Premalal Dissanayake and Mahinda Rajapakse.

In opposition, he was the spokesperson for Transport (he was also President of the Sri Lanka National Transport Workers' Union) and, being acknowledged as the best man to take care of the public transport sector, was expected to receive that portfolio in the event of the SLFP returning to power. However, after the victory in 1994 of the People's Alliance, the new prime minister, Chandrika Kumaratunga did not care to revive the CTB and did not make Moonesinghe a Minister.

Instead, he became deputy speaker and chairman of Committees of Parliament. Soon after this, he was elected president of the Mahabodhi Society, a Buddhist Missionary organisation headquartered in Colombo.

He was disoriented by the rather Byzantine internal politics of the SLFP. In the LSSP debate was out open and was democratic, with matters being finally settled with a vote. His habit of speaking his mind, which had only irritated others in the LSSP, proved to be a liability in his new political home. After becoming Deputy Speaker, he grew close to Mrs Bandaranaike, who had herself been deserted by many of her closest allies. Her death affected him deeply.

== Diplomat ==
In 2000 he was appointed Sri Lanka's ambassador to Austria, the UN and accredited to the former Yugoslav republics, Hungary, the Czech Republic and Slovakia. On 14 March 2002 he presented his credentials as the first Sri Lankan ambassador to Croatia. He had a close relationship with Václav Havel, the president of the Czech Republic, due to his connections with the oppositional movement in Czechoslovakia since the Prague Spring.

After the victory of the UNP at the general election of December 2001, he was recalled.

He died on 8 December 2002 in Colombo. He left four children, Janaki, Vinod, Previn and Priyanka, the last two by a second marriage to Joan de Zilva.

== Publications ==
- Kumaran, Anil (pseudonym). "The Indonesian Movement", Workers’ International News, January–February 1949.
- Moonasinghe, Anil. "Accumulation in backward countries", Young Socialist, January-March 1962
- Moonesinghe, Anil, Chekoslovækiyava, Janadina Publications, Colombo, 1968.
- Moonesinghe, Anil, "The Nature of the State", State, Colombo, 1975, No 1.
- Moonesinghe, Anil, Polanthaya – 1980, Janadina Publications, Colombo, 1980.

== See also ==
- Sri Lankan Non Career Diplomats
- List of political families in Sri Lanka
