= Domestic Policy of the Sirimavo Bandaranaike Government =

The Domestic Policy of the Sirimavo Bandaranaike Government was the domestic policy of Sri Lanka under the first two terms of Prime Minister Sirimavo Bandaranaike between 1960 and 1965 and from 1970 to 1977. Bandaranaike's domestic policies focused on socialism, land reform, education, healthcare and reducing socioeconomic inequalities through greater state intervention.

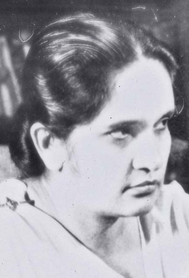
Prime Minister Sirimavo Bandaranaike in 1960

== Education ==
In 1971, the government introduced a system of standardisation of marks for admissions to the universities which was directed against Tamil-medium students. K. M. de Silva describes it as follows:

"The qualifying mark for admission to the medical faculties was 250 (out of 400) for Tamil students, whereas it was only 229 for the Sinhalese. Worse still, this same pattern of a lower qualifying mark applied even when Sinhalese and Tamil students sat for the examination in English. In short, students sitting for examinations in the same language, but belonging to two ethnic groups, had different qualifying marks."

Therefore, the government policy of standardisation was in essence a discriminatory regulation to curtail the number of Tamil students selected for certain faculties in the universities. The benefits enjoyed by Sinhalese students as a result of this also meant a significant fall in the number of Tamil students within the Sri Lankan university student populace.

University selection of 1971 was allocated proportionate to the number of participants who sat for the entrance examination in that language. As guaranteed before the exam, Tamil share was reduced to the proportion of the Tamils medium students (according to 1971 census, 27% of the total population used Tamil as first medium).

According to 1971 exam results, a large proportion of the Tamil allocation was enjoyed by Tamils in Jaffna and a large proportion of the Sinhalese share was enjoyed by the Sinhalese in Colombo.

Bandaranaike’s United Front government introduced changes to university admission criteria as part of its affirmative action policies. Initially, the system favoured Sinhalese students, before being revised to incorporate regional quotas across ethnic and religious groups. The policies were criticised for placing less emphasis on academic merit and contributing to a decline in Tamil students’ admission to science and medical faculties.

In the 1971, some Sinhalese complained of Tamils overrepresentation in universities, especially in engineering and the sciences. This resulted in the government also introducing lower university entrance qualifying marks for Sinhalese-medium students applying to science faculties, as shown in the table below:

Course of study	Medium	Minimum marks, 1971
Engineering	Sinhalese Tamils	227 250
Medicine and Dentistry	Sinhalese Tamils	229 250
Bio-science	Sinhalese Tamils	175 181
Physical Sciences	Sinhalese Tamils	183 204

From 1972, Bandaranaike’s government introduced reforms to the education system, including changes to assessment and examinations. The reforms sought to broaden assessment from a selective system to one serving a larger proportion of students, while introducing elements of decentralised assessment in pre-vocational studies. These studies were intended to contribute to selection for higher education and to be assessed continuously by teachers. The implementation of the reforms was criticised for being rushed and insufficiently developed.

Also in 1972, the government added district quota as a parameter within each languages. 30% of university places were allocated on the basis of island-wide merit; half the places were allocated on the basis of comparative scores within districts and an additional 15% reserved for students from under privileged districts.

By 1973, Sri Lanka’s literacy rate had exceeded 80 percent, among the highest in Asia. This was attributed in part to the country’s longstanding policy of providing free education through the university level.

On 6 October 1974, Bandaranaike formally declared the University of Jaffna open at the premises of Parameshwara College, which had been founded by Ponnambalam Ramanathan in 1921. The establishment of the university provided the Northern Province with a new institution of higher education. In December 1974, Bandaranaike inaugurated the Bandaranaike Centre for International Studies, an institution established to promote the study of international relations, international law and diplomacy.

== Healthcare ==
In 1961, Bandaranaike’s government enacted the Ayurveda Act No. 31 of 1961, providing a statutory framework for Ayurveda and traditional medicine in Ceylon. The Act established the Department of Ayurveda and provided for the regulation of Ayurvedic practitioners and healthcare institutions, as well as the development of Ayurvedic education and research. It came into operation in October 1962.

In 1971, the government established a National Pharmaceuticals Policy following the recommendations of a commission chaired by Dr S. A. Wickremasinghe and Professor Senaka Bibile. The commission had been appointed to examine the country’s pharmaceutical trade and recommended the establishment of a national policy and a state institution to regulate the sector.

The policy sought to ensure the availability of good-quality medicines at the lowest possible prices and to encourage doctors to prescribe only the medicines necessary to treat patients. At the time, pharmaceutical companies commonly marketed medicines under proprietary brand names and provided information promoting branded products, which were often considerably more expensive than their generic equivalents. The policy therefore sought to promote the use of generic medicines and rational prescribing.

The approach attracted international attention and was subsequently regarded as a pioneering example of a national pharmaceutical policy. World Health Organization and other United Nations agencies supported the Sri Lankan experience, while the United Nations Conference on Trade and Development examined it as a potential model for other developing countries. With the assistance of Seneka Bibile, UNCTAD published Case Studies in the Transfer of Technology: Pharmaceutical Policies in Sri Lanka, examining the country’s experience and its potential application elsewhere.

The first Five-Year Health Plan for 1972–1976 placed greater emphasis on preventive healthcare. Its priorities included improving immunisation services and health education, addressing nutritional anaemia among pregnant women, and expanding rural water-supply and sanitation schemes. The plan also contributed to the gradual strengthening of primary healthcare during the 1970s.

== Land reform ==
In 1972, Bandaranaike introduced major land reforms in Sri Lanka, with the enactment of the Land Reform Act of No. 01 of 1972 which imposed a ceiling of twenty hectares on privately owned land, this was later followed up by the Land Reform (Amendment) Act in 1975 that nationalized plantations owned by public companies. The objective of these land reforms were to grant lands to landless peasants. Critiques claimed that the second wave of reforms were targeted the wealthy landowners that had traditionally supported the United National Party. As a result of these reforms the state became the largest plantation owner and two entities, the Sri Lanka State Plantations Corporation, the Janatha Estate Development Board (People's Estate Development Board) and the USAWASAMA (Upcountry Cooperative Estate Development Board) were established to manage these estates. In the years following these land reforms, the production of the key export crops which Sri Lanka depended on for the in follow of foreign currency dropped.

== Mahaweli Development Programme ==
In 1961, Bandaranaike’s government initiated the process that eventually led to the Mahaweli Development programme by seeking assistance from the United Nations Special Fund to survey the Mahaweli ganga Basin and the Dry Zone of Ceylon. The programme was subsequently developed as a multipurpose rural-development project based on the water resources of the Mahaweli Ganga and six associated river basins. Its objectives included expanding irrigation and agricultural production, generating hydroelectric power, creating employment, settling landless farming families and providing flood control. The programme also involved the development of new townships, village centres and settlements, together with supporting services such as education, healthcare and agricultural assistance. It was originally planned for implementation over 35 years.

The first phase, initiated under Bandaranaike’s government and implemented from 1970, was completed in 1976. It included diversion headworks at Polgolla and Bowatenna, a 40 MW hydroelectric power station at Ukuwela, and improvements to water supplies serving approximately 52,700 hectares of existing irrigated land.

By the end of 1995, all the headworks of the Accelerated Mahaweli Programme (AMP) had been completed and were functioning. Feasibility studies were scheduled to be completed in respect of the proposed Moragahakanda Project.

== Language policy ==
The Official Language Act No. 33 of 1956, commonly known as the Sinhala Only Act, made Sinhala the sole official language of Ceylon, replacing English and excluding Tamil from official-language status. Following the anti-Tamil riots of 1958, Prime Minister S. W. R. D. Bandaranaike’s government introduced the Tamil Language (Special Provisions) Act No. 28 of 1958. The Act provided for the use of Tamil as a medium of instruction in schools and universities, as a language for examinations for entry into the public service, subject to provisions concerning proficiency in Sinhala, and for official correspondence and administrative purposes in the Northern and Eastern Provinces.

After Sirimavo Bandaranaike became prime minister in January 1960, her government continued the implementation of the Sinhala Only policy. In 1961, it enacted the Language of the Courts Act No. 3 of 1961, which provided for Sinhala as the language of the courts. Regulations giving effect to the Tamil Language (Special Provisions) Act were eventually approved in January 1966 under the government of Dudley Senanayake. However, the adoption of the 1972 Constitution during Bandaranaike’s second premiership entrenched Sinhala as the official language, while provisions concerning Tamil remained subordinate to the constitutional language framework.

"the Tamils felt indignant that it was specifically stated in the constitution that the provisions relating to the Tamil language could be amended by ordinary legislation whereas the provisions relating to the Sinhalese were constitutionally entrenched."

The policy turned out to be "severely discriminatory" and placed the Tamil-speaking population at a "serious disadvantage". As a Sinhalese academic A. M. Navaratna Bandara writes: "The Tamil-speaking people were given no option but to learn the language of the majority if they wanted to get public service employment. [...] A large number of Tamil public servants had to accept compulsory retirement because of their inability to prove proficiency in the official language [....]" It also entailed that a Sinhalese officer working in Tamil areas was exempted from learning Tamil, but a Tamil officer working in even Tamil areas had to learn Sinhala. The effects of these policies were dramatic as shown by the drastic drop of Tamil representation in public sector: "In 1956, 30 percent of the Ceylon administrative service, 50 percent of the clerical service, 60 percent of engineers and doctors, and 40 percent of the armed forces were Tamil. By 1970 under Sirimavo Bandaranaike’s government, those numbers had plummeted to 5 percent, 5 percent, 10 percent, and 1 percent, respectively." For much of the 1960s government forms and services were virtually unavailable to Tamils, and this situation only partly improved with later relaxations of the law.
