= Yatiyantota Electoral District =

Electoral district of Sri Lanka

Yatiyantota' electoral district was an electoral district of Sri Lanka between March 1960 and February 1989. The district was named after the town of Yatiyantota in Kegalle District, Sabaragamuwa Province. The 1978 Constitution of Sri Lanka introduced the proportional representation electoral system for electing members of Parliament. The existing 160 mainly single-member electoral districts were replaced with 22 multi-member electoral districts. Yatiyantota electoral district was replaced by the Kegalle multi-member electoral district at the 1989 general elections.

== Members of Parliament ==
Key

Independent SLFP UNP

Election	Member	Party	Term
1960 (March)	N. M. Perera	Lanka Sama Samaja Party	1960
1960 (July)	N. M. Perera	Lanka Sama Samaja Party	1960-1965
1965	N. M. Perera	Lanka Sama Samaja Party	1965-1970
1970	N. M. Perera	Lanka Sama Samaja Party	1970-1977
1977	K. Vincent Perera	United National Party	1977-1989

== Elections ==
=== 1960 (March) Parliamentary General Election ===
Results of the 4th parliamentary election held on 19 March 1960:

Candidate	Party	Symbol	Votes	%
N. M. Perera	Lanka Sama Samaja Party	Key	10,432	52.25
G. L. Kotelawela	United National Party	Elephant	7,761	38.87
Higgoda Dharmasena	Communist Party of Ceylon	Star	820	4.11
C. L. B. Ratnayake	Sri Lanka Freedom Party	Hand	731	3.66
S. J. Dharmapala		Umbrella	87	0.44
Valid Votes			19,831	99.32
Rejected Votes			135	0.68
Total Polled			19,966	100.00
Registered Electors			23,908	
Turnout				83.51

=== 1960 (July) Parliamentary General Election ===
Results of the 5th parliamentary election held on 20 July 1960:

Candidate	Party	Symbol	Votes	%
N. M. Perera	Lanka Sama Samaja Party	Key	10,311	52.07
G. L. Kotelawela	United National Party	Elephant	9,196	46.44
S. M. Munasinghe	Mahajana Eksath Peramuna	Cartwheel	202	1.02
Valid Votes			19,709	99.54
Rejected Votes			92	0.46
Total Polled			19,801	100.00
Registered Electors			23,908	
Turnout				82.82

=== 1965 Parliamentary General Election ===
Results of the 6th parliamentary election held on 22 March 1965:

Candidate	Party	Symbol	Votes	%
N. M. Perera	Lanka Sama Samaja Party	Key	14,826	52.40
G. L. Kotelawela	United National Party	Elephant	13,131	46.41
K. A. Wijesekera	Mahajana Eksath Peramuna	Cartwheel	130	0.46
Valid Votes			28,087	99.27
Rejected Votes			207	0.73
Total Polled			28,294	100.00
Registered Electors			32,197	
Turnout				87.88

=== 1970 Parliamentary General Election ===
Results of the 7th parliamentary election held on 27 May 1970:

Candidate	Party	Symbol	Votes	%
N. M. Perera	Lanka Sama Samaja Party	Key	17,520	56.27
G. L. Kotelawela	United National Party	Elephant	13,531	43.46
Valid Votes			31,051	99.72
Rejected Votes			86	0.28
Total Polled			31,137	100.00
Registered Electors			34,938	
Turnout				89.12

=== 1977 Parliamentary General Election ===
Results of the 8th parliamentary election held on 21 July 1977:

Candidate	Party	Symbol	Votes	%
K. Vincent Perera	United National Party	Elephant	17,545	52.04
N. M. Perera	Lanka Sama Samaja Party	Key	15,028	44.57
Dharmasiri Muthuthanthirige	Sri Lanka Freedom Party	Hand	897	2.66
T.D.S. Wickrema		Book	122	0.36
Dharmasri Fonsek		Flower	77	0.23
Vijaya Ratnayake		Cartwheel	48	0.14
Valid Votes			33,608	99.68
Rejected Votes			109	0.32
Total Polled			33,717	100.00
Registered Electors			38,405	
Turnout				87.79
