= Percy Wickremasekera =

Percy Wickremasekera is Sri Lankan lawyer, politician and trade unionist. He was the General Secretary of the United Corporations and Mercantile Union and a member of the Politburo of the LSSP.

Educated at the Royal College, Colombo and at the Colombo Law College, he became a lawyer.

A Political Bureau member of the LSSP he contest the 2004 general elections from the United People's Freedom Alliance in the Colombo District.
