= Selina Perera =

Sri Lankan socialist and Trotskyite

Selina Margaret Perera (née Peiris) (1909–1986) was a Sri Lankan socialist and Trotskyist. She was a founding member of the Lanka Sama Samaja Party (LSSP) and party secretary. She was married to Dr N. M. Perera, who became the leader of the LSSP.

Born Selina Margaret Peiris to a wealthy family in Badulla, she was educated in the Catholic Convent school and at the Musaeus College in Colombo. She entered Colombo University College. After graduating, she became a teacher at the Buddhist Girls’ College in Mount Lavinia and became its first principal.

She joined the South Colombo Youth League and became active in local politics after Philip Gunawardena joined the South Colombo Youth League. She was active in the Suriya Mala movement, which in 1933 started a relief program for the malaria epidemic that ravage the island leading to over 10,000 deaths in two months. There she met Dr N. M. Perera, who had recently returned from London having completed his doctorate. In 1935, when the Lanka Sama Samaja Party was formed, she was a founding member and was elected to its central committee and served as the party treasurer. She married N. M. Perera on 6 March 1936. She assisted in hiding Mark Anthony Bracegirdle during the Bracegirdle incident. In 1938, with funding from her father, she enrolled at the School of Oriental and African Studies to study Sanskrit and Pali, and graduated in June 1939 with a BA degree in Indo-Aryan Languages with a Lower Second Class Honors. There she came into contact with local Trotskyist groups, briefly staying with Charlie van Gelderen. In 1939, she made her way to the United States linking up with the Socialist Workers Party, in hopes of traveling to Mexico to meet Trotsky, but failed due to visa problems.

On her return to Ceylon, she rejoined the party and worked on its anti-war movement. In June 1940, several party leaders were arrested including N.M. Perera. LSSP responded with large protest march which was baton charged by the police. Leading the march Selina was arrested and jailed. But she was released soon after. In the next year she led many of the party activities before escaping to India with her husband and worked with the Bolshevik-Leninist Party of India, Ceylon and Burma (BLPI). When most of the LSSP members were arrested and deported to Ceylon in July 1943, she with Vivienne Goonewardena and Colvin R. de Silva escaped to Calcutta. She became disillusioned with the pre-partition politics in India. She opted to stay in India, adopting the name Sheela Perera, making a living as an English teacher until her death in 1986. She returned to Ceylon only once.
