= Sri Lanka National Pharmaceuticals Policy =

The Sri Lanka National Pharmaceuticals Policy was established in the 1970s following the submission of a report by Dr S.A. Wickremasinghe and Prof. Seneka Bibile. It aimed at ensuring that people get good quality drugs at the lowest possible price and that doctors would prescribe the minimum required drugs to treat the patient's illness. It was a pioneer in the field of rational National pharmaceuticals policy.

== Background ==
At the time, pharmaceutical companies were making considerable money by selling drugs under their trade names, giving out biased information about the branded drugs as against those named generically. Doctors often prescribed branded drugs, which were far more expensive than generic drugs, which have the same efficacy.

The United Front Government of 1970 appointed the Wickremasinghe-Bibile commission of inquiry into this issue and it recommended the establishment a national policy and of a state body to regularize the trade.

In the 1970s Sri Lanka demonstrated that a state buying agency linked to a national formulary was a viable and powerful instrument for reducing drug costs without compromising quality, for saving foreign exchange, for rationalizing drug usage and for supplying essential drugs at reasonable prices to the whole community. This was made possible by the formulation and implementation of an integrated national pharmaceutical policy.

A unique phenomenon about Sri Lanka's pharmaceuticals policy was that the entire programme was conceived, formulated, developed and implemented by Sri Lankan nationals without any form of external aid or assistance.

== National formulary ==
A careful selection of drugs is an essential prerequisite of a national pharmaceutical policy. In Sri Lanka, the Ministry of Health requested Prof. Seneka Bibile to look into his matter and he prepared the Ceylon Hospital Formulary (CHF) of about 630 drugs under their generic names. Subsequently the Ministry of Health established a National Formulary Committee (NFC), consisting of representatives from the public and private health sectors and the University Medical Schools, led by Bibile. It published Formulary Notes for doctors, keeping them updated on developments.

== State buying agency ==
Accordingly, in 1971 the State Pharmaceuticals Corporation of Sri Lanka (SPC) was established with Bibile as Chairman. The SPC channeled all imports and production of pharmaceuticals, calling for worldwide bulk tenders which were limited to the approved drugs listed in the CHF. The public and private health sectors had to obtain all their requirements from the SPC.

Hence the stranglehold of the Multinational corporations on the drug trade was successfully broken and they were made to compete with each other and with generic drug producers, enabling the country to obtain drugs much cheaper. Branded drugs were replaced by generic drugs in the prescription and sale of medicines.

In 1972 it imported 52 drugs at a third of their previous prices. In 1973, the SPC itself bought the raw material necessary for 14 private processing laboratories established in the island. Some drug prices dropped by half or two-thirds. The SPC bought from an Indian company the raw material necessary for a widely used tranquilizer at a much lower price than that charged by a Swiss multinational.

== Drug information ==
It is essential that correct information on drugs and therapeutics be given to all medical personnel. The promotional material provided by the drugs manufacturers tends to be distorted in favour of their own products and adds to the costs of supplying drugs.

In Sri Lanka, drug information was provided from official sources. The Prescriber, a quarterly publication edited by the NFC, was published by the SPC and distributed to all medical personnel. The extravagant promotional practices of drugs manufacturers were stopped to remove the dangers and costs inherent in process.

== International experience ==
The Sri Lanka experience became a model for the rest of the world. The policy was supported by the World Health Organization and other United Nations agencies with enormous benefit to Third World countries. The United Nations Conference on Trade and Development Secretariat examined the Sri Lankan experience, concluding that an analysis of the Sri Lankan model could give other developing countries an insight into ways of formulating, developing and implementing integrated national pharmaceutical policies. With Bibile’s assistance, it published "Case Studies in the Transfer of Technology: Pharmaceutical Policies in Sri Lanka". This document has proved to be a very valuable guideline for developing countries intending to initiate pharmaceutical reforms. Translated into other languages, it may be found with health planners of almost every Third World country.

== Reaction of pharmaceutical companies ==
The first response from the multi-national corporations came in May 1973. Executives of the major pharmaceutical companies in the United States met Sri Lanka's ambassador in Washington, D.C. and handed him a letter addressed to the Prime Minister of Sri Lanka from the President of the Pharmaceutical Manufacturer's Association (PMA) of the US. The letter concluded with a statement that the PMA believed that the proposed actions would have most serious effects not only on the pharmaceutical industry and on all private industry in Sri Lanka but potentially for the health of its citizens.

The International Federation of Pharmaceutical Manufacturers Associations (IFPMA) issued a statement to UNCTAD strongly criticizing the UNCTAD report on the Sri Lankan pharmaceutical policies.

== Post-1977 policy ==
This policy was watered down by the multi-national-friendly United National Party Government of 1977. There was continued government control of the types of drugs imported, but permission was given to the private sector to import multiple brands. The SPC was never dissolved and continued to supply affordable drugs, continuing to be responsible for centralized procurement for the government health sector.

In 1987 the Pharmaceuticals Manufacturing Corporation was established to import raw materials and manufacture generic drugs. This has effectively withstood very strong pressures for privatization.

The earlier centrally controlled system enabled effective monitoring. However, at present, because of decentralization of drug supply, while standard treatment guidelines are available, there is no effective monitoring system for prescription practices is in place; there is little quality assessment and no incentive for rational use.

In 2005 the United People's Freedom Alliance Government promised to establish a National Medicinal Drugs Policy (NMPD) that would enable Sri Lankans significantly to cut down on drug expenses and get quality drugs at affordable prices while saving billions of rupees in foreign exchange for the country. Implementation of the NMDP could reduce the number of drugs imported, prescribed and sold in Sri Lanka to about 350 varieties.

== See also ==
- National pharmaceuticals policy
- Medicare Part D
- Medicare Prescription Drug, Improvement, and Modernization Act
- Prescription drug prices in the United States
- Seneka Bibile
- State Pharmaceuticals Corporation of Sri Lanka
