= GCSU (disambiguation) =

GCSU or Georgia College & State University is a public university in Milledgeville, Georgia.

GCSU may also refer to:

- GCSU Sri Lanka, the Government Clerical Service Union in Sri Lanka.
- Grenfell Campus Student Union, the students' union for the Grenfell Campus of Memorial University in Corner Brook, Newfoundland and Labrador.
- Glendon College Student Union, the students' union for the Glendon College campus of York University in Toronto, Ontario.
