= William Tennekoon =

Sri Lankan banker

William Tennekoon was a Sri Lankan banker. He was the Governor of the Central Bank of Ceylon.

Educated at St. Anthony's College, Kandy and Trinity College, Kandy, he studied economics at Ceylon University College. In 1938, he served as an visiting lecturer at the economics department of the Ceylon University College. In 1939, he joined the Bank of Ceylon as an accountant and thereafter became the manager of its head office. In 1950, he joined the newly formed Central Bank of Ceylon as its first Chief Accountant and functioned as head of the banking and currency department. He then became the director of the bank supervision department. He was seconded to the IMF in 1953, 1962 and in 1954 he was seconded to the World Bank. In 1957, he was appointed Deputy Governor, Senior Deputy Governor in 1964 and Governor in 1967. He did not request an extension to his appointment and retired in 1971 following Finance Minister N. M. Perera's demonetized with the denominations of Rupees 50 and 100 to flush out black money which was done without Tennekoon's knowledge. He was succeeded by Herbert Tennekoon. Following his retirement from the Central Bank of Ceylon, he served as Executive Director of the Asian Development Bank and in 1973, he became the Chairman and Director of Hatton National Bank. He served as Chairman of the Development Finance Corporation of Ceylon from 1974.
