= Hansa Regiment =

Hansa Regiment (Swan Regiment) was a paramilitary unit formed by employees of the Ceylon Transport Board (CTB) during the 1971 JVP insurrection. The Hansa Regiment numbered around 2,000 lightly armed CTB trade unions members with leftist affiliations that assisted the Government of Ceylon to suppress the armed revolt of the communist Janatha Vimukthi Peramuna (JVP).

Formed in April 1971, by the Trotskyist Chairmen of the CTB, Anil Moonesinghe it numbered around 2,000 mainly from the members of the CTB trade unions affiliated to the governing Sri Lanka Freedom Party (SLFP) and Communist Party (CP). As the insurrection brock out the SLFP government of Prime Minister Sirima Bandaranaike which had not heeded early warring of the insurrection, found itself unprepared to deal with the magnitude of insurrection. Its military and police lacked numbers and was short on arms in the initial days of the insurrection, which allowed the JVP to capture large parts of the island uncontested. Moonesinghe organised volunteers from among the CTB bus drivers, conductors and mechanics to supplement the police and armed forces. Having them undergo a short basic training at CTB head offices at Narahenpita, Moonesinghe requested for weapons to arm the newly formed Hansa Regiment. Short of weapons, the Prime Minister approved the allocation of 450 shotguns to the unit. Which thereafter dispatched a contingent to the Kegalle District having the personal billeted at the Thulhiriya textile mills under the command of Rajawardhana, who was Moonesinghe's private secretary. They deployed units to police stations in Kegalle and Kurunegala districts, where they saw action against the JVP and sustained casualties. A second contingent was deployed to the Gampaha District under the command of leftist Reggie Mendis. By the end of 1971, with much of the insurrection suppressed the Hansa Regiment was disbanded by the government, although Moonesinghe wanted to retain it as a possible republican guard with affiliations to the Lanka Sama Samaja Party.

CTB bus crews prove to be a good source of local intelligence on the JVP strength and deployment. These reports coded "Cantab" were submitted to the government and were acknowledged by the army.
