= Essential medicines policies =

Policies to ensure the quality of medication

An essential medicines policy is one that aims at ensuring that people get good quality drugs at the lowest possible price, and that doctors prescribe the minimum of required drugs in order to treat the patient's illness. The pioneers in this field were Sri Lanka and Chile.

== Background ==
A rational drug policy is one based on drug use in which patients receive medications appropriate to their clinical needs, in doses that meet their own individual requirements, for an adequate period of time, and at the lowest cost to them and their community. Pharmaceutical companies make considerable money by selling drugs under their trade names, promoting the branded drugs as against those named generically. Doctors often prescribe branded drugs which are more expensive than generic drugs which have the same efficacy.

In the 1960s and 1970s Chile attempted to introduce a rational policy, based on a limited number of essential drugs. The Chilean pharmaceutical policy failed due to pressure from the pharmaceutical industry. In the 1970s Sri Lanka demonstrated that a state buying agency linked to a national formulary was a viable and powerful instrument for reducing drug costs without compromising quality, for saving foreign exchange, for rationalising drug usage and for supplying essential drugs at reasonable prices to the whole community. This was made possible by the formulation and implementation of an integrated national pharmaceutical policy.

The Sri Lanka experience became a model for the rest of the world by Prof. Seneka Bibile.

=== Causes of irrational drug use ===
- Irrational prescribing practices of doctors
- Dispensing by pharmacists and drug sellers
- Drug pricing policies and promotional activities of the pharmaceutical industry
- Lack of information, education and communication on rational drug use to providers and consumers
- Lack of effective control and regulatory mechanisms on drug use and
- Lack of political will and leadership to promote rational use.

== Centralised buying agency ==
Under an integrated national pharmaceutical policy, the central buying agency channels all imports and production of pharmaceuticals, calling for worldwide bulk tenders which are limited to the approved drugs listed in the national formulary. The public and private health sectors must obtain all their requirements from the central buying agency.

In Chile in 1971, the government of Dr Salvador Allende organised centralised bulk procurement and the first international tender for raw materials was called. However, the pharmaceutical industry struck back and, in the three months following the call for tender, widely used drugs disappeared from the market, including analgesics and antibiotics. The manufacturers had cut their production. They agreed to replenish the market within one week only if the international tenders were called off. In 1972, the government was forced to succumb and called off the tenders.

In Sri Lanka the Sri Lanka State Pharmaceuticals Corporation (SPC) was established in 1972 with Bibile as Chairman. Hence the stranglehold of the multinational corporations on the drug trade was successfully broken and they were made to compete with each other and with generic drug producers, enabling the country to obtain drugs much cheaper. Branded drugs were replaced by generic drugs in the prescription and sale of medicines.

In 1972 it imported 52 drugs at a third of their previous prices. In 1973, the SPC itself bought the raw material necessary for 14 private processing laboratories established in the island. Some drug prices dropped by half or two-thirds. The SPC bought from an Indian company the raw material necessary for a widely used tranquilliser at a much lower price than that charged by a Swiss multinational.

== Drug information ==
It is essential that correct information drugs and therapeutics be given to all medical personnel. The promotional material provided by the drugs manufacturers tends to be distorted in favour of their own products and adds to the costs of supplying drugs.

In Sri Lanka, drug information was provided from official sources. The Prescriber, a quarterly publication edited by the NFC, was published by the SPC and distributed to all medical personnel. The extravagant promotional practices of drugs manufacturers were stopped to remove the dangers and costs inherent in process.

== International experience ==
The Sri Lankan policy was supported by World Health Organization (WHO) and other United Nations agencies with enormous benefit to Third World countries. The United Nations Conference on Trade and Development Secretariat examined the Sri Lankan experience, concluding that an analysis of the Sri Lankan model could give other developing countries an insight into ways of formulating, developing and implementing integrated national pharmaceutical policies. With Bibile's assistance, it published "Case Studies in the Transfer of Technology: Pharmaceutical Policies in Sri Lanka". This document has proved to be a very valuable guideline for developing countries intending to initiate pharmaceutical reforms. Translated into other languages, it may be found with health planners of almost every Third World country.

The "Guide to Good Prescribing" has been translated into 18 languages and adopted by teaching institutions throughout the world.

The WHO took Sri Lanka's experience to the rest of the world, with the result that by 2000:

- over 100 countries had national pharmaceuticals policies,
- 156 countries had national or provincial essential medicines lists
- 135 countries had national treatment guidelines/formulary manuals
- 88 countries had introduced the essential drug concept into medical and pharmacy curricula.

Bangladesh is a least developed country which has confirmed and reiterated that it is within the capabilities countries with limited resources to successfully introduce an integrated national pharmaceutical policy.

The Chilean experience showed the power of the pharmaceuticals giants. The successful implementation of pharmaceutical reforms in Sri Lanka and Bangladesh was due to the presence of the vital ingredient of political will with which real progress is possible.

== See also ==
- International Conference on Harmonisation of Technical Requirements for Registration of Pharmaceuticals for Human Use
- Pharmaceutical policy
- Medicare Part D
- Medicare Prescription Drug, Improvement, and Modernization Act
- National Medicinal Drugs Policy
- Pharmaceutical company
- Prescription drug prices in the United States
- Seneka Bibile
- Sri Lanka National Pharmaceuticals Policy
- State Pharmaceuticals Corporation of Sri Lanka
- National Drug Code System
