= Douglas Walatara =

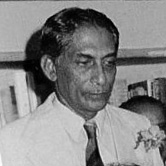
D Walatara

Douglas Walatara (23 October 1920 - 2 February 2011) was a Sri Lankan lecturer in English and had a number of published materials.

Walatara became well known for the "Reconstruction Method" which was a bilingual method that used the student's mother tongue to teach the English language. Some have claimed that this was designed mainly for the benefit of rural children who had difficulty learning English under teachers who themselves “learnt English as a foreign language and for whom English was entirely foreign”.

== Career ==
Sri Lankan Newspaper, the Sunday Times, describes Walatara as having performed with much distinction, the task of educating teachers in the South Asian country. Walatara led a group of educationists who wanted to teach English through the Sinhala language. This group of educationists included Jeanne Hoban (also known as Jeanne Moonesinghe) among others.

Walarara taught at the Sri Lankan Government Training College in Maharagama for over 20 years. Following this, he was a Professor of Education at the University of Colombo, Sri Lanka.

It has been claimed that he renounced a prestigious position as an executive in the Bank of Ceylon to take up a role as a lower paid but more fulfilling, job as a teacher-educator.

== Early years ==
Douglas Walatara was the eldest of three brothers born to an Anglo-Indian mother from Goa, India, and a Sinhalese father from Colombo, Sri Lanka. He attended S. Thomas' College, Mount Lavinia where he excelled in English studies. In the very early 1960s, Walatara lived in England for a year before returning to Sri Lanka.
