= Prevention of the Avoidance of Income Tax Act =

The Prevention of the Avoidance of Income Tax Act (No 26 of 1970), was an act passed in the Parliament of Ceylon in on 26 October 1970 that demonetized all currency notes in circulation in the island at the time with the denominations of Rupees 50 and 100. With all high value currency notes bearing a date prior to 26 October 1970, demonetized new Rupees 50 and 100 notes were introduced.

The demonetization was brainchild of the Minister of Finance, Dr N. M. Perera who had the replacement notes printed by Thomas De La Rue instead of its regular printers, to ensure secrecy. The Governor of the Central Bank William Tennekoon was not informed until the notes arrived at the bank. The objective of the demonetization, was to flush out black money, by forcing those holding the high value notes to turn them in before 3 November 1970 and thereby exposing them to the Inland Revenue Department. The demonetization failed to increase government tax revenue, the Central Bank had to bear the cost of the operation and the replacement notes had to be discontinued since they violated election laws by containing the ruling party symbol.

== See also ==
- 2016 Indian banknote demonetisation
