= I. J. Wickrema =

Sri Lankan politician

I.J. Wickrema aka ‘‘Irvin Joseph Wickrema’’ was a promising leader of the Government Clerical Service Union (GCSU) in Sri Lanka in the 1960s. He was a Communist ideologist and a member of Lanka Sama Samaja Party's central committee also led the GCSU's "Golden era" in its history. At that time the total number of GCSU members was around 30,000 out of 50,000 clerical workers in the 1960s.

== Early life ==
He was born in 1922 in Galle, Southern Sri Lanka and spent his childhood there.

== Trade union work ==
He was well-read about Communism and in his speeches he explained how to use Communist ideology within the trade union struggle. He organised branch committees of the union throughout the country.

He was elected secretary of the union and later became president. During the years from 1965 to 1970, many incidents happened in Sri Lanka's politics and the union reacted to the changes by taking the side of the worker.

He introduced the death donation scheme and the retirement donation scheme from which its members benefited at a time of grief and in the later years of their lives.

=== Building the headquarters ===
Under I.J. Wickrema's leadership the GCSU started work to build their own headquarters in front of the "Lake House" (the office of the government newspapers). Sri Lanka's celebrated dramatist Henry Jayasena staged dramas to raise funds for the new building. Sri Lanka's former prime minister Mrs.Sirimavo R.D. Bandaranaike laid the foundation stone for the building. Visitors to the city of Colombo can see the GCSU headquarters building near the Beira lake.

=== Leaving the GCSU ===
I.J. Wickrema left the union at the end of 1970 when he was appointed as a CAS officer. The 1977 government of Mrs.Sirimavo Bandaranaike was over and the new United National Party government came into power under the leadership of J.R Jayawardene. He was subjected to political revenge and his close relatives who worked in the public sector were transferred to difficult areas. Finally he was sent to the CAS officers pool and a year later he was retired. He died in late 1979 and his funeral march was organised under the banner of the GCSU.

== See also ==
- GCSU Sri Lanka
- Lanka Sama Samaja Party
