= Welikadawatte =

Housing estate in Sri Lanka

Coordinates: 6.904896°N 79.896768°E

Welikadawatte, a middle-class housing estate in Rajagiriya, Sri Lanka, was a result of the first co-operative housing scheme in Sri Lanka. In the mid-1950s, Seneka Bibile, together with Herbert Keuneman, 'Bonnie' Fernando, Anil and Jeanne Moonesinghe and other members of the radical intelligentsia, founded Sri Lanka's first co-operative housing scheme, the Gothatuwa Building Society. The members of the society were drawn from the ranks of the journalists of the "Lake House" publishing group and of the professors of the University of Ceylon.

The housing estate was established on land granted through the offices of T. B. Ilangaratne in the Welikada area (Rajagiriya postal area) of Kotte, now the capital of Sri Lanka but then a suburb of Colombo. Originally within a large cinnamon and coconut plantation known as Marandaan Kurunduwatte, it was named Welikadawatte – the Sinhala for "Welikada Gardens". One notable aspect of the scheme was that each of the houses had a distinct design, the architects experimenting with forms new to Sri Lanka at the time. Some of the designs were reminiscent of the approach of Walter Gropius and the Bauhaus – then popularly known as the 'American Style'.

The scheme later on expanded considerably, both in size and in population. It attained some fame as an island of intellectual creativity from the mid-1960s onwards.

The offices of the Strømme Foundation, the Humanitarian Information Centre for Sri Lanka Rights, and the English Writers' Co-operative of Sri Lanka are located there.
