= 1970 Ceylonese parliamentary election =

Sri Lankan government elections

- 27 May 1970

151 seats in the House of Representatives of Ceylon 76 seats were needed for a majority
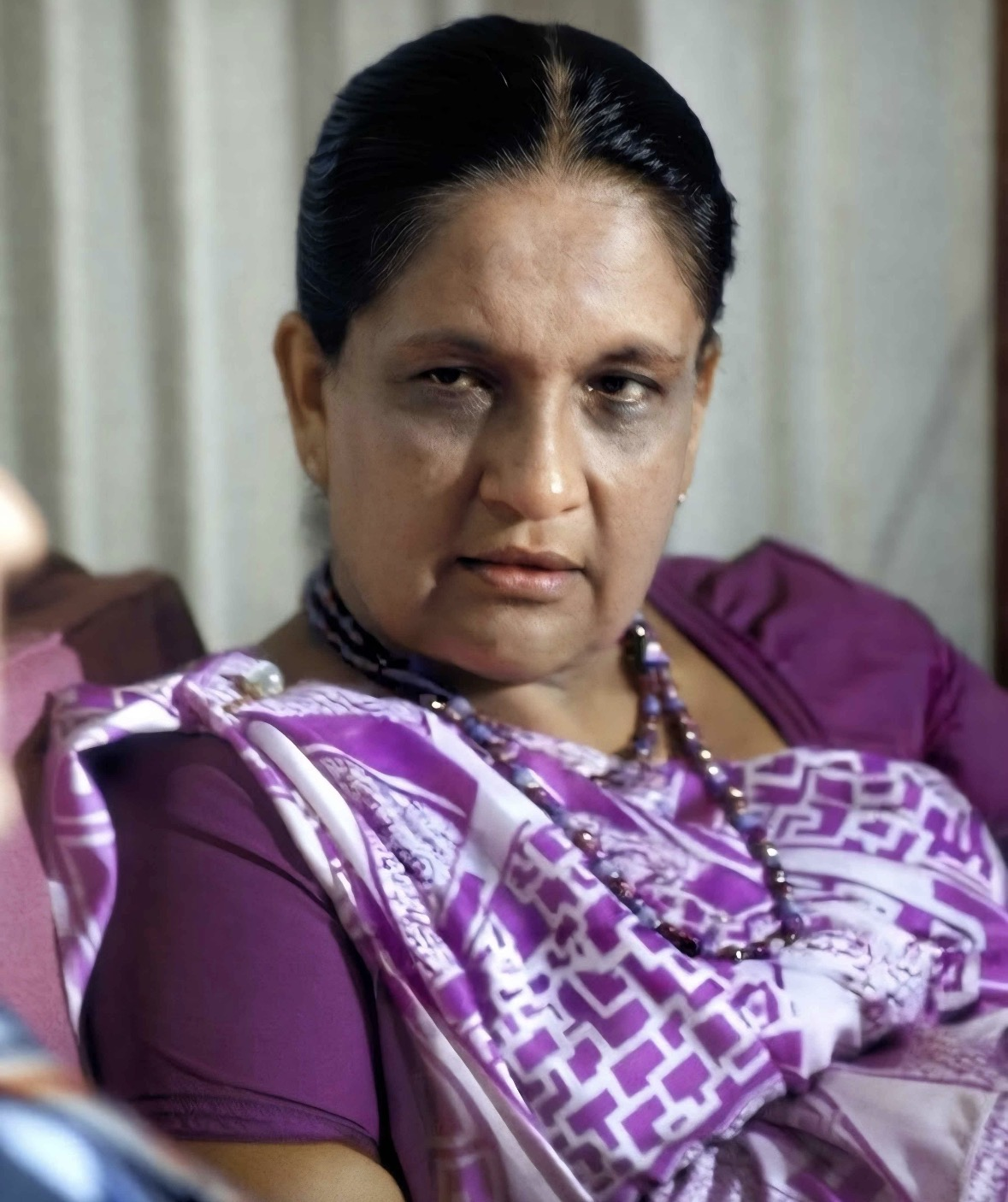

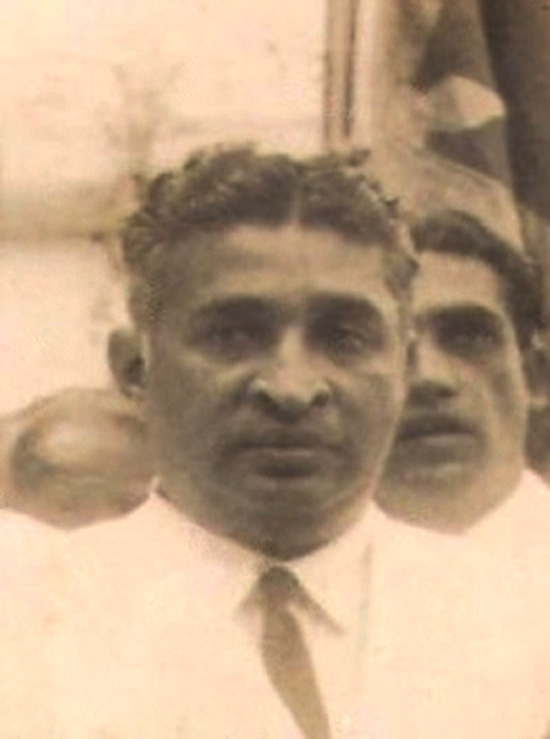
	First party	Second party	Third party
Leader	Sirimavo Bandaranaike	N. M. Perera	Dudley Senanayake
Party	SLFP	LSSP	UNP
Alliance	United Front	United Front	–
Leader since	1960	1945	1957
Leader's seat	Attanagalla	Yatiyantota	Dedigama
Last election	30.18%, 41 seats	7.47%, 10 seats	39.31%, 66 seats
Seats won	91	19	17
Seat change	▲50	▲9	▼49
Popular vote	1,839,979	433,224	1,892,525
Percentage	36.86%	8.68%	37.91%
Swing	▲6.68pp	▲1.21pp	▼1.40pp
Prime Minister before election
Dudley Senanayake
UNP
Prime Minister-designate
Sirimavo Bandaranaike
SLFP

Parliamentary elections were held in Ceylon in 1970.

== Background ==
SLFP leader Sirimavo Bandaranaike had come to the conclusion that her party's best hope of power was forming a permanent alliance with Ceylon's Marxist parties. She assembled the SLFP, the Trotskyist LSSP, and the Communists into the United Front coalition. The UF's platform was called the Common Programme; it featured extensive nationalization, a non-aligned foreign policy, expanded social programmes, and replacement of the British-imposed, monarchical Soulbury constitution with a republican constitution.

The UNP government of Dudley Senanayake had not made much headway with Ceylon's twin problems of inflation and unemployment, nor had it attempted solving the linked problems of feudal property relations and adverse terms of trade by agrarian reform and industrialisation. The UNP had become widely perceived as a party of the rich, out of touch with the concerns of ordinary people. The UF's socialist platform had much greater appeal.

== Results ==
The UF (with 49% of the vote) won an overwhelming majority, despite the UNP's plurality of the popular vote, due to the member parties running in different constituencies. The Tamil majority constituencies voted mainly for the two Tamil parties, one of which (the All Ceylon Tamil Congress), later joined the UF.

The 1970 election was the last held under the Soulbury constitution. The UF Government established the free, sovereign and independent Republic of Sri Lanka in 1972, breaking the last ties of colonialism.

The British-owned plantations were nationalised and there was land reform – giving poor rural people land. Industrial democracy was instituted in the transport and manufacturing sectors. A National pharmaceuticals policy was established, allowing for affordable drugs. A new education policy was followed, aimed at making education more relevant.

Increased protection led to growth in the manufacturing sector, particularly in textiles and garments, electronics and industrial machinery.

Party	Votes	%	Seats
United National Party	1,892,525	37.91	17
Sri Lanka Freedom Party	1,839,979	36.86	91
Lanka Sama Samaja Party	433,224	8.68	19
Illankai Tamil Arasu Kachchi	245,727	4.92	13
Communist Party of Ceylon	169,199	3.39	6
All Ceylon Tamil Congress	115,567	2.32	3
Mahajana Eksath Peramuna	46,571	0.93	0
Independents	249,006	4.99	2
Total	4,991,798	100.00	151
Registered voters/turnout	5,505,028	–	
Source: Kusaka Research Institute
