= GCSU Sri Lanka =

GCSU
- Government Clerical Service Union
- Location: Sri Lanka

The Government Clerical Service Union (GCSU) is a trade union of clerical workers who work in the public sector in Sri Lanka. This was formed in the 1920s when Sri Lanka (Ceylon) was under British colonial rule. It is a politically independent trade union but the majority of the activists were Communists early in its history.

== History ==
=== British colonial era ===
British colonialists who ruled Sri Lanka (Ceylon) from March 1815 educated the Sri Lankan people to work in the public sector because it was very difficult to bring sufficient administrative staff from the UK to administer the colony.

The schools formed by Christian missionaries taught the English language to the students who were later employed in the public sector because of their knowledge of the English language. After 1815, the British colonial rulers started educating Sri Lanka's public workers about the administration rules and regulations. They also held examinations for the clerical workers to upgrade their working level. The famous manual among the public sector workers named Administration Rules and Regulations (ARR) is still used in Sri Lanka. An examination was held for the administration officers called the Ceylon Administrative Service (CAS) exam. After passing it they were graded as CAS officers.

=== Before 1948 ===
In the 1920s the clerical workers of Sri Lanka formed a union to protect their workers rights.

From beginning of the GCSU in February 1920 to the political independence of Sri Lanka in 1948 it has to struggle with British rulers in order to secure workers' rights and national independence.

=== From 1948 to 1977 ===
After the political independence from British colonial rulers in February 1948 the GCSU became a more powerful force in Sri Lanka. Most of the GCSU members were members of Lanka Sama Samaja Party (LSSP) and Communist Party of Sri Lanka (CP-Moscow wing). Dr. N.M. Perera the leader of LSSP was openly supporting the activities of the GCSU by protecting workers' rights.

=== After 1977 ===
After the year 1977, the situation for Sri Lanka's left-wing political movements was getting worse due to the former President of Sri Lanka Junius Richard Jayawardena's (J.R. Jayawardena), right-wing policies. But the GCSU still remained as a force among public-sector workers.

== Role of I.J. Wickrema ==
=== Most powerful union ===
I. J. Wickrema was a promising leader of the GCSU in the 1960s. He led the GCSU during the "Golden era" in its history. The total number of members was around 30,000 out of 50,000 clerical workers in Sri Lanka in the 1960s. He organised branch committees of the union throughout the country, giving more strength to it. He was elected as secretary of the union and later became its President. During his period in office (1965–70), many incidents happened in Sri Lanka's politics and they reacted to the changes by taking the side of the worker. Anyone can refer to their official news paper "Red Tape" and get an idea of how they reacted to the changing political situation of the country.

He introduced the Death donation scheme and the Retirement donation scheme from which its members benefited at a time of grief and in the later years of their lives.

=== Building the headquarters ===
Under I.J. Wickrema's leadership the GCSU started work to build their own headquarters in front of the "Lake House" (the office of the government news papers). Famous Sri Lanka's drama player Henry Jayasena staged dramas to raise funds for the new building. Former Sri Lanka's Prime Minister Mrs.Sirimavo R.D. Bandaranaike laid the foundation stone for the building. Any one who visits the city of Colombo can see the GCSU headquarters building near the Beira lake.

=== Leaving the GCSU ===
I.J. Wickrema left the union at the end of 1970 as he was appointed as a CAS officer. The 1977 government of Mrs.Sirimavo was over and the new United National Party government came into power under the leadership of Junius Richard Jayawardena. He was subjected to political revenge and his close relatives worked in the public sector were transferred to difficult areas. Finally he was sent to the CAS officers pool giving him mental agony and a year later he was retired. He died in late 1979 and his funeral march was organised under the banner of the GCSU.

== GCSU martyrs ==
In June 1947 V. Kandasamy a Tamil national, became victim to the atrocities of the British colonial rulers and sacrificed his young life to the bullet, on their way to Kolonnawa after a general strike meeting at Hyde Park Colombo.

In May 1989 M.K. Meththananda was shot by insurgents when he was at home in Tangalle, a village of deep south. He supported Provincial Councils, which were formed after the Indo-Lanka Peace Accord signed in July 1987.

== See also ==
- Lanka Sama Samaja Party
- I. J. Wickrema
- Communist Party of Sri Lanka
