= Janadina =

Janadina ජනදින
- Type: Daily
- Political alignment: Trotskyist
- Language: Sinhala
- Headquarters: Colombo
- Circulation: 20–30,000 (late 1960s)

Janadina (Sinhala: ජනදින, 'People's Daily') was a Sinhala-language daily newspaper published in Sri Lanka. It was an organ of the Lanka Sama Samaja Party (LSSP).

In the latter half of the 1960s, Janadina gained recognition (along with the Communist Party organ Aththa) for carrying fierce criticisms of the government, using novel forms of journalism and catchy headlines. The newspaper had some 20–30,000 daily readers. In response to its anti-government postures during this period, the Janadina was blocked from being transported on government buses and government agencies would not buy advertisements in it. Janadina was banned from time to time under emergency regulations.
