= National Medicinal Drugs Policy =

The National Medicinal Drugs Policy is an essential part of Sri Lanka's Health Policy, aimed at the rational use of pharmaceuticals.

By the beginning of the 21st Century, Sri Lanka had approximately 9,000 registered medicinal drugs, hundreds of which were non-essential, unnecessary, highly expensive or even dangerous. In 1996 the Government of President Chandrika Kumaratunga had established a new health policy, one stated aim of which was to develop and implement a National Drug Policy for the rational use and distribution of drugs. While this policy continues to this day, no concrete measures had been adopted for its implementation.

In 2005 the United People's Freedom Alliance Government promised to establish a National Medicinal Drugs Policy (NMPD) that would enable Sri Lankans significantly to cut down on drug expenses and get quality drugs at affordable prices while saving billions of Rupees in foreign exchange for the country. It anticipated that the implementation of the NMDP could reduce the number of drugs imported, prescribed and sold in Sri Lanka to about 350 varieties.

Consultations were held with all stakeholders, presided over by Prof. Krisantha Weerasuriya, the World Health Organization (WHO) Regional Advisor, Essential Medicines over four days in June 2005, and the draft for the NMDP was prepared. In October, the Minister of Health obtained cabinet approval for the draft NMDP and promised that the appropriate legislation would be introduced in parliament.

In February 2006 the Health Ministry called another meeting of all stakeholders and the Minister gave assurances that the NMDP would be implemented within weeks. An eighteen-member National Standing Committee (NSC), including a representative of the People's Movement for the Rights of Patients, was appointed in March to oversee and expedite the implementation of the Drug Policy based on the Seneka Bibile principles of rational drug use. The NSC was advised by the Legal Draftsman that new legislation should be drafted for the establishment of the NMDA.

During 2007, popular pressure for the implementation of the NMPD grew. In October, the Cabinet approved to a Memorandum submitted by Healthcare and Nutrition Minister Nimal Siripala de Silva on the establishment of the National Medicinal Drug Authority (NMDA) and granted its approval to draft a new Act with the assistance of the Legal Draftsman to expedite the implementation of the NMPD by repealing or amending the existing Cosmetics Devices and Drugs Act where necessary.

Although the scene was created to establish the Authority, it did not take place due to the civil war in the North of the country. The stalemate of Drugs being regulated by the Ministry bureaucrats continued.

From 2010 to late 2014, Mr Maithripala Sirisena was the Minister of Health and strongly supported the establishment of the Authority but there was no support from the President, Mr Mahinda Rajapakse. At the end of 2014, Mr Sirisena challenged Mr Rajapaksa at the Presidential Elections and won. Implementing the National Medicines Policy and within it the National Medicines Regulatory Authority was a part of the 100 day plan of President Sirisena. The Act to establish the Authority was finally passed in early 2015.

Finally in mid 2015, an independent Medicines Regulatory Authority was established in Sri Lanka.

There is an interesting discussion on regulating Medicines Prices by the NMRA (July 2020) in e-drug. This does show it is possible to regulate prices of medicines and the industry/trade despite protesting will remain in the market as they can get a reasonable Return on the Investment.
