= Ceylon Mercantile Union =

The Ceylon Mercantile Union (CMU) is one of the largest trade unions in the commercial sector in Sri Lanka.

The Ceylon Mercantile, Industrial and General Workers Union was originally established in 1928 as a white-collar union in the mercantile sector. Victor Corea and A.E. Goonesinha were respectively the inaugural President and secretary of the CMU.

After Bala Tampoe became its general secretary in February 1948, it came under the influence of the Lanka Sama Samaja Party.

In 1961, the CMU signed a collective agreement with the Employers' Federation of Ceylon, which was revised in 1967. It was Ceylon's first major collective agreement and the most comprehensive at that time. The revision in 1967, which took two years of negotiations, included the first ever provisions for dues check-off in the private sector.
