= State Pharmaceuticals Corporation of Sri Lanka =

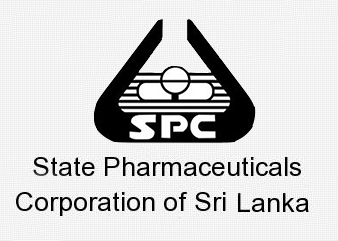
- SPC's current corporate logo
- Abbreviation: SPC
- Formation: March 1971; 55 years ago
- Legal status: Corporation body
- Headquarters: Colombo, Sri Lanka
- Chairman: Manuj C Weerasinghe
- Website: www.spc.lk/index.php

The State Pharmaceuticals Corporation (SPC) is a state-owned enterprise with its headquarters in Colombo, Sri Lanka. It is the largest supplier of drugs in the country, and is tasked with providing quality-assured health care items that are safe and effective, at an affordable price, while educating the public on the rational use of drugs. It employees about 600 staff.

== History ==
The SPC was established in 1971 under the State Industrial Corporations Act Number 49 of 1957, as a result of the Report in March of that year of the Bibile – Wickramasinghe commission, appointed by the then Prime Minister Sirimavo Bandaranaike. Its founder chairman was Professor Seneka Bibile.

The SPC channelled all imports and production of pharmaceuticals, calling for worldwide bulk tenders which were limited to the approved drugs listed in the National Formulary. The public and private health sectors had to obtain all their requirements from the SPC. Hence the stranglehold of the Multinational corporations on the drug trade was successfully broken and they were made to compete with each other and with generic drug producers, enabling the country to obtain drugs much cheaper. Branded drugs were replaced by generic drugs in the prescription and sale of medicines.

In 1972 the SPC imported 52 drugs at a third of their previous prices. In 1973, the SPC itself bought the raw material necessary for 14 private processing laboratories established in the island. Some drug prices dropped by half or two-thirds. The SPC bought from an Indian company the raw material necessary for a widely used tranquilliser at a much lower price than that charged by a Swiss multinational.

The Prescriber, a quarterly publication edited by the National Formulary Committee, was published by the SPC and distributed to all medical personnel. The extravagant promotional practices of drugs manufacturers were stopped to remove the dangers and costs inherent in process.

With the election of the Multi-National-friendly United National Party Government of 1977, the SPC was called upon to compete with the private sector. There was continued government control of the types of drugs imported, but permission was given to the private sector to import multiple brands. The SPC was never dissolved and continued to supply affordable drugs, continuing to be responsible for centralised procurement for the government health sector.

== Sales network ==
The SPC the sole supplier of pharmaceuticals, surgical consumable items, laboratory chemicals and equipment to all institutions administered by the Ministry of Health. At the same time it is the largest supplier to the private sector, with a 30% market share. The retail outlets of the SPC are called Rajya Osu Salas (state drug shops), of which there are 18. In addition, there are 36 Franchise Osu Salas 48 Distributors and 20 Authorized Retailers spread throughout the country.

The original Rajya Osu Sala in Colombo 7 operates 24 hours a day and 365 days a year.

== Products ==
The SPC provides about 2000 drugs, covering a wide spectrum of pharmacological activity, at some of the lowest prices in the world.

- Jeevanee, a life-saving Oral Rehydration, based on a formula approved by the WHO and UNICEF.
- SPC Glucose

== Quality assurance ==
All pharmaceuticals supplied by the SPC are subject to quality testing by the Quality Assurance Laboratory at the Head Office.

== Information services ==
It is essential that correct information on drugs and therapeutics be given to all medical personnel and also to the general public.

- The Sri Lanka Prescriber, providing information on pharmaceuticals, therapeutics and medicines for professionals and researchers continues to be published quarterly.
- Radio and TV Programmes through which the general public are given an opportunity to get their health related problems discussed by top specialists in the field, are conducted weekly both in Sinhala and Tamil language.
- Newspaper Articles on Public health and the rational use of drugs, facilities available for general public from the SPC and on the importance of using generic names of pharmaceuticals.
- Leaflets, Brochures and Handbills are distributed among the general public on special occasions such as exhibitions, seminara and awareness programmes, providing information about the products and services of the SPC.
- School Science Day Programmes for rural students who have limited facilities, in collaboration with the Sri Lanka Association for the Advancement of Science.
