= N. M. Perera =

Sri Lankan politician

Hon. N. M. Perera
- එන්. එම්. පෙරේරා
- Perera in 1961

1st Leader of the Opposition
- In office 19 April 1956 – 5 December 1959
- Prime Minister: S. W. R. D. Bandaranaike
- Preceded by: S. W. R. D. Bandaranaike
- Succeeded by: C. P. de Silva
- In office 14 October 1947 – 8 April 1952
- Prime Minister: D. S. Senanayake; Dudley Senanayake
- Succeeded by: S. W. R. D. Bandaranaike

Minister of Finance
- In office 10 May 1970 – 2 September 1975
- Prime Minister: Sirimavo Bandaranaike
- Preceded by: U. B. Wanninayake
- Succeeded by: Felix Dias Bandaranaike
- In office 11 June 1964 – 17 December 1964
- Prime Minister: Sirimavo Bandaranaike
- Preceded by: T. B. Ilangaratne
- Succeeded by: U. B. Wanninayake

Mayor of Colombo
- In office 13 August 1954 – 28 February 1956
- Preceded by: T. Rudra
- Succeeded by: V. A. Sugathadasa

Member of the Ceylon Parliament for Yatiyantota
- In office 1960–1977
- Preceded by: seat created
- Succeeded by: K. Vincent Perera

Member of the Ceylon Parliament for Ruwanwella
- In office September 1947 – 1960
- Preceded by: seat created
- Succeeded by: H. G. Somabandu

Personal details
- Born: 6 June 1904 Colombo, Sri Lanka
- Died: 14 August 1979 (aged 75) Colombo, Sri Lanka
- Party: Lanka Sama Samaja Party
- Spouse: Selina Perera
- Education: London School of Economics, University College, Colombo
- Occupation: Politician, Trade Unionist

Nanayakkarapathirage Martin Perera, commonly known as Dr. N. M. Perera (Sinhala එන්.එම්.පෙරේරා [en em pe reaira]; 6 June 1904 – 14 August 1979), was one of the leaders of the Sri Lankan Trotskyist Lanka Sama Samaja Party (LSSP). He was the first Trotskyist to become a cabinet minister. He served two terms as Minister of Finance, another two as Leader of the Opposition, as well as one term as the Mayor of Colombo.

== Early life and family ==
Born to Nanayakkarapathirage Abraham Perera, a rent collector at 36 St Joseph's Street, in Grandpass, Colombo, and Johana Perera. He was the fifth of nine siblings, including five boys and four girls.

== Education ==
=== Schooling ===
Perera started his schooling in the vernacular section of St. Joseph's School, Grandpass and was later admitted to the English section. From there he spent a year at the Cathedral Boys' School, Mutwal a branch school of S. Thomas' College, Mutwal, then known as Cathedral Boys School, Mutwal. In 1919, he entered S. Thomas' College, Mount Lavinia and left in 1922 to join Ananda College. At Ananda he played cricket for the college team.

=== Higher studies ===
Perera entered the University College, Colombo in 1925 and passed the inter Arts in 1926. He then switched to inter Economics in 1927 and left to join the London School of Economics (LSE) on 10 October 1927.

He studied at the LSE from 1927 to 1933, having been admitted in October 1927 to complete a BSc in Economics, before starting his PhD studies in 1929 under Professor Harold Laski, who taught political and constitutional theory, along with Leslie Goonewardene. Perera travelled to France and Germany to conduct research at the libraries of Sciences Po and the Reichstag. His return in 1930 was delayed by the Auflösung des Reichstags. His attempts to travel to the United States was not successful as funding fell through. Following the Wall Street crash of 1929 and resulting trade depression in Ceylon, his father was no longer able to support him. With no financial assistance, he limited the scope of his research and presented his theses on the Constitution of the German Weimar Republic and was awarded his PhD in 1932 and soon after he applied to start on the DSc (Econ) with Professor Laski has his supervisor and in 1932 became the first Ceylonese to gain a DSc degree from the University of London.

[Something amiss here. A higher doctorate is not a supervised degree. Itw usually takes 10 years of work after the PhD. Please check. It seems he got two PhD degrees, not a PhD and a DSc. Do you have the certicates?

Erbear]

== Social service and early politics ==
=== Suriya-Mal Movement ===
On his return to Ceylon in 1933, Perera with several other foreign educated youth, such as Leslie Gunawardena, S.A. Wickramasinghe, Dr Colvin R. De Silva, Vernon Gunasekara, B.J. Fernando, Doreen Wickramasinghe, and Selena Perera (is future wife) formed the Suriya-Mal Movement as an anti-imperialist counter movement to the Remembrance poppy sales.

With the outbreak malaria epidemic in 1934, the Suriya Mal Society pivoted from selling Sunflowers to rais funds for ex-servicemen to setting up makeshift field hospitals, soup kitchens, and care centers areas worst effected by the epidemic. The volunteer work done by the Perera as part of the Suriya Mal Society in the Kegalle district during the and during the subsequent floods gained for him the support of the poor and caste-oppressed people of the area, who called him Parippu Mahathmaya after the dhal (or parippu) he distributed as relief supplies.

=== Formation of the Lanka Sama Samaja Party ===
Many of the Marxists who has come together to form the Suriya Mal Society, formed the first political part in the island on 18 December 1935 called the Lanka Sama Samaja Party. Perera along with Leslie Goonewardene, Colvin R. de Silva, Philip Gunawardena and Robert Gunawardena were the core group of founders and played a leading role in the party's Trotskyist activities between 1936 and 1940.

== State Council of Ceylon ==
In 1936, he contested the Ruwanwella constituency in the Kegalle District – which at the time comprised the Thun Korale areas of Yatiyantota, Ruwanwella, and Deraniyagala, along with parts of the present Galigamuwa electoral division – as a candidate of the LSSP in the 1936 Ceylonese State Council election. His opponent was the incumbent Molamure Kumarihamy of the Meedeniya Walauwa, the feudal manor which had tremendous power over the poor people of the Sabaragamuwa area at the time. He went on to hold this seat, or its Yatiyantota portion after the division of the constituency, continuously until 1977. Following his election, he and Philip Gunawardena, the other LSSP member of the State Council, used it as a platform to voice the party's policy and objectives for complete independence from Britain, in contrast to the Ceylon National Congresswhich advocated for self-rule.In 1937, he founded the Ratmalana Railway Workers' Union and served as the LSSP delegate to that year's session of the Indian National Congress.

== Anti-war activity and imprisonment ==
With the outbreak of World War II, the Board of Ministers declared its support to the British government. The LSSP opposed the move, claiming that it was an imperialist war and organized protest. In 1939, Perera formed the All-Ceylon Estate Workers' Union and lead a militant strike at Mooloya Plantation in January 1940. Perera and Gunawardana voted against the war budget in the State Council. Following complaints from plantation owners, the Governor of Ceylon declared LSSP activities against the war effort to be subversive and order the police to arrest the leaders of the LSSP. On 18 June 1940, N.M. Perera, Philip Gunawardena, and Colvin R. de Silva were arrested by the police with Edmund Samarakkody being arrested the following day, but Leslie Goonewardene evaded arrest. The LSSP called for a gathering to protest the arrest and carried out a protest march which was dispersed by the police with a baton charge followed by further arrests. LSSP leaders were detained at Welikada Prison but was later transferred to Bogambara Prison after it was suspected that they were planning a hunger strike. On 5 April 1942 during the Easter Sunday Raid, Perera along with several other imprisoned LSSP members escaped from prison. He was smuggled into Bombay in July 1942 and worked with the Bolshevik-Leninist Party of India, Ceylon and Burma (BLPI) in the Indian Independence Movement. He was arrested in Bombay in July 1943, deported to Ceylon, and sentenced by the Magistrate's Court of Kandy to six months of rigorous imprisonment for escaping custody. He was held in Badulla for the remainder of the war and was released in 1945.

== Leader of the LSSP ==
During the war, the LSSP experienced several internal divisions. The first occurred in 1940 with the split of the pro-Moscow faction led by S. A. Wickremasinghe, M. G. Mendis, Pieter Keuneman, and A. Vaidialingam. This was followed by a second split over the opposition of N. M. Perera and Philip Gunawardena to the proposed merger with the Bolshevik-Leninist Party of India, Ceylon and Burma, which led to the formation of the Workers' Opposition. After the war, this faction rebuilt the LSSP as an independent political party, with N. M. Perera emerging as its leader.

=== Trade union activities ===
Perera served as president of All Ceylon United Motor Workers' Union, and United Corporations and Mercantile Union of the Ceylon Federation of Labour (CFL). During the 1946 general strike, the striking workers appointed him as their chief negotiator. .

== Leader of the opposition (1947–1952) ==
Having lost their seats in the State Council due to their imprisonment, the LSSP contested the 1947 general elections under the new constitution. N. M. Perera was elected from Ruwanwella and the LSSP gained the 28 seats in parliament, becoming the second largest representation, making Perera the Leader of the Opposition. He opposed the Ceylon Citizenship Act. On reunification with the Bolshevik Samasamaja Party (BSSP), he remained with the LSSP when the Viplavakari Lanka Sama Samaja Party (VLSSP) split off under Philip Gunawardena. He served as opposition leader until fresh elections were called in 1952. In the 1952 general elections, he was re-elected, but the LSSP became the second largest party in the opposition and S. W. R. D. Bandaranaike became the opposition leader.

== Mayor of Colombo ==
In 1954, the LSSP won a string of local government elections which included nine Village Councils and three Urban Councils and the Colombo Municipal Council, where N. M. Perera was elected Mayor of Colombo, only non-United National Party-politician to win that office after 1945. He was Mayor for two years, before he was voted out of office on 28 February 1956 by the United National Party with the support of Ranasinghe Premadasa of the Ceylon Labour Party.

== Leader of the opposition (1956–1959) ==
N. M. Perera contested the 1956 general elections, where the Sri Lanka Freedom Party of the Bandaranaike gained landslide victory over the United National Party which was reduced to eight seats in parliament. Once again N. M. Perera was elected leader of the opposition in parliament, a post he held until 1959. He was a strong opponent of the Official Language Act, and narrowly escaped death when a bomb was thrown on stage when he was addressing a crowd at the Old Town Hall.

== Split in the party ==
He was re-elected in the 1960 March general election and the 1960 July general election from Yatiyantota and sat in the opposition. When LSSP was divided over possible government participation in the early 1960s, Perera was the principal leader of the wing that wanted to enter into government with the Sri Lanka Freedom Party, which led to LSSP's expulsion from the Fourth International in 1964.

== Minister of Finance (1964 and 1970) ==
A short lived coalition government was formed in 1964 known as the United Front and Perera was appointed Minister of Finance in it. He had to step down as minister when the United Front was defeated in the 1965 general elections and sat in the opposition having retained his seat in parliament.

He was reappointed as Minister of Finance in 1970, when the United Front won the 1970 general elections. He served as Minister of Finance from 10 May 1970 to 2 September 1975. Facing a substantial budget deficit, Perera first attempted to increase government revenue through taxation. In October 1970, he initiated the demonetization of the 50- and 100-Rupee notes in an effort to flush out black money. The measure, however, failed to generate significant additional revenue and imposed considerable operational costs on the Central Bank. The 1971 Janatha Vimukthi Peramuna (JVP) Insurrection took the leftist government by surprise and threatened to topple it. In the aftermath, Perera advanced a program of nationalizing private property and industries. These measures, however, discouraged both domestic and foreign investment, while unemployment and inflation remained unresolved. By 1974, the budget deficit had reached $195 million, and Ceylon was facing a severe foreign exchange crisis. This situation was partly due to global economic pressures such as the 1973 oil crisis and partly the result of domestic policies – including the Bandaranaike government's efforts to centralize the economy and enforce price controls – which contributed to declining revenues from coconut, rubber, and tea exports, as well as increased food-importation costs. In September 1975, N. M. Perera and other LSSP ministers were dismissed by Prime Minister Sirima Bandaranaike. In the 1977 general elections, which the United National Party won with a landslide of 5/6 of the seats, the LSSP, along with other leftist parties, suffered a complete defeat and lost all parliamentary representation. Perera himself lost his long-held Yatiyantota seat.

== Later years ==
From 1977 to 1978, he served as Chairman of the Board of Control of Cricket in Sri Lanka, and worked hard to obtain test status for Sri Lanka. In 1978, he represented Sri Lanka at the United Nations Conference on Trade and Development as an adviser. He died on 14 August 1979 at the Colombo National Hospital following gall-bladder complication, aged 75 and his funeral gathered large crowds.

== Personal life ==
He married fellow LSSP founding member and later party secretary, Selina Margaret Peiris on 6 March 1936. N. M. Perera was an avid cricket fan and a keen tennis player.

== Publications ==
- Parliamentary Democracy (1931)
- The Case for Free Education (1944)
- External Economic Assistance (1964)
- The Economy of Ceylon: Trends and Prospects (1971)
- Critical Analysis of the New Constitution of the Sri Lanka Government (1979)

== See also ==
- Lanka Sama Samaja Party
- GCSU Sri Lanka
