= Senaka Bibile =

Sri Lankan pharmacologist and medical education pioneer (1920–1977)

- සේනක බිබිලේ
- A 2009 commemorative postage stamp issued by Sri Lanka Post
- Born: Senaka William Bibile; 13 February 1920; Kataluwa Walawwa, Kataluwa, Ahangama, Galle, Sri Lanka
- Died: 29 September 1977 (aged 57); Guyana
- Education: Trinity College, Kandy; Medical College, Colombo; University of Edinburgh
- Known for: Founder of the Sri Lanka National Pharmaceuticals Policy and State Pharmaceuticals Corporation of Sri Lanka
- Spouse: Leela Bibile
- Awards: Djunjishaw Dadabhoy Gold Medal in Medicine, Rockwood Gold Medal in Surgery

Senaka Bibile (Sinhala: සේනක බිබිලේ; 13 February 1920 – 29 September 1977) was a Sri Lankan pharmacologist, academic, and medical education pioneer. He was the founder of the Sri Lanka National Pharmaceuticals Policy, which became a global model for rational pharmaceutical policies, adopted by the World Health Organization (WHO), the United Nations Conference on Trade and Development (UNCTAD), and the Non-Aligned Movement. He also established the State Pharmaceuticals Corporation of Sri Lanka (SPC) to regulate drug imports and reduce costs. As Dean of the Faculty of Medicine, University of Peradeniya, he pioneered medical education reforms, establishing Sri Lanka’s first Medical Education Unit (MEU). Bibile is widely regarded as one of Sri Lanka’s greatest medical benefactors due to his contributions to affordable healthcare and medical education.

== Early life and education ==
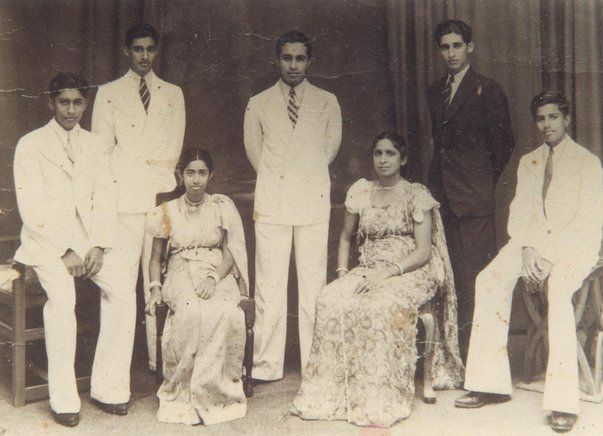
Bibile family. Left to right: Charles William Bibile (father), Sylvester Chandra Bibile, Sujatha Doris Ranawana (Nee Bibile), Senaka William Bibile, Sylvia Jayawardena Bibile (mother), Henry Ananda Bibile, Cuda Banda Bibile.

Senaka Bibile was born on 13 February 1920 at Kataluwa Walawwa in Ahangama, Galle, Sri Lanka, to an aristocratic family.

His father, Charles William Bibile, was a Rate Mahatmaya or Chief Native Feudal Official of Wellassa, his mother Sylvia Jayawardena of Kataluwa Walauwa, the manor house of the Obeyesekere - Jayawardena family. The Bibile family claimed descent from a 16th-century Vedda chieftain.

Bibile received his primary and secondary education at Trinity College, Kandy. At Trinity College, Bibile excelled academically, winning prizes in science and biology, and in extracurriculars, earning rugby colours and starring in school dramas. He was a prefect and a cadet, demonstrating early signs of leadership material. Financial difficulties after his father's death were mitigated by a philanthropist's support, enabling him to continue his education. Bibile's early exposure to rural poverty, through visits with his father to remote villages and volunteer work with Trinity College's Social Service Union in Mahaiyawa slums, shaped his commitment to social justice and healthcare equity.

He entered the Medical College, Colombo, graduating in 1945 with a first-class honours MBBS degree, securing the Djunjishaw Dadabhoy Gold Medal in Medicine and Rockwood Gold Medal in Surgery. Influenced by Marxist and socialist ideologies, he inspired peers like Carlo Fonseka during his student years.

In 1949, he pursued postgraduate studies at the University of Edinburgh, earning a PhD in pharmacology in 1952 for his thesis on biological assays of cortical hormones.

== Academic career ==
Bibile joined the University of Ceylon in 1947 as a lecturer in pharmacology, leading a research team under Professor Cullumbine, Professor of Physiology, from 1947 to 1949.

After returning from Edinburgh, he became the first Professor of Pharmacology and head of the pharmacology department at the University of Ceylon in 1958. Known for his learner-centered teaching, he abolished compulsory lecture attendance, yet his engaging lectures, delivered without notes, remained popular among students.

From 1967 to 1977, Bibile served as the first Dean of the Faculty of Medicine at the University of Peradeniya, where he introduced significant educational reforms. His academic leadership extended to mentoring future medical educators and fostering a culture of scientific inquiry and social responsibility.

== Medical education contributions ==
As Dean, Bibile pioneered medical education reforms in Sri Lanka, transforming the Faculty of Medicine, Peradeniya, into a hub of innovative teaching. Key contributions include:

- Medical Education Unit (MEU): In 1973, he established Sri Lanka’s first MEU, recognized by the World Health Organization (WHO) as a Regional Teacher Training Centre for South East Asia. It trained educators from countries such as India, Nepal, and Bangladesh. The MEU focused on clinical teaching, objective assessments, and staff development, with trained academics like Dr. Palitha Abeykoon and Prof. P. T. Jayawickramarajah.
- Curriculum reforms: Bibile introduced community-based education, rural field attachments (e.g., Hindagala), and clinical training at peripheral units (e.g., Kadugannawa), predating WHO’s emphasis on community-oriented training. He pioneered the use of Single Best Answer multiple choice questions (MCQs) and supported novel assessments like "Walk-in Practicals" in Physiology.
- Collaborative learning: His "Tuesday Talks" at Peradeniya, based on seminal texts like Teaching and Learning in Medical School by George Miller and Stephen Abrahamson, fostered curriculum development through staff discussions.
- Legacy: Bibile’s reforms inspired the creation of medical education units across Sri Lanka, including the Medical Education Development and Research Centre (MEDARC) at the University of Colombo in 1994. By 2019, Sri Lanka had four professors specializing in medical education, reflecting his enduring impact.

His visionary leadership in medical education not only modernized teaching methods in Sri Lanka but also set a regional benchmark, influencing medical curricula and faculty development across South Asia.

== Pharmaceutical policy ==
Bibile is best known for developing the Sri Lanka National Pharmaceuticals Policy in the 1970s, following the Bibile-Wickremasinghe report, co-authored with Dr S.A. Wickremasinghe and presented to Prime Minister Sirimavo Bandaranaike in 1971.

Senaka Bibile was a fierce critic of multinational pharmaceutical companies, arguing they prioritized profits over people's health by promoting expensive branded drugs, a practice widely believed at the time to involve Pharmaceutical companies in Sri Lanka making considerable money by selling drugs under their trade names and providing biased information against generic drugs. In response, the United Front government of 1970 appointed Dr. S.A. Wickremasinghe and Dr. Bibile to lead a commission of inquiry to investigate these issues, resulting in their recommendation to establish a national policy and a state body to regulate the drug trade.

The policy aimed to ensure affordable access to essential drugs by rationalizing procurement and promoting generic drugs. In 1959, he compiled the Ceylon Hospital Formulary, listing about 630 drugs by their generic names, reducing the number of imported drugs from over 4,000 to 171 by 1972.

The resulting policy had three main pillars:

- Essential Drugs List (EDL): Selection of drugs based on efficacy, safety, need, and cost, reducing imported drugs from over 4,000 to 171 by 1972.
- Generic Name Procurement: Medicines purchased under generic names to eliminate brand-name bias.
- Centralized Procurement: Creation of the State Pharmaceuticals Corporation (SPC) in 1971 to manage imports via global bulk tenders.

In 1971, Bibile was appointed founder chairman of the State Pharmaceuticals Corporation of Sri Lanka (SPC) by Minister T.B. Subasinghe. The SPC centralized drug imports through global bulk tenders, limited to formulary drugs, forcing vendors to compete on cost and ensuring affordable prices for both the public and private health sectors. In its first year, the SPC's centralized drug imports saved Rs. 60 million in foreign exchange. Bibile also chaired the National Formulary Committee, which published Formulary Notes (later The Prescriber) to guide doctors in rational prescribing.

The policy gained international recognition, with WHO and UNCTAD promoting it as a model for developing countries, supported by UN agencies for its enormous benefit to Third World countries. In 1975, WHO and UNCTAD commissioned Bibile to assist other nations, and as a UNCTAD Senior Advisor in 1977, he drafted drug policies for Malaysia, Nepal, Afghanistan, and Caribbean nations, influencing WHO's Essential Medicines Concept. The UNCTAD Secretariat examined the Sri Lankan experience, concluding that it could provide insight for other developing countries in formulating integrated national pharmaceutical policies, and with Bibile's assistance, published Case Studies in the Transfer of Technology: Pharmaceutical Policies in Sri Lanka, a widely translated guideline found among health planners in many Third World countries. Bibile's contributions were acknowledged at the 35th World Health Assembly in Geneva in May 1982.

After Bibile's death, the United National Party government of 1977 relaxed import restrictions, weakening the policy by allowing unrestricted imports, though the SPC continued operations to supply affordable drugs. In 2005, the United People's Freedom Alliance government established the National Medicinal Drugs Policy (NMDP), formalizing Bibile's principles of essential medicines, generic prescribing, and regulatory oversight, with goals to reduce drug expenses, improve quality, save billions of rupees in foreign exchange, and limit drugs to about 350 varieties, though its full implementation faced challenges due to economic constraints.

== Political activities ==
Bibile was a Trotskyist and a member of the Lanka Sama Samaja Party (LSSP), serving as treasurer of its Youth Leagues. He conducted Marxism study classes at his home in Castle Street, Colombo. During the language policy crisis, when the LSSP advocated for both Sinhala and Tamil as state languages, Bibile contested a by-election for the Colombo Municipal Council as an LSSP candidate, despite risks and likely defeat.

In the 1950s, Bibile co-founded Sri Lanka’s first co-operative housing scheme, the Gothatuwa Building Society, with intellectuals like Herbert Keuneman and Anil Moonesinghe. This led to the Welikadawatte housing estate, known for its intellectual community.

== Death ==
Bibile died unexpectedly of a heart attack on 29 September 1977 in Guyana while on a UN assignment to implement his pharmaceutical policies. His remains were cremated in Guyana, and his ashes were interred at Jawatte Cemetery, Sri Lanka, on 8 October 1977.

It is widely believed in Sri Lanka that his death may have been linked to opposition from multinational pharmaceutical companies, with some sources citing a WikiLeaks cable suggesting U.S. interference in his policies, though these claims remain unverified and controversial.

== Legacy ==
Bibile’s legacy endures through the SPC, the National Medicinal Drugs Policy (NMDP), and the annual Senaka Bibile Memorial Oration, organized by the Sri Lanka Medical Association (SLMA) according to some sources, while others report it is held under the auspices of the Kandy Society of Medicine.

His educational reforms inspired generations, notably through the Students Involved in Rational Health Action (SIRHA), founded in 1992 by medical students like Prof. Indika Karunathilake, who became Sri Lanka’s first Professor in Medical Education in 2015. His policies continue to influence Sri Lanka’s healthcare system, with calls to revive the NMDP to address medicine shortages and economic challenges.

== Publications ==
Bibile authored numerous publications, contributing significantly to pharmacology, medical education, and pharmaceutical policy. Notable works include:

- Bibile, S., and Lall, S., The Political Economy of Controlling Transnationals: The Pharmaceutical Industry in Sri Lanka (1972–76), World Development, August 1977.
