= P. B. A. Weerakoon =

Ceylonese educator and politician

Hon. P. B. A. Weerakoon

Member of the Ceylon Parliament for Wattegama
- In office 1956–1960
- Preceded by: Abeyratne Ratnayaka
- Succeeded by: Abeyratne Ratnayaka
- In office 1965–1970
- Preceded by: Abeyratne Ratnayaka
- Succeeded by: A. G. Fernando

Personal details
- Born: 1 January 1900 Punchi Banda Aloysius Weerakoon
- Died: 22 March 1988 (aged 88)
- Party: Sri Lanka Freedom Party (1956-1960); United National Party (1960-1970)
- Spouse: Charlotte née Wijesinghe (m.1936)
- Education: Government Teachers Training College
- Occupation: teacher, politician

Punchi Banda Aloysius Weerakoon (1 January 1900 – 22 March 1988) was a Ceylonese educator and politician.

Aloysius Weerakoon was born on 1 January 1900 the son of S. Weerakoon of Nattarampota. His father died when he was ten and his family moved to Ampitiya, where he was enrolled in an English missionary school. Weerakoon excelled at mathematics and when he turned eighteen, he was invited by the priests to conduct English and mathematics classes for the younger children at the school. In 1919 he entered the Government Teachers Training College in Colombo and graduated as a teacher.

In 1925 he joined the staff at St. Anthony's College, Kandy, where he later became the headmaster of the primary school section.

Weerakoon married Charlotte née Wijesinghe in 1936.

He entered politics in 1943, when he was elected as the representative for the Mawilmada Municipal Ward on the Kandy Municipal Council. He served on the council for thirteen years, during which time he was also elected as the Deputy Mayor of Kandy.

In 1956, he was invited by S. W. R. D. Bandaranaike to contest the seat of Wattegama, on behalf of the Sri Lanka Freedom Party, as part of Bandaranaike's MEP-SLFP coalition. Weerakoon defeated the sitting member, Abeyratne Ratnayaka, by 3,548 votes and was duly appointed as a Member of Parliament.

He was appointed the Parliamentary Secretary to the Minister of Education, Wijeyananda Dahanayake, as part of the S. W. R. D. Bandaranaike cabinet. Following the assassination of Bandaranayke in 1959, which led to Dr. Dahanayake being appointed the caretaker Prime Minister, Dahanayake entrusted Weerakoon with the additional role of Parliamentary Secretary to the Minister of Defence, as part of his cabinet.

He was re-elected at the 4th parliamentary election, held on 19 March 1960, where he polled 8,680 votes (53% of the total vote). He was expelled from the Sri Lanka Freedom Party, after expressing his views that it should join the United National Party, and subsequently switched political allegiances moving to the United National Party. At the 5th parliamentary election, held on 20 July 1960, he contested the seat of Kundasale on behalf of the United National Party. He failed to defeat the sitting member from the Sri Lanka Freedom Party, U. P. Y. Jinadasa, losing the election by 1,586 votes.

At the 6th parliamentary election, held on 22 March 1965, he returned to the seat of Wattegama, this time as the United National Party candidate, after the sitting member, Abeyratne Ratnayaka, agreed to be appointed to the Senate of Ceylon. Weerakoon received 12,373 votes (56% of the total vote), defeating the Sri Lanka Freedom Party candidate, A. G. Fernando, by 2,912 votes. In his time in parliament he was responsible for setting up an Industrial Estate and Textile Factory in Pallekele.

At the 7th parliamentary election, held on 27 May 1970, he was unable to retain his seat, losing to Fernando by 1,972 votes.

Weerakoon died on 22 May 1988. Weerakoon Gardens and P. B. A. Weerakoon Mawatha in Kandy are named in recognition of his services.
