= P. B. Sannasgala =

Sri Lankan academic and linguist

Punchi Bandara Sannasgala

Personal details
- Born: 15 June 1915
- Died: 22 March 1997 (aged 81)
- Spouse: Nalini Ratnayaka
- Children: 5
- Education: St. John's College, Panadura; University of Colombo; University of Peradeniya
- Profession: oriental scholar

Punchi Bandara Sannasgala (known as Professor P. B. Sannasgala or Professor Sannasgala) (15 June 1915 – 22 March 1997) was a Sri Lankan academic and linguist. Noted oriental scholar, he was a researcher on Sinhala language, Sinhala literature, Pali and Sanskrit. He is the author of `Sinhala Saahithya Wanshaya' in the 1960s.

== Early life and education ==
Born in Ambagasdowegedara, Ambawela, Uva Province of Ceylon, he was the eldest of eight siblings which included three brothers and four sisters. Receiving is primary education at the local school, he then studied at the Pravacanodaya Pirivena gaining many awards before entering St. John's College, Panadura for his secondary education. He entered Ceylon University College. Having graduated with a BA (Honours) in Sinhala, he went on to gained a masters and Doctor of Philosophy from the University of Ceylon. His submission for a Doctor of Letters degree from the Vidyalankara Campus (University of Kelaniya) in 1976 was not carried out by the university although the examiners approved the granting of the degree on his thesis "Sinhala Vocables of Dutch Origin".

== Academic career ==
Starting on his academic career in 1947, he joined the Sinhala Dictionary project in the 1950s. He authored may books and was member of the faculty of the University of Colombo and the University of Kelaniya.

== Family ==
He married Nalini Ratnayaka, daughter of Abeyratne Ratnayaka, first Cabinet Minister of Food, Co-operatives and later Minister of Home Affairs. They had five daughters, including Professor Kshanika Hirimburegama.
