= Henry Peiris =

Ceylonese Marxist politician (1910–1959)

Mahatelage Henry Peiris (2 May 1910 – 1959) was a Ceylonese Marxist politician and a pioneer member of the country's socialist movement.

Peiris was a Lanka Sama Samaja Party activist, a compatriot of Leslie Goonewardene and the editor/publisher of the underground Marxist newspaper, Samasamajaya.

At the 1st parliamentary election, held on 16 September 1947, Peiris successfully ran as the Bolshevik Samasamaja Party candidate in the Pandura electorate, defeated his more credentialed opponent, Sir Susantha de Fonseka, (the United National Party candidate and the former deputy speaker of the State Council of Ceylon) by 2,546 votes.

Pieris contested the 2nd parliamentary election held between 24 May 1952 and 30 May 1952 but failed to retain his seat, losing to the United National Party candidate, D. C. W. Kannangara, by 3,856 votes.

Peiris' son, Janadasa (1942 – 2013), was a National List Member of Parliament, Chairman of the Associated Newspapers of Ceylon Ltd and Chairman of the Sri Lanka Broadcasting Corporation.
