= Kannangara =

Kannangara (Sinhala: කන්නන්ගර; Tamil: கன்னங்கரா) is a surname found in Sri Lanka. Notable people with this name include:

- C. W. W. Kannangara (1894 – 1969), a Sri Lankan lawyer and politician
- D. C. W. Kannangara (1913 – 1999), a Sri Lankan politician
- E. W. Kannangara (1894 – after 1963), a Sri Lankan civil servant
- R. C. Kannangara (1920 – 1946), a Sri Lankan plantation owner and politician
- Siri Kannangara (died 2024), a Sri Lankan-Australian sports doctor
- Upali Kannangara (1951 – 2018), a Sri Lankan musician
- Wimala Kannangara (1920 – 2006), a Sri Lankan politician
