= MV Thermopylae Sierra =

Bulk carrier sank off Sri Lanka

History

Cyprus
- Name: Thermopylae Sierra
- Owner: Thesarco Shipping
- Ordered: 1985
- Builder: Shin Nipponkai Heavy Industries
- Out of service: 2009
- Renamed: 1989 Fideconbus; 1998 Knin; 2002 Nara; 2005 Yamm
- Identification: Call sign: C4FX2; IMO number: 8313075; MMSI number: 212399000
- Fate: Sank on 23 August 2012 off Panadura, Sri Lanka

General characteristics
- Type: Bulk carrier
- Tonnage: 15,612 GT; 24,779 DWT
- Length: 155 m (508 ft 6 in) (overall)
- Beam: 27 m (88 ft 7 in)

MV Thermopylae Sierra was a Cyprus-flagged bulk carrier operated by Thesarco Shipping which sank off the coast of Panadura, Sri Lanka, in 2012.

== Description and construction ==
Thermopylae Sierra was a 155-meter (508 ft 6 in) long and 27 m (88 ft 7 in) wide bulk carrier that measured 15,612 gross tonnage (GT) and 24,779 tons deadweight (DWT). The ship was manufactured in 1985 by Shin Nipponkai Heavy Industries at their yard in Toyama, Japan.

== Sinking ==
The ship was detained in Sri Lanka since 2009 on a court order after a dispute involving the cargo and its crew, The ship's crew originally remained on board but later withdrew, claiming they were being denied food and other basic services. Left untended the vessel fell into disrepair and the subsequent environmental risks associated with its submersion increased. Prolonged exposure to marine conditions without requisite maintenance led to a progressive decline in the structural integrity of the ship, culminating in water ingress. The ship sank on 23 August 2012 due to corrosion of the hull at anchorage near Panadura, south of Colombo.

Prior to the vessel's sinking, onboard engineering personnel issued cautionary statements regarding the potential for specific cargo items remaining within the ship's hull to negatively impact local marine ecosystems. Of particular concern was the proximity of the sinking site to the shoreline, thereby increasing the probability of ecological contamination.

== Environment impact ==
The Sri Lankan Marine Environment Protection Authority (MEPA) has stated that a substantial portion of the oil onboard the subject vessel was extracted prior to its submersion. Based on this, MEPA anticipated a minimal major environmental impact resulting from potential residual oil leakage.

=== Further assessment of residual oil and contingency measures ===
Initial reports indicated an approximate volume of 350 tons of oil present on the vessel. Subsequent removal efforts have reduced this quantity to an estimated 75 tons remaining onboard. In anticipation of potential environmental consequences arising from even this reduced volume, a contingency plan has been activated to mitigate any surfacing oil and address associated impacts.

== Aftermath ==
Despite its derelict status, the submerged vessel has undergone ecological transformation, functioning as a habitat for various marine species. An ecological survey conducted off the western coast of Sri Lanka, encompassing assessments of coral reef ecosystems and shipwrecks such as Thermopylae Sierra, indicated a higher abundance of fish assemblages associated with shipwreck sites compared to natural coral reefs in the vicinity of Colombo.
