= Arthur V. Dias =

Arthur Vincent Dias
- Born: February 10, 1886; Panadura
- Died: July 31, 1960 (aged 74)
- Other names: Kos Mama
- Education: St Thomas' College; St. John's College Panadura
- Occupation: Planter
- Known for: Independence activist Pioneered jackfruit propagation campaign
- Spouse: Grace Salgado
- Parent(s): P. Jeremias Dias; Selestina Rodrigo

Arthur Vincent Dias (10 February 1886 – 31 July 1960), commonly known as Arthur V. Dias, was a philanthropist, temperance movement member and an independence activist of Sri Lanka (then known as Ceylon). A planter by profession, he is known for the jackfruit propagation campaign he pioneered throughout the country, which earned him the name "Kos Mama" (Sin. ''Jack Fruit Uncle'). A national hero of Sri Lanka, Dias also helped a number of educational establishments in the country. Before Sri Lanka gained independence from British rule, he was imprisoned by the colonial government and sentenced to death, although he was later released.

== Personal life ==
Arthur Vincent Dias was born on 10 February 1886 to a wealthy family in Panadura. His father was P. Jeremias Dias, a plantation owner and a franchiser of arrack. His mother was Selestina Rodrigo, a philanthropist who later helped found the Visakha Vidyalaya. Dias received his primary education from St. John's College Panadura and his secondary education from St Thomas' College, Mt. Lavinia. His father died in 1902. After completing his education, Dias took over his family's plantation businesses. He later married Grace Salgado. The couple had nine children; five daughters and four sons. Dias died on 31 July 1960.

== Temperance movement ==
The British colonial government of Ceylon issued a decree in 1912, that permitted taverns to be opened throughout the country. This prompted a temperance movement, which was pioneered by some prominent personalities in the country such as Anagarika Dharmapala, D. S. Senanayake, F.R. Senanayake, W. A. de Silva and D. B. Jayatilaka. Dias was also a leading member of this group, which became the basis for the independence movement of the country.

When riots broke out in the country in 1915 between Sinhalese and Moors, Dias, along with the leaders of the temperance movement, was arrested on suspicion of supporting the riots. Dias was sentenced to death, which was later reduced to imprisonment for life. However, he was later fined and released, as were the others. After being freed from prison, he pledged to dedicate himself for gaining independence for Ceylon from British rule. Dias continued his temperance activities after the country gained independence as well, and strongly objected to Prime Minister D. S. Senanayake about serving liquor at the official independence day celebrations.

== Nationalism and philanthropy ==
Dias wore a white banian and cloth instead of western clothing, and encouraged writing and signing in Sinhala. He became a national hero after the country gained independence. He had declined a knighthood offered by Governor Andrew Caldecott, as well as a seat in the senate in 1957, offered to him by Prime Minister S.W.R.D. Bandaranaike.

He also contributed significantly to education in the country. Dias was a member of the first board of governors of Visakha Vidyalaya, and helped Ananda College financially. Other schools that received help from Dias include the Nalanda College, Dharmaraja College and Dharmasoka College. He also donated a plot of land for the Sri Sumangala College in Panadura, on which the school was built.

== Jackfruit propagation campaign ==
Dias started a jackfruit propagation campaign on 11 June 1918, with the aim of planting a million jackfruit trees. Having imported jackfruit seedlings from Johore, Malaysia, he proceeded to distribute packets of seedlings and plants free of charge. Although his campaign mainly focused on distributing jackfruit seedlings, he also distributed other plants such as papaw, mango, sapodilla, durian and golden apple. This campaign earned him the name "Kos Mama" or "Kos Ata Mama" which directly translates to ''Jack fruit uncle'' or ''Jack Fruit Seed Uncle''.
