= K. D. David Perera =

Sri Lankan businessman and politician

Hon. K. D. David Perera

Member of the Ceylon Parliament for Bandaragama
- In office July 1960 – 1968
- Preceded by: D. C. W. Kannangara
- Succeeded by: George Kotelawala

Personal details
- Born: 19 November 1924
- Party: Sri Lanka Freedom Party
- Spouse: Athaledge Dona
- Profession: politician

Kongahakankanamage Don David Perera (born 19 November 1924) was a Ceylonese planter, businessman and politician.

Perera attended the Buddhist Mixed School in Milleniya, Sri Sumangala College in Panadura, and at Ananda College, Colombo.

At the parliamentary elections in March 1960 Perera contested the Bandaragama electorate, where he lost by 3,123 votes to the United National Party rival, D. C. W. Kannangara. However, as the election left neither of the country's two major parties with a majority, another election was called. At the subsequent July election Kannangara was defeated by the Perera by 5,666 votes.

Perera was re-elected at the 1965 parliamentary elections defeating Kannangara, this time by 3,421 votes.

Following the 1965 parliamentary elections two election petitions were lodged with the courts seeking the election results be declared void on the grounds that Perera or persons acting on his behalf published false statements about the personal character of D. C. W. Kannangara. They were initially dismissed by the Election Judge on 5 June 1966, whereupon an appeal was lodged by the claimants to the Supreme Court. The Supreme Court determined on 12 May 1967 that the Election Judge had misdirected himself in law and a fresh election for the seat of Bandaragama was called and held on 23 September 1967.

At the subsequent parliamentary by-election held on 23 September 1967, Perera was re-elected, receiving 23,840 votes (56% of the total vote), 5,468 votes ahead of the United National Party candidate, George Kotalawala.

Following the 1967 parliamentary by-election, further petitions were lodged with the courts seeking the by-election results to be declared void on the grounds that Perera should have been disqualified from running on the grounds that the Supreme Court ruling in 1967 disqualified him under the constitution. Following a hearing in June 1968 the Supreme Court decided the results of the 1967 by-election be declared void and on 5 March 1969 Kotalawala was appointed as the member for Bandaragama.
