= Abeyratne Ratnayaka =

Sri Lankan politician

Hon. Abeyratne Ratnayaka
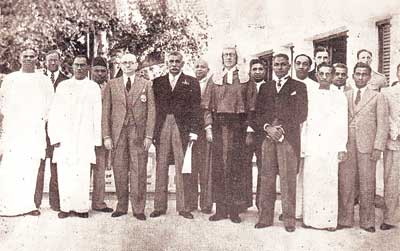
- A. Ratnayaka in the first Cabinet of Ministers of Ceylon

President of the Senate of Ceylon
- In office 1965–1971

Member of the Ceylon Parliament for Wattegama
- In office 14 October 1947 – 1956
- Succeeded by: Aloysius Weerakoon
- In office 1960–1965
- Preceded by: Aloysius Weerakoon
- Succeeded by: Aloysius Weerakoon

Personal details
- Born: 14 July 1900
- Died: 1977 (aged 76–77)
- Party: United National Party
- Education: Royal College, Colombo, Dharmaraja College

Ratnayake Wasala Mudiyanselage Abeyratne Ratnayaka (7 January 1900 - 1977) was a Sri Lankan politician. He was the first Cabinet Minister of Food, Co-operatives; Minister of Home Affairs in independent Ceylon (now Sri Lanka) and the last President of the Senate of Ceylon.

== Education ==
He received his primary education at Dharmaraja College Kandy and secondary education at Royal College Colombo.

== Political career ==
Ratnayaka was elected to the first State Council of Ceylon from Dumbara and reelected to the second State Council of Ceylon. As a member of the Executive Committee on Education, he suggested that education should be free from kindergarten to university, an idea he had received from a private member, which though supported by P. de S. Kularatne, S. Natesan and T. B. Jayah, was opposed by C. W. W. Kannangara. He was elected to the first parliament from the Wattegama in the 1947 general elections from the United National Party. Thereafter he was invited by D. S. Senanayake to join his cabinet as the Minister for Food and Cooperatives Undertakings. Following D. S. Senanayake's death he served in the same capacity until he was appointed Minister of Home Affairs in 1952, following the 1952 general elections when he was re-elected from Wattegama. He remained Minister of Home Affairs in the Kotelawala cabinet until he was defeated at the 1956 general elections by Aloysius Weerakoon from the Sri Lanka Freedom Party. Contesting the March 1960 general election, he was again defeated by Weerakoon, but won the subsequent July 1960 general election, with Weerakoon switching to the United National Party and contesting the seat of Kundasale. He sat in the opposition until the 1965 general election when he allowed Weerakoon to contest his seat as the United National Party candidate. Ratnayaka was appointed to the Senate of Ceylon in 1965 and was elected President of the Senate of Ceylon succeeding Thomas Amarasuriya and serving till the abolishment of the Senate in 1971.

== Family ==
His daughter of Nalini Ratnayaka married Professor Punchi Bandara Sannasgala, an academic researcher on Sinhala language, Sinhala literature, Pali and Sanskrit. His granddaughter Professor Kshanika Hirimburegama, was the Vice Chancellor of the University of Colombo and the first lady Chairperson of the University Grant Commission.
