= St. John's College, Panadura =

Coordinates: 6°43′22″N 79°54′50″E

St. John's National school
- Udahamulla, Panadura; Sri Lanka

Information
- Type: National school
- Motto: උත්සාහවන්තයාට කළ නොහැක්කක් නොමැත; Latin: Nihil Amanti Difficile
- Religious affiliation: Buddhist
- Established: 1876
- Founder: Mudliyar Susew de Soysa Arnold Jansz (1882)
- Principal: A. Y. P. Perera
- Faculty: Commerce, Combined maths, Biology, Arts and Technology
- Grades: Class 6 –13
- Gender: Mixed
- Age: 11 to 19
- Colours: Green, silver
- Website: http://www.sjcpanadura.com

St. John's College is a school in Panadura, Sri Lanka, that was founded in 1876. It is a National school with a student population of 3500 and staff of about 150

== History ==
St. John's College was initially known as 'Primary State English School' which had existed from about the middle of the 19th century. In 1876 it received land and endowments from Wasala Mudliyar Susew de Soysa (1809–1881) as well as Sir Charles Henry de Soysa and was named 'St. John's College' by the Anglican Bishop of Colombo, Reginald Stephen Copleston. It was ceremonially opened by the Governor William Henry Gregory on 14 June 1876 (along with the Prince of Wales' College, Moratuwa).

In 1882, the headmaster, Cyril Arnold Jansz, was appointed as the first principal by the Bishop of Colombo of the Anglican church, at the request of the people of Panadura and has rendered an immense service for the upliftment of the school. Starting with 75 students the numbers raised gradually and in 1885 classes for girls began at St John's started by Mrs Jansz. The school celebrated the 125th anniversary during the year 2000.

== Battle of Greens ==
The annual big match is played between St. John's College and Panadura Royal College. It is known as the Battle of the Greens .

== Notable alumni ==
The alumni of St. John's College are known as Old Johnians. Alumni include:

Name	Notability	Reference
Premasiri Khemadasa	musician, composer	
Ediriweera Sarachchandra	playwright, novelist, poet, literary critic, essayist	
Gunapala Piyasena Malalasekera	academic, diplomat	
Sir Susantha de Fonseka	member State Council - Panadura (1931–1947)	
Sir Bennet Soysa	member State Council, Senate, Mayor of Kandy (1949, 1954–1956, 1961–1962, 1968–1970)	
Edmund Peiris	Gate Mudaliyar - Panadura, Kalutara	
Wilmot A. Perera	philanthropist and member parliament - Matugama (1947–1956)	
Arthur V. Dias	independence activist, philanthropist	
Leslie Goonewardene	independence activist and member parliament - Panadura (1956–1977)	
Colvin R. de Silva	member parliament - Wellawatte-Galkissa (1947–1952, 1956–1960), Agalawatte (1970–1977)	
Lalith Athulathmudali	member parliament - Colombo (1989–1993)	
Reginald Perera	member parliament - Dehiowita (1947–1952), Senator (1959–1971)	
Percy Samaraweera	Chief Minister of Uva Province (1988), member parliament - Welimada (1965–1970, 1977–1988)	
Ravindra Pushpakumara	international cricket player (1994–2001)	
Charitha Buddhika	international cricket player (2001–2002)	
Sangeetha Weeraratne	actress	
