= Jayathri Samarakone =

Sri Lankan diplomat

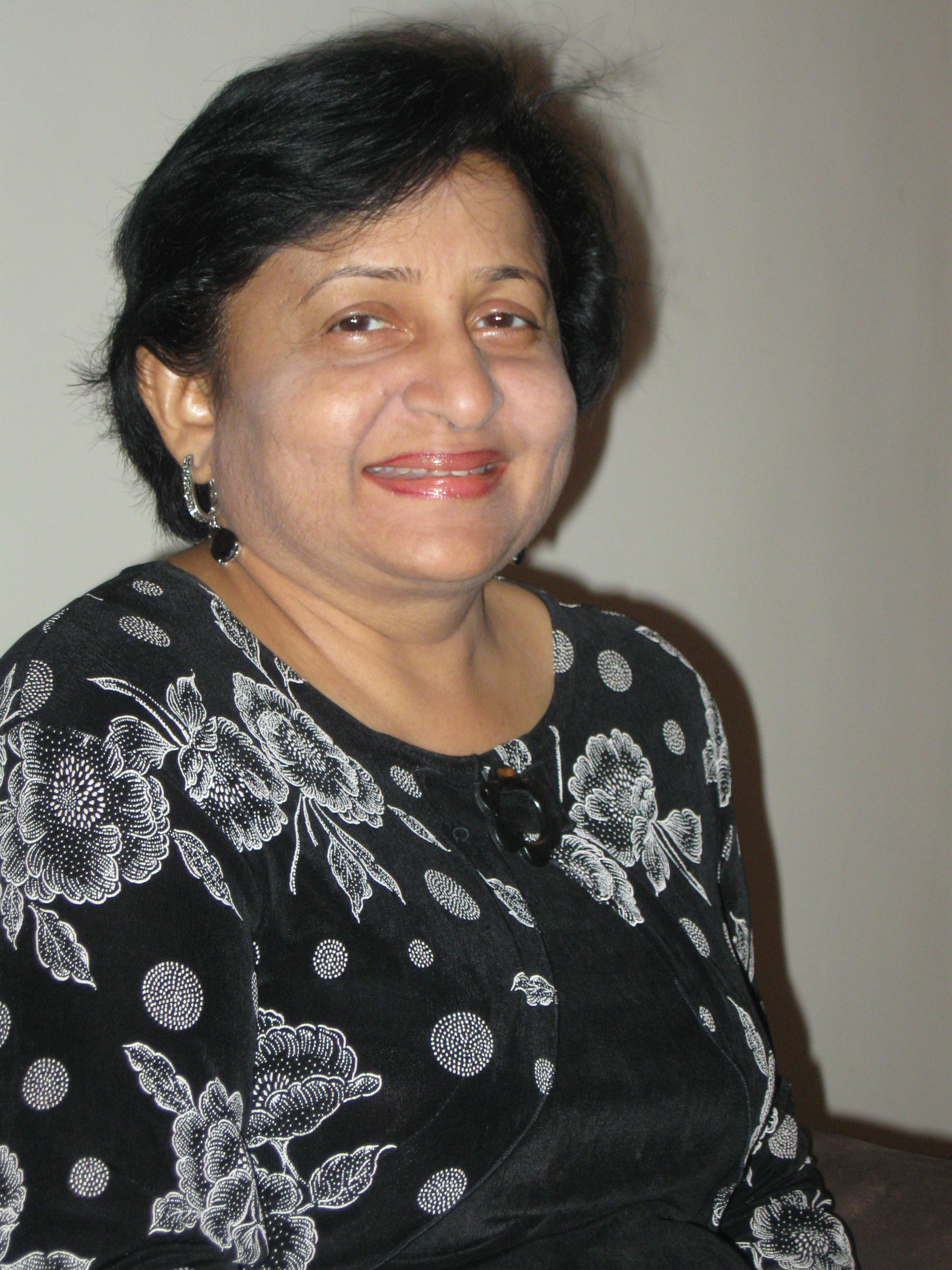

Sri Lankan High Commissioner to Singapore
- In office 2008–2011

Personal details
- Born: 18 September 1953 (age 72)
- Occupation: Lawyer and Diplomat
- Profession: Lawyer

Jayathri Ranjani Samarakone (born 18 September 1953) (known as Jayathri Samarakone) is a former Sri Lankan High Commissioner to Singapore. She is a Sri Lankan lawyer, accountant and former diplomat.

== Early life ==
She is the third daughter of Donald Samarakone (formerly of Ceylon Civil Service) and Srima (née Rathnayake). Samarakone has three sisters Kusum, Sucharitha and Deepthi.

== Education ==
She was educated at Visakha Vidyalaya, Colombo and attended Sri Lanka Law College where she graduated as a lawyer with Honours in 1979. She became an associate member of Sri Lanka Chartered Institute of Management Accountants in 1982.

== Diplomatic role ==
In 2008 she was appointed as a Sri Lankan High Commissioner to Singapore, where she served as the Head of the Sri Lanka Diplomatic Mission for a period of 3 years. During that time, she played an important role in promoting Ceylon tea, investment, trade, tourism and strengthening the diplomatic relations of Sri Lanka with Singapore.

== See also ==
- List of Sri Lankan non-career diplomats
