= Wattegama Electoral District =

Electoral district of Sri Lanka

Wattegama electoral district was an electoral district of Sri Lanka between August 1947 and July 1977. The district was named after the City of Wattegama in Kandy District, Central Province. The 1978 Constitution of Sri Lanka introduced the proportional representation electoral system for electing members of Parliament. The existing 160 mainly single-member electoral districts were replaced with 22 multi-member electoral districts. Wattegama electoral district was replaced by the Kandy multi-member electoral district at the 1989 general elections, the first under the proportional representation system, continues to be a polling division of the multi-member electoral district.

== Members of Parliament ==
Key

Independent SLFP UNP

Election	Member	Party	Term
1947	Abeyratne Ratnayaka	United National Party	1947–1952
1952	Abeyratne Ratnayaka	United National Party	1952–1956
1956	Aloysius Weerakoon	Sri Lanka Freedom Party	1956–1960
1960 (March)	Aloysius Weerakoon	Sri Lanka Freedom Party	1960
1960 (July)	Abeyratne Ratnayaka	United National Party	1960–1965
1965	Aloysius Weerakoon	United National Party	1965–1970
1970	A. G. Fernando	Sri Lanka Freedom Party	1970–1977

== Elections ==
=== 1947 Parliamentary General Election ===
Results of the 1st parliamentary election held between 23 August 1947 and 20 September 1947:

Candidate	Party	Symbol	Votes	%
Abeyratne Ratnayaka	United National Party	Elephant	14,788	78.73
B. P. Percy Perera		Hand	3,477	18.51
Valid Votes			18,265	97.24
Rejected Votes			519	2.76
Total Polled			18,784	100.00
Registered Electors			32,009	
Turnout				58.68

=== 1952 Parliamentary General Election ===
Results of the 2nd parliamentary election held between 24 May 1952 and 30 May 1952:

Candidate	Party	Symbol	Votes	%
Abeyratne Ratnayaka	United National Party	Elephant	14,264	62.29
P. N. Dharmasena		Wheel	5,381	23.50
Charles Amunugama		Key	2,903	12.68
Valid Votes			22,548	98.46
Rejected Votes			353	1.54
Total Polled			22,901	100.00
Registered Electors			31,840	
Turnout				71.93

=== 1956 Parliamentary General Election ===
Results of the 3rd parliamentary election held between 5 April 1956 and 10 April 1956:

Candidate	Party	Symbol	Votes	%
Aloysius Weerakoon	Sri Lanka Freedom Party	Hand	14,657	56.12
Abeyratne Ratnayaka	United National Party	Elephant	11,109	42.54
Valid Votes			25,766	98.66
Rejected Votes			351	1.34
Total Polled			26,117	100.00
Registered Electors			36,461	
Turnout				71.63

=== 1960 (March) Parliamentary General Election ===
Results of the 4th parliamentary election held on 19 March 1960:

Candidate	Party	Symbol	Votes	%
Aloysius Weerakoon	Sri Lanka Freedom Party	Hand	8,680	53.04
Abeyratne Ratnayaka	United National Party	Elephant	7,110	43.45
Vipula Dharmawardena		Cartwheel	399	2.44
Valid Votes			61,189	98.93
Rejected Votes			176	1.07
Total Polled			16,365	100.00
Registered Electors			20,093	
Turnout				81.45

=== 1960 (July) Parliamentary General Election ===
Results of the 5th parliamentary election held on 20 July 1960:

Candidate	Party	Symbol	Votes	%
Abeyratne Ratnayaka	United National Party	Elephant	8,317	50.75
G. Wereke	Sri Lanka Freedom Party	Hand	7,960	48.57
Valid Votes			16,277	99.32
Rejected Votes			112	0.68
Total Polled			16,389	100.00
Registered Electors			20,093	
Turnout				81.57

=== 1965 Parliamentary General Election ===
Results of the 6th parliamentary election held on 22 March 1965:

Candidate	Party	Symbol	Votes	%
Aloysius Weerakoon	United National Party	Elephant	12,373	56.02
A. G. Fernando	Sri Lanka Freedom Party	Hand	9,461	42.83
M.G. Ukku Menike Samarakoon		Butterfly	117	0.53
Valid Votes			21,951	99.38
Rejected Votes			137	0.62
Total Polled			22,088	100.00
Registered Electors			25,731	
Turnout				85.84

=== 1970 Parliamentary General Election ===
Results of the 7th parliamentary election held on 27 May 1970:

Candidate	Party	Symbol	Votes	%
A. G. Fernando	Sri Lanka Freedom Party	Hand	12,840	48.64
Aloysius Weerakoon	United National Party	Elephant	10,869	41.18
C. Ratnayake		Ladder	2,598	9.84
Valid Votes			26,307	99.66
Rejected Votes			90	0.34
Total Polled			26,397	100.00
Registered Electors			30,024	
Turnout				87.92
