= Kshanika Hirimburegama =

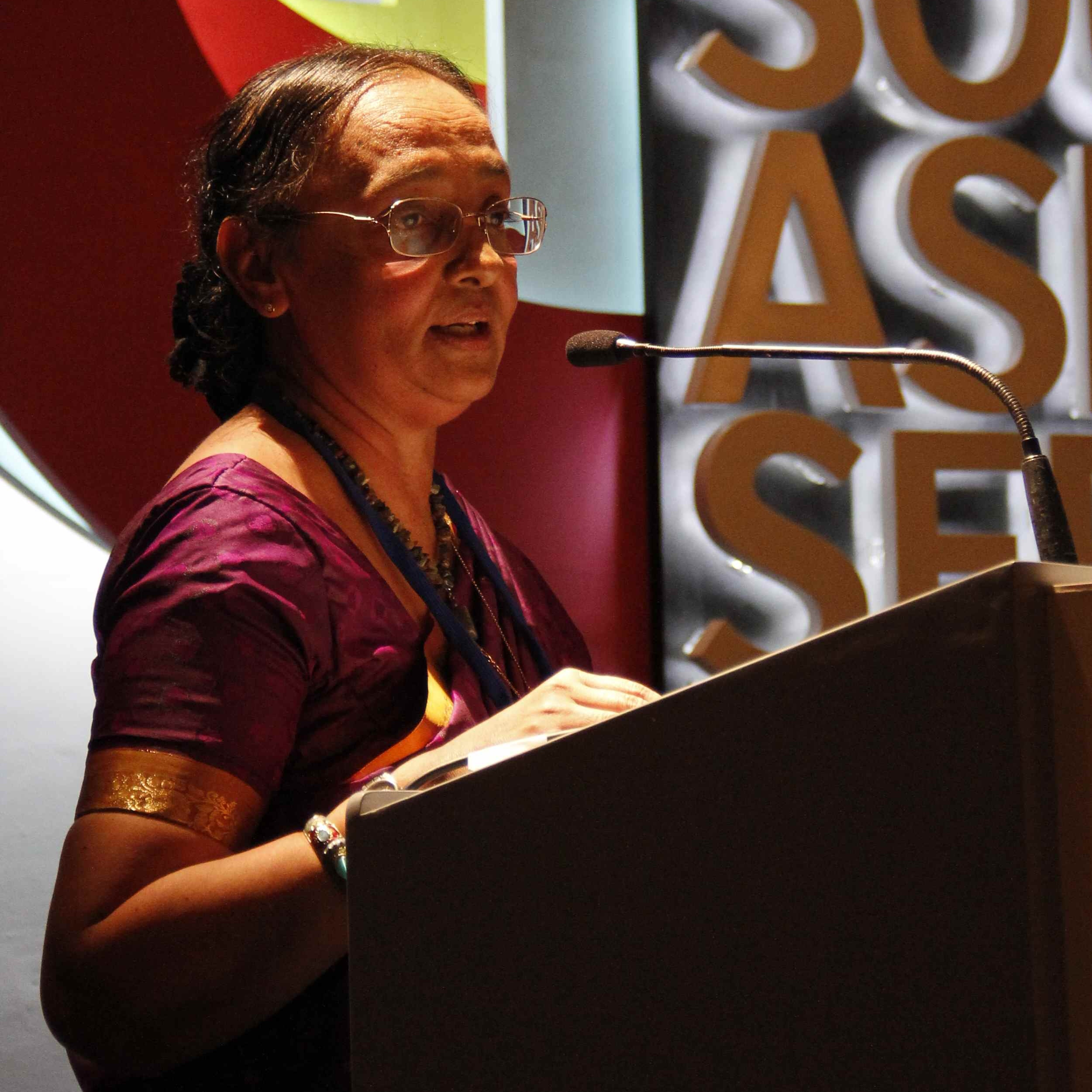

17th Vice-chancellor - University of Colombo
- In office 2 January 2008 – 31 January 2013
- Preceded by: Prof. T. Hettiarachchy
- Succeeded by: Dr. W. K. Hirimburegama

Personal details
- Born: 1 January 1958 (age 68) Colombo, Sri Lanka
- Spouse: Wijaya K. Hirimburegama
- Children: 2
- Education: Visakha Vidyalaya; University of Colombo; University of Peradeniya; Catholic University
- Profession: Academic, botanist

Sannas Mudiyanselage Kshanika Kumari Hirimburegama (known as Kshanika Hirimburegama) (born 1 January 1958) is a Sri Lankan academic. She was the 17th Vice-Chancellor of the University of Colombo. Prior to the appointment she was Head of the Department of Plant Sciences and a member of the University Grants Commission of Sri Lanka. She vacated the position of Vice Chancellor when she assumed duties as the Chairperson of the University Grants Commission in 2013. She is the first lady Chairperson of the University Grants Commission in Sri Lanka. She was the Dean of British College of applied Studies during the 2016–2019.She was the Sri Lankan Ambassador France.

== Early life and education ==
Hirimburegama was born and raised in Colombo, her parents were Professor P. B. Sannasgala, noted oriental scholar and Nalini Ratnayaka, daughter of Abeyratne Ratnayaka, first Cabinet Minister of Food, Co-operatives and later Minister of Home Affairs. She is the fourth out of five daughters born to the Sannasgala family. Her early education was at Visakha Vidyalaya, Colombo.

She entered University of Colombo in 1977 and specialised in Botany. She then entered the Post Graduate Institute of Agriculture (PGIA), Peradeniya and passed out in 1985 with her Masters in Agricultural Sciences. In the same year she left for Belgium to join the Catholic University of Leuven for her PhD. Kshanika married Wijaya Hiriburegama in 1986 whom she met at University of Peradeniya.

== Academic career ==
She and her husband returned to Sri Lanka in 1989 and joined the Botany Department in Colombo University as a Senior Lecturer in January, 1990. She was later made the Head of the Plant Sciences Department before she was appointed Vice-chancellor in January, 2008.

== See also ==
- List of Sri Lankan non-career diplomats
- University of Colombo

Academic offices
Preceded by Prof. T. Hettiarachchy	Vice Chancellor of University of Colombo; 1 January 2008–31 January 2013	Succeeded by Acting
