= Ruchira Silva =

Sri Lankan fashion designer

Ruchira Karunaratne
- Born: Colombo, Sri Lanka
- Label: Rebel

Ruchira Karunaratne, formerly Ruchira Silva, is a well-known Sri Lankan fashion designer. Her creations mainly focusses on casual–wear and evening-wear, available in "Rebel" outlets at leading Shopping malls in Sri Lanka.

== Early life ==
Ruchira had her early education at Sirimavo Bandaranaike Vidyalaya Colombo and finally at Visakha Vidyalaya Colombo.

== Career ==
At the age of 19 years, she opened her first fashion boutique Rebel in 1994, heralding a fashion design and retailing revolution in Sri Lanka. At present she owns 2 high fashion outlets at leading shopping malls in the city of Colombo, as Crescat Boulevard and Majestic City.

She held over 250 fashion shows both locally and abroad, inclusive of Miss Sri Lanka pageant and also has been featured in many high-profile magazines, catalogues and TV channels.
