= Bolshevik–Leninist Party of India, Ceylon and Burma =

- Founder: Edmund Samarakkody, Leslie Goonewardene, N.M. Perera, Colvin R. de Silva, Philip Gunawardena
- Founded: May 1942 (84 years ago)
- Dissolved: 1948
- Succeeded by: Bolshevik Samasamaja Party (Sri Lanka); Socialist Party of India (India)
- Headquarters: Calcutta
- Newspaper: Spark, later renamed New Spark
- Ideology: Communism; Leninism; Trotskyism
- Political position: Far-left
- International affiliation: Fourth International

Bolshevik–Leninist Party of India, Ceylon and Burma (BLPI) was a revolutionary Trotskyist party which campaigned for independence and socialism in South Asia. The party was formed in 1942 as a unification of two Indian groups (the Bolshevik Leninist Party of the United Provinces and Bihar and the Bolshevik Mazdoor Party of India), with the Lanka Sama Samaja Party of Ceylon (Sri Lanka). It was recognised as the Indian section of the Fourth International.

Discussions for the preliminary Committee for the Formation of the Bolshevik - Leninist Party of India took place through underground meetings in Kandy in December 1940 and March 1941 and set the stage for a sole Trotskyist party for India.

During the remainder of World War II, the BLPI influenced the trade union and student movements in several cities. Significant membership was recorded among tramway workers, as well as workers of the Buckingham and Carnatic Mills. The BLPI notably played a major role in the Quit India movement. It produced leaflets and posters giving unconditional support to the movement. It went even further, calling for the troops to revolt. The objective was ultimately for the British expulsion from India. Their efforts to direct the Quit India disruption into a revolutionary one brought significant reprisals, with members forced into hiding. The BLPI was the only political party to give unconditional support to the Royal Indian Navy mutiny.

== Early history ==
=== Before and during WWII ===
==== LSSP war activism in Ceylon ====
At the outbreak of the Second World War in September 1939, the Lanka Sama Samaja Party (LSSP)'s key members were forced to go underground due to its opposition to the British war effort. The two State Council members of the party and others on its Central committee were arrested and jailed.

The leader of the nationalist Ceylon National Congress party and future Prime Minister of Ceylon, D.S. Senanayake tabled a resolution in the State Council, which was the unicameral legislature for Ceylon (now Sri Lanka), established in 1931 by the Donoughmore Constitution, suggesting an approach of "whole-hearted support" to the British government. Leaders of the LSSP – notably Philip Gunawardena who was seen as 'father of Ceylonese Socialism' – denounced the war between the Allies and Axies, who he regarded as imperialist powers, declaring that: "We refuse to be a part of any imperialist war. We are against all imperialist wars and exploitation. The class struggle has refused to stop because a country is at war."

During the early war period, the LSSP served in a key position in a series of worker action and strikes among tea plantation workers, stemming from the Mool Oya Estate incident (December 1939), in which an Indian tea factory worker was fatally shot by police.

==== Ceylonese activism implications for India ====
Through the rampantly increasing striking from the Mool Oya Estate incident, a workers' council was formed suggesting that repercussions of the deepest seriousness in India may come from any response. Following the incident, Colonial police forces used a heavy hand on the tea estates, leading to strong feelings of sentiment and discontent within the workers.

==== Imprisonment of key leaders ====
Sensing the growing anger against them, the LSSP was banned on 18 June, and key party activists —Philip Gunawardena, N.M. Perera, Edmund Samarakkody and Colvin R. de Silva — were detained and imprisoned. Due to its provocative nature towards the British, the LSSP was able to go underground and continue its activism.

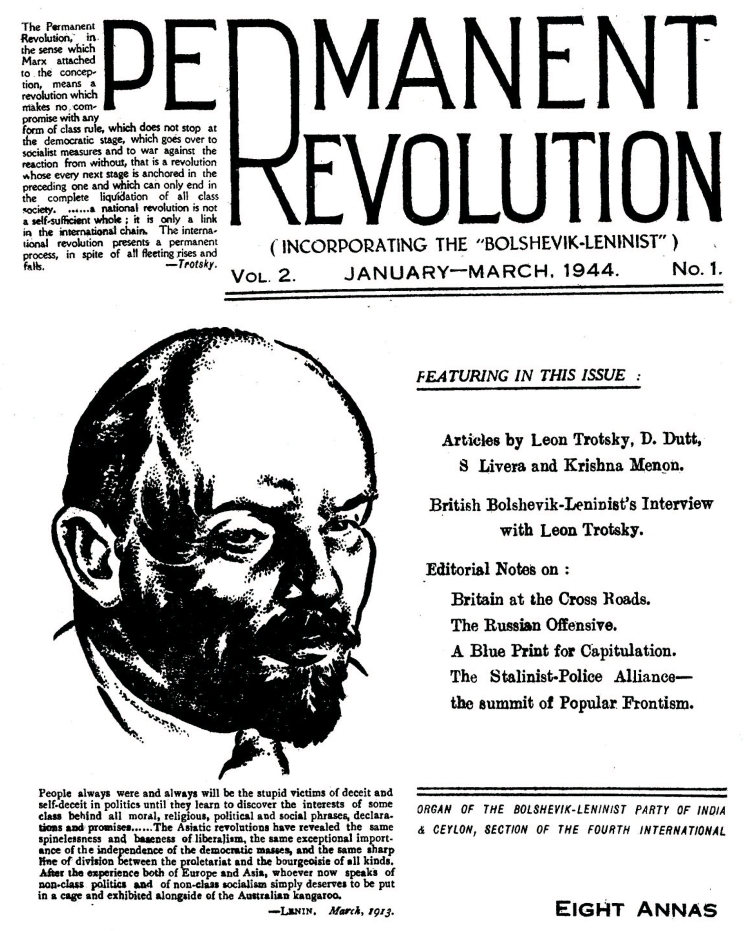
Bolshevik–Leninist Party of India, Ceylon and Burma

==== LSSP's move to India and establishment of the Bolshevik Leninist Party of India ====
Through discussion, the Indian and Ceylonese trotskyists established a preliminary Committee for the Formation of the Bolshevik - Leninist Party of India. The discussions for this took place through underground meetings in Kandy in December 1940 and March 1941 and set the stage for a sole Trotskyist party for India. This was later amended to include Burma and Ceylon. The meeting in 1940 and 41 were attended by the jailed LSSP leaders aided by some guards of the Bogambara Prison.

Though many were detained in Ceylon, several party leaders were able to escape to India, evading arrest. These included Party General Secretary Leslie Goonewardene and his wife, Vivienne Goonewardene. They settled in Calcutta, and established networks with the local Trotskyist networks. Other Ceylonese Trotskysists established contact with the Uttar Pradesh Trotskyist group, as well as groups in Bombay and Madras. On 7 April 1942, Philip Gunawardena, N. M. Perera, Edmund Samarakkody and Colvin R. de Silva escaped from prison aided by the prison guards and party activists Doric de Souza and Vernon Gunasekera. The BLPI was formed in May 1942 and was approved by the Fourth International.

=== War period for the newly formed BLPI ===
During World War II, the BLPI remained relatively small – a large contrast to the high expectations of a Subcontinent-wide political revolutionary party. While the BLPI's name suggests that it also represented Burma, there was arguably no party representation there.

The Bolshevik Leninist Party found initial success, launching Spark, its party publication issued in Calcutta. Due to political suppression, the publication was moved to Bombay, and name changed to 'New Spark'. They published Trotsky's Open Letter to the Indian Workers, and other pieces.

During the remainder of World War II, the BLPI influenced the trade union and student movements in several cities. Significant membership was recorded among tramway workers, as well as workers of the Buckingham and Carnatic Mills.

== Post-war and the Quit India movement ==
=== Quit India ===
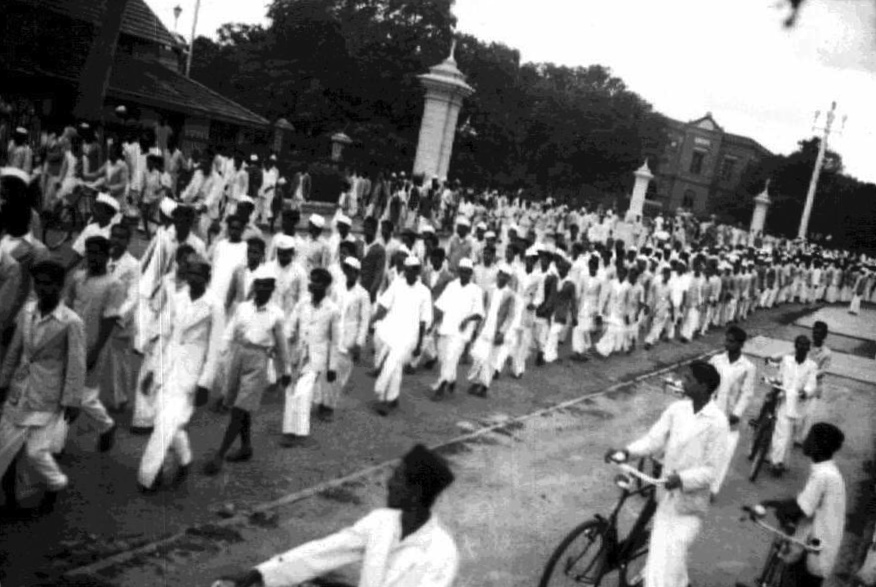
Quit India procession in Bangalore

The BLPI took part extensively in the Quit India movement. It produced leaflets and posters giving unconditional support to the movement. It went even further, calling for the troops to revolt. In Bombay the party recruited student activists and organised strikes, as well as influencing Congress propaganda. The objective was ultimately for the British expulsion from India. Their efforts to direct the Quit India disruption into a revolutionary one brought significant reprisals, with members forced into hiding.

In Calcutta the BLPI joined a United Front with the Congress Socialist Party, the Revolutionary Socialist Party and the Forward Bloc. The front distributed leaflets. In South India, Uttar Pradesh and Bihar the BLPI distributed leaflets and led demonstrations.

=== Relationship with the Indian National Congress ===
The BLPI released details of issues within the Indian National Congress; these notably included its close connection to the landlords and its ignorance of promises made during the mass civil disobedience movements in the earlier part of the century. The BLPI also maintained a strained relationship with the Communist Party of India, who they argued had become corrupted by Stalinism. The BLPI also used the Communist Party's war stances to gain political leverage. Whereas the Communist Party of India (CPI) supported anti-fascism before the war, this changed with the Molotov–Ribbentrop Pact of August 1939, leading the CPI to change their stance to that of opposition of war. This position again changed with the betrayal and subsequent invasion of the USSR by the Nazis, after which the CPI advocated for a British success.

=== Party split ===
Following the Quit India movement, hope was rife among South-Asian Socialist leaders. K. Tilak (Leslie Goonewardene) wrote that 'The young Bolshevik-Leninist Party ... now faces its first real chance for expansion ... The situation is changing and without doubt, of all of the parties and political groups in India, the BLPI is the one which is going to gain the most in this change'.

Following the end of the Second World War, it was determined that the Ceylonese Lanka Sama Samaja Party should be separated from the BLPI.

=== Bombay mutiny ===
The Royal Indian Navy revolt (also called the Royal Indian Navy mutiny or Bombay mutiny) encompassed a total strike and subsequent revolt by Indian sailors of the Royal Indian Navy on board ship and shore establishments at Bombay harbour on 18 February 1946. From the initial flashpoint in Bombay, the revolt spread and found support throughout British India, from Karachi to Calcutta, and ultimately came to involve over 20,000 sailors in 78 ships and shore establishments. The mutiny was repressed with force by British troops and Royal Navy warships. Total casualties were 8 dead and 33 wounded.

The only political party to give unconditional support to the revolt was the BLPI. As soon as it got news of the revolt it came out with a call for a Hartal in support of the mutineers. BLPI members Prabhakar More and Lakshman Jadhav led the textile workers out on strike. Barricades were set up and held for three days. However, attempts to contact the mutineers were foiled by British troops.

=== Post-war Sri Lanka ===
After the war, when the formerly exiled Ceylonese politicians returned home, they came back to a divided movement. Two of the main leaders of LSSP, N.M. Perera and Philip Gunawardena, had been released from jail. They now reconstructed LSSP as an independent party, the core being the 'Workers' Opposition' faction, which held the trade unions. Effectively there were two parallel LSSPs, one led by Perera and Gunawardena and the BLPI-section led by Colvin R de Silva, Leslie Goonawardene and Edmund Samarakkoddy, which had been formed around the Bolshevik-Leninist Faction of Doric de Souza. The English language organ of the BLPI-section was Fight. There was a brief reconciliation between the two factions in 1946.

The BLPI section contested the 1947 election, in which it gained 5 seats in Parliament, compared to the LSSP's 10. In the 1947 election, the BLPI was the party with the third highest overall votes, with the LSSP becoming the main opposition party. The Ceylon section of BLPI was converted into the Bolshevik Samasamaja Party, the Ceylon section of the Fourth International.

=== Post-war India ===
The remainder of the BLPI in India was concentrated in Calcutta, Madras and Madurai, where the party was active in trade union work. In 1946 S. C. C. Anthonypillai, one of the Ceylonese (Sri Lankan) political leaders, was elected President of the Madras Labour Union (India's oldest union) and the Madras and Southern Mahratta Railway Workers' Union.

In 1948, the Fourth International asked the party to enter the Socialist Party of India and practice entryism there.

== Leaders and important members ==
- Leslie Goonewardene
- Vivienne Goonewardene
- Philip Gunawardena
- Dr Colvin R. de Silva
- Dr N. M. Perera
- Edmund Samarakkody
- S. C. C. Anthonypillai
- Kamalesh Bannerji
- Onkar Nath Shastri
- Doric de Souza
- Chandravadan Shukla
- Raj Narayan Arya
- Kusumasiri Gunawardena
- Bernard Soysa
- Hector Abhayavardhana
- Vinayak Purohit
- Raghuvir Kodial
