= Bandaragama Electoral District =

Electoral district of Sri Lanka

Bandaragama electoral district was an electoral district of Sri Lanka between March 1960 and February 1989. The district was named after the town of Bandaragama in Kalutara District, Western Province. The 1978 Constitution of Sri Lanka introduced the proportional representation electoral system for electing members of Parliament. The existing 160 mainly single-member electoral districts were replaced with 22 multi-member electoral districts. Bandaragama electoral district was replaced by the Kalutara multi-member electoral district at the 1989 general elections.

== Members of Parliament ==
Key

Independent SLFP UNP

Election	Member	Party	Term
1960 (March)	D. C. W. Kannangara	United National Party	1960-1960
1960 (July)	K. D. David Perera	Sri Lanka Freedom Party	1960-1965
1965	K. D. David Perera	Sri Lanka Freedom Party	1965-1967
1967 (by-election)	K. D. David Perera	Sri Lanka Freedom Party	1967-1969
1969 (by-election)	George L. Kotelawala	United National Party	1969-1970
1970	Herbert Wickramasinghe	Sri Lanka Freedom Party	1970 - 1977
1977	Senaraja Samaranayake	United National Party	1977 - 1989

== Elections ==
=== 1960 (March) Parliamentary General Election ===
Results of the 4th parliamentary election held on 19 March 1960 for the district:

Candidate	Party	Symbol	Votes	%
D. C. W. Kannangara	United National Party	Elephant	10,154	33.93
K. D. David Perera	Sri Lanka Freedom Party	Hand	7,031	23.50
R. A. K. Perera		Cartwheel	6,027	20.14
D. W. Wijesooriya		Key	5,113	17.09
Pushpakumara Premaratne		Star	783	2.62
Austin D. Perera		Umbrella	634	2.12
Valid Votes			29,742	99.40
Rejected Votes			181	0.60
Total Polled			29,923	100.00
Registered Electors			37,279	
Turnout				92.70

=== 1960 (July) Parliamentary General Election ===
Results of the 5th parliamentary election held on 20 July 1960 for the district:

Candidate	Party	Symbol	Votes	%
K. D. David Perera	Sri Lanka Freedom Party	Hand	17,510	58.56
D. C. W. Kannangara	United National Party	Elephant	11,844	39.61
R. A. Karunapala Perera		Cartwheel	449	1.50
Valid Votes			29,803	99.67
Rejected Votes			98	0.33
Total Polled			29,901	100.00
Registered Electors			37,279	
Turnout				80.21

=== 1965 Parliamentary General Election ===
Results of the 6th parliamentary election held on 22 March 1965 for the district:

Candidate	Party	Symbol	Votes	%
K. D. David Perera	Sri Lanka Freedom Party	Hand	20,897	53.17
D. C. W. Kannangara	United National Party	Elephant	17,476	44.46
R. A. Karunapala Perera		Cartwheel	504	1.28
Valid Votes			38,877	98.91
Rejected Votes			428	1.09
Total Polled			39,305	100.00
Registered Electors			45,512	
Turnout				86.36

=== 1967 Parliamentary By-Election ===
Following the 1965 parliamentary elections two election petitions were lodged with the courts seeking the election results be declared void on the grounds that Perera or persons acting on his behalf published false statements in relation to the personal character of D. C. W. Kannangara. They were initially dismissed by the Election Judge on 5 June 1966, whereupon an appeal was lodged by the claimants to the Supreme Court. The Supreme Court determined on 12 May 1967 that the Election Judge had misdirected himself in law and a fresh election for the seat of Bandaragama was called and held on 23 September 1967.

Results of the 1967 parliamentary by-election held on 23 September 1967:

Candidate	Party	Symbol	Votes	%
K. D. David Perera	Sri Lanka Freedom Party	Hand	23,840	56.01
George Kotalawala	United National Party	Elephant	18,372	43.16
E. A. Bandara		Scales	211	0.5
Valid Votes			42,423	99.66
Rejected Votes			143	0.34
Total Polled			42,566	100.00
Registered Electors			45,512	
Turnout				93.53

=== 1969 Parliamentary By-Election ===
Following the 1967 parliamentary by-election, a further petitions was lodged with the courts seeking the election results be declared void on the grounds that Perera should have been disqualified from running in the previous by-election, on the grounds that the Supreme Court ruling in 1967 disqualified him under the constitution. Following a hearing in June 1968 the Supreme Court decided the results of the 1967 by-election be declared void.

=== 1970 Parliamentary General Election ===
Results of the 7th parliamentary election held on 27 May 1970 for the district:

Candidate	Party	Symbol	Votes	%
Herbert Wickramasinghe	Sri Lanka Freedom Party	Hand	27,562	62.90
D. C. W. Kannangara	United National Party	Elephant	15,593	35.59
P. R. Ranaraja		Bell	521	1.19
Valid Votes			43,676	99.69
Rejected Votes			138	0.31
Total Polled			43,814	100.00
Registered Electors			51,062	
Turnout				85.81

=== 1977 Parliamentary General Election ===
Results of the 8th parliamentary election held on 21 July 1977 for the district:

Candidate	Party	Symbol	Votes	%
Senaraja Samaranayake	United National Party	Elephant	28,097	55.04
Herbert Wickremasihnghe	Sri Lanka Freedom Party	Hand	19,795	38.78
Vithanage Premachandra Perera		Key	3,034	5.94
Valid Votes			50,926	99.76
Rejected Votes			123	0.24
Total Polled			51,049	100.00
Registered Electors			57,420	
Turnout				88.90
