= Celestina Dias =

Ceylonese philanthropist and businesswoman

Celestina Dias MBE
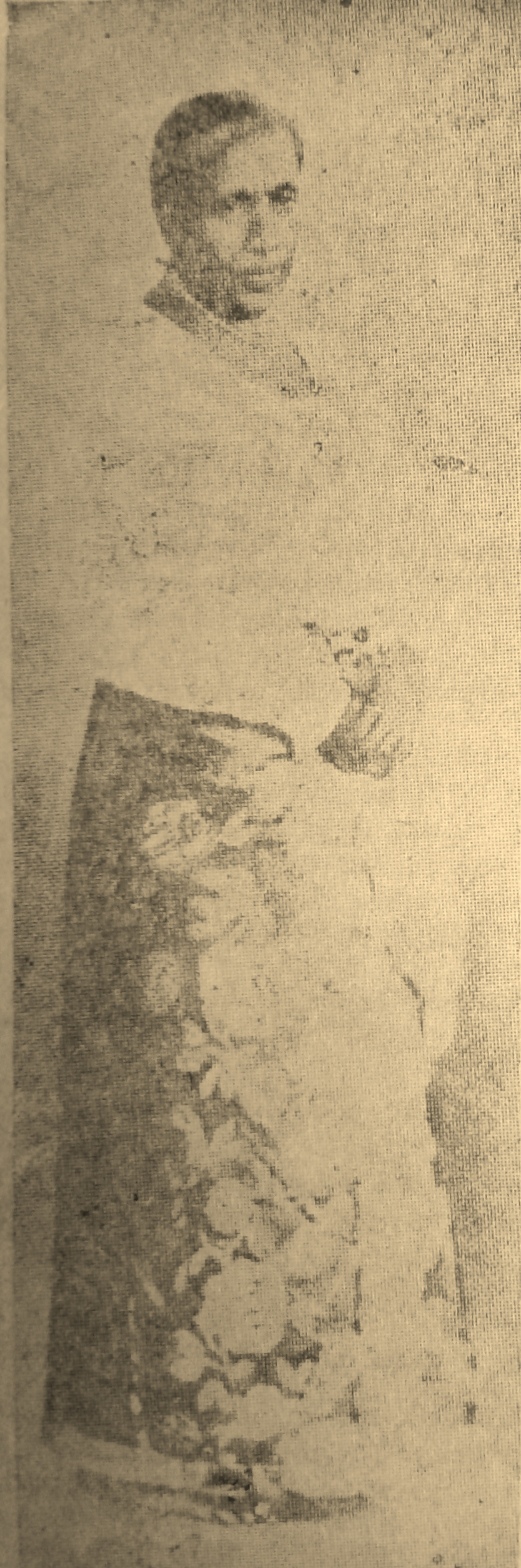
- Celestina Dias aka Mrs. Jeremias Dias
- Born: 11 July 1858; Nalluruwa, Panadura
- Died: 26 March 1933 (aged 74); Panadura
- Other names: Mrs. Jeremias Dias
- Occupations: philanthropist, businesswoman
- Spouse: Jeramias Dias

Patthinihennadige Warnadeepthia Kurukulasuriya Celestina Rodrigo, MBE (known as Mrs. Jeremias Dias; 11 July 1858 – 26 March 1933) was a Ceylonese philanthropist and businesswoman. She was a pioneer in the field of Buddhist Girls' education and women entrepreneurs. She was the founding patron (1917) of the premier Buddhist School for girls in Sri Lanka; Visakha Vidyalaya, located in Bambalapitiya, Colombo. and few years later Sri Sumangala Girls College, Panadura.

== Early life ==
She was born in the coastal town of Nalluruwa, Panadura to an old aristocratic family. Her father was Pattinihennadige Warnadeepthia Kurukulasuriya Salaman Rodrigo and her mother was Mahawaduge Madalena Perera. She was the third in a family of seven girls and two boys. They were proprietors of coconut property, distillers, renters and exporters of arrack, one of the few avenues open to natives for growth and enterprise during the early colonial period. They were also pioneers in the rubber and the hotel industry. The family descends from Thome Rodrigo, a prince who signed the Convention of Malvana in 1597.

== Philanthropic activities ==
Mrs Dias was known for her social service and philanthropy, which was recognized with her appointment as a Member (Civil Division) of the Order of the British Empire (MBE) in the 1929 Birthday Honours for her charitable service to Ceylon.

=== National service ===
In 1917, she established Visakha Vidyalaya, Colombo. The funds for setting up the school were derived from the profits from a rubber estate in Matugama: Good Hope Estate. Rs 100,000 was put on trust to set up the school, Rs 50,000 to acquire land and the remaining Rs 50,000 was to be used for its upkeep. She entrusted its management to the likes of D. S. Senanayake Dr. W. A. de Silva, Baron Jayatilaka and the Buddhist Theosophical Society She also built a modern laboratory for Ananda College, Colombo in 1916, which helped it to be recognized as a Grade-1 status institute of higher education and eligible for the government grant and a Sanatorium for Buddhist monks.

=== Buddhism movement and legacy ===
She was a former President of the Panadura Association and a chief patron-custodian of the Rankot Viharaya, Panadura and Vajiraramaya, Bambalapitiya. She assisted in the campaign to resurrect Buddhism in this country. The innumerable religious and social service activities initiated by her have helped a large number of organizations to fulfill their objectives. She is widely regarded as the pioneer lady/female entrepreneur and philanthropist of the island. She died on March 26, 1933.

== Personal life ==
She married Jeramias Dias of Panadura, a businessman, planter and pioneer Buddhist revivalist, who was instrumental in organizing the world-famous "Panadura Vivadaya/Debate". They had eight children; Harry, Lillian, Arthur Vincent, Edmund Wilson, Adeline, Ellen, Rosalind and Charles. After the death of her husband in 1902, she became the managing director of the business concerns of the family. The "Panadura Vivadaya/Debate" was the turning point in the Buddhist revival movement in the island, which attracted the likes of Henry Steel Olcott. What is not quite so famous is that the Wesleyan chapel was also built by the Rodrigo family and Mathaes Swaris Rodrigo Goonewardane, the churchwarden on whose land the church was built invited the parties for a debate.

Her son Arthur V. Dias and grandson Wilmot A. Perera were also famous philanthropists and activists of the Sri Lankan independence movement. She is a grandaunt of Mahesh Rodrigo and Aravinda de Silva.
