= D. C. W. Kannangara =

Sri Lankan politician (1913–1999)

Hon. D. C. W. Kannangara MP

Member of the Ceylon Parliament for Panadura
- In office 1952–1956
- Preceded by: Henry Peiris
- Succeeded by: Leslie Goonewardena

Member of the Ceylon Parliament for Bandaragama
- In office March 1960 – July 1960
- Preceded by: seat created
- Succeeded by: K. D. David Perera

Personal details
- Born: 3 June 1913
- Died: 1999
- Party: United National Party
- Spouse: Leela Wickramasinghe
- Children: 4
- Profession: politician

Don Christopher Wijesinghe Kannangara (3 June 1913 - 1999) was a prominent landowner and Ceylonese politician.

== Early life ==
Don Christopher Wijesinghe Kannangara was born on 3 June 1913, the son of D. H. R. W. Kannangara and Alice née Kotalawala. He married Leela Wickramasinghe and they had four children. His great-grandfather was Don Cornelius Wijesinghe Kannangara of Bandaragama.

== Career ==
He entered to politics under the guidance of his great-uncle Don Henry Wijesinghe Kannangara of Thalgaspitiye walawwa.

=== 1947 elections ===
At the 1st parliamentary election, held on 16 September 1947, Kannangara unsuccessfully contested the Pandura electorate as an independent candidate, receiving only 6,729 votes as opposed to the Bolshevik Samasamaja Party candidate, Henry Peiris, who won with 16,435 votes.

=== 1952 elections ===
Kannangara challenged again for the seat of Pandura at the 2nd parliamentary election held between 24 May 1952 and 30 May 1952 but this time as the United National Party candidate, defeating the incumbent Pieris by 3,856 votes.

=== 1956 elections ===
At the 1956 parliamentary elections he was defeated, like a number of United National party nominees, with Leslie Goonewardene from the Lanka Sama Samaja Party polling 29,362 votes to Kannangara's 11,032.

=== 1960 elections ===
Kannangara subsequently contested the Bandaragama electorate at the parliamentary elections in March 1960, which he won by 3,123 votes over his Sri Lanka Freedom Party rival, K. D. David Perera. However as the election left neither of the country's two major parties with a majority, another election was called. At the subsequent July election Kannangara was defeated by the Perera by 5,666 votes.

=== 1965 elections ===
Kannangara ran again at the 1965 parliamentary elections but was again defeated by Perera, this time by 3,421 votes. He stood for a fourth time at the 1970 parliamentary elections, where he lost to the Sri Lanka Freedom party candidate, Herbert Wickramasinghe, by 11,969 votes. Perera having been disqualified earlier in 1968 from running for parliament.

== Death ==
Kannangara died in June 1999.
