= Panadura Electoral District =

Electoral district of Sri Lanka

Coordinates: 6.7167°N 79.9000°E

Panadura electoral district was an electoral district of Sri Lanka between August 1947 and February 1989. The district was named after the town of Panadura in Kalutara District, Western Province. The 1978 Constitution of Sri Lanka introduced the proportional representation electoral system for electing members of Parliament. The existing 160 mainly single-member electoral districts were replaced with 22 multi-member electoral districts. Panadura electoral district was replaced by the Kalutara multi-member electoral district at the 1989 general elections, the first under the PR system, though Panadura continues to be a polling division of the multi-member electoral district.

== Members of Parliament ==
Key

Independent LSSP UNP

Election	Member	Party	Term
1947	Henry Peiris	BSP	1947-1952
1952	D. C. W. Kannangara	UNP	1952-1956
1956	Leslie Goonewardene	LSSP	1956-1960
1960	Leslie Goonewardene	LSSP	1960-1960
1960	Leslie Goonewardene	LSSP	1960-1965
1965	Leslie Goonewardene	LSSP	1965-1970
1970	Leslie Goonewardene	LSSP	1970-1977
1977	Neville Fernando	UNP	1977-1989

== Elections ==
=== 1947 Parliamentary General Election ===
Results of the 1st parliamentary election held between 23 August 1947 and 20 September 1947 for the district:

Candidate	Party	Symbol	Votes	%
Henry Peiris	Bolshevik Samasamaja Party	Lamp	16,435	43.37
Susantha de Fonseka	United National Party	Umbrella	13,889	36.65
D. C. W. Kannangara	Independent	Hand	6,729	17.76
R. E. Weeraman	Independent	Butterfly	406	1.07
Valid Votes			37,459	98.86
Rejected Votes			433	1.14
Total Polled			37,892	100.00
Registered Electors			53,479	
Turnout				70.85

=== 1952 Parliamentary General Election ===
Results of the 2nd parliamentary election held between 24 May 1952 and 30 May 1952 for the district:

Candidate	Party	Symbol	Votes	%
D. C. W. Kannangara	United National Party	Star	19,760	51.53
Henry Peiris	Bolshevik Samasamaja Party	Hand	15,904	41.48
Shelton Peiris		Lamp	1,200	3.13
K. A. R. Solomon Fernando		Elephant	1,089	2.84
Valid Votes			37,953	98.98
Rejected Votes			392	1.02
Total Polled			38,345	100.00
Registered Electors			56,528	
Turnout				67.83

=== 1956 Parliamentary General Election ===
Results of the 3rd parliamentary election held between 5 April 1956 and 10 April 1956 for the district:

Candidate	Party	Symbol	Votes	%
Leslie Goonewardene	Lanka Sama Samaja Party	Key	29,362	72.32
D. C. W. Kannangara	United National Party	Elephant	11,032	27.17
Valid Votes			40,394	99.49
Rejected Votes			206	0.51
Total Polled			40,600	100.00
Registered Electors			61,288	
Turnout				66.24

=== 1960 (March) Parliamentary General Election ===
Results of the 4th parliamentary election held on 19 March 1960 for the district:

Candidate	Party	Symbol	Votes	%
Leslie Goonewardene	Lanka Sama Samaja Party	Key	9,266	34.97
Cyril Salgado	United National Party	Elephant	6,919	26.11
Upali Dias		Sun	6,519	24.60
L. W. Kuruppu		Cockerel	2,887	10.89
Asoka Ranjit Jayatilake		Bell	469	1.77
Sirisoma Jayasinghe		Lamp	302	1.14
Valid Votes			26,362	99.48
Rejected Votes			137	0.52
Total Polled			26,499	100.00
Registered Electors			34,958	
Turnout				75.80

=== 1960 (July) Parliamentary General Election ===
Results of the 5th parliamentary election held on 20 July 1960 for the district:

Candidate	Party	Symbol	Votes	%
Leslie Goonewardene	Lanka Sama Samaja Party	Key	15,387	59.61
Cyril Salgado	United National Party	Elephant	10,309	39.94
Valid Votes			25,696	99.55
Rejected Votes			117	0.45
Total Polled			25,813	100.00
Registered Electors			34,958	
Turnout				73.84

=== 1965 Parliamentary General Election ===
Results of the 6th parliamentary election held on 22 March 1965 for the district:

Candidate	Party	Symbol	Votes	%
Leslie Goonewardene	Lanka Sama Samaja Party	Key	20,033	55.22
Jane M. de Fonseka	United National Party	Elephant	16,005	44.11
Valid Votes			36,038	99.33
Rejected Votes			243	0.77
Total Polled			36,281	100.00
Registered Electors			43,789	
Turnout				82.85

=== 1970 Parliamentary General Election ===
Results of the 7th parliamentary election held on 27 May 1970 for the district:

Candidate	Party	Symbol	Votes	%
Leslie Goonewardene	Lanka Sama Samaja Party	Key	25,218	59.41
Cyril Salgado	United National Party	Elephant	16,622	39.16
Jayasiri Hirimuthugoda		Bell	529	1.25
Valid Votes			42,369	99.81
Rejected Votes			80	0.19
Total Polled			42,449	100.00
Registered Electors			50,489	
Turnout				84.08

=== 1977 Parliamentary General Election ===
Results of the 8th parliamentary election held on 21 July 1977 for the district:

Candidate	Party	Symbol	Votes	%
Neville Fernando	United National Party	Elephant	28,677	56.15
Leslie Goonewardene	Lanka Sama Samaja Party	Key	17,546	34.35
Don Piyasena Wttasinghe	Sri Lanka Freedom Party	Hand	3,477	6.81
Jitendra Weeraman		Lamp	751	1.47
A. D. Sugathadasa		Spoon	328	0.64
S. Jinendradasa		Cartwheel	120	0.24
Valid Votes			50,899	99.66
Rejected Votes			176	0.44
Total Polled			51,075	100.00
Registered Electors			59,163	
Turnout				86.33
