= U. P. Y. Jinadasa =

Ceylonese politician (born 1911)

Udagama Pahala Yamanelegedera Jinadasa (born 26 November 1911) was a Ceylonese politician. He was the member of Parliament of Sri Lanka from Kundasale representing the Sri Lanka Freedom Party. He was defeated in the same electoral district in the 1965 general election and the 1977 general election.
