= Visakha Vidyalaya =

- විශාඛා විද්‍යාලය; விசாகா வித்தியாலயம்

Location
- Vajira Road; Colombo; Sri Lanka; 6°53′30″N 79°51′34″E

Information
- Type: National
- Motto: Pali: පඤ්ඤාය පරිසුජ්ඣති Paññāya Parisujjhati (By wisdom is one cleansed)
- Religious affiliation: Buddhist
- Established: 16 January 1917; 109 years ago
- Founder: Celestina Dias
- Principal: Manomi Senevirathne
- Staff: 300+
- Grades: Grade 1 - 13
- Gender: Girls
- Age: 6 to 19
- Enrolment: 6000+
- Language: Sinhala, English
- Colors: Gold and blue
- Alumni: Visakhians
- Website: http://www.visakhavidyalaya.lk/

Visakha Vidyalaya (Sinhala: විශාඛා විද්‍යාලය, Tamil: விசாகா வித்தியாலயம்) is a girls' school in Colombo, Sri Lanka. It is a National School managed by the central government providing primary and secondary education.

== History ==
The school was established in 1917 by Celestina Dias as the Buddhist Girls College in a house called 'The Firs' in Turret Road, Colombo, Sri Lanka. It was the dream of Dias to train the school girls according to the Buddhist moral values and principles. In 1927 it moved to its present premises in Vajira Road, Colombo and was named Visakha Vidyalaya, after Visakha, a disciple of the Lord Buddha, by Lady Herbert Stanley the wife of the Governor of Ceylon at that time. In 1939 the school was affiliated with Lady Irwin College, New Delhi to conduct courses in Home economics. Science subjects were introduced to the curriculum in 1946, for the first time in a girls' school in Sri Lanka.

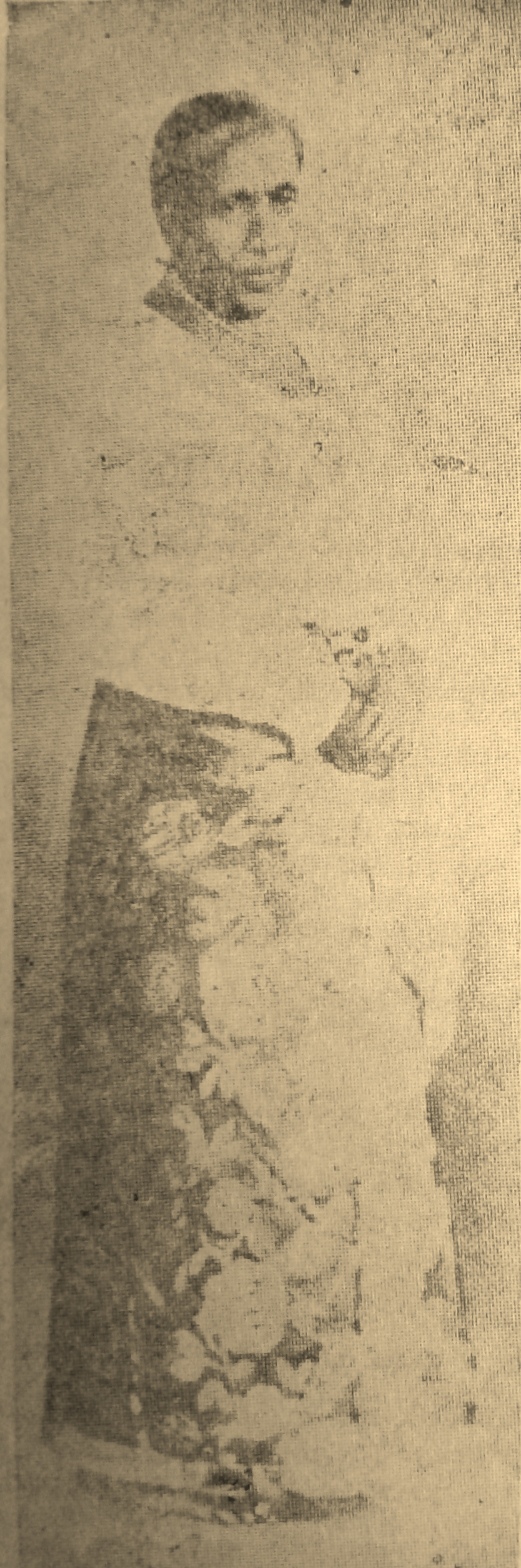
Founder Celestina Dias

== School motto ==
The school's motto is from the Alavaka Sutta in the Sutta Pitaka of the Tripitaka. When the yakkha Alavaka first confronted Buddha, he threatened to exterminate Buddha unless he, Buddha were to answer all his questions. One of the questions asked was "Kathansu Parisujjhati" (how is one cleansed) to which Buddha replied, "Paññaya Parisujjhati" (by wisdom is one cleansed).

== Houses ==
All the current house names are derived from the names of four past principals of the school, Jeremias Dias the founder of the school, and Sir Don Baron Jayatilaka, who was once the patron of the school. There are six houses at Visakha:

House Name	House Colours
Dawes	Yellow and green
Dias	Red and black
Jayatilake	Blue and yellow
Motwani	Orange and black
Pulimood	Purple and gold
Weerasooriya	Light blue and black

== Past principals ==
Name	Entered office	Departed office
Bernice T. Banning	Jan. 1917	Dec. 1917
J. Ganguli	Jan. 1918	Mar. 1920
H. Westbrook	Mar. 1920	Jan. 1921
D. C. Devereaux	Feb. 1921	May 1922
E. L. Fletcher	May 1922	May 1924
G. H. Pearse (Acting)	May 1924	May 1925
S. E. Lowe	May 1925	Sept.1926
G. H. Pearse	Sept.1926	Apr. 1933
MacDonald (Act.)	May 1933	Jun. 1933
C. L. Motwani	Jun. 1933	Apr. 1945
S. G. Pulimood	May 1945	Jul. 1967
H. S. Jayasinghe	Jul. 1967	Jun. 1983
S. E. Siriwardhana	July 1983	Dec. 1987
M. N. Edussuriya	Jan. 1988	Oct. 1999
R. M. L. Jayasekara	Oct. 1999	Nov. 2001
M. D. I. N. Siriwardhana	Nov. 2001	July 2003
R. N. Amarasinghe	July 2003	July 2007
C. R. Gunarathne	July 2007	Oct. 2008
B. M. Weerasooriya	Oct. 2008	Dec 2008
Sandamali Aviruppola	Dec. 2008	Nov. 2021
Manomi Senevirathne	Jan. 2022	present

== Notable alumni ==
- Kusala Abhayavardhana, social worker and member of parliament - Borella (1970–77)
- Senali Fonseka, actress
- Kshanika Hirimburegama, Vice-Chancellor of the University of Colombo
- Oshadie Kuruppu, Sri Lankan badminton player
- Kamini Nirmala Mendis, professor emeritus at the University of Colombo and former malaria expert at the World Health Organization
- Sachini Nipunsala, TV presenter, dancer
- Sabeetha Perera, film actress
- Sumitra Peries, filmmaker and Sri Lanka's Ambassador to France
- Hirunika Premachandra, politician
- Jayathri Samarakone, Sri Lankan High Commissioner to Singapore
- Inoka Sathyangani, film director and producer
- Ruchira Silva, fashion designer
- Deepali Wijesundera, Judge of the Court of Appeal of Sri Lanka
- Ganga Seneviratne, Sri Lankan national swimmer
- Yohani de Silva, singer

== See also ==
- Education in Sri Lanka
