= Leslie Goonewardene =

Sri Lankan politician

The Honourable Leslie Goonewardene
- ලෙස්ලි ගුනවර්ධන
- Goonewardene in the 1970s

General Secretary of the Lanka Sama Samaja Party
- In office 18 December 1935 – 1977
- Preceded by: Position established
- Succeeded by: Colvin R. de Silva

Minister of Transport
- In office 1970–1975
- Prime Minister: Sirimavo Bandaranaike
- Preceded by: E. L. B. Hurulle
- Succeeded by: K. B. Ratnayake

Minister of Communications
- In office 1970–1977
- Prime Minister: Sirimavo Bandaranaike
- Preceded by: Montague Jayawickrama
- Succeeded by: Shelton Jayasinghe

Member of the Ceylonese Parliament for Panadura
- In office 1956–1977
- Preceded by: D. C. W. Kannangara
- Succeeded by: Neville Fernando

Personal details
- Born: 31 October 1909 Panadura, Ceylon
- Died: 11 April 1983 (aged 73) Colombo
- Party: Lanka Sama Samaja Party
- Other political affiliations: Bolshevik–Leninist Party of India, Ceylon and Burma
- Spouse: Vivienne Goonewardene (m. 1939)
- Relations: Cholomondeley Goonewardene (cousin); Selestina Rodrigo (aunt); Thome Rodrigo
- Children: Kumundu; Ajit Surendra; Premilla
- Education: St. John's College, Panadura; S. Thomas' College, Mount Lavinia; London School of Economics
- Occupation: Independence activist; politician; statesman; philanthropist
- Ethnicity: Sinhalese

Leslie Simon Goonewardene (Sinhala: ලෙස්ලි සයිමන් ගුනවර්ධන, Tamil: லெஸ்லி சைமன் குணவர்தன; 31 October 1909 – 11 April 1983) was a prominent Sri Lankan statesman. He founded Sri Lanka's first political party, the Lanka Sama Samaja Party, in 1935, and served as its General-Secretary from 1935 to 1977. Goonewardene was a key figure in both the Indian independence movement and the Sri Lankan independence movement. He was designated as a National Hero of Sri Lanka for his leadership in the independence movement, and his efforts are celebrated each year on the Sri Lankan Independence Day.

Born into an aristocratic Panaduran family, Goonewardene was brought up Methodist, educated in English-medium schools, and spoke Sinhala as well as English. Goonewardene was shaped by the widespread Marxist teachings of the time, notably conflicting with his own privilege, resulting in him pursuing the study of government from the London School of Economics. There, he was deeply influenced by the teachings of his professor, Harold Laski. Upon his return to Ceylon from London, Goonewardene founded the Lanka Sama Samaja Party in 1935. He rose to prominence leading the party through World War II, when it was key to the anti-war movement, culminating in its proscription and his escape from Ceylon to India.

In India, he founded the Bolshevik–Leninist Party of India, which was a revolutionary Trotskyist party, campaigning for independence and socialism in South Asia. He was a significant figure in the Quit India Movement alongside Mahatma Gandhi, leading to India's independence from Britain in 1947. In 1948, Ceylon followed. From the 1940s to 1960s, the Lanka Sama Samaja Party was Sri Lanka's main opposition party. Through this, Goonewardene attempted to reform the former British colony of Ceylon into a socialist republic by nationalising organisations in the banking, education, industry, media, and trade sectors. In the 1960s, the party led the United Front coalition, and through their election landslide brought the first female head of state to power. Whilst initially declining a cabinet position, by 1970 Goonewardene believed he could implement his views best through a coalition government and brought about the United Front government. Goonewardene's government was elected that year with an overwhelming majority, leading to his taking up senior cabinet roles. During this time, he was an active critic of the nationalist Sinhala Only Act.

Goonewardene remained a key figure in the Non-Aligned Movement and the Fourth International, past his retirement in 1977 and until his death in 1983. Despite being one of the largest landowners in Sri Lanka through inheritance, by his death he had pledged all of his wealth to charitable organisations. In the 1950s, he had also led the re-introduction of inheritance tax to Sri Lanka, despite the opposition of wealthy established parliamentarians.

== Early life and family ==
Leslie Goonewardene as a young adult with his family, pictured at the centre with his father, Dr. Andrew Simon Goonewardene.

Goonewardene was born on 31 October 1909 in Panadura, south-western Ceylon, to the wealthy Goonewardene family, which was active in local colonial-era politics. He was the son of Andrew Simon Goonewardene, a reputed doctor who served as President of the Panadura Maha Jana Sabha and chairman of the Urban Council. The Goonewardene family were major proprietors of coconut property. Goonewardene's mother died when he was a toddler. She was from the well-known Fernando family of 'Whitehall' Katana, one of the wealthiest families in Ceylon, privately owning very significant amounts of land. Leslie inherited all the wealth from his mother and, as his eldest son, a major share from his father. This wealth allowed Leslie to serve as a major party (LSSP) financier in his later life. His grand-aunt Selestina Rodrigo and another relative Jeramias Dias were the chief sponsors of the Panadura Ronkoth Viharaya and the reputed Panadura Vivadaya debate. Their ancestor Thome Rodrigo was a prince who was a signatory to the Malvana Convention in 1597. As traditional chiefs of the area their ancestors had played a role in defeating Arya Chakrawarti's fleet at Panadura.

=== Religious beliefs and the Methodist Church ===
Though in adulthood Goonewardene did not have any religious beliefs, as a boy he was influenced by the ideas of John Wesley. The Methodists were reputed for their contribution in the campaigns to abolish slavery and to make education more accessible, and in the Temperance Movement. Goonewardene's family were prominent figures of the Methodist Church of Ceylon, and his father was a lay preacher and treasurer of the Home Mission Fund.

The consecration of the Panadura Wesleyan Chapel, funded by Goonewardene's grandfather, Mathes Swaris Rodrigo Goonewardene on 6 March 1861.

=== The Panadura debate ===
The "Panadura debate" (පානදුරාවාදය) was the final debate defending Buddhism against the arguments of the Christian missionaries. The cause for the debate arose when Rev. David de Silva, at the request of Goonewardene's grandfather, Mathes Swaris Rodrigo Goonewardene, delivered a sermon on the soul at the Wesleyan Chapel in Panadura on 12 June 1873. Mathes had funded and helped build the chapel. The Buddhist orator Gunananda Thera delivered a sermon a week later criticizing the points raised by de Silva. Following Thera's sermon, Mathes Swaris invited the respective parties for a debate, one that served as a pivotal moment in Sinhalese history. Both parties signed an agreement on 24 July 1873 to hold another debate at Panadura. The debate was held on 24 and 26 August 1873 with a wide array of philosophical topics. The impact of the debate was phenomenal, both locally and internationally. Locally, it was the principal factor behind reviving the identity and pride of Sinhala Buddhists. Internationally, it was instrumental in raising awareness of Buddhism in the West.

== Education and raising a family ==
As a young child, Goonewardene was educated at St. John's College, Panadura and S. Thomas' College, Mount Lavinia; S. Thomas' is considered to be the most prestigious school in Ceylon, with notable alumni including four former prime ministers of Sri Lanka. Goonewardene's father, Andrew Simon Goonewardene, later sent him to a public (in the British sense of the term) boarding school, Rydal School, in north Wales with the aim of making him a Methodist priest. Instead, Goonewardene became influenced by the widespread Marxist teachings of the time, notably conflicting with his own privilege. This was a major factor leading him to pursue a BSc degree in economics from the London School of Economics, where he was shaped by the teachings of his professor, Harold Laski. He was admitted to the bar at Gray's Inn, one of the four Inns of Court in London, in 1933 but never practised law.

=== Vivienne Goonewardene ===
Leslie as a young adult

Goonewardene met Vivienne Goonatilleka, who was the niece of two of the leading leftist politicians in Ceylon, at a political meeting. Her uncle Philip Gunawardena was the "Father of Socialism" in Ceylon, and another uncle, Robert Gunawardena, was a prominent Sri Lankan politician and diplomat. Vivienne's father, Don Alanson Goonatilleka, was a pro-monarchy conservative who believed in the continuous British governing of Ceylon. Vivienne was educated at Musaeus College in Ceylon and was initially drawn to politics through the Suriya-Mal Movement in 1933, when nationalist anti-imperialists initiated the sale of the native Suriya (Portia tree) flowers as an alternative to the British colonial-symbolizing poppies. The movement had the bold slogan of "against slavery and poverty and for freedom and prosperity". As head girl she recruited her entire school to this cause.

The two intended to wed, but Vivienne's father was against the relationship because Goonewardene was a Christian, from the minority Karava caste and a revolutionary under surveillance. She was kept a virtual prisoner at home, and Goonewardene was forced to file a habeas corpus writ, a recourse in law through which a person can report an unlawful detention or imprisonment to a court, to get her released.

During the legal battle, they were notably represented by their attorney, the future President and Prime Minister of Sri Lanka J. R. Jayewardene. The couple were married on 30 January 1939.

== Early political career ==
=== Foundation of the LSSP ===
Goonewardene as General Secretary of the LSSP

Goonewardene returned to Ceylon from Britain in 1933 and helped found the Lanka Sama Samaja Party (LSSP) on 18 December 1935. It was created with the broad aims of independence from British rule and socialism by a group of young people who had gathered together for that purpose. The group at the commencement numbered six, composed principally of students who had, like Goonewardene, returned from abroad, influenced deeply by the ideas of Karl Marx and Lenin. Goonewardene founded the LSSP alongside N.M. Perera and Colvin R. de Silva, as well as Philip Gunawardena and Robert Gunawardena. Goonewardene was the LSSP's first General-Secretary and served in that role from 1935 to 1977. The party, with the aid of the South Colombo Youth League, initiated various strikes with the aim to disrupt. One such took place at the Wellawatte Spinning and Weaving Mills. Goonewardene also published a Sinhala-language journal, Kamkaruwa (The Worker), allowing the party to become involved in the 1933 Suriya-Mal Movement, whose aim was to generate financial support for indigenous (Ceylonese) veterans through the sale of native Suriya flowers. The Suriya-Mal Movement gained international coverage, propelled by the fact that Poppy Day-raised funds went solely to British ex-servicemen, despite the funds being raised abroad. The Suriya-Mal Movement also helped contribute to the poor and needy during the 1934–1935 Ceylonese malaria epidemic, which took a toll on poorer communities.

With the outbreak of the Second World War, the party was re-established underground, a necessity due to its vocal anti-war stance, opposing that of the British war effort. Members of the party, including two State Council members, as well as others in its leadership—including N.M. Perera, Philip Gunawardena and Colvin R. de Silva—were arrested and jailed, but Goonewardene evaded arrest and went underground.

=== The Bolshevik–Leninist Party of India, Ceylon and Burma ===
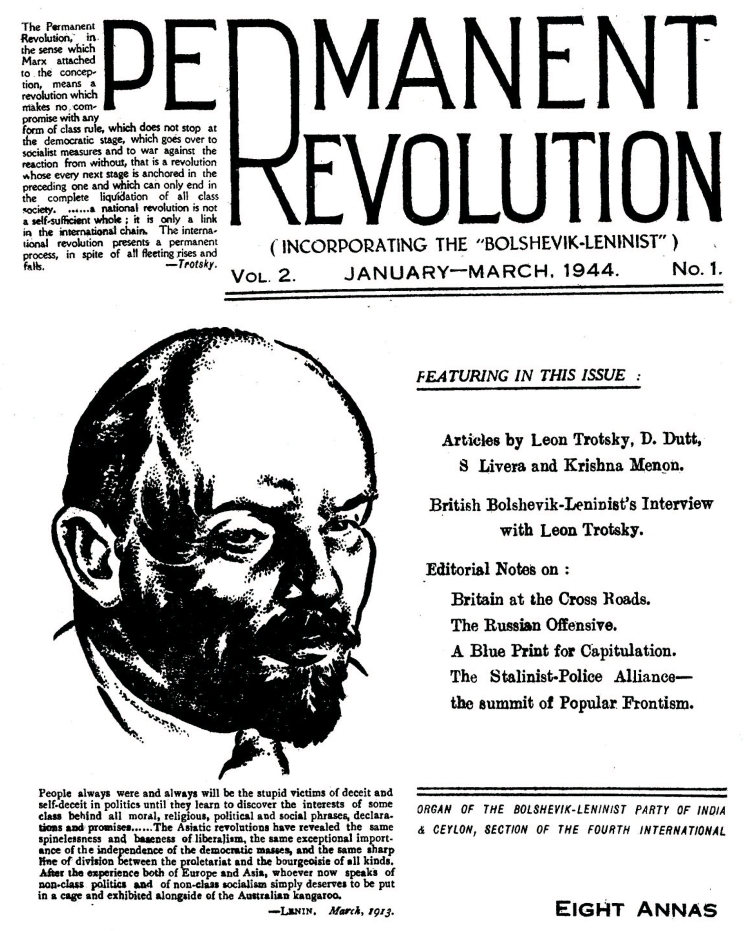
Bolshevik–Leninist Party of India, Ceylon and Burma

Though Philip Gunawardena, N.M. Perera, Edmund Samarakkody, and Colvin R. de Silva were detained in Ceylon, Goonewardene and his wife Vivienne were able to escape to India, but Goonewardene's properties were seized. They settled in Calcutta and established networks with the local Trotskyist organisations, including that of the Uttar Pradesh Trotskyist group, as well as groups in Bombay and Madras. Through discussion, the Indian and Ceylonese Trotskyists led by Goonewardene established a preliminary committee for the formation of the Bolshevik–Leninist Party of India, Ceylon and Burma (BLPI for short).

The discussions for this took place through underground meetings in Kandy in December 1940 and March 1941 and set the stage for a sole Trotskyist party for India. An underground conference was held on 20 April 1941, attended by 42 delegates. Goonewardene, whilst evading the colonial authorities, led the conference at which the Lanka Sama Samaja Party conceived a new constitution and manifesto, both of which were accepted by the delegates. The meetings in 1940 and 1941 were also attended by the other detained LSSP leaders, who had been aided by their imprisoner; the imprisoner later helped them escape their prison on 7 April 1942. The BLPI was formed in May 1942 and was approved by the Fourth International. Through this, the now-public BLPI, fronted by Goonewardene, S.C.C. Anthonipillai, Robert Gunawardena, William de Silva, and V. Karalasingham, focused on continuing strike waves that had begun in May 1941. These continued through 1942 and 1944.

Initially, during World War II, the Goonewardene-led BLPI remained relatively small—a large contrast to the high expectations of a subcontinent-wide political revolutionary party. Whilst the BLPI's full name, the Bolshevik–Leninist Party of India, Ceylon and Burma, suggests that it also represented Burma, there was arguably no party representation there. The BLPI, however, found later success, launching Spark, its party publication issued in the party's base of Calcutta. Due to political suppression, the publication was moved to Bombay and its name was changed to New Spark. They published Trotsky's open letter to the Indian workers and other pieces. Leslie Goonewardene was a key contributor to the party publications, writing under the pseudonym, K. Tilak. During the remainder of World War II, the BLPI was able to influence the trade union and student movements in several cities. Significant membership was recorded among tramway workers, as well as workers of the Buckingham and Carnatic Mills.

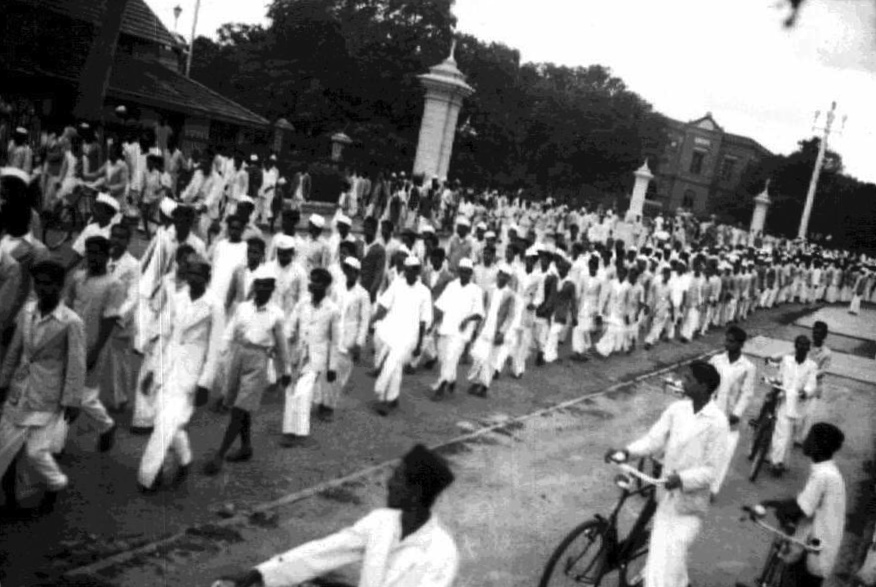
Quit India procession in Bangalore

=== Quit India Movement ===
From April 1942, Goonewardene primarily focused his efforts on the Quit India Movement, a movement with the demand to end the British Rule of India. He remained uncaptured throughout the war years both in Ceylon and India. In 1953, Goonewardene also sheltered Jeanne Hoban from the authorities when she was threatened with deportation for organising plantation workers unions. Following the Quit India Movement, hope was rife among the South-Asian socialist leaders. Goonewardene, under the pseudonym K. Tilak, wrote that the "young Bolshevik-Leninist Party ... now faces its first real chance for expansion ... The situation is changing and without doubt, of all of the parties and political groups in India, the BLPI is the one which is going to gain the most in this change."

==== Initial party split ====
Towards the end of World War II the LSSP split into two: a LSSP faction led by N.M. Perera and Philip Gunawardena; and the Bolshevik Samasamaja Party (BSP), the Ceylonese arm of the BLPI, led by Goonewardene, Colvin R. de Silva, Edmund Samarakkody, and Bernard Soysa. The BSP and LSSP merged in 1950.

== Return to Sri Lanka ==
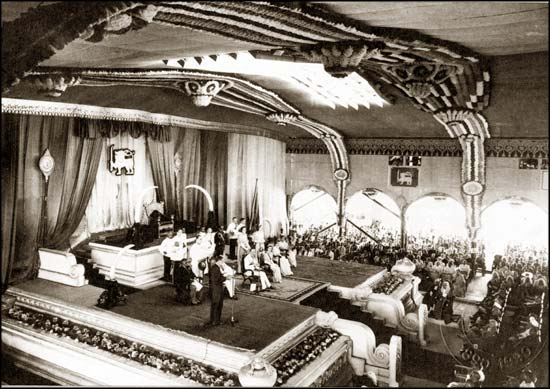
The formal ceremony marking the start of self-rule, with the opening of the first parliament at Independence Square by Prince Henry, Duke of Gloucester in the presence of Rt Hon D.S. Senanayake as first Prime Minister of Ceylon.

=== Independence ===
Following the end of the war, the LSSP's proscription ended, and Leslie was able to return to Ceylon to work further on the independence movement. The Lanka Sama Samaja Party led Sri Lankan independence movement succeeded when, on 4 February 1948, Ceylon was granted independence as the Dominion of Ceylon. Dominion status within the British Commonwealth was retained for the next 24 years until 22 May 1972, when it became a republic and was renamed the Democratic Socialist Republic of Sri Lanka.

=== Electoral beginnings ===
Goonewardene stood as the LSSP's candidate for Colombo North at the 1952 parliamentary election but was defeated by the United National Party candidate Cyril E. S. Perera. He stood as the LSSP's candidate for Panadura at the 1956 parliamentary election. He won the election and entered Parliament. He was re-elected at the March 1960, July 1960, 1965 and 1970 parliamentary elections.

== Growth of the Lanka Sama Samaja Party ==
From the late 1940s to 1960s, the Lanka Sama Samaja Party served as the opposition Party in Sri Lanka, whilst being recognised as the Sri Lankan wing of the Fourth International, an organisation characterised by Trotskyism and Anti-Stalinism. Through this, Goonewardene attempted to reform the former British Colony of Ceylon into a socialist republic by nationalising organisations in the banking, education, industry, media, and trade sectors. In 1959, despite being one of the largest landowners in Sri Lanka through inheritance, Goonewardene re-introduced inheritance tax to the country, despite the opposition of wealthy established parliamentarians.

With its increased popularity, the LSSP was looking to grow. In 1964, the party held a conference in which the majority of delegates nominated the classification of the Sri Lanka Freedom Party (SLFP), a petty bourgeois party, leaving the prospects of a coalition with it. Goonewardene and Colvin R. de Silva were opposed to this decision, but they remained with the LSSP. Another group, led by Edmund Samarakkody and Bala Tampoe, split from Goonewardene's party to form the Revolutionary Lanka Sama Samaja Party. Later in 1964, the LSSP formed a coalition with Sirimavo Bandaranaike, the first female prime minister in the world, who had until then formally governed with a minority, missing one seat for majority. This principal change led to the LSSP being expelled from the Fourth International, with the Revolutionary Lanka Sama Samaja Party taking its place. Following the election, Goonewardene alongside Colvin R. de Silva declined to accept cabinet office.

The coalition government fell in 1965 due to the desertion of several members. However, the number of votes won by the LSSP increased at the general election held that year. After the election, supporters of the party were subjected to a period of co-ordinated victimisation by the new seven-party coalition led by the UNP. In 1968, Goonewardene orchestrated the LSSP joining the SLFP and the Communist Party of Sri Lanka (CPSL) in a United Front. That year's joint May Day rally was said to be the biggest ever to take place in Sri Lanka.

== Lanka Sama Samaja Government (1970–1975) ==
The second Bandaranaike Cabinet, with Colvin R. de Silva and Goonewardene shown.

By 1970, Goonewardene believed he could implement his views best through the SLFP coalition and joined the SLFP-led United Front government. That year, the United Front, made up of the SLFP, LSSP and its rival, the Communist Party of Sri Lanka, was elected to power in landslide. The LSSP had 18 MPs in the House of Representatives. Goonewardene became Minister of Communications and Minister of Transport. By July, he had worked to convene a Constitutional Assembly to replace the British-drafted constitution with one drafted by the Ceylonese. Policies requiring that permanent secretaries in the government ministries have expertise in their division were introduced. For example, those serving in the Ministry of Housing had to be trained engineers, and those serving in the Ministry of Health, medical practitioners. All government employees were allowed to join Workers Councils and at the local level, People's Committees were established to allow input from the population at large on government administration; this was brought from the LSSP management structure. The changes were intended to remove elements of British colonisation and foreign influence from the country's institutions.

Facing budget deficits of $195 million—caused by rising energy and food-importation costs and declining revenue from coconut, rubber, and tea exports—the government attempted to centralise the economy and implement price controls. Goonewardene and other party members pressed Sirimavo Bandaranaike to nationalise the foreign banks of British, Indian, and Pakistani origin, an act that would impact the need for credit. During this period, the United Front government officially granted recognition to other socialist nations, notably including East Germany, North Korea, North Vietnam, and the National Liberation Front of South Vietnam.

Goonewardene supported the government stance opposing the development of an Anglo-US communications centre in the Indian Ocean, maintaining that the area should be a "neutral, nuclear-free zone". In December, the Business Undertaking Acquisition Act was passed, allowing the state to nationalise any business with more than 100 employees. Ostensibly, the move aimed to reduce foreign control of key tea and rubber production, but it stunted both domestic and foreign investment in industry and development.

Despite the efforts of Goonewardene and other leftist elements of the government to address the country's economic problems, unemployment and inflation remained unchecked. After 16 months in power, the United Front government was almost toppled by the 1971 Janatha Vimukthi Peramuna Insurrection of militant left-wing youths. Contrary to the LSSP, the JVP believed that socialism would be best implemented militarily. Though aware of the militant stance of the Janatha Vimukthi Peramuna (People's Liberation Front), the administration initially failed to recognise them as an imminent threat, dismissing them as idealists. On 6 March, militants attacked the U.S. Embassy in Colombo, leading to the declaration of a state of emergency on 17 March. In early April, attacks on police stations evidenced a well-planned insurgency that Ceylon's small army was ill-equipped to handle. Calling on its allies for assistance, the government was saved largely because of the LSSP's neutral foreign policy and Goonewardene's long-term stance as a member of the "Non-Aligned Movement". The Soviet Union sent aircraft to support the Ceylonese government; arms and equipment came from Britain, the United Arab Republic, the United States, and Yugoslavia; medical supplies were provided by East and West Germany, Norway, and Poland; patrol boats were sent from India; and both India and Pakistan sent troops. On 1 May, the government suspended their offensives and offered an amnesty, which resulted in thousands of surrenders. The following month a second amnesty was offered. One of the nation's first actions after the conflict was to expel North Korean diplomats, as it was suspected they had fomented the radical discontent.

In May 1972, Ceylon was replaced by the Republic of Sri Lanka after a new constitution was ratified. Though the country remained within the Commonwealth of Nations, Queen Elizabeth II was no longer recognised as its sovereign. Under its terms, the senate, suspended since 1971, was officially abolished, and the new unicameral National State Assembly was created, combining the powers of the executive, judicial, and legislative branches in one authority. The constitution recognised the supremacy of Buddhism, though it guaranteed equal protection to Buddhism, Christianity, Hinduism, and Islam. Despite the efforts of Goonewardene, it failed to provide a charter of inalienable rights, recognised Sinhala as the only official language, and contained no "elements of federalism". The Sinhala Only Act was vocally opposed to by Goonewardene in parliament. During this period, the government enacted land redistribution programmes to establish farming cooperatives and limit the size of privately held lands.

The 1973 oil crisis had a traumatic effect on the Sri Lankan economy. Still dependent on foreign assistance, goods, and monetary aid from Australia, Canada, China, Denmark, Hungary, and the World Bank, the government eased the austerity programmes that limited importation of consumer goods. The United States terminated aid grants, which required no repayment, and changed to a policy of providing foreign loans. Devaluation of the Sri Lankan rupee, coupled with inflation and high taxes, slowed economic growth, consequently creating cyclical pressure to address deficits with even higher taxes and austerity measures. Uncontrolled inflation between 1973 and 1974 led to economic uncertainty and public dissatisfaction. In 1974, Bandaranaike forced the shutdown of the last independent newspaper group, The Sun, believing their criticism was fuelling unrest. This, along with other factors, led to fissures appearing in the United Front coalition, largely resulting from the Lanka Sama Samaja Party's continued influence on trade unions and threats of strike actions throughout 1974 and 1975. When newly confiscated estates were placed under the Ministry of Agriculture and Lands, controlled by the Lanka Sama Samaja Party, fears that they would unionise plantation workers led Bandaranaike to oust them from the government coalition.

Despite later fissures, Goonewardene was able to advance parts of the party programme considerably: foreign-owned plantations were nationalised, local ownership was restricted, democratically elected workers' councils were established in state corporations and government departments under the purview of its ministries (and of that of a sympathiser, T.B. Subasinghe), and measures were taken that narrowed the gap between the rich and poor. The Congress of Samasamaja Youth Leagues and other bodies affiliated to the party (membership of the party proper was still restricted to a small cadre, on a Leninist model) saw unprecedented growth at this time. The leadership looked to Salvador Allende's Chile as a model of revolution through parliamentary means. During this period, Goonewardene established contact with the captains of the Movement of the Armed Forces (Movimento das Forças Armadas or MFA) of Portugal, after the Carnation Revolution of April 1974; he also became a theoretician of Eurocommunism and its application to Sri Lanka, writing a pamphlet titled "Can we get to socialism this way?".

=== Minister of Transport (1970–75) ===
After the 1970 election, at which the United Front (UF) won a landslide victory, the workers at the Ceylon Transport Board spontaneously established workers' committees and took over the running of the institution. This period began the most successful years of the CTB as an institution. For the last two of the five years that Goonewardene was there, the CTB ran at a profit, whilst providing a service that was never previously or subsequently matched. In addition to his role in the management of the Employees' Councils, a council of which the workers' committees were transformed into after being properly constituted, commuter organisations were included in an advisory role. The services were expanded and measures were taken to improve efficiency, including rationalising bus types. The CTB started buying buses from Isuzu to offset any cartelisation by Tata and Ashok Leyland, the main suppliers, and also purchased Ikarus buses from Hungary. Several new bus stands and bus depots were established. A modern, multi-storied bus station was planned at the Central Bus Station, complete with hotel and cinema, but was never completed. Goonewardene also took measures to build up local industry, and the CTB became well equipped with foundries and workshops: the central workshop at Werahera became the largest in South Asia. The local modification of ticket machines was started after employees pointed out many unsuitable features and other employees were found tampering with the machines; a new workshop was acquired for this scheme of modification. In 1974 he started the assembly of bus chassis, and prototypes of a locally manufactured bus and a car rolled out of Werahera. In the 1971 Janatha Vimukthi Peramuna (JVP) insurrection, members of the CTB formed a 2,000-strong paramilitary body, the Hansa Regiment, from the employees of the CTB to guard bus depots, bus stops, and workshops. They also formed CANTAB, a secret intelligence organisation, the agents of whom were employees of the CTB, which provided accurate reports of the strength and distribution of JVP units.

==== The rail network ====
At the time of Goonewardene's entry into office, most of the railways were developed during the British colonial period, with the first line (from Colombo to Kandy) opened on 26 April 1867. The railway had been introduced as an economical means of transporting goods produced on the tea, rubber, and coconut plantations to the main port in Colombo. After the 1950s the Sri Lankan economy became focused on industry rather than plantation agriculture. During Goonewardene's time in office, the road network grew exponentially to ensure easy transition to an industrialising nation; with the introduction of lorries, a faster means of transporting goods, the amount of goods transported by rail declined.

The rail served as a major challenge for Goonewardene. Its network was more focused on plantation areas than on population and service centres, and the move to industrialisation meant that the railways generated large losses. To counteract this, Goonewardene extended the coastal line from Puttalam to Aruvakalu in 1974 to serve the cement factory there.

=== Minister of Communication (1970–77) ===
In February 1971, India withdrew landing and overflying rights of Pakistani planes after the hijacking and later blowing up of an Indian plane at Lahore. Sri Lanka, under Goonewardene, granted Pakistan International Airlines (PIA) the aforementioned rights at the request of the Pakistani government. During the months of March and April, PIA planes made over 140 refuelling landings in Katunaye International Airport. In March 1971, the Pakistani Air Force had 16 eastbound and 15 westbound military aircraft touch down. These were of major significance as there were serious strains in relationship between East and West Pakistan at the time. Goonewardene insisted that the flights only took place when the Awmi League leader, Mujibur Rahman, was involved in negotiations with the government of Pakistan, emphasising that there were "practically no flights other than scheduled flights" from March through September, and denied that the Government of Sri Lanka was complicit in helping the transport of troops from West Pakistan to East Pakistan.

=== End of United Front Alliance ===
Fissures appeared in the United Front coalition, largely resulting from the LSSP's continued influence on trade unions and threats of strike actions throughout 1974 and 1975. When newly confiscated estates were placed under the Ministry of Agriculture and Lands, controlled by the LSSP, fears that they would unionise plantation workers led Prime Minister Bandaranaike to oust them from the government coalition. On 2 September 1975 all LSSP ministers in the government, including Goonewardene, were dismissed, and the United Front was dismantled. He was finally defeated in the 1977 parliamentary election by United National Party candidate Dr Neville Fernando in the Panadura electorate.

== Other political acts ==
In the 1940s and 1950s, the LSSP and other leftist parties had led the opposition to the communal politics of successive governments. Goonewardene strongly opposed the Sinhala Only Act introduced by the SLFP government in 1956 and was chief among the Sinhalese and Marxist politicians to do so. During the parliamentary debate on the act, Goonewardene prophetically observed that:

"There is a grave danger, if those people the Tamils, feel that a grave and irreparable injustice is done to them. There is a possibility of their deciding even to break away from the rest of the country."

— Leslie Goonewardene

The Sinhala Only Act, opposed by Goonewardene, helped lead to the Sri Lankan Civil War. Goonewardene stood for re-election at the 1977 parliamentary election but was defeated by UNP candidate Neville Fernando.

== Legacy ==
Goonewardene died on 11 April 1983. A vast procession was held around the city, followed by thousands of mourners. Goonewardene was designated as a National Hero of Sri Lanka for his leadership in the independence movement, and his efforts are celebrated each year on the Sri Lankan Independence Day. The Sri Lanka Postal Service commemorated him, and he was featured on a 5-rupee commemorative stamp. His first cousin Cholomondeley Goonewardene was also a prominent LSSPer. Another first cousin was E.G. (Eardley) Goonewardena, a senior member of the Ceylon Civil Service and later Permanent Secretary to a number of ministries as well as the Prime Minister, and first to hold the position of Secretary to the office of the President of Sri Lanka. Despite being one of the largest landowners in Sri Lanka through inheritance, by his death he had pledged all of his wealth to charitable organisations.

== Electoral history ==
Electoral history of Leslie Goonewardene
Election	Constituency	Party	Votes	Result
1952 parliamentary	Colombu North	Lanka Sama Samaja Party	7,136	Not elected
1956 parliamentary	Panadura	Lanka Sama Samaja Party	29,362	Elected
March 1960 parliamentary	Panadura	Lanka Sama Samaja Party	9,266	Elected
July 1960 parliamentary	Panadura	Lanka Sama Samaja Party	15,387	Elected
1965 parliamentary	Panadura	Lanka Sama Samaja Party	20,033	Elected
1970 parliamentary	Panadura	Lanka Sama Samaja Party	25,218	Elected
1977 parliamentary	Panadura	Lanka Sama Samaja Party	17,546	Not elected

== Authored books ==
Goonewardene wrote a number of books, sometimes using the pseudonyms K. Tilak and V.S. Parthasarathi:

- From the First to the Fourth International (1944)
- The Rise and Fall of the Comintern (1947) - inspired by World Revolution by C.L.R. James.
- Open Letter to Socialist Party Members: The Coming Crisis in the Socialist Party (1947)
- The Differences Between Trotskyism and Stalinism (1954)
- What We Stand For (1959)
- Short History of the Lanka Sama Samaja Party (1960)

Political offices
Preceded by Position Created	Secretary General of the Lanka Sama Samaja Party; 1935–1977	Succeeded by Colvin R. de Silva
Preceded by E. L. B. Hurulle	Cabinet Minister of Transport; 1970–1975	Succeeded by K. B. Ratnayake
Preceded by Montague Jayawickrama	Cabinet Minister of Communications; 1970–1977	Succeeded by Shelton Jayasinghe
