= Neville Fernando =

Sri Lankan politician (1931–2021)

Dr. Neville Fernando

Member of Parliament for Panadura
- In office 1977–1989

Personal details
- Born: 9 March 1931
- Died: 4 February 2021 (aged 89) Infectious Diseases Hospital, Angoda, Sri Lanka
- Party: United National Party; Sri Lanka Freedom Party
- Education: Sri Sumangala Girls' School Panadura

Dr. Sirikkaththuge Neville Arthur Fernando (9 March 1931 - 4 February 2021) was a Sri Lankan doctor and a politician.

== Career ==
He was elected to Panadura in the 8th parliamentary election in 1977. He was notable for having moved a controversial Motion of no confidence against then Leader of Opposition A. Amirthalingam,in July 23, 1981. It became the first motion of no confidence against a leader of opposition in the world.

Dr. Fernando built a teaching hospital in Malabe and later donated it to the government.

Dr Nevil Fernando built an education institute of Royal college panadura and Agamathi balika vidyalaya panadura schools.

== Death ==
Dr. Fernando died on 4 February 2021, in Colombo from complications from COVID-19, after being diagnosed with the disease during the COVID-19 pandemic in Sri Lanka.
