= Panadura =

Panadura පානදුර பாணந்துறை
- City
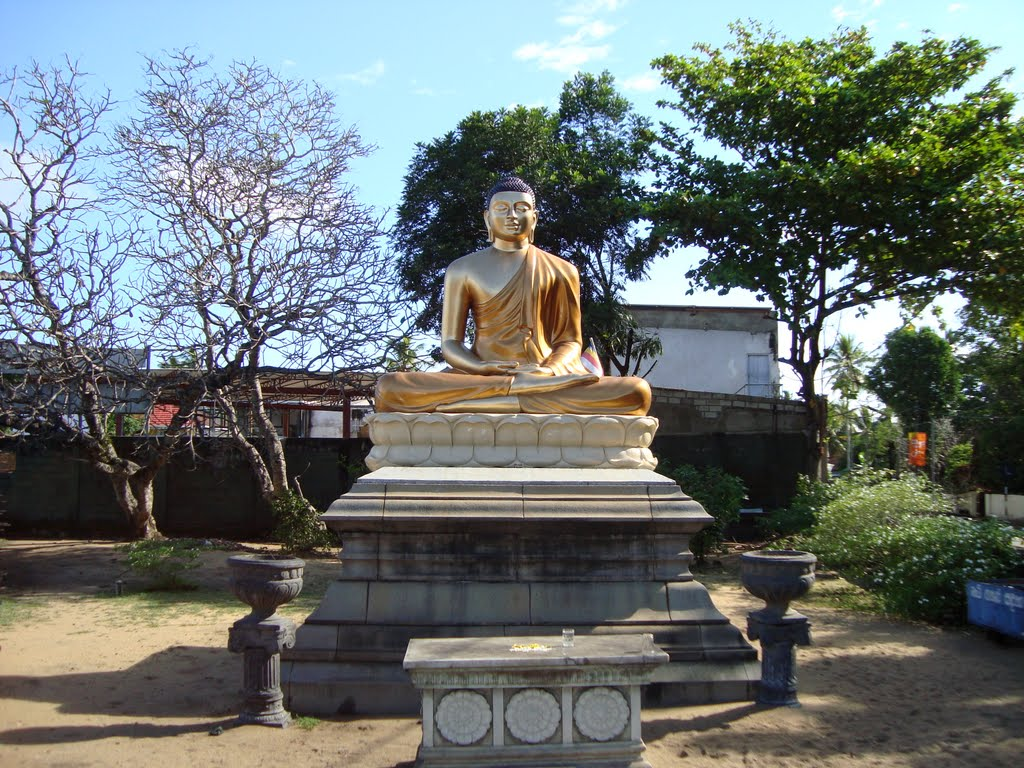

- Seal

- Location within Sri Lanka
- Coordinates: 06°42′48″N 79°54′15″E
- Country: Sri Lanka
- Province: Western Province
- District: Kalutara District
- Division: Panadura Division

Government
  - Type: Local Government
  - Body: Panadura Urban Council
  - Chairman: L. R. Hemakumara Perera, (NPP).

Area
  - City: 7.00 km^{2} (2.70 sq mi)
  - Urban: 7.00 km^{2} (2.70 sq mi)
  - Metro: 44.00 km^{2} (16.99 sq mi)

Population
  - Urban: 30,069
  - Urban density: 4,296/km^{2} (11,130/sq mi)
  - Metro: 182,285
  - Metro density: 4,143/km^{2} (10,730/sq mi)

Language
  - Official: Sinhala
  - Additional: English
- Time zone: UTC+5:30 (Time in Sri Lanka)
  - Summer (DST): UTC+5:30 (not observed)
- Postal Code: 12500
- Area code: 038

Panadura (Sinhala: පානදුර, romanized: Pānadura; Tamil: பாணந்துறை, romanized: Pāṇantuṟai) is a city in the Kalutara District, Western Province in Sri Lanka. It is located approximately 25 km (16 mi) south of Colombo.

Panadura was an electoral district in Sri Lanka until 1989 and is surrounded all sides by water through the Indian Ocean and the Bolgoda Lake. Panadura is famed as the location of important events in the Buddhist revival movement of Sri Lanka and Panadura beach is an attractive destination for locals and foreign tourists.

== Panadura Debate ==
The Panadura Debate, held in 1873, was the climax of the first phase of the Buddhist revivalist movement which began with the establishment of the Society for the Propagation of Buddhism at Kotahena and the establishment of the Lankopakara Press in Galle. The two key persons in the Panadura Debate were Migettuwatte Gunananda Thera and Father David de Silva, and the two key institutions were the Rankoth Viharaya and the Methodist Church of Panadura. It was the success of the Panadura Debate that prompted Colonel Henry Steel Olcott to come to Ceylon.

== Demographics ==
Panadura is predominantly a Sinhalese city. Buddhism is the largest religion in this city and others include Sri Lanka Moors, Burgher and Sri Lankan Tamils.

=== Ethnicity in Panadura ===
Ethnicity in Panadura (2012)
Population	Percent
Sinhalese	84.63%
Muslims	14.12%
Sri Lankan Tamils	0.67%
Indian Tamils	0.14%
Others	0.44%

Source:statistics.gov.lk.

== Transport ==
=== Road ===
Pandura is located at the junction of the A2 (Galle Road) and the A8 (Panadura-Ratnapura Road).

=== Rail ===
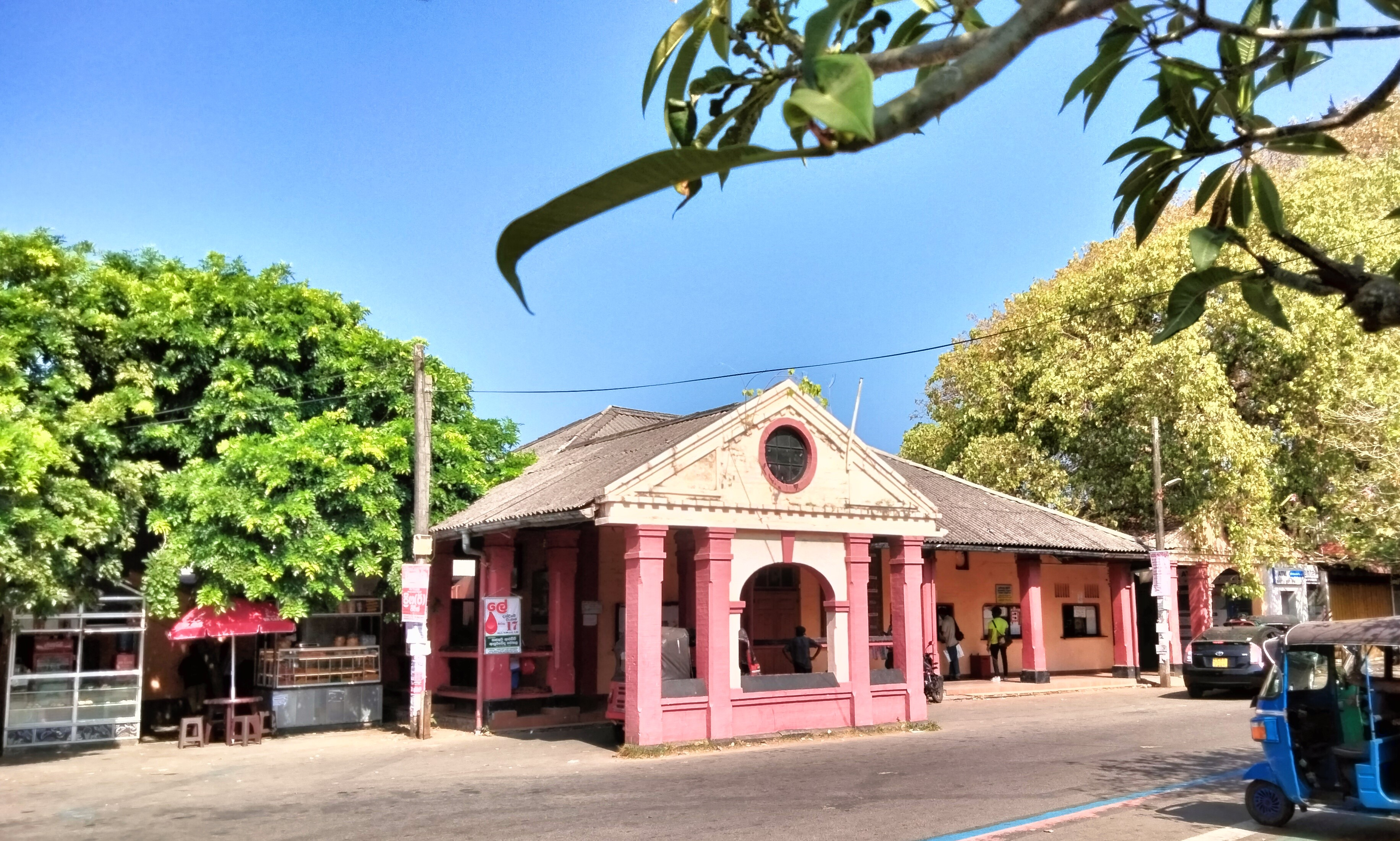
Panadura Railway Station

Panadura railway station is located to the west of the town, and is located on the Coastal line.

=== Bus ===
Due to Panadura being situated along Galle Road, it is serviced by many bus routes terminating at Panadura as well as ones heading further south.

== Health care facilities ==
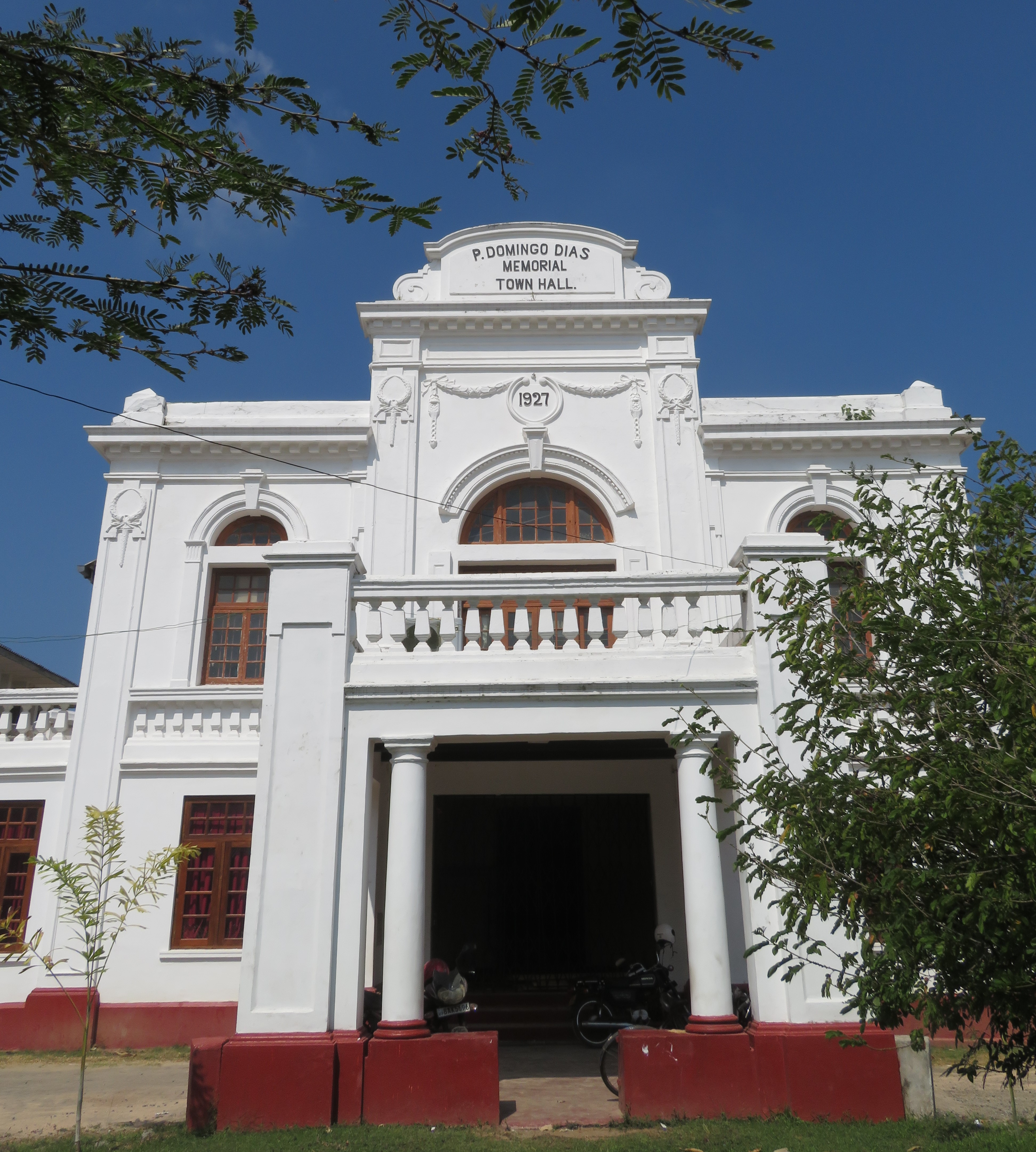
Domingo Dias Memorial Town Hall

P. C. H. Dias Memorial Hospital is the fourth largest hospital in the country, dedicated for Obstetrics and Gynecology. This 32-room mansion was donated by the children of Ponnahennedige Charles Henry Dias as per their mother’s bequest in 1972 and inaugurated in the same year by Prime Minister Sirimavo Bandaranaike. The name of the hospital was subsequently modified to Panadura Kethumathie Hospital and upon challenge by her grand children, reverted back to the original name of P. C. H. Dias Memorial Hospital in 2018. The hospital is situated at the centre of Panadura, 10 m (33 ft) from the A2 road. This hospital is a comprehensive with neonatal ICU and has a 300 bed capacity. A grade-1 Base hospital situated near the Panadura police station facing A2 road. Apart from this there are wide range of health care facilities run by the Government. There is an Ayurvedic Treatment Centre in Pallimulla, Panadura.

== Public and Private schools ==
- Sri Sumangala College
- Lyceum International School Panadura
- Leeds International School Panadura
- Sri Sumangala Balika Maha Vidyalaya
- Agamathi Balika Vidyalaya Panadura
- St. John's College Panadura
- Royal College, Panadura
- Mahanama College Panadura
- St. John's Girls' School Panadura
- Bauddhaloka Maha Vidyalaya Panadura
- Good Shepherd Convent Pandura
- Panadura Balika Vidyalaya Panadura
- Nalluruwa Siri Seevali Maha Vidyalaya
- St Anthony’s Boys School
- St Anthony’s Girls School
- Pinwatta Maha Vidyalaya
- Jeelan Central College (National School)
- Jeramies Dias Kanishta Vidyalaya
- Kuruppumulla Sri Prakrama Vidyalaya
- Dibbedda Gunawardena Kanishta Vidyalaya
- Upadya Vidyalaya Panadura
- Bekkegama Kanishta Vidyalaya
- Methodis’t Primary School
- Malamulla Maha Vidyalaya
- Thotawatta Al Fahriya central Muslim madya maha vidyalaya
- Ikra international College
- Ambalanduwa Ilma Muslim Vidyalaya

== Architecture ==
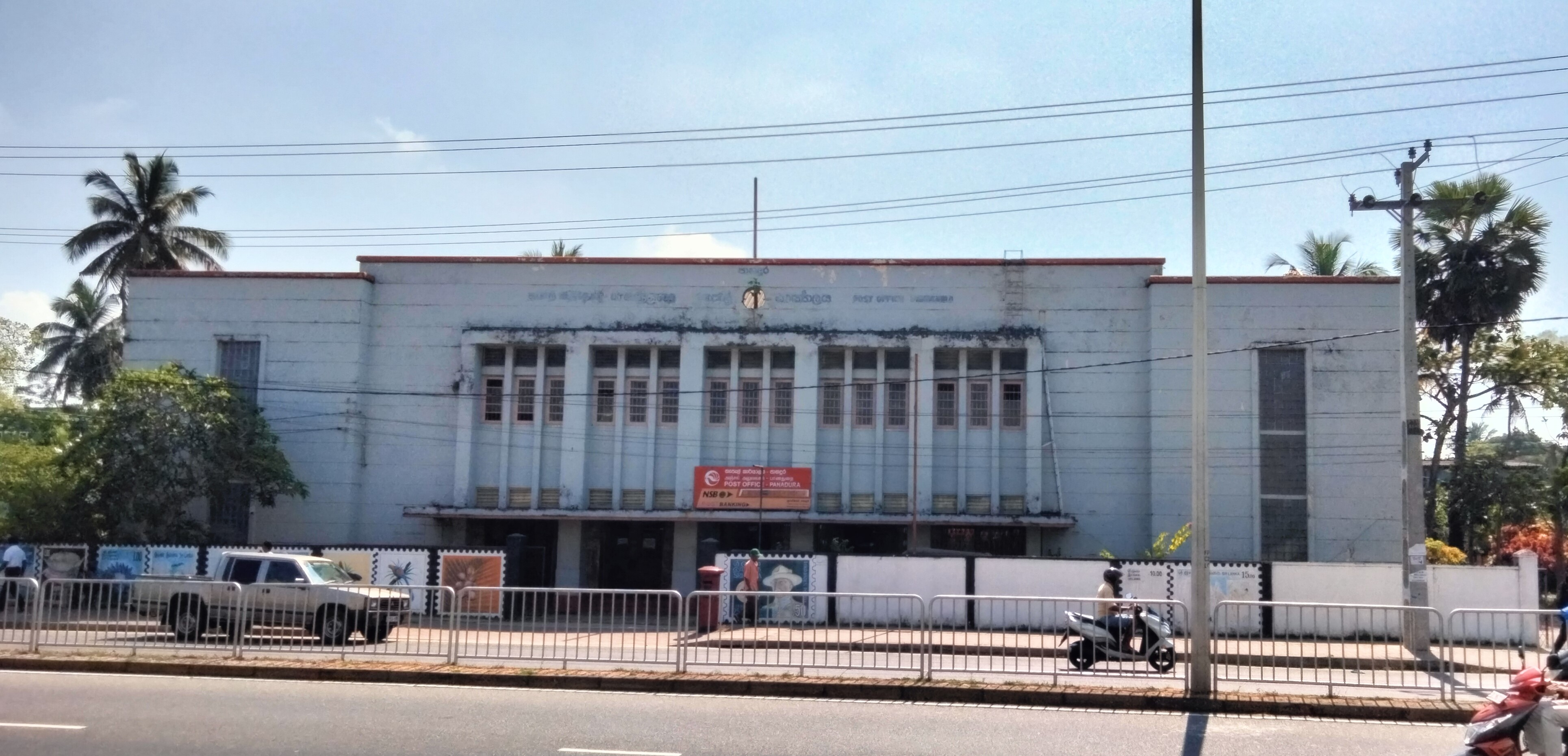
Post Office

One of the oldest and most representative buildings in Panadura is the Post Office in Galle Road. The Domingo Dias Memorial Town Hall dating from 1927 is used for concerts and exhibitions.

== Notable individuals ==
- Celestina Dias – entrepreneur and philanthropist
- Professor Gunapala Piyasena Malalasekera – Sri Lankan academic, scholar and diplomat
- Dr. Premasiri Khemadasa – music director, composer
- Arthur V. Dias - a planter by profession, he is known as "Kos Mama"
- Dr. Nalin de Silva – theoretical physicist, philosopher and political analyst
- Professor Ravindra Fernando – forensic pathologist, toxicologist, physician, writer and academic
- Leslie Goonewardene (MP) – one of the founders of the Lanka Sama Samaja Party
- Wilmot A. Perera – statesman and diplomat
- Prasanna Vithanage – film director
- Ravindra Pushpakumara – international cricketer
- Charitha Buddhika – international cricketer
- Chamara Silva – international cricketer
- Don Anurasiri – international cricketer
- Dilruwan Perera – international cricketer
- Akila Dananjaya – internationalcCricketer
- Mohomed Dilshad – first-class cricketer
- Priyantha Seneviratne - Senior Actor
- R. B. Lenora - Physician, senator
