= Ayesha Rauf =

Sri Lankan educator and politician (1914-1992)

Deshabandhu Ayesha Rauf
- ஆயிஷா ரவூப் අයේෂා රවුෆ්
- Born: Ayesha Beebi Mayen; 7 June 1914; Tellicherry, British India
- Died: 8 January 1992 (aged 77); Colombo, Sri Lanka
- Education: Queen Mary's College
- Occupation: Educator
- Political party: United National Party

Ayesha Beebi Rauf (Tamil: ஆயிஷா ரவூப்; Sinhala: අයේෂා රවුෆ්; née Mayen; 7 June 1914 – 8 January 1992) was an Indian-born educator and politician in Sri Lanka. A pioneer of Muslim girls' eduction in the Malabar region and Ceylon, she was the first principal of Muslim Ladies' College in Colombo. The first Muslim woman to enter politics in Ceylon, she was a member of Colombo Municipal Council and the city's first woman deputy mayor.

== Early life and education ==
Ayesha Beebi Mayen was born on 7 June 1914 (Note: Haniffa gives Ayesha's date of birth as 1917.) in Tellicherry, Malabar District in present-day Kerala. She was the daughter of Vayaparathu Kunath Mayen, Devan of Cannanore, and Puthiya Walapul Kayumma. She belonged to the Mappila community, Sunni Muslims from the Malabar region who followed the Shafi'i school and claim descend from Arab traders. She had two sisters and a brother. Puthiya Walapul Kayumma died when Ayesha was six years old.

The Mappila community were conservative - women lived in strict purdah and very few girls were allowed to attend secondary schools. V. K. Mayen was unorthodox in this context and was determined to give all his children a good education. As a result he was dubbed "Kafir Mayen" and "Attaturk of Malabar". Ayesha and her older sister attended Sacred Heart Convent in Tellicherry where they were the only Muslims. Ayesha was head prefect in her final year at Sacred Heart. She then attended St. Anne’s College and Queen Mary's College, both affiliated to the University of Madras. She studied political science, English, French, economics and history and graduated with a Bachelor of Arts degree, becoming the first Mappila woman to receive a university degree.

V. K. Mayen was active in local politics and was president of the Tellicherry branch of the Indian National Congress and, later, the All-India Muslim League. As a result Ayesha met many leading figures from the Indian independence movement, including Gandhi, Nehru and Sarojini Naidu, when they visited Tellicherry.

== Educational career ==
=== India ===
Following graduation, Ayesha worked as a teacher at a local training college for a brief period before becoming a school inspector. Her work as a sub inspector in Malabar involved extensive, independent travel. This was disapproved by many in the Muslim community and she received threatening letters. She lived alone with just a maidservant which was also disapproved by the Muslim community. She then worked alongside her brother who was also a school inspector.

Ayesha then pursued postgraduate studies, receiving a licentiate in education from Lady Wellington Training College in Madras. She was then appointed as officer for Muslim education in the colonial Madras Educational Service, a post she held until her marriage four years later. During this period she helped establish a number of small primary schools for Muslim girls which, after a slow start, flourished. She then played a key role in the founding of a girls' secondary school in southern Malabar which went onto becoming one of the leading schools in the region. Ayesha was also involved in several Muslim women's organisations.

=== Ceylon ===
A couple of years after moving to Ceylon, Ayesha came to the attention of Razik Fareed, a wealthy and prominent Ceylon Muslim politician. Spotting her potential, Fareed introduced Ayesha to Minister of Education C. W. W. Kannangara and Director of Education Henry William Howes. She was appointed as an assistant teacher at the Government Girls’ College in Maradana, a predominantly Muslim neighborhood of Colombo. It was hoped Ayesha would encourage Muslim girls to attend school but she was only at the school for a couple of months.

An English-medium school for Muslim girls in Colombo had been an ambition for Celyon's leading Muslims for many years. The Muslim Ladies' College (MLC) was founded on 9 September 1946 in the back garden of Hajara Villa, Fareed's home on Fareed Place in Bambalapitiya. On 1 November 1946 the school was registered with the government's free education scheme for assisted schools. Fareed persuaded Ayesha to be the school's first principal.

MLC, which initially started with funding of Rs. 1,000 each from Fareed and his sister, and Rs. 500 from the Moor Ladies’ Union, faced financial difficulties. Ayesha and group of young boys from the Moors Islamic Cultural Home (MICH) had to sell flags at Fort railway station to raise funds. She suggested that the school provide boarding facilities to encourage enrolment from outside Colombo and to generate much needed revenue. The first student hostel opened in January 1947. Finances were also improved by fundraisers and a month long carnival which raised Rs. 10,000.

MLC only had 20 students and three teachers when it opened September 1947. Ayesha resorted to visiting Muslim homes to encourage parents to send their daughters to the school. She even went to the MICH to persuade boys to speak to their parents about sending their sisters to the school. Ayesha's efforts contributed to enrolment increasing to 200 within two months. The school flourished under Ayesha's leadership, accepting students from all social backgrounds and across Ceylon. Five years after opening the school had 450 students and 20 teachers and provided education up to Secondary School Certificate level. Ayesha retired from MLC in 1970.

== Political career ==
Ayesha was the first Muslim woman to enter politics in Ceylon. She unsuccessfully contested the 1947 parliamentary election as an independent candidate in Colombo Central. Ayesha claimed she lost as the Muslim vote had been split by M. H. M. Munas, her husband’s brother-in-law. She also unsuccessfully contested the 1950 parliamentary by-election in Colombo Central as an independent candidate.

Ayesha then contested the 1949 Colombo Municipal Council (CMC) elections in Pettah ward as an independent candidate and defeated incumbent deputy mayor M. F. Ghany. She was the first Muslim woman member of the municipal council and one of three women municipal councillors along with Vivienne Goonewardene and Meena Ratnam. She was elected deputy mayor in January 1952 with the support of leftist municipal councillors. She served as deputy mayor until July 1954.

Although Ayesha was associated with mainstream leftist parties, she also took an interest in the affairs of Malayalis, Ceylonese of Indian origin. She was a member of the Ceylon Indian Congress and was involved in the campaign to protect the civic rights of Ceylonese Malayalis who were the target of Sinhalese nationalists in post-independence Ceylon. Ayesha later moved away from the leftists and in 1954 joined the United National Party (UNP). She was re-elected to CMC at the 1954 and 1957 elections as a UNP candidate in St. Paul’s ward (Kochchikade).

Ayesha's political career brought her into conflict with some parents of MLC students. They believed that her politics had a detrimental impact on the school and accused Ayesha and the school of producing only "good cooks". A petition was started to have her removed. In 1960 the Ceylonese government nationalised privately run assisted schools such as MLC. Ceylonese law forbade state employees from holding public office. Forced to choose between her education career and political career, Ayesha resigned from CMC in 1961. She had served three terms on CMC - January 1950 to July 1954; January 1957 to December 1957; and January 1960 to August 1962.

== Later life ==
A year after retirement, Ayesha moved to Zambia to teach political science at a high school. After retiring for a second time, she returned to Sri Lanka (as Ceylon had been renamed) and tried to re-enter politics at the 1977 parliamentary election as a UNP candidate. However, during the five years she had been away from the country, she has been removed from the electoral roll and was ineligible to contest the election. She nevertheless campaigned for UNP candidates Jabir A. Cader, R. Premadasa and Vincent Perera.

Ayesha was awarded the Deshabandhu national honour in 1990 for her contribution to education and politics. She died on 8 January 1992 in Colombo following a heart attack.

== Personal life ==
Ayesha married M. S. M. Rauf, a Ceylonese businessman living in Coimbatore, on 3 February 1943. The following year they moved to Colombo, Ceylon where they lived with Rauf's family on Silversmith Street in Hulftsdorp. Ayesha and Rauf had two children, daughter Neloufer and son Ismeth. Rauf died in January 1964.
