= Noordeen Hadjiar Mohamed Abdul Cadder =

Ceylonese lawyer and legislator

Noordeen Hadjiar Mohamed Abdul Cadder (known as N. H. M. Abdul Cadder) (10 February 1879 – 29 August 1938) was a Ceylonese (Sri Lankan) lawyer and legislator. He was an unofficial member of the Legislative Council of Ceylon representing the Muhammadan community.

Born in Colombo to Noordeen Hajiar, his family claimed ancestry to Arabs who settled in the costal town of Beruwala. His brother was the success gen merchant Noordeen Hajiar Abdul Caffoor, who built the Gaffoor Building in Colombo Fort. Abdul Cadder was educated at Wesley College, Colombo and qualified as a Proctor and Notary Public in 1907. He was a pioneer of the cinema business.

In 1908, Abdul Cader was elected to the Colombo Municipal Council from the Pettah Ward and remained a member for the next thirty years, mostly returning uncontested. He succeeded Wapchie Marikar Abdul Rahman as the appointed unofficial member for the Muhammadan community in the Legislative Council of Ceylon, serving from 1916 to 1930. He was the president of the All Ceylon Muslim League until his death, he was succeeded by T. B. Jayah. He was the manager of the Zahira College, Colombo from 1921 to 1938.
