= Hameed Al Husseinie College =

- හමීඩ් අල් හුසේනි විද්යාලය ஹமீத் அல் ஹுசைனி கல்லூரி

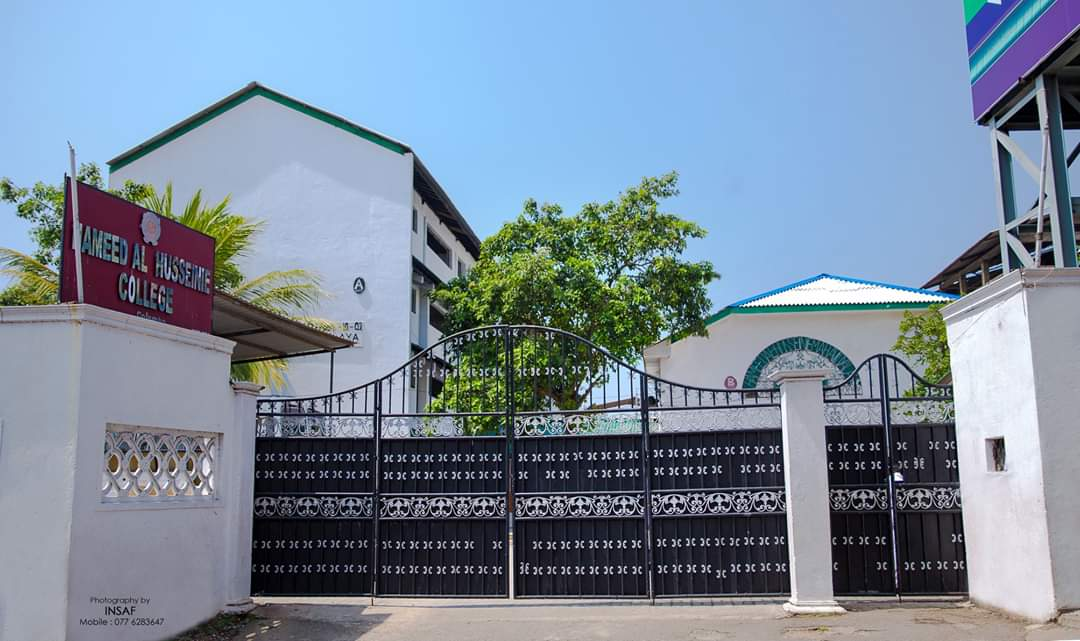
- School Entrance

Location
- No. 45, Hussainiya Street, Colombo-12; Colombo; Sri Lanka; 6.940890°N 79.859637°E

Information
- Former names: Hameed Al Husseinie Maha Vidyalaya (1963-1991); Hameediah Boys' English School (1921-1969); Al Madrasathul Hameediah (1901-1921); Al Madrasathul Khairiyyathul Islamiah (1884-1901)
- Type: Public National
- Motto: Seek Knowledge From Cradle To Grave
- Religious affiliation: Islamic
- Established: 15 November 1884 - 140 Years Ago
- Principal: Mrs.N.Shania Dain
- Staff: >110
- Teaching staff: >90
- Grades: 1-13
- Years offered: 6 - 19
- Gender: Male
- Language: Sinhala & Tamil
- Hours in school day: 7:30 to 13:30
- Colors: Maroon, Golden Yellow & Green
- Song: ………يَا رَبِّ أَعْطَلَنَا عِلْمًا نَافِعًا "Yarabba.." - O Lord (Allah) give us useful knowledge …
- Alumni: Hameedians or Old Hameedians

Hameed Al Husseinie College (Sinhala: හමීඩ් අල් හුසේනි විද්යාලය; Tamil: ஹமீத் அல் ஹுசைனி கல்லூரி; Arabic: كلية حميد الحسينى) is an Islamic national school in Colombo, Sri Lanka, founded in 1884 is the First Muslim Boys School in Sri Lanka.

== History ==
The college began as a school, the Al Madrasathul Khairiyyathul Islamiah. Founded by Marhoom Sidde Lebbe, Marhoom Wapichi Marikkar and Ahmed Urabi Pasha, at the school's opening ceremony on 15 November 1884 (First Muslim School in Sri Lanka), Ahmed Orabi made a speech on the importance of the new school to Sri Lanka's Muslim community. The Muslim community was not willing to enter into the modern education system introduced in the 19th century, for several reasons. One was that most of the schools were established and controlled by the Christian missionaries. The traditional and conservative Muslims had the fear that English education may lead their children to Christianity, as they witnessed in Sinhalese and Tamil communities. Hence, Siddi Lebbe wanted to establish separate schools for Muslims as did the Buddhism and Hindus revivalists. His dream was realised in November 1884 with the establishment of the first Muslim English school in this country - 'AL Madurasathul Khairiyyatul Islamiah' in Colombo.

In 1901, Noordeen Hadjiar, trustee of the Grand Mosque of Colombo, built a new building for the school using his own funds as a monument to the Silver Jubilee Celebrations of Abdul Hamid II, the Ottoman Sultan, and renamed the school Al Madrasathul Hameediah. In the same year a farewell ceremony was held for Orabi at the school premises to mark his departure from Ceylon to Egypt. In 1921, the school was again renamed as Hameediah Boys' English School.

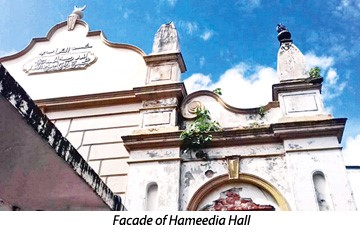
The First Building - Hameedia Hall

During this same period, The Ceylon Moslem Educational Society Ltd. was founded in 1919 with the objective of looking after the educational needs of the Muslim community. The first school founded by the society was in Hulftsdrop Street and was called Akbar School. Later the members of the society bought the property at 45 Husseiniya Street (then called Kuruwe Street) and the school was shifted there in 1919 and named Husseinie Boys’ English School.

The school was amalgamated in 1961 with the nearby Husseinie Boys' English School under the new name Hameed Al Husseinie Maha Vidyalaya by Badiudin Mahmud, the Minister of Education. On 29 August 1972, government ministers Pieter Keuneman and Badiudin Mahmud visited the school and unveiled a new five-storey building block and a three-storey science section. These buildings were completed in 1982 and the then Prime Minister Ranasinghe Premadasa visited the school and declared it open on 3 June 1982 by the invitation of then Minister of Education Ranil Wickremasinghe.

The school was officially granted college status in 1991, and was renamed Hameed Al Husseinie College. It was elevated to a National School on 26 July 1996.

To remark the school 125th years, a stamp (Rs. 5/=) was released 30 July 2009 at the college premises.

The walk 2024 on commemorating the 140th year held on 4 January 2025.

== Founding Fathers ==
=== Marhoom M. C. Siddi Lebbe ===
Marhoom Mohammado Cassim Siddi Lebbe was one of the founding fathers of Hameed Al Husseinie College, along with Marhoom Wapichi Marikar and Marhoom Orabi Pasha, initiated to form the First Muslim Boys’ School in 1884 under the name "Al Madrasathul Khariyathul Islamiya". Born on 11 June 1838, M.C. Siddi Lebbe, was a lawyer, educationist, scholar, philosopher, seer, writer, publisher, social reformer and visionary.

Born in Kandy to a family where intellectual and religious pursuits were encouraged, he was determined to follow his father M. L. Siddi Lebbe's footsteps. His father was one of the 1st Ceylonese proctors, and was the Head Moorman of the district in 1833. Siddi Lebbe became a proctor in 1862 at the age of 24. He practiced in the District Court of Kandy as well as the Supreme Court. He was a member of the Kandy Municipal Council representing Ward No. 4 for eight years. He also acted as Municipal Magistrate for four years.

Siddi Lebbe felt that the Muslims should be aroused to realize their sorry state in education. They were educationally backward, economically stagnant, culturally isolated, religiously obscurantist, intellectually sterile and politically insignificant. This he sought to achieve through the Arabic-Tamil weekly, he founded to which he gave the name 'Muslim Nesan'. To uplift the educational needs of the Muslim community, he along with his companions initiated many schools in the island.

Although he was a rich man, at the time of his death, he had either sold or mortgaged the major part of his properties in order to finance these schools. He also started the First Muslim Girls' School in Kandy where his sister was the Head Teacher.

He died on 5 February 1898, the entire Muslim population has paid homage to the inspiring life and work of Marhoom Sidde Lebbe as one of the greatest sons of mother Lanka. It is due to these factors, the Government included the name of Marhoom Sidde Lebbe in the list of National Heroes. In addition, Rs. 1 Stamp was issued on 11 June 1977.

=== Marhoom Orabi Pasha ===
Born in 1841 in Horiyeh, Egypt, Ahmed Orabi (well known as Orabi Pasha) was the peasant son of a village sheikh. After studying at Al-Azhar, he was conscripted to the Army and rose to be a remarkable officer. He was the leader of the National Revolt in Egypt. The discrimination in the Army and mismanagement of the Khedive led to the formation of the National Movement in 1881 under the leadership of Colonel Orabi. They compelled the Khedive to appoint a Revolutionary Government with Orabi as War Minister. Orabi led a national revolt against the injustices of the Turkish ruler Fewfik, who called on the British to protect him.

The Egyptians under Orabi fought gallantly but vainly against the British troops who entered Cairo and occupied Egypt for 70 years. He was arrested and sentenced with six other officers to exile for life in Ceylon.

In a cold and gloomy night, these seven vanquished officers were sent, together with their families by a special train to Suez under stringent precautions. On the next day, 27 December they left Suez in the specially chartered ship SS Mariotis to Ceylon.

On 10 January 1893, the ship Mariotis anchored in the Colombo Harbour. The Muslim Community, who had religious and racial ties with the exiles-gathered in large number to receive the 'Heroes' with garlands. As soon as the leaders landed, the people shouted and followed them in a big demonstration. The Police cleared the way to the carriages prepared to transfer the exiles to their residences. Orabi Pasha was taken to the Lake House and the rest to different places. To each house a Muslim constable was assigned to guard the occupants. Thus was the scenario when they landed in Ceylon.

The Egyptian leaders, expecting that they would spend their whole life in exile, asked for English education for their children. They also established good relations with the prominent Muslim personalities on that time such as Wapichi Marikar and Sidde Lebbe. Orabi Pasha became very popular among Muslims in the island and he helped Sidde Lebbe and Wapichi Marikar in forming the First Muslim Boys’ School under the name of "Al Madrasathul Khariyathul Islamiya". He himself paid Rs. 100 from his allowances for the salary of the teaching staff of the school.

Orabi Pasha was so much influential in making the Muslim community to understand the need of better education. He helped the other two in initiating many schools in many parts of the island. Orabi Pasha lived in Colombo until 1892, then moved to Kandy to the house known as 'Arabi House' and stayed there until he was pardoned in 1901.

In May 1901, the final pardon for Orabi Pasha arrived in the island and permitted to return home. A grand farewell gathering was arranged for Orabi Pasha and his associates at Al Madrasathul Khariyathul Islamiya where wide scale of celebrations were held with recital of prayers of Arabic poems of salutations as well as special prayers for the safe return of the party to their homeland.

On 17 September 1901 the German Ship 'Princess Irene' sailed from Colombo Harbour carrying Orabi Pasha and his family to their motherland Egypt, where he died peacefully on 21 September 1911.

The Orabi Pasha Museum (formally Orabi House) at George E. de Silva Mawatha, Kandy was inaugurated on 13 November 1983 and remembering his yeoman service to the educational needs of the Muslim community, part of Maradana Road was named as Orabi Pasha Road and a 50 cts. Commemorative stamp was released on the same day.

=== Marhoom Justice M. T. Akbar ===
Marhoom Justice M. T. Akbar was the Founding Father of Hussenie Boys’ English School which was later amalgamated with Hameediah Boys’ English School in 1963.

Born in 1880, Justice Akbar, was the first to adore the Supreme Court Bench and he was the first Ceylon Muslim to be raised to the status of a King's Counsel. At the time of his retirement, he was the senior-most Puisne Justice. Born in a wealthy family, he showed great interest in the educational needs of the Muslim Community as well as Muslim law in the country.

He realised the educational backwardness of the Muslim community formed the Moslem Educational Society Ltd in 1919 and served as the Founder Secretary. During this time, he formed the first Muslim School under the name "Akbar School" in Hulftsdorp. His main intention was to give education to the children of middle-class families that refrain their children from going to school due to financial constrains. This paved the way for many families in the close vicinity to send their children to get education.

Later, the Moslem Educational Society Ltd. bought the property at No. 45, then Kuruwe Street (now Husseiniya Street) and shifted the school there and thus the School got its new name Husseinie Boys’ English School. Justice M. T. Akbar died on 22 April 1944. To honour his service to the community, his name adorns one of the Roads in Colombo 02 as Justice Akbar Mawatha.

=== Marhoom A. M. Wapichi Marikar ===
Marhoom Arasy Marikar Wapichi Marikar was another Founding Father of Hameed Al Husseinie College. He gave the major financial support to initiate and to form the First Muslim Boys’ School in 1884 under the name "Al Madrasathul Khariyathul Islamiya". Born in a well to do family during the colonial era, he was one of the major financial contributors as well as principle architectural consultant in building many buildings. He was the main architect of many buildings built during his time such as General Post Office, the Colombo Museum, Colombo Customs, Colombo Town Hall in Pettah, the Galle Face Hotel, Victoria Arcade, etc.

He always thought of his community's educational, welfare, religious and economical needs and looked out for ways and means to help with the wealth he had. When Marhoom Sidde Lebbe came down from Kandy and started his educational movement in 1880s with a lecture at the Maradana Mosque hall, Wapichi Marikar wholeheartedly joined with Sidde Lebbe and supported him in his activities. This paved the way of bringing up many Muslim schools on that time. He was a pious Muslim who created many mosques and served as a trusty in many mosques and liberally spent his own money for maintaining these mosques. He died on 14 May 1925 at the age of 96.

== Principals ==
Principals Served Since 1884
Years of Active	Name
1884 - 1963	Full details to be updated -
During 1948-1955	Mr.Ishaak
During 1957	Mr.M.H.Amith
1963 - 1970	Mr.M.A.C.A.Rahuman
1970 - 1973	Mr.M.F.M.F.Fakhir
1973 - 1991	Mr.M.Ashraff
1991 - 1991	Mr.A.H.Kifayathullah
1991 - 1993	Mr.M.U.M.Sanoos
1993 - 1993	Mr.M.S.A.Saroor
1993 - 1997	Mr.M.A.C.Faleel
1997 - 2002	Mr. M.U.M.Sanoos
2002 - 2003	Mr. T.M.A.Jayah
2003 - 2004	Mr.A.R.M.M.Trisvi
2004 - 2008	Mr.M.I.Asadullah
2008 - 2009	Mr.M.A.C.Faleel
2009 - 2011	Mr.M.H.M.Zakariya
2011 - 2013	Mr.M.S.M.Mansoor
2013 - 2016	Mr.N.T.Nasimudeen
2016 - 2017	Mr.M.S.M.Faizal
2017-2023	Mr.A.K.T.Adahan
2023-2025	Mr.M.R.M.Risky
2025-Today	Mrs.N.Shania Dain

Mrs.N.Shania Dain becomes the First lady principal of the 141 years of history of Hameed Al Husseinie College.

== Notable alumni ==
Name	Categories		
Dr.M.C.M.Khaleel	Medicine Politics	Doctor	Famous Physician, Former Minister & Member of Parliament.
Mr.M.J.M.Lafir	Sports	Billiards	Former World Billiards Champion
Mr.Alavi Moulana	Politics		Former Minister, Member of Parliament & & Governor of Western Province
Mr.Mohammed Rikaz	Sports	Snooker	National 🇱🇰Snooker Champion
Mr.M.I.M.Zuhair	Sports	Football	Represented Sri Lanka National 🇱🇰Team in 1977
Mr.M.H.M.Naeem	Sports	Football	Represented Sri Lanka National 🇱🇰Team in 1977-1980
Mr.M.Z.M.Naushad	Sports	Football	Represented Sri Lanka National 🇱🇰Team in 1981-1984
Mr.Kamaldeen Kabeer	Sports	Football	Represented Sri Lanka National 🇱🇰Team in 1993-2000 Former National Team Captain
Mr.Azmeer Aliyar	Sports	Football	Represented Sri Lanka National 🇱🇰Team in 1999 - 2013
Mr.Mohamed Nifraz	Sports	Football	Represented Sri Lanka National 🇱🇰Team in 2006 - 2015
Mr.Tuwan Rizni	Sports	Football	Represented Sri Lanka National 🇱🇰Team in 2009-2014
Mr.Hakeem Kamil	Sports	Football	Represented Sri Lanka National 🇱🇰Team in 2011-2018
Mr.Mohamed Afeel	Sports	Football	Represented Sri Lanka National 🇱🇰Team in 2013 - 2020
Mr.Mahendran Dinesh	Sports	Football	Represented Sri Lanka National 🇱🇰Team in 2020
Mr.Aman Faizer	Sports	Football	Represented Sri Lanka National 🇱🇰Team Current National 🇱🇰Player
Mr.Abdul Basith	Sports	Football	Represented Sri Lanka National 🇱🇰Team

== Sports ==
Sports hold major part of Hameed Al Husseinie College and sporting events are held throughout the year including the Inter-House Sports Festival. The college offers sports such as Soccer, Cricket, Volleyball, Karate, Swimming, Boxing, Carrom and Chess. and the most prominent sport is soccer.

=== Billiards and Snooker ===
==== MJM Lafir - World Amateur Billiard Champion ====
The first ever world championship title for any sports won by Sri Lanka. Muhammad Lafir was a past student of Hameed Al Husseinie College.

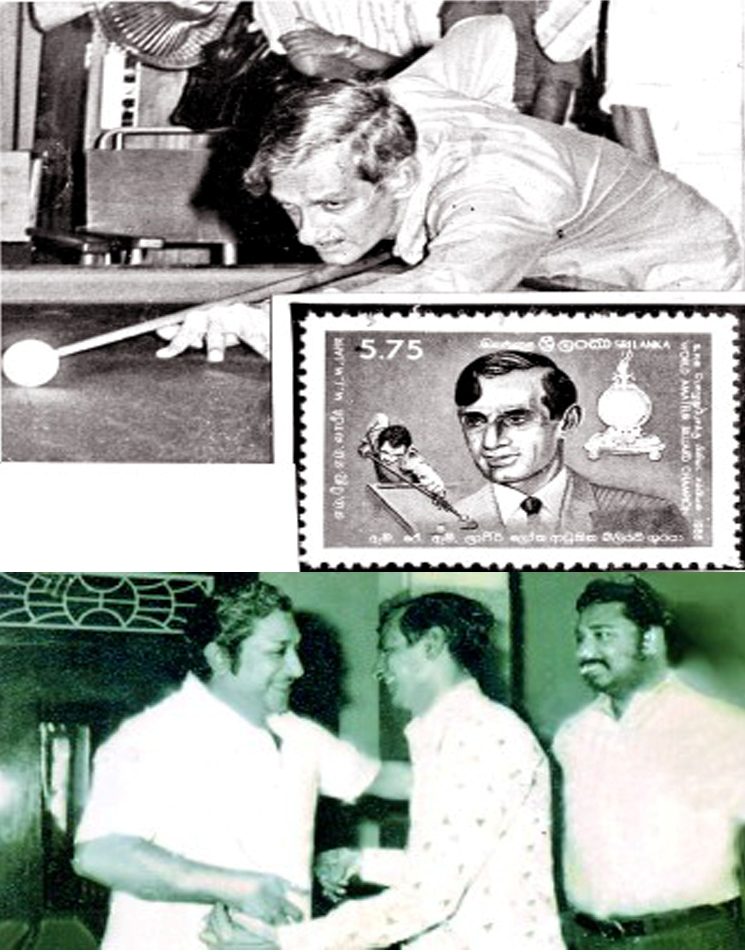
Billiard World Champion 1973 - Mr.M.J.M. Lafir

=== Football (Soccer) ===
The college has hosted the annual Invitation Schools Soccer Championship for t Dialog Trophy since 2007. In 2010 Zahira College, Colombo won the championship, beating St. Benedict's College, Colombo for the second consecutive time. Hameed Al Husseinie College won third place against Zahira College, Mawanella.

==== Presidents Cup – 2017 ====
In 2017 The Annual Invitation School Soccer Tournament organised by the G'80 (The OBA Group of 80's) was named "The Presidents Cup" and was held in January under the patronage of President Maithripala Siresena at the Colombo Racecourse Ground. The final was between Hameed Al Husseinie College vs Maris Stella College Negombo where the host Hameed Al Husseinie College Clinched the trophy yet again.

==== Presidents Cup – 2018 ====
Presidents Cup 2018 is underway and the tournament started on 25 February 2018 with a Grand Opening Ceremony with the participation of Leading 20 School Football Teams in Sri Lanka at the Colombo Racecourse Ground. As at 4 March 2018, Zahira College, Colombo and the defending champion Hameed Al Husseinie College, Colombo have ensured their positions in the Grand Finale which is to be held on 18 March 2018 under the flood lights at the Racecourse Ground, Colombo, under the patronage of H.E.Maithripala Siresena the president of Sri Lanka. The final was held on 18 March 2018 and the Zahira College Colombo become the New Champions after beating Hameed Al Husseinie College 4-3(1-1) in the penalty shootout.

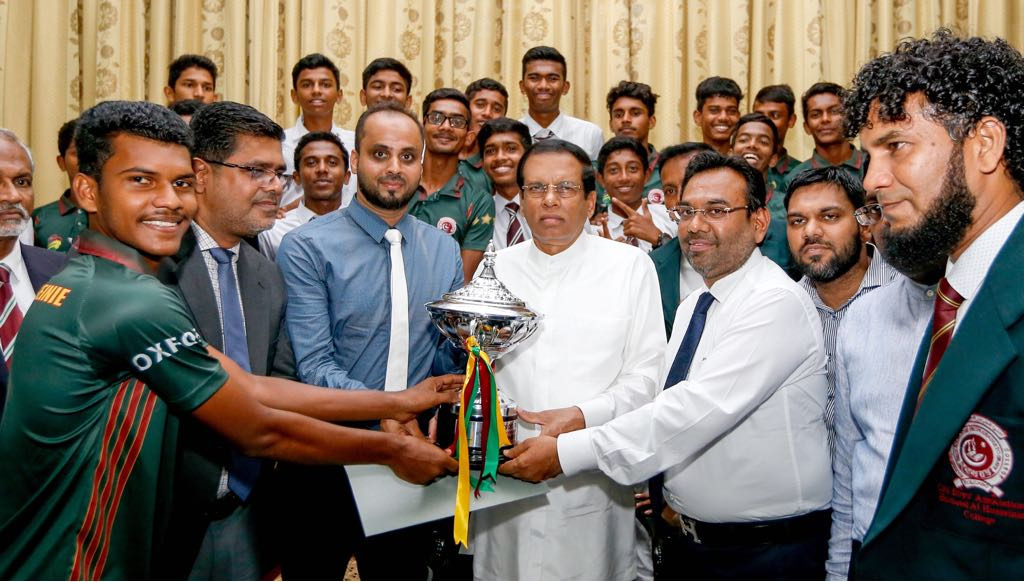
Meeting the President

==== Presidents Cup – 2019 ====
Presidents Cup 2019 was held between March and April 2019 and Hameed Al Husseinie College emerged as the Champions after beating comprehensively the Al Azhar Central College, Thihariya.

Presidents Cup – 2020

Presidents Cup 2020 is set to be held between 7 March 2020 to 28 March 2020 at the Racecourse Ground Colombo and it was held up at the semifinal stage due to the Covid -19 Pandemic situation. The following schools were selected for the Semifinals to be played

Defending Champions Hameed Al Husseinie College, S.Thomas' College, Mt.Lavinia, Maris Stella College, Negombo and Muslim Central College, Kaluthara.

The Tournament was restarted from the point where it was stopped and Hameed Al Husseinie College once again become the Champions in the Grand Finale held at the Colombo Racecourse on 27 March 2022 against Kalutara Muslim Central College.

==== Oxford Presidents Cup - 2024 ====
Hameed Al Husseinie College emerged as the Champions of the 2024 season after beating S.Thomas’ College Mt.Lavinia 3-0 in the final.

=== Presidents Cup Winners ===
Winners of All Seasons
Season	Year	Sponsor	Champions	Runners up
14	2024	Oxford	Hameed Al Husseinie College	S.Thomas’ College, Mt.Lavinia
13	2020	Oxford	Hameed Al Husseinie College	Muslim Central College Kalutara
12	2019	Oxford	Hameed Al Husseinie College	Al Azhar Central College Thihariya
11	2018	Oxford	Zahira College	Hameed Al Husseinie College
10	2017	iDealz	Hameed Al Husseinie College	Maris Stella College Negombo
9	2016			
8	2015	ANT	Hameed Al Husseinie College	Muslim Central College Kalutara
7	2014	The Soho House	Hameed Al Husseinie College	St.Benedict’s College
6	2013	Power Horn	Hameed Al Husseinie College	Lumbini College
5	2012		Lumbini College	St.Benedict’s College
4	2011		Zahira College	Lumbini College
3	2010		St.Benedict’s College	Zahira College
2	2009		Zahira College	De Mazenod College Kandana
1	2008	Dialog	Zahira College	St.Benedict’s College

==== Milo Cup All Island Tournament - 2018 ====
The All island Milo Cup under 12 tournament held for the year 2018 and Hameed Al Husseinie College emerged as the Western Province Champions.

==== Celebration of 60-year winning streak 1957–2017 ====
Hameed Al Husseinie College celebrated its 60 years of excellence with commemoration of its winning streak which started from John Tarbet Shield victory in the final match against Zahira College Colombo in 1957.

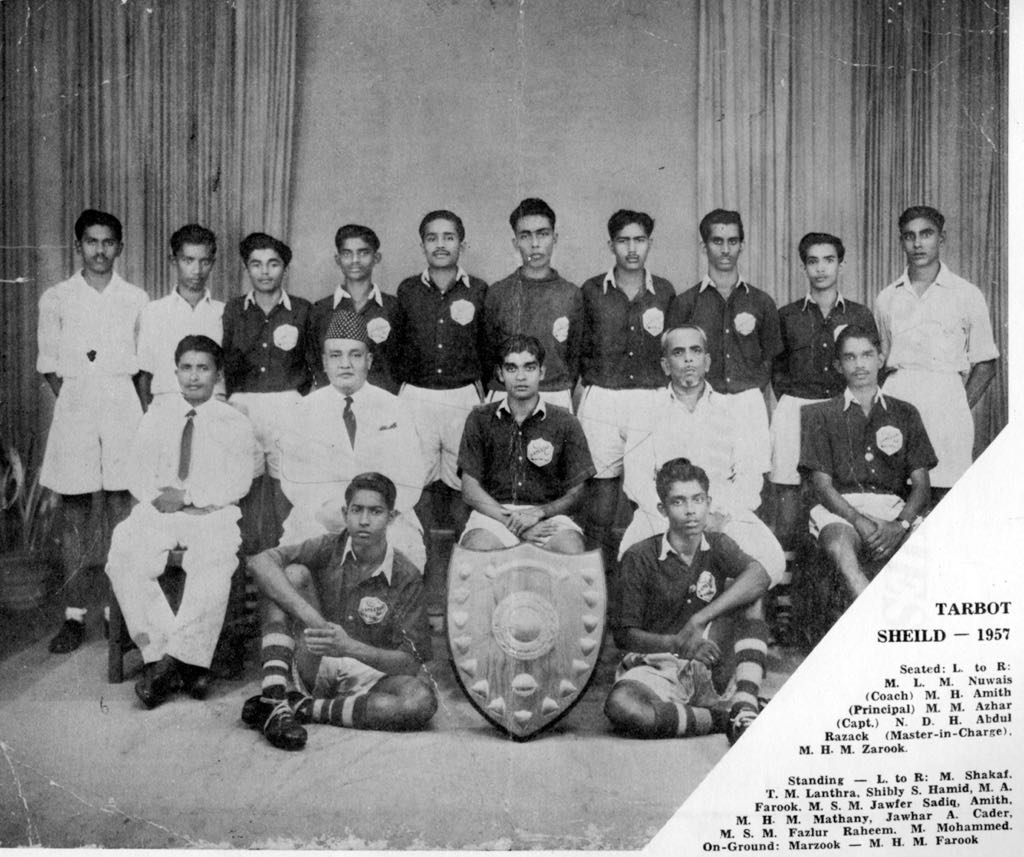
John Tarbet Shield 1957

=== Achievements in Soccer ===
Achievements by HAHC in recent years
Year	Age	Competition	Place
2026	Under 18	Renown Cup - Football All Island	Champions
2025	Under 20	Hameedia Vs Zahira Big Match - 1st Year	Winners
2024	Under 18	Zahira Super Sevens 2024 - Football All Island	Champions
	Under 18	Renown President’s Cup 2023 - Football All Island	Champions
	Under 18	Oxford Presidents Cup - Football All Island	Champions
2023	Under 18	All Island Schools Games - Football All Island	Champions
		All Island Schools Games - Football Western Province	Champions
		All Island Schools Games - Football Colombo Zonal	Champions
2022	Under 16	National Schools All Island	Champions
		National Schools Western Province	Champions
		National Schools Colombo Zonal	Champions
		Sri Lanka Schools Football Association All Island	Quarter Finalist
		Sri Lanka Schools Football Association Colombo Zonal	Champions
	Under 18	National Schools All Island	Runners Up
		National Schools Western Province	Champions
		National Schools Colombo Zonal	Champions
		Sri Lanka Schools Football Association All Island	Runners Up
	Under 20	National Schools Western Province	4th Place
		National Schools Colombo Zonal	Champions

== Inter-houses ==
There are four divisions among the students when it comes to inter-house competition and the names of the houses are as follows.

- Yemen colour is : Yellow
- Humaizara colour is : Blue
- Jeelan colour is : Green
- Thoose colour is : Red

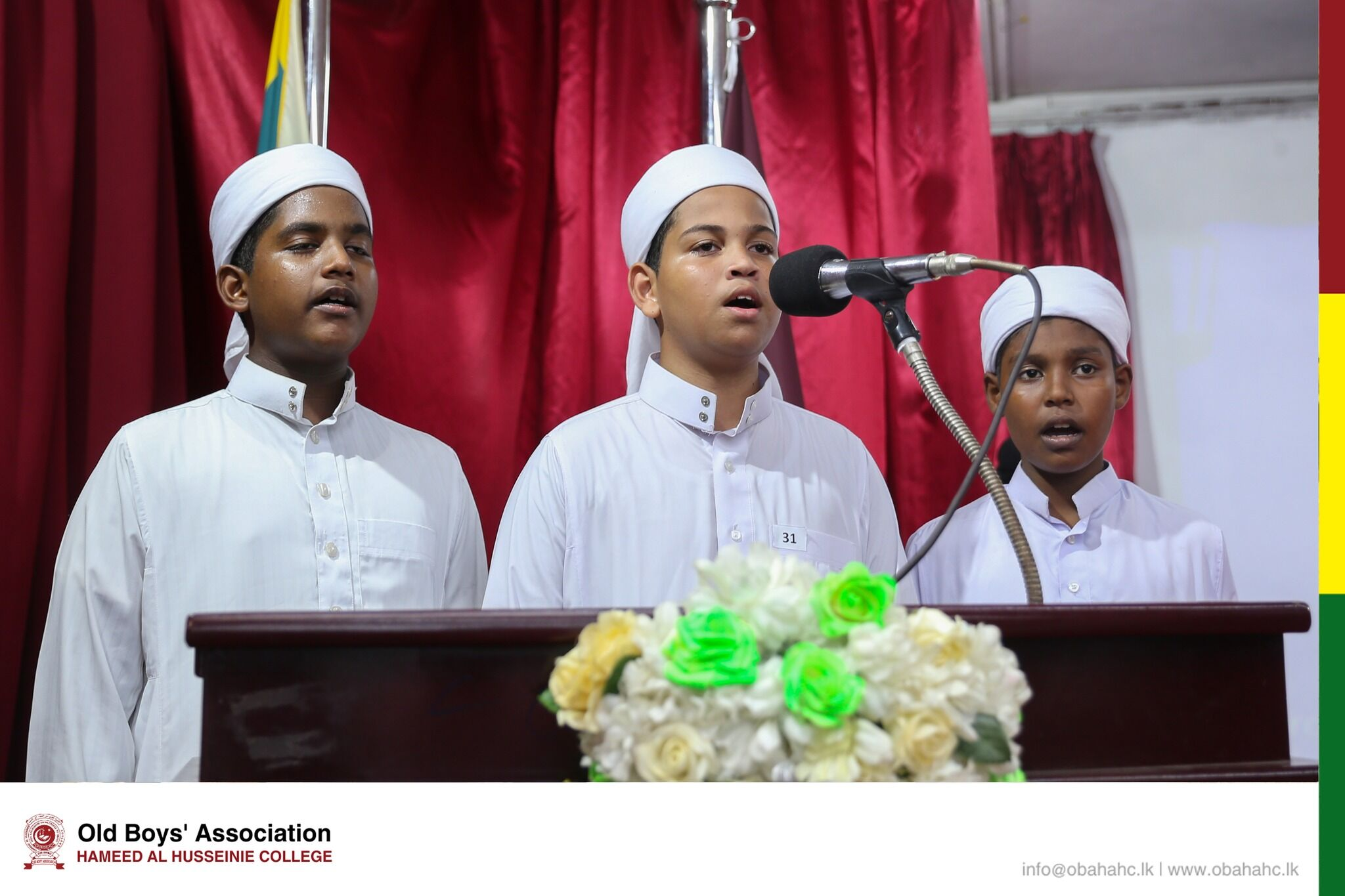
Performance by the students of Muslim Majlis of the college

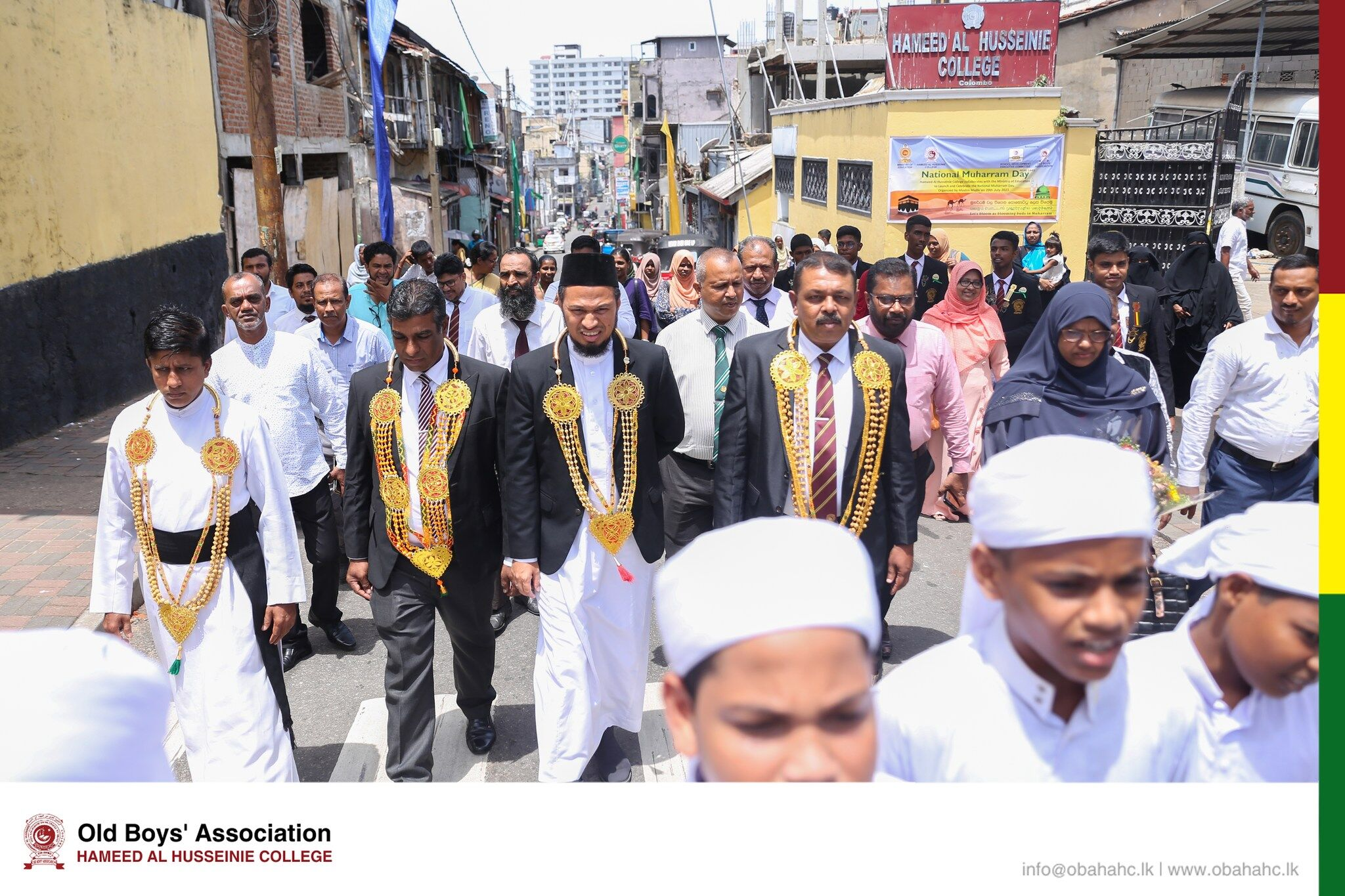
Guest arriving for the event

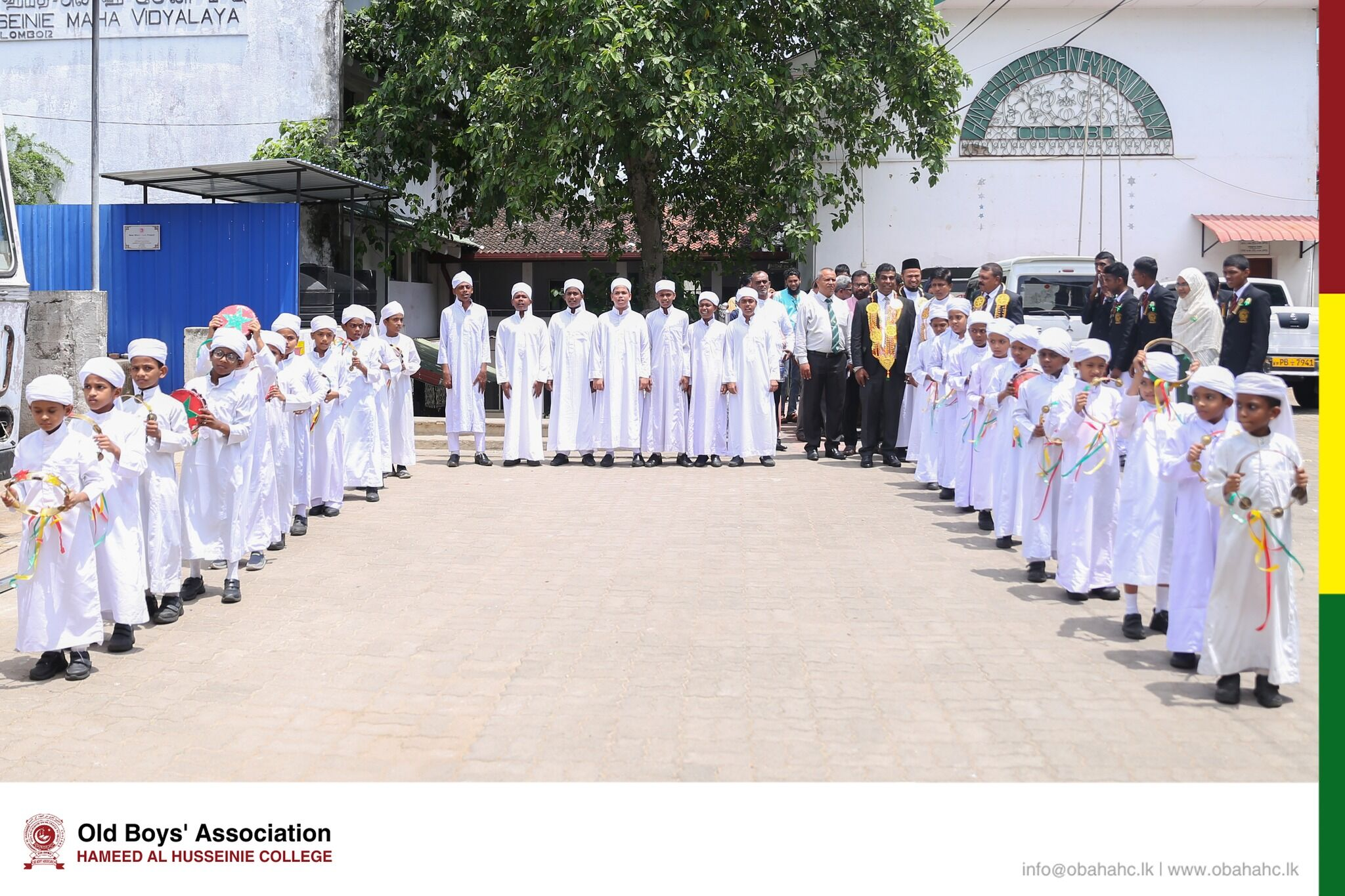
Welcoming guests for the event
