= M. C. M. Kaleel =

Ceylonese physician, social worker and politician

Hon. Mohamed Cassim Mohamed Kaleel MP

Minister of Labour and Social Services
- In office 1952–1956
- Preceded by: Tuan Burhanudeen Jayah
- Succeeded by: T. B. Ilangaratne

Minister of Home Affairs
- In office March 1960 – July 1960
- Preceded by: T. B. Ilangaratne
- Succeeded by: Maithripala Senanayake

Member of State Council
- In office 1942–1947
- Preceded by: A. E. Goonesinghe
- Succeeded by: Council abolished

Member of the Ceylon Parliament for Colombo Central
- In office 1950–1956
- Preceded by: Tuan Burhanudeen Jayah
- Succeeded by: M. S. Themis
- In office 1960–1965
- Preceded by: M. S. Themis
- Succeeded by: Falil Caffoor

Personal details
- Born: 3 February 1899 Hultfsdorp, Colombo, Ceylon
- Died: 19 October 1994 (aged 94)
- Party: United National Party
- Spouse: Noor Rahmaniya Marikar-Bawa
- Education: Hameed Al Husseinie College, Cathedral College Kotahena, S. Thomas' College, Mount Lavinia, University of Edinburgh
- Profession: Physician, politician

Mohamed Cassim Mohamed Kaleel (3 February 1899 – 19 October 1994) was a Ceylonese physician, social worker and politician.

Mohammad Cassim Mohammad Kaleel was born on 3 February 1899, the second son of Cassim Lebbe Marikar, a businessman and Moulavi (Islamic teacher) and Yousoof Sulaiha, in Hultsdorf, Colombo. He began his education at the Hameed Al Husseinie College (former Hameediya Arabic School), followed by Cathedral College Kotahena, finishing his schooling at S. Thomas' College, Mount Lavinia. Kaleel then attended the University of Edinburgh, where he graduated with a medical degree, which he followed with post-graduate qualifications in medicine.

In 1942 following the dismal of A. E. Goonesinghe from the State Council of Ceylon the All Ceylon Muslim League nominated Kaleel to run for the Colombo Central seat. He comfortably defeated his main opponent, Jinendrasinghe, and was sworn in as a member of the State Council.

In 1945 Kaleel suffered his first heart attack and was unable to join the Muslim League Delegation, which gave evidence before the Soulbury Commission nor was he able to attend the inaugural meeting of the United National Party.

At the 1st parliamentary election, held between 23 August 1947 and 20 September 1947, he acceded to Tuan Burhanudeen Jayah representing the United National Party in the Colombo Central electorate. Jayah was subsequently elected as the second member for Colombo Central, and was appointed as Minister of Labour and Social Services in the D. S. Senanayake cabinet. In 1950, Jayah resigned from parliament and cabinet minister to assume duties as the county's first High Commissioner to Pakistan.

In the following by election for the vacant seat, on 6 May 1950, Kaleel, running as the United National Party candidate, defeated his nearest rival, Dr. S. A. Wickramasinghe representing the Communist Party of Ceylon, by 2,295 votes.

At the 2nd parliamentary election held between 24 May 1952 and 30 May 1952, he was elected as the second member for Colombo Central. Kaleel was appointed as Minister for Labour in the First Dudley Senanayake cabinet, a post he continued to hold in the subsequent Kotelawala cabinet.

In 1956, at the 3rd parliamentary election he failed to secure one of the three seats in the Colombo Central electorate losing to the Mahajana Eksath Peramuna candidate, M. S. Themis, by a mere thirty five votes.

At the parliamentary elections in March 1960 Kaleel was elected as the first member for Colombo Central and was appointed as Minister of Home Affairs in second Dudley Senanayake cabinet.

In the subsequent parliamentary election in July 1960 the United National Party was defeated however Kaleel retained his seat as third member for Colombo Central. He declined to contest the following parliamentary elections in 1965 standing aside for Falil Caffoor.

Kaleel served as the United National Party president from 1990 until his death in October 1994, having earlier served as the party's treasurer and vice-president.

In 1986 the Government of Sri Lanka awarded Kaleel the civilian honour of Deshamanya.
