= T. B. Jayah =

Sri Lankan educationalist, politician, diplomat and Muslim and Malay community leader

The Honourable T. B. Jayah

Minister of Labour and Social Services
- In office 26 September 1947 – 1950
- Prime Minister: D. S. Senanayake
- Preceded by: I. X. Pereira
- Succeeded by: M. C. M. Kaleel

High Commissioner for Ceylon in Pakistan
- In office 1950–1957

President of All Ceylon Muslim League
- In office 1924–1950

Member of the Ceylon Parliament for Colombo Central
- In office 20 September 1947 – 30 May 1952
- Preceded by: Electorate Created
- Succeeded by: Razik Fareed

Member of Legislative Council
- In office 1924–1931

Member of State Council
- In office 1936–1947

Personal details
- Born: Tuan Burhanuddin Jayah; 1 January 1890 Galagedara, Ceylon
- Died: 31 May 1960 (aged 70) Mecca, Saudi Arabia
- Party: United National Party
- Education: University of London; S. Thomas' College, Mount Lavinia; St. Paul's College, Kandy
- Profession: Educationalist

Tuan Burhanuddin Jayah (1 January 1890 – 31 May 1960), was a Sri Lankan educationalist, politician, diplomat and Muslim and Malay community leader and considered one of Sri Lanka's national heroes. He started his career as a school teacher and retired after serving 27 years as the principal of Zahira College, Colombo. Under his stewardship, Zahira College became one of the leading schools in the country.

Jayah emerged as a leader of the Muslim and Malay community of the country. He entered the politics and became a prominent figure in pre-independence politics of Sri Lanka. He was elected to the legislative council, state council and parliament. He was also a founding member of the United National Party. He became the minister of Labour and Social Service in the first independent government of Sri Lanka. After retiring form politics, Jayah was appointed as the first High Commissioner for Ceylon in Pakistan. He died in 1960, falling ill on pilgrimage to Mecca.

== Early life ==
Tuan Burhanudeen Jayah was born in Galagedara on 1 January 1890, as the son of Nona and Cassim Jayah. The Jayah family belonged to Malay ethnic minority group in Sri Lanka. Cassim Jayah was employed in the police department as a sergeant.

=== Early education ===
When Jayah was young, his family moved to Kurunegala due to his father's transfer. He attended his first school was the Anglo-Vernacular School in Kurunegala. During this period, he also received his Quranic Education under the tutelage of Noordeen Alim and Omarlebbe. Cassim was once again transferred, this time to Colombo. Jayah attended the St. Paul's College, Kandy, where he received most of his primary education. He had to be enrolled to Grade 1 at the age of ten. However, the young student was found to be so brilliant that he was awarded a treble promotion from Grade 1 to Grade 4 and once again a double promotion to Grade 6 in the following year. In 1904, he obtained a scholarship to S. Thomas' College, Mount Lavinia for his secondary education. He passed Cambridge Junior and Cambridge Senior examinations with merits.

=== School teacher ===
Jayah passed London Matriculation and Inter Arts Examinations which helped him to become a school teacher. He obtained his first appointment at Dharmaraja College, Kandy in January 1910. His first monthly salary was Rs. 40.

In 1917, he shifted to Ananda College, Colombo after accepting an invitation from P. D. S. Kularatne, who was the principal at that time. Jayah mainly taught History and Classics at school.

While being a teacher, he continued his academic pursuit and obtained a degree in Classics from the University of London. Then he enrolled at Law College to become a lawyer.

== Zahira College ==
While studying in the final year in the Law College, in 1921, Jayah assumed duties as the principal of Zahira College, Colombo, accepting an invitation by the local Muslim and Malay community. The actual invitation was made by N H M Abdul Cader, on behalf of the Maradana Mosque Committee. Jayah gave up his future career as a lawyer and decided to remain in the education sector, where he seemed to believe that he can make a valuable contribution to his community.

When Jayah assumed duties, Zahira College was in a poor state with few students and teachers, lack of buildings to house class rooms, lack of furniture, and surroundings that were not suitable for a school. Jayah made some significant achievements during his tenure as the principal. He started the classes up to Matriculation level; increased the number of teachers from 6 to 30; expanded the sport facilities; opened a science library, a canteen, a hostel, a dental clinic and a free night school. (The night school he opened up is considered as the first of its kind in the country.) Also, he started funds such as "College Extension Fund" to develop infrastructure such as buildings. The number of students climbed up from 59 to over 1,000 within four years.

Jayah served 27 years as the principal of Zahira College until his retirement in 1948. Jayah's tenure as the principal is generally considered as the golden age of the Zahira College. During this era, the school produced some prominent figures at national level.

=== Branches ===
Jayah was instrumental in opening several branches of Zahira College. In 1942, the first branch was opened in Dharga Town (Zahira College, Dharga Town) to address the difficulties students from the South of Ceylon faced in continuing their studies in Colombo due to the outbreak of the Second World War, followed by the Gampola branch in 1944. Three other branches were opened in 1945 in Matale, Puttalam and Slave Island.

== Muslim Leadership ==
Jayah gradually emerged as a leader of the Muslim community of the country. After the demise of N. H. M. Abdul Cader, Jayah was appointed as the president of the All Ceylon Muslim League. He continued as the president until 1950.

== Political career ==
=== Legislative Council ===
In 1924, for the first time in the history, an election was held to select members for the Legislative Council from Mohammedan (Muslim) electorate. The Mohammedan electorate was an island-wide communal electorate which represented the Muslim and Malay community of the whole country. However, only a limited number of citizens had the voting rights during this time period. Jayah was elected for the Legislative Council along with two others from this electorate.

=== State Council ===
In 1931, after the Donoughmore Constitution, all adult citizens of the country were granted voting rights to elect members for the State Council. Jayah contested for the Colombo Central electorate, but was defeated by a prominent politician, the Ceylon Labour Party leader, A.E. Goonesinha. He was again defeated by the same opponent in 1936 election. However, despite his defeat, he was nominated to the state council, in 1936, and he continued as a member until 1947.

In the state council, Jayah was selected to the executive committee of education. This gave him a wide scope to advance Muslim education in the country. He, along with his fellow Muslim state council member Sir Razik Fareed, established many Muslim schools around the island. Also, Jayah fought for the rights of the school teachers. He was largely responsible for establishing the pension scheme for school teachers.

In the state council, Jayah and other state council members, who were from ethnic groups other than Sinhala, formed a "minority group". They were particularly concerned about the rights of Tamil and Muslim people of the country. However, the "fifty-fifty" campaign carried out by one Tamil state council member G.G.Ponnambalam, was not supported by all of the members in this minority group.

=== United National Party ===
Jayah was instrumental in founding the United National Party. In the inaugural meeting held at Palmcourt, Albert Crescent, Colombo on 6 September 1946, Jayah seconded the proposal made by S. Natesan to unite several political fronts as a single party. The party was formed by uniting the National Congress, the Sinhala Maha Sabha, the All Ceylon Muslim League which was under the leadership of Jayah, the Moors Association which was under the leadership of Sir Razik Fareed, and some individual members of the Tamil and Burgher communities. Jayah was elected as one of five vice-chairmen of the party in this inaugural meeting.

=== Parliament and Cabinet ===
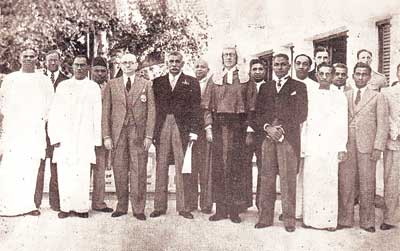
Cabinet of Ceylon in 1947

In 1947 parliamentary election, the Colombo Central electorate was made a multi-member electorate in order to get a balanced representation of the several communities that exist in the electorate. A.E. Goonesinha obtained 23,470 votes and was elected as the first member. Jayah was elected as the second member obtaining 18,439 votes.

Jayah was also selected for the first cabinet of the independent Ceylon, which consisted of only 14 members. He was appointed as the minister of Labour and Social Service.

In 1950, Jayah resigned from the house of representatives and from his post as the cabinet minister to assume duties as the first high commissioner to Pakistan. He served seven years in this post.

== Death ==
Jayah died in 1960, falling ill on pilgrimage to Makkah in Saudi Arabia.

== See also ==
- Sri Lankan Non Career Diplomats
