= Colombo Central Electoral District =

Electoral district of Sri Lanka

Coordinates: 6.9319°N 79.8478°E

Colombo Central electoral district was an electoral district of Sri Lanka between August 1947 and February 1989. The district was named after the city of Colombo in Colombo District, Western Province. The district was one of three multi-member constituencies, with three members, the others were Balangoda and Kadugannawa. was a three-member constituency. The 1978 Constitution of Sri Lanka introduced the proportional representation electoral system for electing members of Parliament. The existing 160 mainly single-member electoral districts were replaced with 22 multi-member electoral districts. Colombo Central electoral district was replaced by the Colombo multi-member electoral district at the 1989 general elections, the first under the PR system, though Colombo Central continues to be a polling division of the multi-member electoral district.

== Members of Parliament ==
Key

Communist Party SLFP UNP Ceylon Labour Party

Election	Member 1	Party	Term	Member 2	Party	Term	Member 3	Party	Term
1947	A. E. Goonesinha	LP	1947–1952	T.B. Jayah	UNP	1947–1952	Pieter Keuneman	CPC	1947-1977
1952	M. C. M. Kaleel	UNP	1952–1960	Razik Fareed	UNP	1952–1960	Pieter Keuneman	CPC	1947-1977
1956	M. S. Themis	MEP–SLFP		Razik Fareed	UNP	1952–1960	Pieter Keuneman	CPC	1947-1977
1960 (March)	M. C. M. Kaleel	UNP	1960–1965	Ranasinghe Premadasa	UNP	1960	Pieter Keuneman	CPC	1947-1977
1960 (July)	M. C. M. Kaleel	UNP	1960–1965	Razik Fareed	UNP	1960–1965	Pieter Keuneman	CPC	1947-1977
1965	Falil Caffoor	UNP	1965–1977	Ranasinghe Premadasa	UNP	1965–1989	Pieter Keuneman	CPC	1947-1977
1970	Falil Caffoor	UNP	1965–1977	Ranasinghe Premadasa	UNP	1965–1989	Pieter Keuneman	CPC	1947-1977
1977	M. Jabir A. Cader	UNP	1977–1989	Ranasinghe Premadasa	UNP	1965–1989	Haleem Ishak	SLFP	1977–1989

== Elections ==
=== 1947 Parliamentary General Election ===
Results of the 1st parliamentary election held between 23 August 1947 and 20 September 1947 for the district:

Candidate	Party	Symbol	Votes	%
A. E. Goonesinha	Labour Party	Bicycle	23,470	22.84
T. B. Jayah	United National Party	Cartwheel	18,439	17.94
Pieter Keuneman	Communist Party	Umbrella	15,435	15.02
M. H. M. Munas		House	8,600	8.37
Ayisha Rauff	Independent	Tree	8,486	8.26
V. J. Perera		Elephant	5,950	5.79
V. A. Sugathadasa	United National Party	Lamp	4,898	4.77
G.W. Harry de Silva		Scales	4,141	4.03
V. A. Kandiah		Clock	3,391	3.30
S. Sarawanamuttu		Chair	2,951	2.87
P. Givendrasingha		Hand	1,569	1.53
K. Dahanayake		Cup	997	0.97
K. Weeraiah		Key	352	0.34
K. C. F. Deen		Star	345	0.34
N. R. Perera		Butterfly	259	0.25
Valid Votes			99,283	96.61
Rejected Votes			3,489	3.39
Total Polled			102,772	100.00
Registered Electors			55,994	
Turnout			183.54	

=== 1950 Parliamentary by-election ===
Following the resignation of Tuan Burhanudeen Jayah a parliamentary by-election for his seat was held on 6 May 1950:

Candidate	Party	Symbol	Votes	%
M. C. M. Kaleel	United National Party	House	14,796	46.85
S. A. Wickremasinghe	Communist Party	Umbrella	12,501	39.59
M. S. Abubaker		Elephant	2,768	3.90
Ayisha Rauf		Star	1,232	17.74%
Valid Votes			31,297	99.11
Rejected Votes			282	0.89
Total Polled			31,579	100
Registered Electors			55,994	
Turnout				56.40

=== 1952 Parliamentary General Election ===
Results of the 2nd parliamentary election held between 24 May 1952 and 30 May 1952 for the district:

Candidate	Party	Symbol	Votes	%
Pieter Keuneman	Communist Party	Umbrella	32,346	27.28%
M. C. M. Kaleel	United National Party	House	25,647	21.63%
Razik Fareed	United National Party	Key	24,911	21.01%
A. E. Goonesinha	Labour Party	Bicycle	19,843	16.74%
P. de S. Kularatne	Sri Lanka Freedom Party	Elephant	14,556	12.28%
Piyaseela Givendrasingha		Hand	751	0.63%
H.L. Perera		Star	517	0.44%
Valid Votes			118,570	100.00%
Rejected Votes			4,217	
Total Polled			122,788	
Registered Electors			58,400	
Turnout			210.25%	

=== 1956 Parliamentary General Election ===
Results of the 3rd parliamentary election held between 5 April 1956 and 10 April 1956 for the district:

Candidate	Party	Symbol	Votes	%
Pieter Keuneman	Communist Party	Star	45,296	30.62%
Razik Fareed	United National Party	Umbrella	26,512	17.92%
M. S. Themis	Mahajana Eksath Peramuna	Hand	20,378	13.77%
M. C. M. Kaleel	United National Party	Cartwheel	20,338	13.75%
V. A. Sugathadasa	United National Party	Elephant	18,234	12.33%
A. E. Goonesinha	Labour Party	Bicycle	16,678	11.27%
A. Ally Mohamood		Flower	501	0.34%
Valid Votes			147,937	100.00%
Rejected Votes			3,901	
Total Polled			151,838	
Registered Electors			70,022	
Turnout			216.84%	

=== 1960 (March) Parliamentary General Election ===
Results of the 4th parliamentary election held on 19 March 1960 for the district:

Candidate	Party	Symbol	Votes	%
M. C. M. Kaleel	United National Party	Pair of Spectacles	33,121	19.02%
Pieter Keuneman	Communist Party	Star	30,574	17.56%
Ranasinghe Premadasa	United National Party	Elephant	29,828	17.13%
P.B. Thampoe	Lanka Sama Samaja Party	Key	22,228	12.76%
Razik Fareed	United National Party	Umbrella	21,033	12.08%
M. S. Themis	Mahajana Eksath Peramuna	Cartwheel	19,093	10.96%
E. S. Ratnaweera	Sri Lanka Freedom Party	Hand	11,859	6.81%
Abdul Aziz		Tree	4,635	2.66%
D. J. S. Paranayapa		Lamp	414	0.24%
Vasanta Appadurai		Ship	404	0.23%
Cecil Wickremasinghe		Eye	397	0.23%
A. Kumarasinghe		Flower	220	0.13%
Premaranjan Lokeshvara		Table	171	0.10%
A. A. Mohamed		Pot	166	0.10%
Valid Votes			174,143	100.00%
Rejected Votes			4,592	
Total Polled			178,735	
Registered Electors			74,922	
Turnout			238.56%	

=== 1960 (July) Parliamentary General Election ===
Results of the 5th parliamentary election held on 20 July 1960 for the district:

Candidate	Party	Symbol	Votes	%
Razik Fareed	Sri Lanka Freedom Party	Hand	45,342	25.75%
Pieter Keuneman	Communist Party	Star	38,663	21.96%
M. C. M. Kaleel	United National Party	Eye	37,486	21.29%
Ranasinghe Premadasa	United National Party	Elephant	35,035	19.90%
Bala Tampoe	Lanka Sama Samaja Party	Key	16,406	9.32%
M. S. Themis		Cartwheel	3,164	1.80%
Valid Votes			176,096	100.00%
Rejected Votes			3,488	
Total Polled			179,584	
Registered Electors			74,922	
Turnout			239.69%	

=== 1965 Parliamentary General Election ===
Results of the 6th parliamentary election held on 22 March 1965 for the district:

Candidate	Party	Symbol	Votes	%
Falil Caffoor	United National Party	Chair	68,372	31.54%
Ranasinghe Premadasa	United National Party	Elephant	64,438	29.72%
Pieter Keuneman	Communist Party (Moscow)	Star	41,478	19.13%
M. Haleem Ishak	Sri Lanka Freedom Party	Hand	32,132	14.82%
Bala Tampoe		Lamp	4,559	2.10%
D. A. Piyadasa	Mahajana Eksath Peramuna	Cartwheel	2,520	1.16%
N. Shanmugathasan	Communist Party (Peking)	Umbrella	2,427	1.12%
O. S. A. Z. Abdeen		Flower	332	0.15%
Poopathy Saravanamuttu		Ship	282	0.13%
R. H. Jayasekera		Scales	268	0.12%
Valid Votes			216,808	100.00%
Rejected Votes			4,638	
Total Polled			221,446	
Registered Electors			93,468	
Turnout			236.92%	

=== 1970 Parliamentary General Election ===
Results of the 7th parliamentary election held on 27 May 1970 for the district:

Candidate	Party	Symbol	Votes	%
Ranasinghe Premadasa	United National Party	Elephant	69,310	29.48%
Falil Caffoor	United National Party	Chair	63,624	27.06%
Pieter Keuneman	Communist Party	Star	58,557	24.91%
M. Haleem Ishak	Sri Lanka Freedom Party	Hand	41,716	17.74%
C. Durairajah		Umbrella	783	0.33%
M. Haroun Careem		Bell	413	0.18%
Poopathy Saravanamuttu		Ship	396	0.17%
Panangadan Raman Krishnan		Scales	307	0.13%
Valid Votes			235,106	100.00%
Rejected Votes			5,491	
Total Polled			240,597	
Registered Electors			99,265	
Turnout			242.38%	

=== 1977 Parliamentary General Election ===
Results of the 8th parliamentary election held on 21 July 1977 for the district:

Candidate	Party	Symbol	Votes	%
Ranasinghe Premadasa	United National Party	Elephant	94,128	36.32%
M. Jabir A. Cader	United National Party	Eye	58,972	22.76%
M. Haleem Ishak	Sri Lanka Freedom Party	Hand	53,777	20.75%
M. S. Sellasamy	Ceylon Workers' Congress	Cockerel	26,964	10.41%
Pieter Keuneman	Communist Party	Star	24,568	9.48%
W. A. Sunil Perera		Chair	422	0.16%
R. Rathnasamy		Flower	202	0.08%
M. T. M. Saleem		Table	103	0.04%
Valid Votes			259,136	100.00%
Rejected Votes			6,660	
Total Polled			265,796	
Registered Electors			106,403	
Turnout			249.80%	
