= Sucharitha =

General information
- Location: Colombo, Sri Lanka

Sucharitha was the home of Ranasinghe Premadasa, former President of Sri Lanka. It was the headquarters of his Sri Sucharitha Movement. Premadasa remained at Sucharitha even after being elected president, using President's House, Colombo only for official functions.

Premadasa hosted LTTE leaders at Sucharitha for peace talks in 1989. Following his death, it has been turned into a social services center with the Sucharitha Hall and Sucharitha Library serving the public.

== See also ==
- Vaijantha
