= Pieter Keuneman =

Sri Lankan politician and Marxist

Hon. Pieter Keuneman

Minister of Housing and Local Government
- In office 31 May 1970 – February 1977

Member of the Ceylon Parliament for Colombo Central
- In office 20 September 1947 – 21 July 1977
- Succeeded by: Haleem Ishak

Personal details
- Born: 3 October 1917 Colombo, Ceylon
- Died: 3 January 1997 (aged 79) Colombo, Sri Lanka
- Party: Communist Party
- Education: Pembroke College, Cambridge

Pieter Gerald Bartholomeusz Keuneman (3 October 1917 – 3 January 1997) was a Sri Lankan politician and a Marxist. He was the Cabinet Minister of Housing and Local Government, a prominent Member of Parliament and a leading figure in the Communist Party of Sri Lanka (CPSL).

== Early life and education ==
Pieter Keuneman came from a Dutch Burgher family. He was born to Hon. Justice Arthur Eric Keuneman, a distinguished judge of the Supreme Court, and Majorie Eleanor Schokman, daughter of a wealthy medical doctor from Kandy, George Peter Schokman, M.B., C.M. (Aber.), Provincial Surgeon, Ceylon Medical Department.

Keuneman was educated at the Royal College, Colombo where he was the head of the junior cadet platoon, prefect, captain of the debating team and president of the literary association. He won college colours at rugger and won the Dornhorst Memorial Prize and the Shakespeare prize. He went on to Pembroke College, Cambridge, in 1935 where he became a communist, President of the Cambridge Union and editor of the student magazine Granta. He gained a BA Tripos in History, Sociology and English Literature and joined the Gray's Inn to study law, leaving without taking his bar examinations. Later he gained a MA from Cambridge.

While at Cambridge he worked briefly for the Daily Express, before leaving for Spain to fight against Francisco Franco in the Spanish Civil War. At Cambridge he met his first wife, Hedi Stadlen, who became one of the leading European Radicals in Sri Lanka.

== Political career ==
On returning to Ceylon he worked as a features editor at Lake House. He was an architect of the United Socialist Party which was formed in 1940. He was its secretary and after it was proscribed by Admiral Geoffrey Layton, the Communist Party of Ceylon was formed at 'Cotta' Road in 1943. He became a member of the National Congress in 1945. During the 1940s he was the Secretary of the Communist Party and launched the journal Forward of which he was the editor in 1944. Even though he contested and lost elections for the Colombo Municipal Council in 1943, he won the Kotahena ward in 1947 holding it until 1959. In that capacity he agitated for better housing, eradication of slums and shanties in the Colombo city and saw to the setting up of libraries and dispensaries.

He contested the first parliamentary elections in 1947 from the Colombo Central constituency and was returned as the third member of parliament obtaining 15,435 votes. On his proposal in June 1948 for a Bribery Commission, the first Bribery and Corruption Commission was formed chaired by his father Justice A.E. Keuneman. In the 1952 elections, he was elected as the first MP for Colombo Central electorate defeating the labour party leader A.E. Goonesinghe and retained his seat in the 1956, 1960 and 1970 elections. He was very critical of the 1962 coup d'état attempt and the 1971 JVP Insurrection.

In 1970, in the government of Sirimavo Bandaranaike, he held the portfolio of Housing and Construction as a Cabinet Minister. The establishment of the State Engineering Corporation and many housing schemes was his brainchild. He introduced a controversial floor area limit of 300 square metres on all new private houses. However he lost his seat in the 1977 election and retired from politics.

== Family ==
He married his first wife Hedi Stadlen after graduating from Cambridge. In 1945, Hedi returned to Europe to meet her mother. In London in 1946 she met an old friend from Vienna, Peter Stadlen a distinguished concert pianist. She chose not to return to Ceylon, divorced Pieter and subsequently married Stadlen. In 1952, Keuneman married his second wife Maud Rogerson, a communist activist. His third wife was Ouida Keuneman, with whom he lived out his days.

== See also ==
- Communist Party of Sri Lanka
