= Jabir Cader =

Sri Lankan politician

Al-Hajj Mohamed Jabir Abdul Cader (20 January 1916 – 28 June 2002) was a Sri Lankan politician. He was a former State Minister, member of parliament for Colombo Central and Mayor of Colombo.

A founder member of All Ceylon Muslim League, he was elected to the Colombo Municipal Council and was elected Mayor serving from 1966 to 1969. He was elected to parliament form the Colombo Central with the highest preferential votes after Ranasinghe Premadasa in the 1977 general election and was reelected in the 1989 general election. He was appointed by President Premadasa as State Minister of for Muslim Religious and Cultural Affairs from 1989 to 1990 and State Minister for Health from 1990 to 1993.
