= Arthur Eric Keuneman =

Ceylonese (Sri Lankan) judge and lawyer

Arthur Eric Keuneman KC

Puisne Justice of the Supreme Court of Ceylon

Personal details
- Education: Royal College Colombo, University of Cambridge

Arthur Eric Keuneman I, KC (1885-) was a Ceylonese (Sri Lankan) judge and lawyer. He was a puisne justice of the Supreme Court of Ceylon.

He was educated at the Royal College Colombo and at the University of Cambridge. He was called to bar at the Gray's Inn.

Keuneman married Majorie Eleanor Shockman, daughter of a Surgeon from Kandy. They had two children, Pieter Keuneman who became a Cabinet Minister and Arthur Eric Keuneman II (Jnr) a Crown Counsel in the Attorney-General's Department.
