= M. S. Sellasamy =

Sri Lankan politician (1926–2020)

Hon. M. S. Sellasamy
- மு. ச. செல்லச்சாமி

Member of Parliament for Colombo District
- In office 1989–1994

Member of Parliament for National List
- In office 2000–2001
- In office 2004–2010

Member of the Western Provincial Council
- In office 1988–1989

Personal details
- Born: 13 November 1926
- Died: August 1, 2020 (aged 93) Bambalapitiya, Colombo, Sri Lanka
- Party: Ceylon Workers' Congress
- Other political affiliations: United People's Freedom Alliance
- Occupation: Trade unionist

Muthu Sangaralingam Sellasamy (Tamil: முத்து சங்கரலிங்கம் செல்லச்சாமி; 13 November 1926 – 1 August 2020) was a Sri Lankan trade unionist, politician and former minister of state.

== Early life ==
Sellasamy was born on 13 November 1926.

== Career ==
Sellasamy was district chairman of the Ceylon Workers' Congress (CWC) before being elected its general-secretary in 1963. He was also president of the Estate Staff Congress, Ceylon Teachers' Congress and Lanka Agriculturists Association.

Sellasamy was the CWC's candidate in Colombo Central at the 1977 parliamentary election but failed to get elected. He was an executive member of the Colombo District Development Council from 1981 to 1988. He contested the 1988 provincial council election and was elected to the Western Provincial Council. He was appointed Minister of Health and Economic Infrastructure.

Sellasamy was one of the CWC/UNP alliance's candidates in Colombo District at the 1989 parliamentary election. He was elected and entered Parliament. He was appointed Minister of State for Transport on 18 February 1989. He became Minister of State for Industries on 30 March 1990.

Sellasamy was removed as general-secretary of the CWC in 1994 and subsequently formed the Ceylon National Workers' Congress (CNWC). A long legal battle ensued between Sellasamy and CWC leader Savumiamoorthy Thondaman which prevented the CWC from using its "Cockerel" symbol to contest elections. Following the death of Thondaman in 1999 Sellasamy tried unsuccessfully to gain the leadership of the CWC from Thondaman's grandson Arumugam Thondaman.

Sellasamy was appointed as one of the CNWC/DWC/UCPF/UNP alliance's National List MP's in the Sri Lankan Parliament following the 2000 parliamentary election.

Sellasamy rejoined the CWC in October 2001 as its deputy president. He contested the 2001 parliamentary election as one of the United National Front's (UNF) candidates in Colombo District but failed to get elected. He was appointed as one of the UNF's National List MP's in the Sri Lankan Parliament following the 2004 parliamentary election. He was appointed Deputy Minister of Posts in January 2007.

Sellasamy was a member of the University of Colombo's senate and the National Agricultural Diversification and Settlement Authority (NADSA).

== Electoral history ==
Electoral history of M. S. Sellasamy
Election	Constituency	Party	Votes	Result
1977 parliamentary	Colombo Central	CWC	26,964	Not elected
1989 parliamentary	Colombo Central	CWC	36,480	Elected
2001 parliamentary	Colombo Central	UNF		Not elected
