= Falil Caffoor =

Ceylonese businessmen and politician

Al-Hajj Mohamed Falil Abdul Caffoor, MBE (20 March 1907 - 31 March 1980) was a Ceylonese businessmen and politician. A successful gem merchant, he was the member of parliament for Colombo Central and member of the Colombo Municipal Council.

Born as the eldest son of Noor Deen Hajiar Abdul Caffoor, a successful gem merchant and owner of the Gaffoor Building in Colombo. Falil Caffoor, was educated at S. Thomas' College and joined the family business. In 1954, he was appointed a Member of the Order of the British Empire in the 1954 Birthday Honours for his services for commerce. In 1965, he was elected to the Colombo Municipal Council and was shortly elected to parliament form the Colombo Central with the highest preferential votes in the 1965 general election and was reelected in the 1970 general election. He later served as a Director of the Bank of Ceylon and the Honorary Consul for Iraq to Sri Lanka.
