= A. Ekanayake Gunasinha =

Sri Lankan trade unionist and politician

Hon. A. E. Goonesingha ඒ. ඊ. ගුණසිංහ
- A. E. Gunasinha

6th Mayor of Colombo
- In office 1940–1943
- Preceded by: Dr. V.R. Schockman
- Succeeded by: George R. De Silva

Minister without Portfolio
- In office 17 May 1948 – 30 April 1952

Minister of State
- In office 26 July 1948 – 30 April 1952

Member of the Ceylon Parliament for Colombo Central
- In office 20 September 1947 – 30 May 1952
- Succeeded by: Razik Fareed

Ceylon's Ambassador to Burma and Indonesia
- In office 1954–1956

Personal details
- Born: 1 May 1891 Kandy, British Ceylon
- Died: 1 August 1967 (aged 76) Colombo, Ceylon
- Party: Ceylon Labour Party
- Education: Dharmaraja College, Kandy; St. Joseph's College, Colombo; Wesley College, Colombo
- Occupation: Politician
- Profession: Trade union leader
- Sri Lanka's "Father of the Labour Movement"

Alexander Ekanayaka Goonesingha (1 May 1891 – 1 August 1967) was a Sri Lankan trade unionist and politician. A pioneering trade union leader, known as the "Father of the Labour Movement", he was the founder of the Ceylon Labour Party, Sri Lanka's first labour organisation. A former mayor of Colombo, he served as the Minister without portfolio, Minister of State and Chief Government Whip in the First Parliament of Sri Lanka and Ceylon's Ambassador to Burma and Indonesia.

== Early life ==
A. E. Gunasinha was born 1 May 1891 in Kandy as the son of a tea estate superintendent, George Ekanayake Gunasinha. He first attended Dharmaraja College and completed his education at St. Joseph's College, Colombo and Wesley College, Colombo. Upon completion of his studies, he sought employment as a clerk in the Ceylon railway department, but later turned his attention to journalism.

He was prominent in forming the "Young Lanka League" on 2 March 1915 along with barrister C. H. Z. Fernando, Edwin Wijeyeratne, A. P. Thambayah and Valantine Perera, later joined by Victor Corea, a lawyer from Chilaw in the fight against colonialism. He also formed the Gandhi Association – inspired by the Indian independence movement – and the Lanka Workers' Association.

The 1915 riots resulted in the imprisonment of Gunasinha in May 1915, along with leaders with the likes of F.R. Senanayake, D.B. Jayatilaka, D. S. Senanayake, and many others including C. A. Hewavitharana and Henry Pedris, who was shot under martial law for crimes he did not commit. After being released from prison on 15 August, Gunasinha started the Journal The Nation to support the national freedom fight.

His association with Anagarika Dharmapala, made him join the Temperance Movement and he made a significant impact on the Revivalist movement as well.

== Advocate of the poor ==
Gunasinha did his best to help the poor by guiding them on how to improve their qualities of life. In his desire to educate the uneducated, he started education programs launching night schools for Ceylon's shanty dwellers. He set in motion social service programs which were of immense benefit to the poor.

The colonial government which ruled Ceylon at the time levied a tax of Rs. 2.00 per year starting in the 1890s. Those who did not pay had to work on the roads for one day in lieu of the tax. Gunasinha campaigned against the tax and convinced his members of the "Young Lanka League" not to pay the tax and instead work on the road. Gunasinha himself joined the movement, breaking rocks by hand between 8:00 AM and 4:30 PM with a recess time of half-an-hour for lunch. The revolt against the tax grew and it was repealed in 1923 on a motion by C.H.Z. Fernando in the Legislative Council of Ceylon.

== Trade union leader ==
The campaign against the tax brought Gunasinha into contact with Ceylonese workers. He found that the workers were poorly paid, with wages averaging between 30 cts. to Rs. 1.00 for a day's work, sometimes as long as twelve hours. He was determined to get the working class better and more equitable wages. As a result, members of the working class looked to Gunasinha as the leader they had longed for.

=== Organizing trade unions ===
Gunasinha organised Sri Lanka's first trade union, the "Ceylon Labour Union" in 1922. Initial membership was approximately 25. Gunasinha was the secretary; longtime partner Victor Corea was made President. Some months after the formation of the union, Gunasinha assumed duties as president. That trade union is known today as the Ceylon Mercantile Union (aka "Ceylon Mercantile Industrial and General Workers' Union") and was led by Bala Tampoe till his death in 2014. Tampoe was one of the seniormost trade unionists in the country, having been part of the movement since 1948.

In 1928, Gunasinha was instrumental in forming the "All Ceylon Labour Union Congress", and later in 1935 the "Ceylon Trade Union Congress" was formed by the amalgamation of several Unions including the Ceylon Mercantile of which he was the President for 20 years. Reaching the workers, educating them about their rights and privileges, holding propaganda meetings he swelled the membership of the CLU.

=== Government Railway strike (1923) ===
Mr. Gunasinha led a series of successful strikes, and the first General Strike occurred in February 1923, when the Government Railway struck, and was joined by numerous other Unions. In total 25,000 workers were supplied with free meals for 56 days. The Strike was a great success, and a Commission appointed by the British Governor Sir William Henry Manning, recommended a 20% increase in Salaries and Casual & Sick leave grants. But the government was hard on the strikers and severe punishments were imposed on them upon returning to work. That resulted in nearly 25,000 workers in the Colombo Harbour, Colombo Municipality, Wellawatte Spinning & Weaving Mills, Government Factory and several government departments coming out on strike. The strike which continued for nearly five weeks ended eventually, with the workers trekking back to work.

=== Harbour Workers' strike (1927) ===
Though the battle was lost, the workers remained defiant and working class unity was strengthened. Gunasinha next led a strike of the Colombo Harbour workers in February 1927 demanding a wage increase of 50 cts (from Rs. 1.50 to Rs. 2.00) per day and a lunch interval of one hour. The strike resulted in a wage increase by 25 cts. and the granting of a 15-minute interval for lunch.

=== Tramcar Workers' strike (1929) ===
He next launched the strike by Tramcar Workers on 23 January 1929. In retaliation, European Planters and Executives drove Tram Cars and this sparked off trouble. The Late President J.R. Jayewardene, who was then a student, joined the many other helpers to transport the crowds of people who boycotted travelling in Tarm Cars. These anti-strike measures adopted by Whittal Bousteads which owned the Tramcar Service, resulted in the strikers in appealing to the public, not to patronise tramcars or purchase goods marketed by the company. The appeal received support of the consumers and the students too joined in support of the workers. As the strike progressed, due to Police harassment of the strikers, it spread to other institutions and demonstrations followed. This resulted in clashes between the demonstrators and the Police. On 5 February 1929, a clash took place between the Police and the Strikers, and the Maradana Police Station was set on fire. That forced the employers to come to the negotiating table and the strike started by 150 tramcar employees after 13 days ended with a negotiated settlement.

=== Galle Face Hotel and Lake House strikes ===
He also led strikes at the Times and the Galle Face Hotel which strikes too were not successful. Though the strikers failed, trade unionism gained ground in Ceylon at unprecedented levels. The unsuccessful strike at Lake House in 1929 where Indian workers were brought in to diminish the strike, marked the decline of his power as a trade union leader. The Marxists, thereafter took over the trade union movement, and holds it hitherto.

During Colonial period in which Ceylon was ruled by the British Empire, Gunasinha was brave and courageous to meet any eventuality to fight for the rights of the workers, and due to his daring qualities, he was known among Workers as the "Maha Kalu Sinhaya".

== Labour Day ==
Labour Day or May Day was first held in Ceylon, in 1927 under the leadership of Mr.Gunasinha. The May Day Rally held in 1933 under his leadership had new features introduced. Men wore a white sarong and a red striped banian. Women workers were dressed in red coloured cloth and jacket. There were drummers and dancers. Mr.Gunasinha walked under a red banner, where there was no political slogans displayed or shouted-out. Working class songs being sung, was a conspicuous part of the rally. The demonstrations started from Price Park and the rally was held ultimately at the Galle Face Green.

The first May Day Rally under Marxist leadership in Ceylon was held in 1935. May Day was declared public holiday by the Mahajana Eksath Peramuna Government led by Prime Minister S. W. R. D. Bandaranaike, in 1956.

== Political career ==
Statue of A. E. Gunasinha at Gunasinhapura

=== Ceylon Labour Party ===
Gunasinha's political career marked the formation of the Ceylon Labour Party in October 1928, with himself as president, and Proctor Marshall Perera as secretary, and Messrs. C.E. Corea, C. H. Z. Fernando, C. W. W. Kannangara, George E. de Silva and late President Ranasinghe Premadasa, who was a very eloquent speaker, in the Committee. The CLP was formed, after having had contacts with the Labour Party of Great Britain earlier. In fact when Ramsay MacDonald, the British Labour Party Leader and Prime Minister visited Ceylon in 1926; Gunasinha received him on behalf of the Ceylonese labour movement. He also appeared on behalf of the labour movement at the Donoughmore Commission for Universal Franchise.

Gunasinha accompanied by C. H. Z. Fernando represented Ceylon at the British Empire Labour Conference held in London in 1928. The Labour Party campaigned for the unrestricted granting of Universal Adult Suffrage from the Donoughmore Commission. He along with C. H. Z. Fernando were also responsible for the abolishing of the Poll Tax in 1925.

=== State council ===
He was elected to the State Council of Ceylon in 1931, on the Labour Party ticket as member for Colombo Central Electoral District and was re-elected in 1936 and served till 1942 and was succeeded by M. C. M. Kaleel.

=== Mayor of Colombo ===
He was elected to the Colombo Municipal Council and served as Mayor of Colombo from January 1940 to December 1940.

=== Minister ===
In the 1947 Parliamentary election, he was elected as the first Member for the Colombo Central Electorate (three member seat) in parliament and was appointed Parliamentary Secretary to the Minister of Labour and Social Services, T. B. Jayah. In May 1948, he succeeded Senerat Gunewardene as Minister without Portfolio and Chief Government Whip, when Gunewardene was unseated in an election petition. From July 1948, he received the portfolio of Minister of State and served until April 1952. He contested the 1952 parliamentary election and polled fourth in Colombo Central, losing his seat in parliament.

=== Ambassador to Burma and Indonesia ===
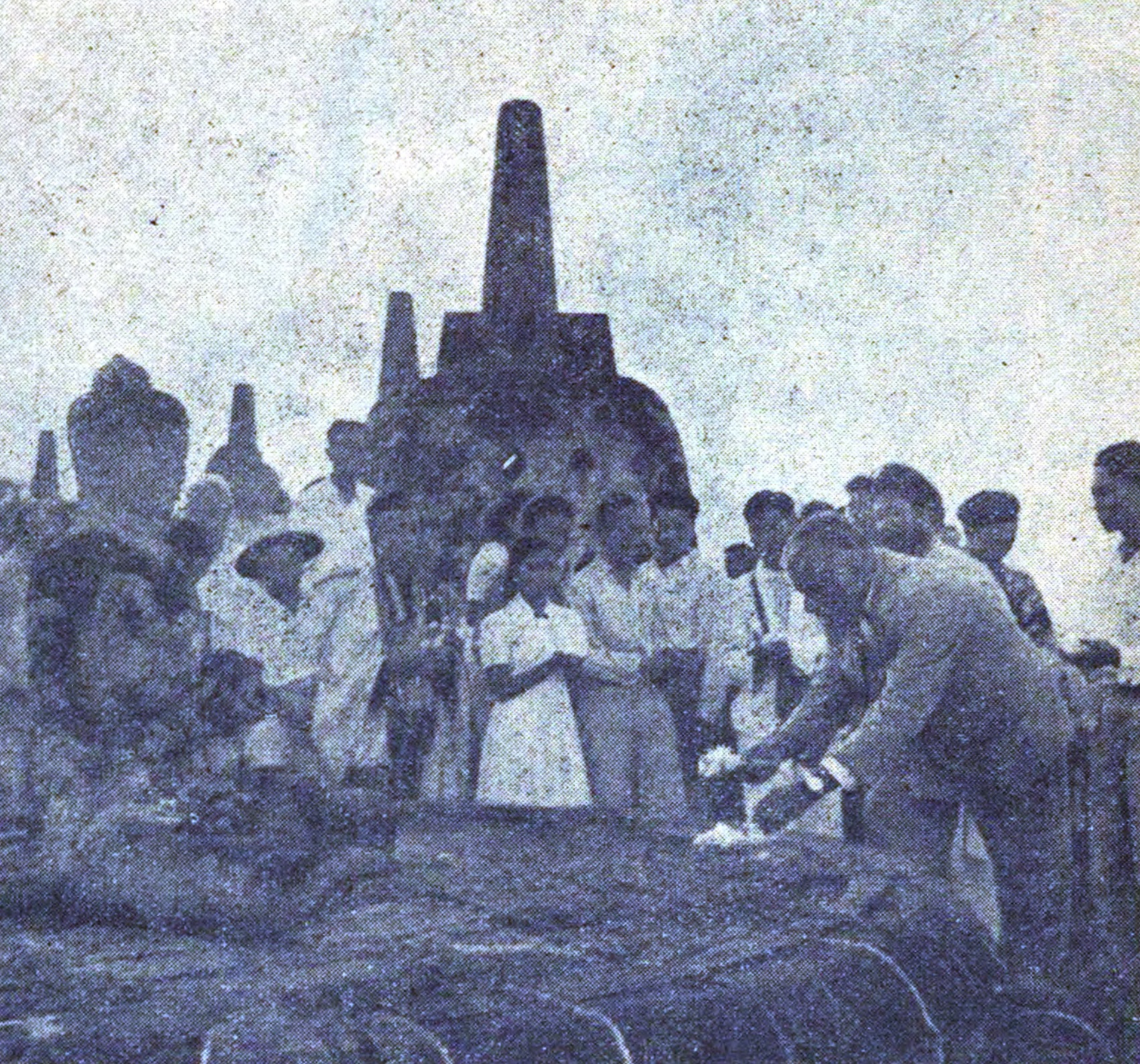
Goonesinha offering flowers at Borobudur while serving as ambassador to Indonesia

In 1954, he was appointed Ceylon's Ambassador to Burma and Indonesia succeeding Sir Velupillai Coomaraswamy, where he served till 1956 when he returned to Ceylon to contest the 1956 parliamentary election and polled sixth in Colombo Central.

== Death and legacy ==
A. E. Gunasinha; prominent freedom fighter, social worker, advocate of the poor, politician and trade union leader is remembered today as the father of the country's Trade Union Movement. This national hero died on 1 August 1967, and was carried through the streets of Colombo by workers, to the cemetery, where he was laid to rest in peace.

Gunasinha's devoted disciple and follower, the President Ranasinghe Premadasa, converted Price Park and the environment in Pettah, as "Gunasinhapura" as a tribute to this leader of the workers. Price Park was where Gunasinha and held the trade union and political meetings led by him, and where large crowds gathered to listen to the eloquent speeches of Gunasinha and other contemporary leaders. This area is now renamed as "Gunasinha Park".

As a mark of honour; his statue has been erected at the entrance to Gunasinha, depicting him with a hammer in hand breaking rock stones for Civil Disobedience in not paying Poll Tax. This statue is garlanded every May Day.

== See also ==
- List of Sri Lankan non-career diplomats
