= Ranasinghe Premadasa =

President of Sri Lanka from 1989 to 1993

His Excellency Sri Lankabhimanya Ranasinghe Premadasa
- රණසිංහ ප්‍රේමදාස ரணசிங்க பிரேமதாசா
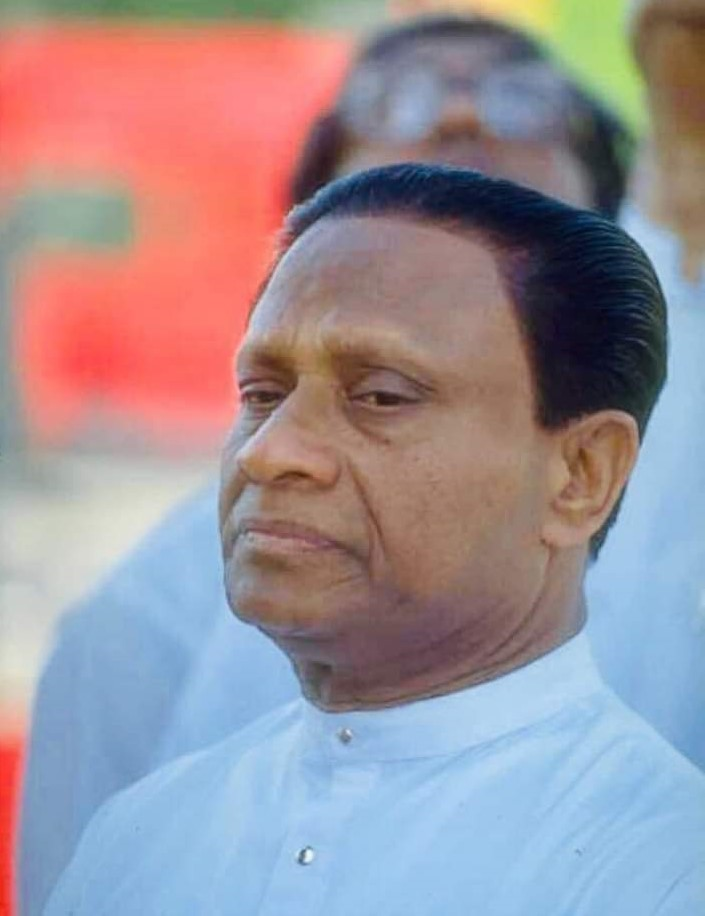
- Premadasa in 1991

3rd President of Sri Lanka
- In office 2 January 1989 – 1 May 1993
- Prime Minister: Dingiri Banda Wijetunga
- Preceded by: J. R. Jayewardene
- Succeeded by: Dingiri Banda Wijetunga

11th Prime Minister of Sri Lanka
- In office 6 February 1978 – 2 January 1989
- President: J. R. Jayewardene
- Preceded by: J. R. Jayewardene
- Succeeded by: Dingiri Banda Wijetunga

Minister of Local Government
- In office 1977–1989
- President: J.R. Jayawardene
- Prime Minister: J.R. Jayawardene; Himself
- Preceded by: W. P. G. Ariyadasa
- Succeeded by: Sirisena Cooray
- In office 1968–1970
- Governor General: William Gopallawa
- Prime Minister: Dudley Senanayake
- Preceded by: Murugeysen Tiruchelvam
- Succeeded by: W. P. G. Ariyadasa

Member of Parliament for Colombo Central
- In office 22 March 1965 – 2 January 1989
- Preceded by: Razik Fareed
- Succeeded by: Constituency abolished
- In office 19 March 1960 – 20 July 1960
- Preceded by: M. S. Themis
- Succeeded by: Razik Fareed

Personal details
- Born: 23 June 1924 Colombo, British Ceylon (now in Sri Lanka)
- Died: 1 May 1993 (aged 68) Colombo, Sri Lanka
- Cause of death: Assassination
- Party: United National Party
- Spouse: Hema Wickrematunge (m. 1964)
- Children: Sajith, Dulanjali
- Education: St Joseph's College, Colombo

Sri Lankabhimanya Ranasinghe Premadasa (Sinhala: රණසිංහ ප්‍රේමදාස Raṇasiṃha Premadāsa; Tamil: ரணசிங்க பிரேமதாசா Raṇaciṅka Pirēmatācā; 23 June 1924 – 1 May 1993) was a Sri Lankan politician who served as the third president of Sri Lanka from 1989 until his assassination in 1993. A longtime member of the United National Party, he previously served as Prime Minister of Sri Lanka from 1978 to 1989, with his tenure making him the longest-serving uninterrupted Prime Minister of Sri Lanka.

Amongst Sri Lankans, Premadasa has left behind a mixed legacy. While he was seen as a spokesperson of the poor, common man, his handling of the country's two civil conflicts, the JVP insurrection and the Sri Lankan civil war, have been heavily criticised. He was the first person to be conferred with the Sri Lankabhimanya, Sri Lanka's highest civilian award, in 1986 by president J. R. Jayewardene.

== Early life ==
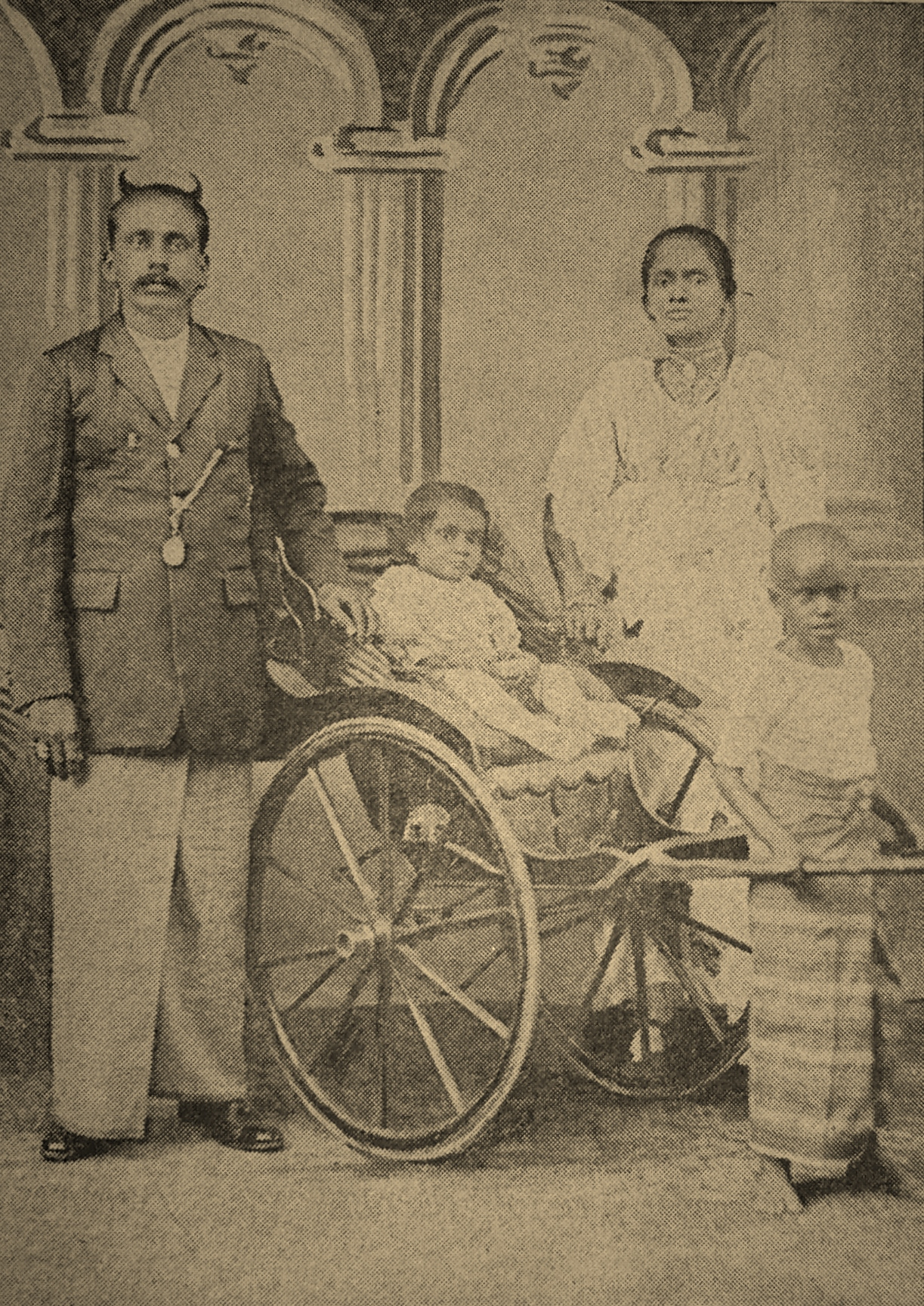
One-year-old R. Premadasa with his parents in 1925

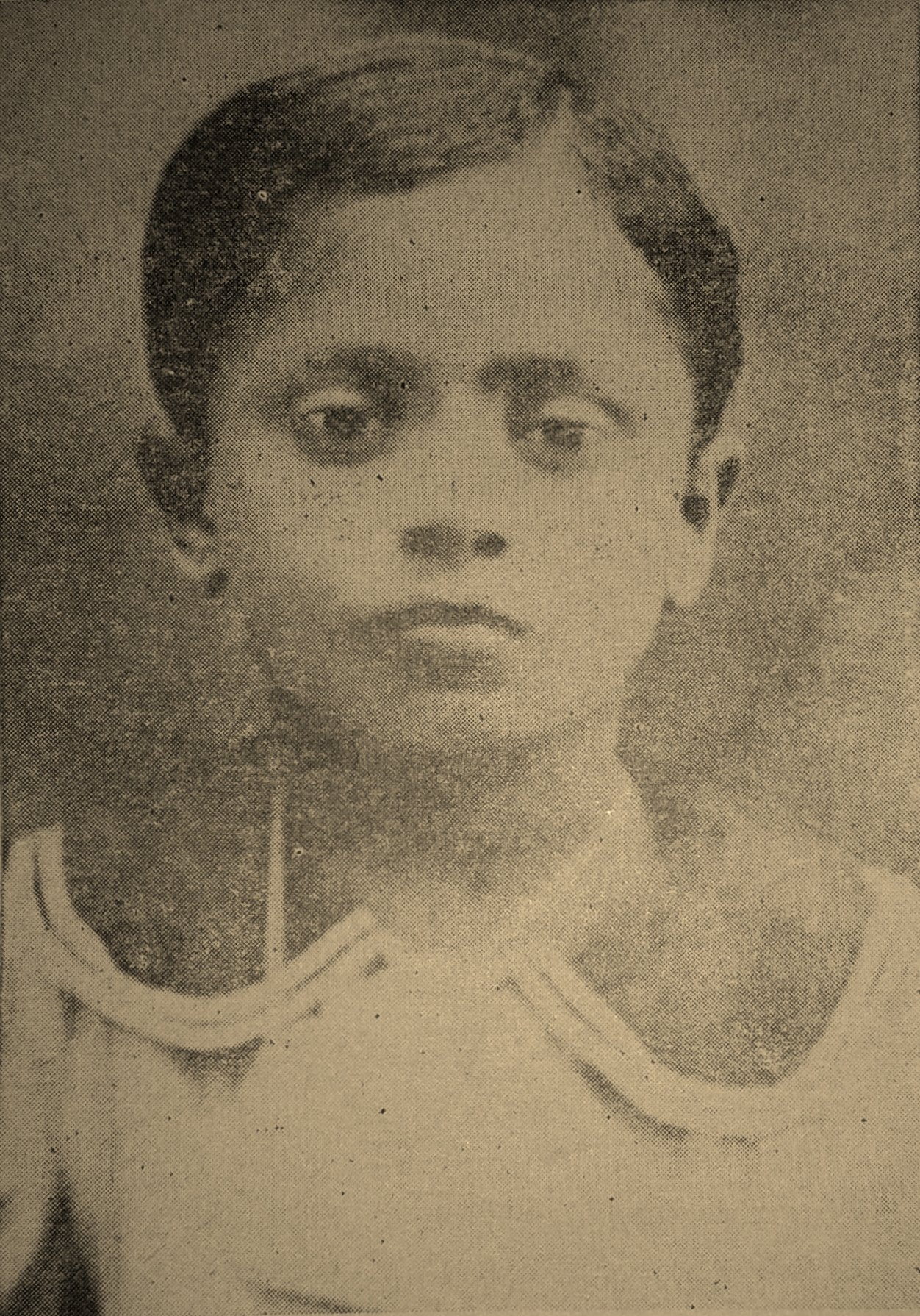
R. Premadasa in 1930

Ranasinghe Premadasa was born on 23 June 1924 at Dias Place, Colombo 11, to the family of Richard Ranasinghe (Ranasinghe Mudalali) of Kosgoda and Battuwita Jayasinghe Arachchige Ensina Hamine of Batuwita, Horana. Premadasa was the oldest of five children, with three sisters and one brother. His father was engaged in the transport business in Colombo employing rickshaws.

He received his early education at the Purwarama temple under Ven. Welitara Sri Pannananda and secondary education at Lorenz College, Skinner's Road, South Maradana and at St. Joseph's College, Colombo under Rector Fr. Le Goc.

At age fifteen, Premadasa started the Sucharita Children's Society, which later became the Sucharitha Movement, a volunteers' organisation with the objective of uplifting the economic, social and spiritual development of low-income people living in shanty areas of Colombo. He was the full-time organizer of the community development project in the area in 1939. The youth who enrolled in his development movement refrained from taking liquor and avoided smoking and gambling. Premadasa too was a teetotaler.

== Early political career ==
=== Ceylon Labour Party ===
Allying with A. E. Goonesinghe, the founder leader of the Ceylon Labour movement, Premadasa started his political career in 1946 joining the Ceylon Labour Party as a full-time member and campaigned for Goonesinghe in the 1947 general election. In 1950, he was elected to the Colombo Municipal Council as a member of San Sebastian's Ward.

=== United National Party ===
Having realised the limited future prospects in the Labour Party in the mid-1950s, Premadasa supported Sir John Kotelawala's attempts to remove the then-incumbent Mayor of Colombo, Dr N. M. Perera of the Lanka Sama Samaja Party. In 1955, Premadasa succeeded T. Rudra as Deputy Mayor and joined the United National Party in 1956 following the successful removal of Perera as mayor in February 1956.

From the UNP, Premadasa contested the 1956 general election from the Ruwanwella electorate but lost to N. M. Perera. Following his defeat, he joined J. R. Jayewardene in working for the party reorganisation under prime minister Dudley Senanayake and served as the secretary of the Religious Affairs Committee of the Buddhist Council appointed by the government to organise the 2500th Buddha Jayanthi celebrations. The following year he joined the protest march to Kandy on 3 October, which had been organized by Jayewardene. The march was disrupted at Imbulgoda by thugs led by S. D. Bandaranayake.

Premadasa was elected as the third Member of Parliament from Colombo Central in the March 1960 general election. The short-lived Dudley Senanayake government was defeated in three months and in the July 1960 general election he polled fourth in the three-member constituency of Colombo Central. In 1961, he re-entered the Colombo Municipal Council having been elected from the Cinnamon Gardens Ward and served until 1965. During this time, he worked to open preschools for poor families and initiated vocational training centres in sewing and tailoring for the youth.

=== Minister of Local Government (1965–1970) ===
Premadasa successfully contested the Colombo Central electorate in the 1965 general election and was elected to parliament and appointed as Chief Government Whip and parliamentary secretary to the Minister of Local Government M. Tiruchelvam. When Tiruchelvam resigned in 1968 after the Ilankai Tamil Arasu Kachchi left Dudley Senanayake's government, Premadasa was appointed as Minister of Local Government and became a minister in Senanayake's cabinet. During his tenure, he instituted a bridges programme using pre-stressed concrete components, created the Maligawatta Housing Scheme and became known in the local governments across the island. Premadasa turned Radio Ceylon, the oldest radio station in South Asia, into a public corporation – the Ceylon Broadcasting Corporation on 5 January 1967.

=== Opposition and the Citizens Front (1970–1977) ===
In the following 1970 general election, Premadasa was elected as the first Member of Parliament for Colombo Central and sat in the opposition with J. R. Jayewardene, the Leader of the Opposition. Premadasa was appointed Chief Opposition Whip. Furthermore, he was elected chairman of the General Assembly of the Commonwealth Inter-Parliamentary Association held in Australia.

Premadasa was a member of the Constituent Assembly which drafted the constitution of 1972. Premadasa called for reforms of the party which Dudley Senanayake refused, resulting in Premadasa resigning from the party working committee. He went on to form the Samastha Lanka Puravesi Peramuna, known generally as the Puravesi Peramuna or Citizens Front. Building up the Citizens Front, he was in open conflict with Senanayake who had recently healed a rift with Jayawardane. Amidst this conflict, Senanayake died on 13 April 1973 following a heart attack and Senanayake loyalists found fault with Premadasa. Jayawardane, who became UNP leader came to terms with Premadasa, who stopped the Citizens Front and returned to fully support the UNP, driving up its membership at grassroot levels and becoming the deputy leader of the party.

=== Minister of Local Government, Housing and Construction (1977–1978) ===
Premadasa was re-elected as the first member of parliament for Colombo Central in the 1977 general election and was appointed Leader of the House and Minister of Local Government, Housing and Construction.

== Premiership (1978–1989) ==
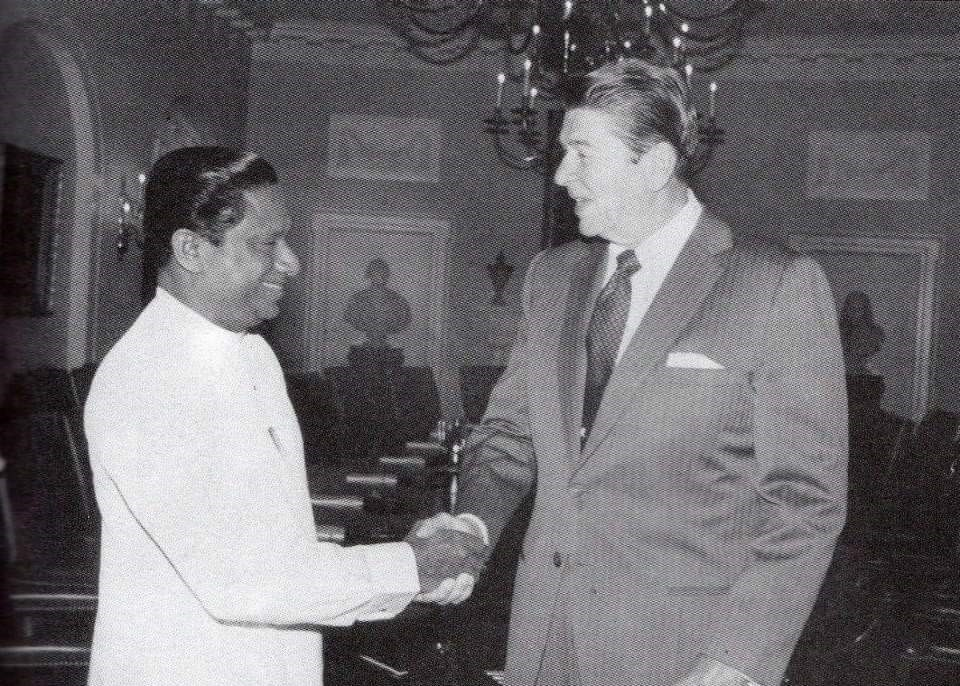
Prime Minister Premadasa meets President Ronald Reagan on a visit to the United States.

In the following year, when J. R. Jayewardene became the first executive president of Sri Lanka, he appointed Premadasa as prime minister on 6 February 1978. Premadasa began to define the new role of the prime minister under an executive president. He took residence at Temple Trees, retained the use of the Prime Minister's Lodge and established a new prime minister's office at Sirimathipaya. He began representing Sri Lanka internationally, having led the Sri Lankan delegation to the Commonwealth Heads of Government Meeting in 1979, where he secured British funding for the construction of the Victoria Dam. He headed the Sri Lankan delegation to the United Nations General Assembly in 1980 where he addressed the general assembly.

Continuing to hold the portfolios of Local Government, Housing and Construction, he initiated his political program, shelter for the poor, after the United Nations declared a Year of Shelter. His proposal to declare 1987 as the International Year of Shelter for the Homeless was unanimously accepted at the 37th session of the United Nations General Assembly. Other policies included Jana Saviya, the instrument he used to help the poor, a foster parents scheme, the Gam Udawa project with which he tried to stir up the stupor in the villages, the mobile secretariat whereby he took the central government bureaucracy to the peasants, the Tower Hall Foundation for drama and music, and the pension schemes he initiated for the elder artistes. On the economic front, the garment industry project that he initiated became a forerunner in earning foreign exchange and provision of employment in the villages. Premadasa served as prime minister from 1978 to 1988, with little rifts with president Jayewardene with the exception of the latter's signature of the Indo-Sri Lanka Accord. Jayewardene decided to step down as president after his second term and Premadasa was nominated as the party's candidate for the presidential election set for December 1988.

Premadasa was elected as the 2nd executive president of the country at the disputed 1988 presidential election, gaining 2,569,199 (50.43%) votes and defeating former prime minister Sirimavo Bandaranaike, who came in second with 2,289,860 (44.95%) votes. Premadasa became the first non-Govigama politician to be appointed prime minister and elected president of Sri Lanka.

== Presidency ==
Presidential Standard of Ranasinghe Premadasa

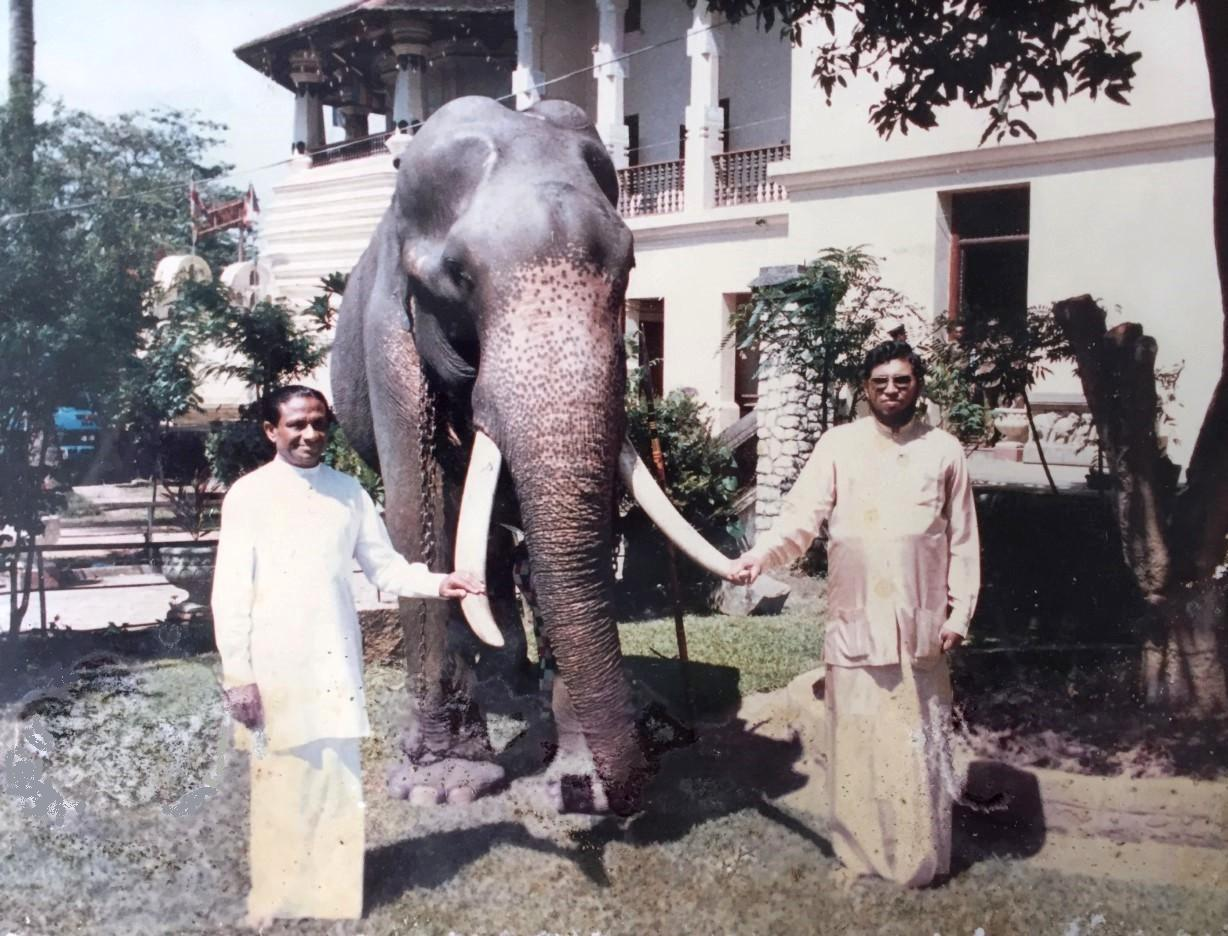
Ranasinghe Premadasa and Diyawadana Nilame Neranjan Wijeyeratne with Raja Elephant

Premadasa was inaugurated as the 3rd President of Sri Lanka at the Octagonal Pavilion of the Temple of the Tooth on 2 January 1989. His oath was administered by Chief Justice Parinda Ranasinghe.

Outgoing president Jayawardene dissolved the 11-year old parliament and called for fresh general elections on 20 December 1988, the day the results of presidential election were declared, thus Premadasa oversaw the duties of prime minister until 6 March 1989.

In the 1989 general election held on 15 February 1989, the UNP won 125 seats in parliament, forming a government with a majority in parliament. He appointed D. B. Wijetunga as the new Prime Minister on 6 March 1989. At the time he became president, the country faced both a civil war in the north and a communist insurgency in the south, both key issues Premadasa concentrated on, with particularly ruthless actions against the insurgents. Security forces brutally put down the revolt and killed many of its leaders.

=== Monetary policy ===
Premadasa concentrated on a grassroots-level economic development drive, focusing on the provision of housing, poverty alleviation and the upliftment of the poor. He encouraged the building of model villages with clean water, transport infrastructure, schools and health centres. He encouraged the establishment of small-scale industries (mostly garment-related) in poor areas by giving factory owners low-interest loans and a share in textile quotas for the United States and Europe. The Gam Udāwa programme is one of his best-known achievements in this area, along with the Janasaviya programme that is today part of the Samurdhi scheme.

=== JVP insurrection ===
Appointing Ranjan Wijeratne as Minister of Foreign Affairs and State Minister for Defence, Premadasa had Wijeratne clamp down on the JVP insurgent activity in the south which had been paralyzing the state machinery and economic activity of the island since 1987 with its target killings, its unofficial curfews and work stoppages. Operation Combine launched by Wijeratne successfully challenged the insurgency by brutally suppressing and killing its leaders, including JVP leader Rohana Wijeweera by late 1989 and effectively ending the insurrection by early 1990.

=== Civil war ===
Premadasa's handling of the country's civil war was less successful. In the north, the Liberation Tigers of Tamil Eelam faced off against the Indian Peace Keeping Force. The Indian presence on the island was unpopular, and Premadasa requested India to pull out its troops. In order to force the IPKF to leave the island, Premadasa authorized a clandestine operation to supply arms to LTTE to fight the IPKF-backed Eelam People's Revolutionary Liberation Front, a collusion that came to light in the report published by the Sri Lankan Presidential Commission to inquire into the 1992 assassination of Lieutenant General Denzil Kobbekaduwa. While the IPKF was recalled by New Delhi in 1990, the government's war with the LTTE resumed, beginning Eelam War II, which ended in a stalemate five years later. The 1990 massacre of Sri Lankan Police officers, which occurred after the policemen were asked to surrender to the LTTE in Batticaloa at Premadasa's request, was later established to have been performed with the same weapons he had supplied them.

=== Impeachment attempt ===
In September 1991, Premadasa faced an impeachment attempt in parliament led by his two formidable rivals in the UNP, Lalith Athulathmudali and Gamini Dissanayake. He defeated the attempt by adjourning Parliament and Speaker M. H. Mohamed dismissed the impeachment stating a lack of signatures after several parliamentarians who supported the impeachment later withdrew their support after facing threats. Premadasa expelled Athulathmudali and Dissanayake from the party, who then went on to form their own political party, the Democratic United National Front (DUNF).

=== Country name change ===
In 1992, Premadasa changed the country's English name from Sri Lanka to Shri Lanka on the advice of soothsayers, who predicted it would improve the country's fortunes. The change was reverted after his assassination in 1993.

== Assassination ==
Ranasinghe Premadasa was killed along with 23 others on 1 May 1993, around 12.45 p.m. during the UNP's May Day rally in Colombo by an LTTE suicide bomber. The explosion took place at Armour Street-Grandpass Junction in Hulftsdorp, Colombo while President Premadasa was unofficially supervising the procession as it was heading towards the Galle Face Green from Sugathadasa Stadium. The suicide bomber was later identified as Kulaveerasingam Veerakumar alias 'Babu', a close friend of the president's valet E. M. P. Mohideen. He rode a bicycle towards the president, left it near the president's Range Rover and walked towards the president when security personnel attempted to stop him. Despite this, Mohideen allowed him to get close to the President, when Veerakumar detonated the explosive device. Killed in the explosion were Mohideen, SSP Ronnie Gunasinghe and most of Premadasa's personal staff. Another 38 people were injured in the bombing including seven who were seriously wounded. Confusion prevailed as it was unclear what had happened, with Premadasa and his security detail missing. His death was only confirmed two hours later by his personal physician when the remains of the president were identified by his ring and watch.

The site of the explosion was cleaned within hours before a proper investigation was conducted. The May Day parade continued even after the explosion for some time. An island-wide curfew was imposed hours after the assassination. Prime minister Dingiri Banda Wijetunga was sworn in as the acting president in the afternoon. The government did not announce the death of President Premadasa until 6 p.m. local time when state television Rupavahini broadcast a tape of BBC's report of the incident. A period of national mourning was announced until the funeral. Police claimed that they recovered the severed head of a young man suspected to be the bomber, which was found to have a cyanide suicide capsule, bearing LTTE tradecraft in his mouth. Premadasa's state funeral took place at Independence Square, Colombo on 9 May 1993.

== Legacy ==
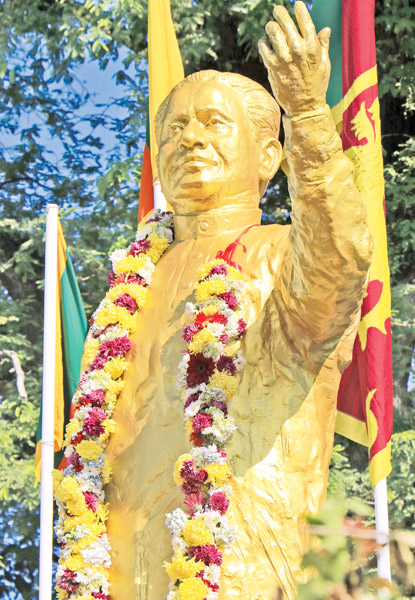
The Sri Lankabhimanya Ranasinghe Premadasa Memorial in Colombo, Sri Lanka

Amongst Sri Lankans, Premadasa has left behind a mixed legacy. While he was seen as a spokesperson of the poor, common man, his handling of the country's two civil conflicts, the JVP insurrection and the Sri Lankan civil war, have been heavily criticised.

R. Premadasa Stadium, which was built under Premadasa's supervision in 1986, still remains named after him.

The Sri Lankabhimanya Ranasinghe Premadasa Memorial is a statue depicting Premadasa, which stands in Hulftsdorp, Colombo.

The Former President Sri Lankabhimanya Ranasinghe Premadasa Memorial Monument stands at the location of the bomb blast, at the junction of Armour Street and Grandpass Road in Hulftsdorp.

Ranasinghe Premadasa's son, Sajith Premadasa, went on to become a politician in his own right. Sajith ran for presidency twice unsuccessfully in 2019 and 2024, winning 41.99% and 32.76% of the vote respectively. He is the current Leader of the Opposition and leader of the Samagi Jana Balawegaya, a breakaway party of the United National Party his father once led.

=== In popular culture ===
- The 1993 Indian Tamil-language film Gentleman was rewritten by the director S. Shankar based on the assassination of Ranasinghe Premadasa after a request by film producer K. T. Kunjumon. The film was in the post-production stage when Premadasa was assassinated, and the film was released on 30 July 1993.

== Personal life ==
Premadasa married Hema Wickramatunge, the only daughter of Mr and Mrs Wickramatunge Arachchige Charles Appuhamy of Bandarawela on 23 June 1964. They had a son, Sajith, and a daughter, Dulanjali. A hard worker, Premadasa was known for rising early and following a strict routine. He lived and worked from his private residence and office, Sucharitha even during his tenure as prime minister and president.

== See also ==
- Sajith Premadasa
- List of political families in Sri Lanka
- List of assassinations of the Sri Lankan Civil War
- List of assassinated and executed heads of state and government

Government offices
Preceded by Junius Richard Jayawardene	President of Sri Lanka; 1989–1993	Succeeded by Dingiri Banda Wijetunga
Preceded by Junius Richard Jayawardene	Prime Minister of Sri Lanka; 1978–1989	Succeeded by Dingiri Banda Wijetunga
Diplomatic posts
Preceded by Maumoon Abdul Gayoom	Chairperson of SAARC; 1991	Succeeded by Khaleda Zia
