= M. S. Themis =

Ceylonese politician and trade unionist

Manuel Savariyappa Themis (1932 – May 2016) was a Ceylonese politician and trade unionist.

== Early life and education ==
Manuel Savariappage Themis was born in Thulhiriya in 1932, the son of an electrician. He grew up in Colombo, where his family had moved for numerous economic reasons. He attended the Dedigamuwa Junior School and then Gauthama Sastralaya, Wellampitiya.

== Early trade union career ==
He was employed as a telegram messenger in the Ceylon Postal Department, where he joined the trade union movement. In 1950, at the age of 18, Themis was elected the Vice President of the All Ceylon Post and Telecommunications Union and the following year was elected as its Secretary.

== Political career ==
At the 3rd parliamentary election held in April 1956 was elected as the third member from Colombo Central, a multi-member constituency, beating Dr. M. C. M. Kaleel of the United National Party by 46 votes into fourth place. On 7 July 1959 he resigned from the Sri Lanka Freedom Party and left the government, along with Philip Gunawardena to form Mahajana Eksath Peramuna (People's United Front). At the 4th parliamentary election held in March 1960, the Mahajana Eksath Peramuna only obtained ten parliamentary seats, with Themis failing to retain his seat in the March 1960 general election and unsuccessfully contesting the July 1960 general election. In 1965 Mahajana Eksath Peramuna joined with the United National Party to form a government under Prime Minister Dudley Senanayake. At that point Themis left politics and commenced a career in printing and publishing. Themis established his own stationery company, Royal Mailhouse Pvt. Ltd.

In 1993 Themis returned his parliamentary pension, in response to several of his peers requesting the Speaker of Parliament, Mohamed Haniffa Mohamed, make gratuity payments to them.
