= Bala Tampoe =

Bala Tampoe (23 May 1922 – 1 September 2014) was a Sri Lankan lawyer and a trade unionist. He was the General Secretary of the Ceylon Mercantile, Industrial and General Workers Union (CMU) in Sri Lanka.

== Early life and education ==
Born on 23 May 1922 to a prominent family in Jaffna, he was educated at the Royal College, Colombo and gained a BSc degree from the newly established University of Ceylon in 1943 and the University of London in 1944. Later he studied law at the Colombo Law College and became an advocate, practicing criminal law.

== Trade union activities ==
He became a lecturer in Botany and Horticulture in the Department of Agriculture. He came into the limelight after his dismissal from public service, for participating in the strike of public servants in 1947. Soon after he joined the CMU.

The CMU was originally built in 1928 as a white-collar union in the mercantile sector. After Tampoe became its general secretary in February 1948, the union came under the influence of the Lanka Sama Samaja Party (LSSP), which at the time was part of the Fourth International. In the 1950s and 1960s, Tampoe was known for his militant challenges to the political decisions of the government of the day. In 1963, he led a strike in the Colombo port that escalated into an all-island general strike and defied the government of Sirima Bandaranaike when it invoked its emergency powers.

When the LSSP left the Fourth International to join the Bandaranaike government in 1964, Tampoe became a central leader of the Lanka Sama Samaja Party (Revolutionary), which the United Secretariat of the Fourth International recognised as its section. Tampoe unsuccessfully contested the March 1960 general election, July 1960 general election and the 1965 general election from the Colombo Central electorate.

After Tampoe died, Sylvester Jayakody became the current General Secretary of the CMU.
