= Wapchie Marikar Abdul Rahman =

Ceylonese businessman and politician

Wapchie Marikar Abdul Rahman (1868–1933) was a Ceylonese landed proprietor and politician. He was the Unofficial member for the Moor community in the Legislative Council of Ceylon from 1900 to 1915.

Born in Colombo on 26 March 1868, he was educated at the Government School, Gasworks Street and at Wesley College, Colombo. He joined his father's construction business in 1888 and left in 1898 to managed his landholdings. In 1900, he was nominated as the Moor representative to the Legislative Council of Ceylon and served until 1915. He died on 6 April 1933 and was buried at Kuppiyawatte Muslim Burial Grounds, Maradana.

He married Hajara Umma Marikar-Haji daughter of Isubu Lebbe Marikar, they had three children; son Sir Razik Fareed and two daughters Ummu Razeena Abdul Rahman who married Ghouse Mohideen and Ummu Rakeeba Abdul Rahman who married Muhammad Fuard.
