= Leftist parties in Sri Lanka =

During the Donoughmore period of political experimentation (1931–48), several Sri Lanka leftist parties were formed in British colonial Ceylon. Unlike most other Sri Lankan parties, these leftist parties were noncommunal in membership.

== History ==
Working-class activism, especially trade unionism, became an important political factor during the sustained economic slump between the world wars.

The leftist parties represented the numerically small urban working class and the larger rural working class concentrated in the plantations and mines. Partly because these parties operated through the medium of trade unionism, they lacked the wider mass appeal needed at the national level to provide an effective extra-parliamentary challenge to the central government. Nonetheless, because the leftists occasionally formed temporary political coalitions before national elections, they posed more than just a mere "parliamentary nuisance factor." In 1953 it was the left who summoned the 'Hartal' of 1953 which led to the resignation of the Prime minister, Dudley Senanayake.

The first important leftist party was the Ceylon Labour Party, founded in 1931 by A.E. Goonesinha, but this had drifted into communalist strike-breaking action by 1937.

=== Marxist oriented parties ===
Three Marxist oriented parties—the Ceylon Equal Society Party (Lanka Sama Samaja Party—LSSP), the Bolshevik-Leninist Party, and the Communist Party of Sri Lanka (CPSL)--represented the Left proper.

They grew out of the Youth League movement, the struggle to get funds for Sri Lankan ex-servicemen, volunteer work during the Malaria Epidemic and the anti-colonial struggle of the 1930s, which culminated in the call for full independence (eschewed by D.S. Senanayake and others of the elite). All three were divided on both ideological and personal grounds. The Soviet Union's expulsion of Leon Trotsky from the Communist Party after Lenin's death in 1924 exacerbated these differences, dividing the Communists into Trotskyists and Stalinists.

==== Lanka Sama Samaja Party—LSSP ====
The Lanka Sama Samaja Party−LSSP, formed in 1935 and the oldest of the Sri Lankan Marxist parties, indeed of all existing Sri Lankan parties, took a stance independent of the Soviet Union, becoming affiliated with the Trotskyist Fourth International, which was a rival of the Comintern. Its two representatives in the State Council, Philip Gunawardena and Dr N.M. Perera, were a thorn in the side of the British colonial administration.

Most LSSP leaders were arrested during World War II for their opposition to what they considered to be an "imperialist war." However, they managed to escape and the LSSP's underground work continued throughout the war. The party's propaganda was a vital element in the mutiny of the Ceylon Garrison Artillery on the Cocos Islands in 1942. It was the main opposition party after the general elections of 1936, 1947 and 1956, the second largest party in Parliament after the general elections of 1947, 1956 and 1970.

Although in more recent years, the LSSP has been considered a politically spent force, gaining, for example less than 1% of the vote in the 1982 presidential elections, it has nevertheless been touted as the world's only successful Trotskyist party. This was because it participated in Government and because it has played a role far larger than its electoral success would suggest, having been ideologically hegemonic in the period 1936-1977. The 1972 Republican Constitution was drafted by Dr Colvin R. de Silva, an LSSP Minister and the country's leading lawyer.

==== Bolshevik-Leninist Party ====
The Bolshevik-Leninist Party was formed in 1945 as a breakaway group of the LSSP, which reunited with its parent in 1950.

==== Communist Party of Sri Lanka−CPSL ====
The Communist Party of Sri Lanka−CPSL, which began as a Stalinist faction of the LSSP that was later expelled, formed its own party in 1943, remaining faithful to the dictates of the Communist Party of the Soviet Union.

==== The Socialist Party of Sri Lanka ====
The Socialist Party of Sri Lanka is the first left-wing party in Sri Lanka to nominate a female presidential candidate. Dr. Ajantha Perera, an environmental scientist, who has over 30 years of experience advising multiple Ministries in Sri Lanka and Fiji, contested in the Presidential elections of December 2019. Dr. Ajantha Perera is also the first female Presidential candidate of Sri Lanka this millennium (since 1999).

== See also ==
- Political history of Sri Lanka
- Socialist parties in Sri Lanka
- Trotskyist organisations in Sri Lanka
