= Second Dudley Senanayake cabinet =

- 6th Cabinet of Ceylon

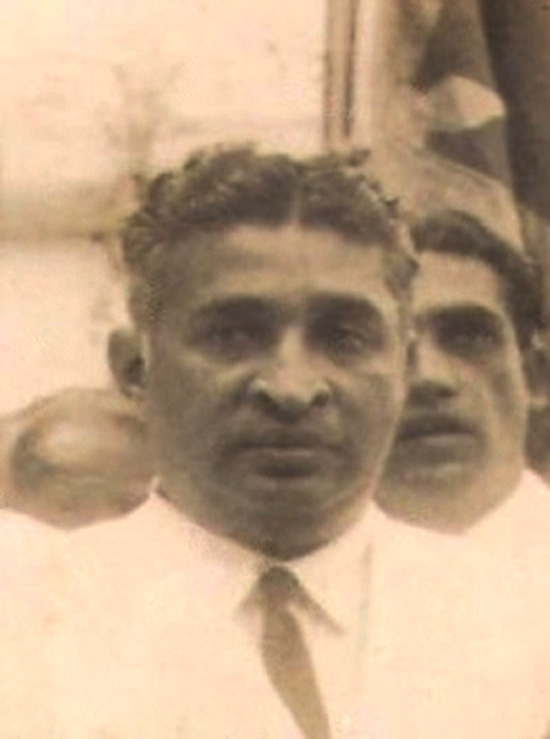
- Date formed: 21 March 1960
- Date dissolved: 21 July 1960

People and organisations
- Monarch: Elizabeth II
- Prime Minister: Dudley Senanayake
- Member party: United National Party
- Status in legislature: Minority government
- Opposition party: Sri Lanka Freedom Party
- Opposition leader: C. P. de Silva

History
- Election: March 1960
- Outgoing election: July 1960
- Legislature term: 4th
- Predecessor: Dahanayake
- Successor: Sirimavo Bandaranaike I

The Second Dudley Senanayake cabinet was the central government of Ceylon led by Prime Minister Dudley Senanayake in 1960. It was formed in March 1960 after the parliamentary election and it ended in July 1960 after the opposition's victory in the parliamentary election.

== Cabinet members ==
Name	Portrait	Party	Office	Took office	Left office	Refs
Dudley Senanayake		United National Party	Prime Minister	21 March 1960	21 July 1960	
Dudley Senanayake		United National Party	Minister of Defence and External Affairs	23 March 1960	21 July 1960	
Bernard Aluwihare		United National Party	Minister of Education and Cultural Affairs	23 March 1960	1960	
M. D. Banda		United National Party	Minister of Agriculture and Lands	23 March 1960	1960	
M. D. Banda		United National Party	Minister of Food, Commerce and Trade	23 March 1960	1960	
Senator E. J. Cooray			Minister of Justice	23 March 1960	1960	
J. R. Jayewardene		United National Party	Minister of Finance	23 March 1960	1960	
J. R. Jayewardene		United National Party	Minister of Local Government and Housing	23 March 1960	1960	
Montague Jayawickrama		United National Party	Minister of Nationalised Services, Shipping and Transport	23 March 1960	1960	
Montague Jayawickrama		United National Party	Minister of Posts, Works and Power	23 March 1960	1960	
M. C. M. Kaleel		United National Party	Minister of Home Affairs and Rural Development	23 March 1960	1960	
Senator M. V. P. Peiris		United National Party	Minister of Health and Social Services	23 March 1960	1960	
