= Gaffoor Building =

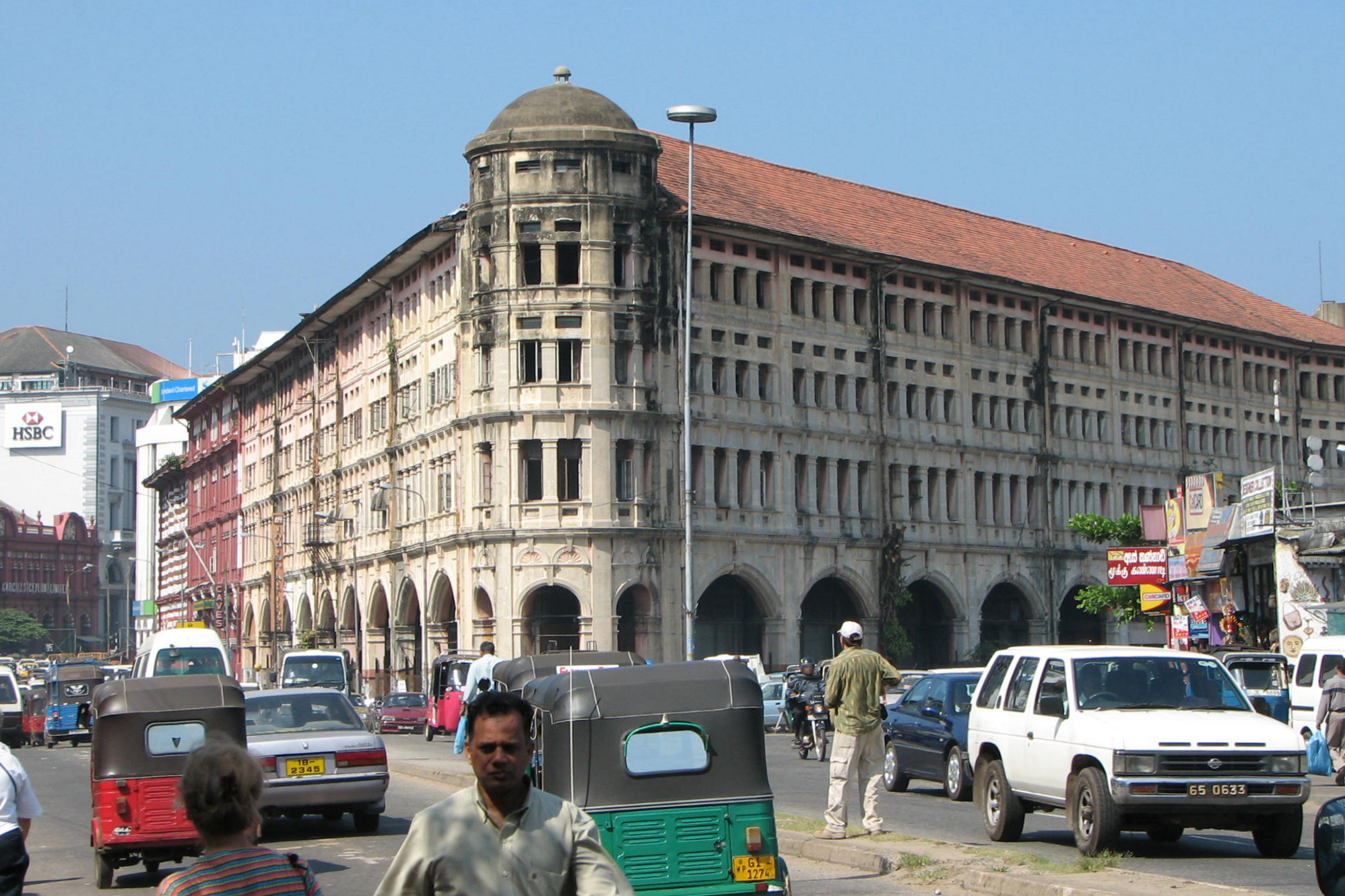

- Location within Central Colombo

General information
- Location: corner Sir Baron Jayatilaka Mawatha and Leyden Bastian Street, Colombo Fort, Colombo, Sri Lanka
- Coordinates: 6°56′12″N 79°50′47″E
- Opened: 1915
- Client: N. D. H. Abdul Gaffoor

Technical details
- Floor count: four (including a basement)
- Floor area: 8,250sqm
- Grounds: 2,960sqm

The Gaffoor Building is a prominent four-storey wedge-shaped building located on the corner Sir Baron Jayatilaka Mawatha and Leyden Bastian Street, Colombo Fort.

The building was built for Noordeen Hajiar Abdul Gaffoor, one of the country's pioneer jewellers and gem stone traders. Gaffoor established N. D. H. Abdul Gaffoor & Sons (Export of Gems, Pearls, & Jewelry, Import of Diamonds) at the Bristol Hotel in Colombo in 1894. He was one of a few merchants who received exclusive permission to board ships in the Colombo harbour to sell gems and jewellery. In 1901 Gaffoor was granted the privilege of exhibiting pearls, diamonds, rubies and sapphires and art works to the Prince and Princess of Wales during their Royal visit. He took part in a number of world exhibitions including, the St. Louis World's Fair in 1904, All Ceylon Exhibition in 1912, the British Empire Exhibition in 1924 and the Philadelphia World Fair in 1925, all of which further enhanced his and his company's reputation. His younger brother, N. H. M. Abdul Cader, was one of the Muslim representatives on the Legislative Council, serving between 1917 and 1930.

== History ==
The Gaffoor Building was completed in 1915 and was described as being "one of the largest and finest commercial structures in Colombo". The building not only provided space for Gaffoor's jewellery emporium, but also provided office space on the upper floors for many of Ceylon's most prominent companies and trading houses; well-known tenants included H. W. Cave & Co. (the country's premier bookshop), Mackwoods Ltd, Holland-Ceylon Commercial Co. and the Rubber and Produce Traders (Ceylon) Ltd.

In October 1947 the office of Australian High Commissioner to Sri Lanka (which at the time was the Dominion of Ceylon) was relocated from the Galle Face Hotel to the Gaffoor Building. In 1950 it was relocated to the Grand Oriental Hotel.

The Gaffoor Building was gazetted as a 'Protected Monument' under the Antiquities Ordinance on 4 October 2000, due to its historical value. In 2008 the Commissioner at the Department of Archeology, Dr. Senarath Dissanayake noted that the "building is in very bad condition and the money spent on its conservation is expected to be in the range of several millions of rupees." "It is in a dilapidated condition and on the verge of collapsing. The worst thing is the water that seeps underneath making the foundation weak." The building was subject to unauthorised works, with a portion of the building being converted into a car park despite it being declared as a heritage building.

In 2012 a consortium of international investors proposed to redevelop the building into a 4-storey 300 room boutique hotel, at an investment of over US$ 90 million, inclusive of the value of the land. The major impediment to the redevelopment was the lack of clarity as to who the legal owners of the building were. The title to the building was with the EAP Group and the Edirisinghe family however there were a number of other claimants, including the descendants of the Gaffoor family, who lodged injunctions against building's sale. In addition the building was occupied by squatters and the investors were concerned that they might demand adverse possession of the building. Both issues had the potential to significantly delay the acquisition and redevelopment of the site.

It was subsequently purchased by the Sri Lanka Ports Authority (SLPA) and the ownership was transferred to the Urban Development Authority (UDA). In 2014 the UDA chairman, Nimal Perera, announced that the authority would be reconstructing and renovating the building, in order to redevelop it as a 63-room hotel, with the ground floor accommodating up to six supermarkets. The hotel would be operated by the City Hotels Group and the works would be undertaken by the Sri Lanka Navy under the instructions of the UDA.
