= Razik Fareed =

Ceylonese (Sri Lankan) landed proprietor, politician and philanthropist

Hon. Sir Razik Fareed OBE, JP, UM

Member of the Ceylon Parliament for Colombo Central
- In office 20 July 1960 – 22 March 1965
- In office 30 May 1952 – 19 March 1960

Personal details
- Born: 29 December 1893 Colombo
- Died: 23 August 1984 (aged 90) Colombo
- Party: United National Party
- Other political affiliations: Sri Lanka Freedom Party
- Spouse: Ameena Umma Binthi Ibrahim
- Education: Zahira College Colombo, Royal College, Colombo
- Occupation: Politician, Diplomat
- Profession: Landed proprietor

Military service
- Allegiance: British Ceylon
- Branch/service: Ceylon Defence Force
- Years of service: 1915–1918
- Rank: Lieutenant
- Unit: Colombo Town Guard
- Battles/wars: World War I

Sir Razik Fareed, OBE, JP, UM (29 December 1893 – 23 August 1984), also known as A. R. A. Razik, was a Ceylonese (Sri Lankan) landed proprietor, politician and philanthropist. He was a former Cabinet Minister of Trade, Senator, member of parliament and the state council. He also served as Ceylon's High Commissioner to Pakistan.

== Early life and education ==
Born Abdul Rahman Abdul Razik at the Layards Broadway, Colombo to Wapchi Marikar Abdul Rahuman and Hajara Umma, his mother died when he was three years old. His grandfather was Arasi Marikar Wappichi Marikar, a leading building contractor. His father Wapchie Marikar Abdul Rahman was appointed as the Moore member of the Legislative Council of Ceylon in 1900 and served till 1915. Razik was educated at Bernadet School, Bambalapitiya; Madrasathul Zahira, Maradana and at the Royal College, Colombo. Following his schooling he became a landed proprietor. In 1915, he joined the Moorish Section of the Colombo Town Guard as a corporal and was promoted to the rank of lieutenant in 1916, having served during the 1915 Riots.

== Political career ==
Entering politics in 1930, A. R. A. Razik was elected to the Colombo Municipal Council as a Municipal Councillor from the New Bazaar Ward. He was appointed to the State Council of Ceylon on 12 March 1936 representing the Moors (Muslims). In the State Council, he served in the Local Administration Committee, chaired by S.W.R.D. Bandaranaike from 1936 to 1942 and in 1942 he was appointed to the Education Committee, chaired by C.W.W. Kannangara.

In 1947, with Ceylon gaining self rule, A. R. A. Razik became a founding member of the United National Party. He was denied nominations from the Colombo Central electorate by the United National Party and instead contested from the Pottuvil electorate for the House of Representatives of Ceylon which replaced the State Council in the 1947 general election, where he lost to Mudaliar M. M. Ebrahim. He was then elected to the Senate of Ceylon by the House of Representatives by the United National Party. Resigning from the Senate in 1952, he contested the 1952 general elections and was elected to the House of Representatives from the Colombo Central electorate and was re-elected in the 1956 general elections. He served as Cabinet Minister of Trade in the caretaker government of Prime Minister W. Dahanayake in 1959. He lost his seat in the March 1960 general elections, but regained it in the July 1960 general elections having contested form the Sri Lanka Freedom Party. He was one of thirteen SLFP parliamentarians who crossed over to the opposition with C. P. de Silva on 3 December 1964 resulting in the defeat of the SLFP government under Prime Minister Sirima Bandaranaike. In 1965, he was appointed to the House of Representatives to represent the Moor community as one of six members appointed by the Governor General. From May 1967 to September 1967 he served as Deputy Chairman of Committees and from September 1967 to February 1968, he was the Deputy Speaker and Chairman of Committees of the Parliament. Retiring from parliament in 1968, he was appointed Ceylon's High Commissioner to Pakistan and Ambassador Extraordinary and Plenipotentiary to Iraq and Iran. He served till 1970.

== Philanthropy ==
Razik is remembered for his work with T. B. Jayah to increase the education standards among the Muslim community. He established the Muslim Ladies College on his own land. He initiated the teacher training colleges in Aluthgama and Addalachchenai to train Tamil language teachers. He founded the All Ceylon Moors Association and the Moors Islamic Cultural Home and served as its president.

== Honors ==
He was appointed a Justice of Peace and Unofficial Magistrate in 1932. He was made an Officer of the Order of the British Empire in the 1948 New Year Honours and was knighted in the 1951 Birthday Honours. Bristol Street in Colombo was renamed as Sir Razik Fareed Mawatha and the Sir Razik Fareed Muslim Maha Vidiyalaya in Benthara has been named after him. Sri Lanka commomrated him with a postage stamp on 22 May 1988.

== See also ==
- Sri Lankan Non Career Diplomats
