= Colombo =

Most populous city of Sri Lanka

Colombo කොළඹ (Sinhala) கொழும்பு (Tamil)
- Executive and judicial capital
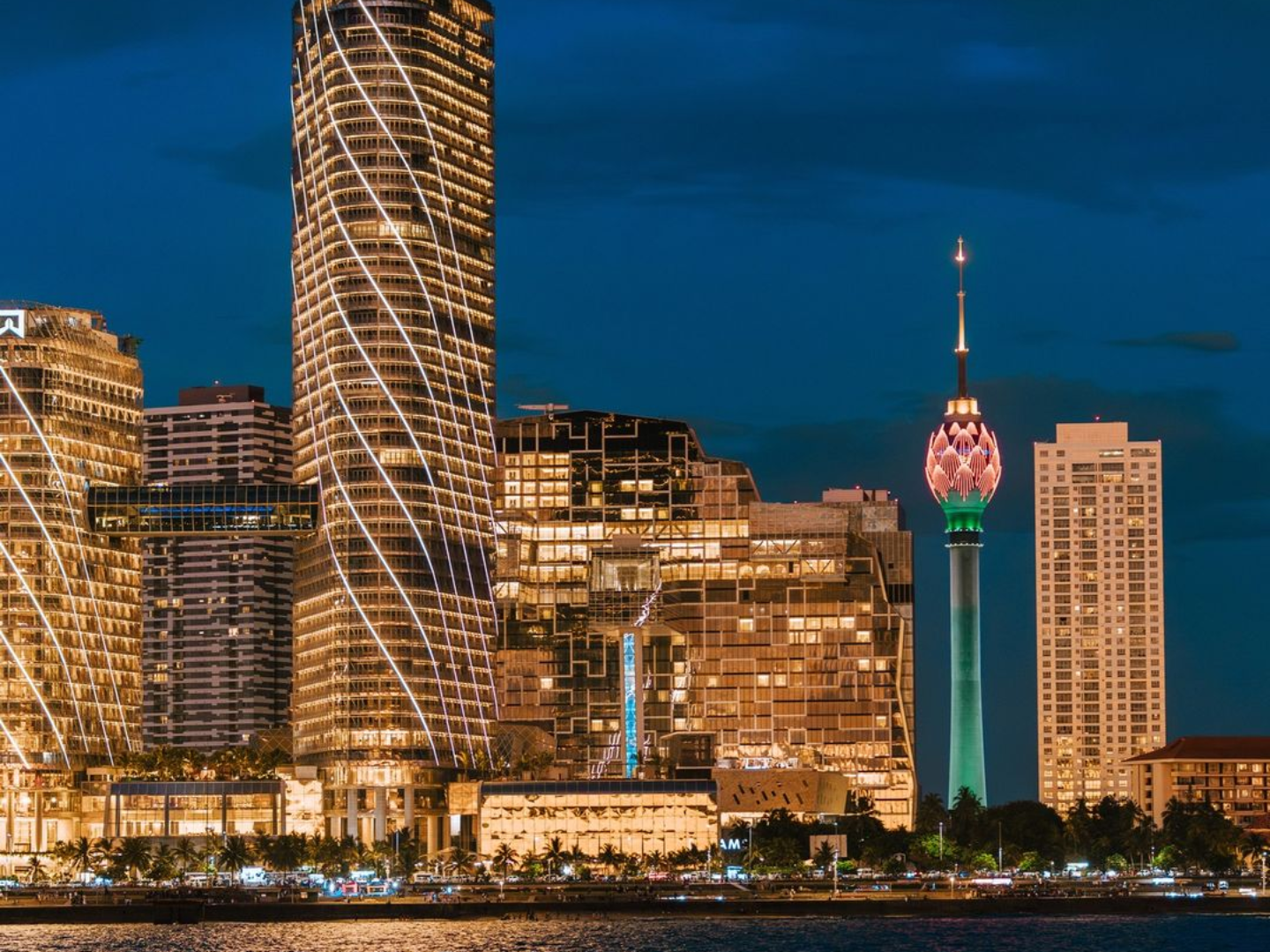
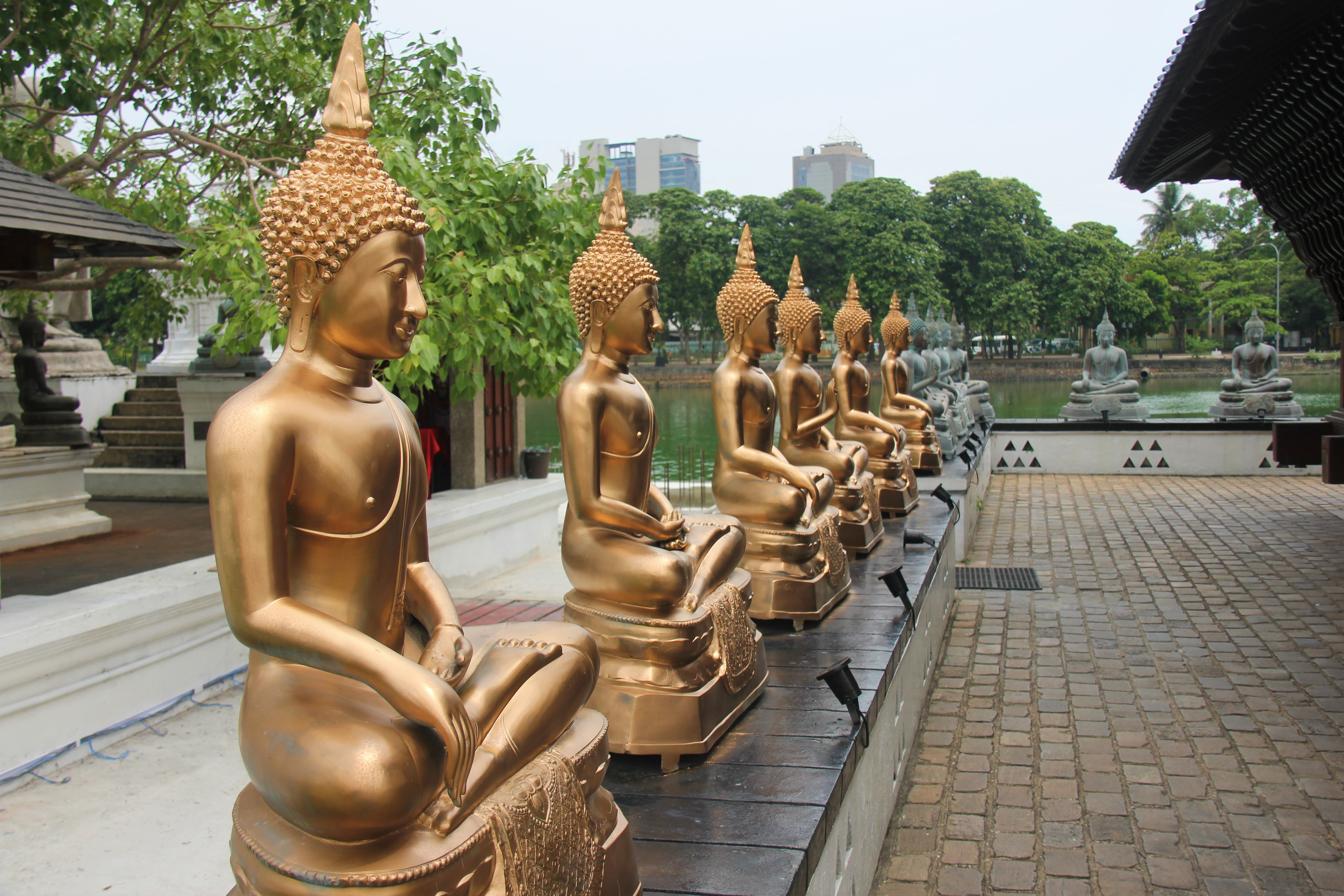
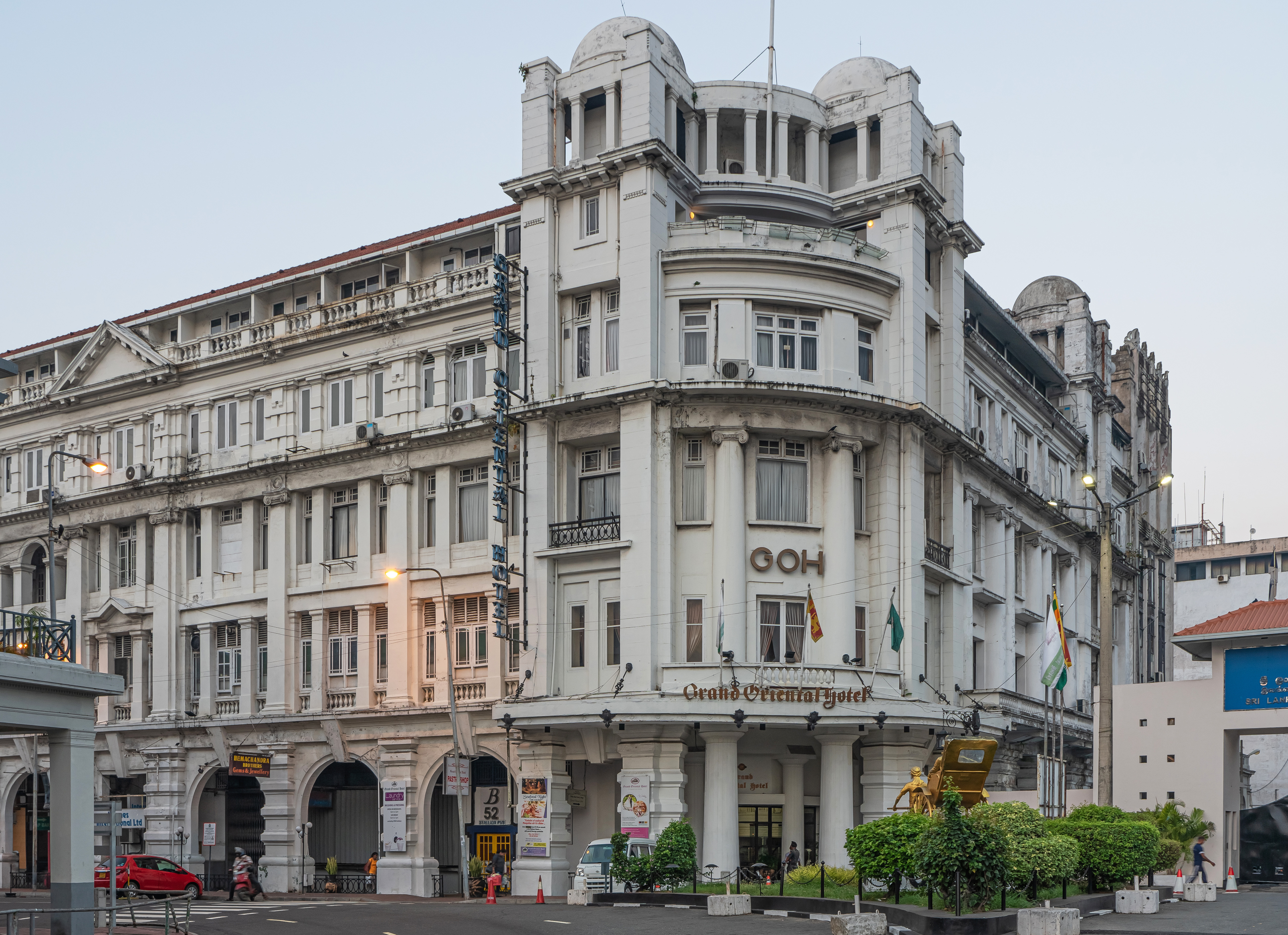
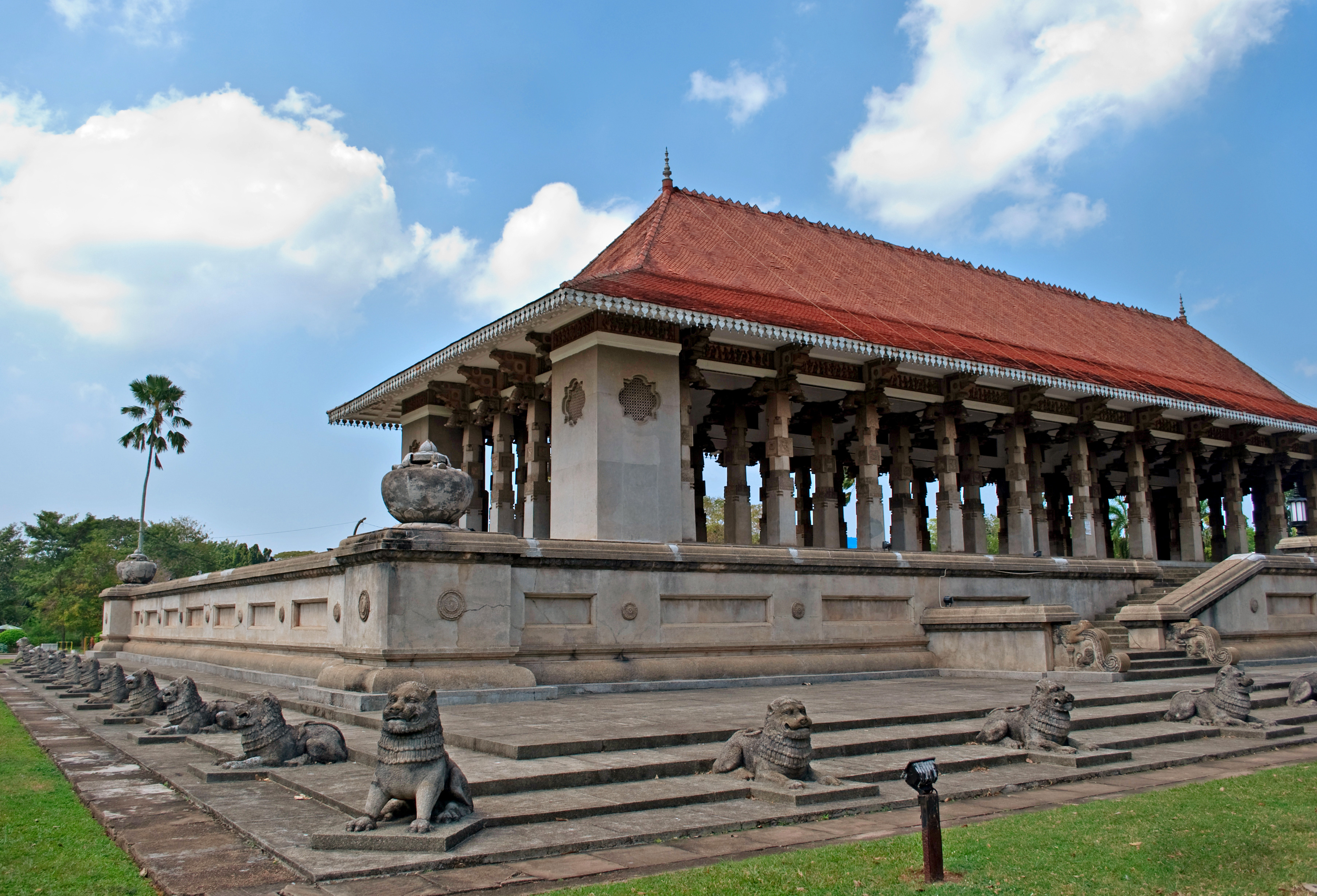
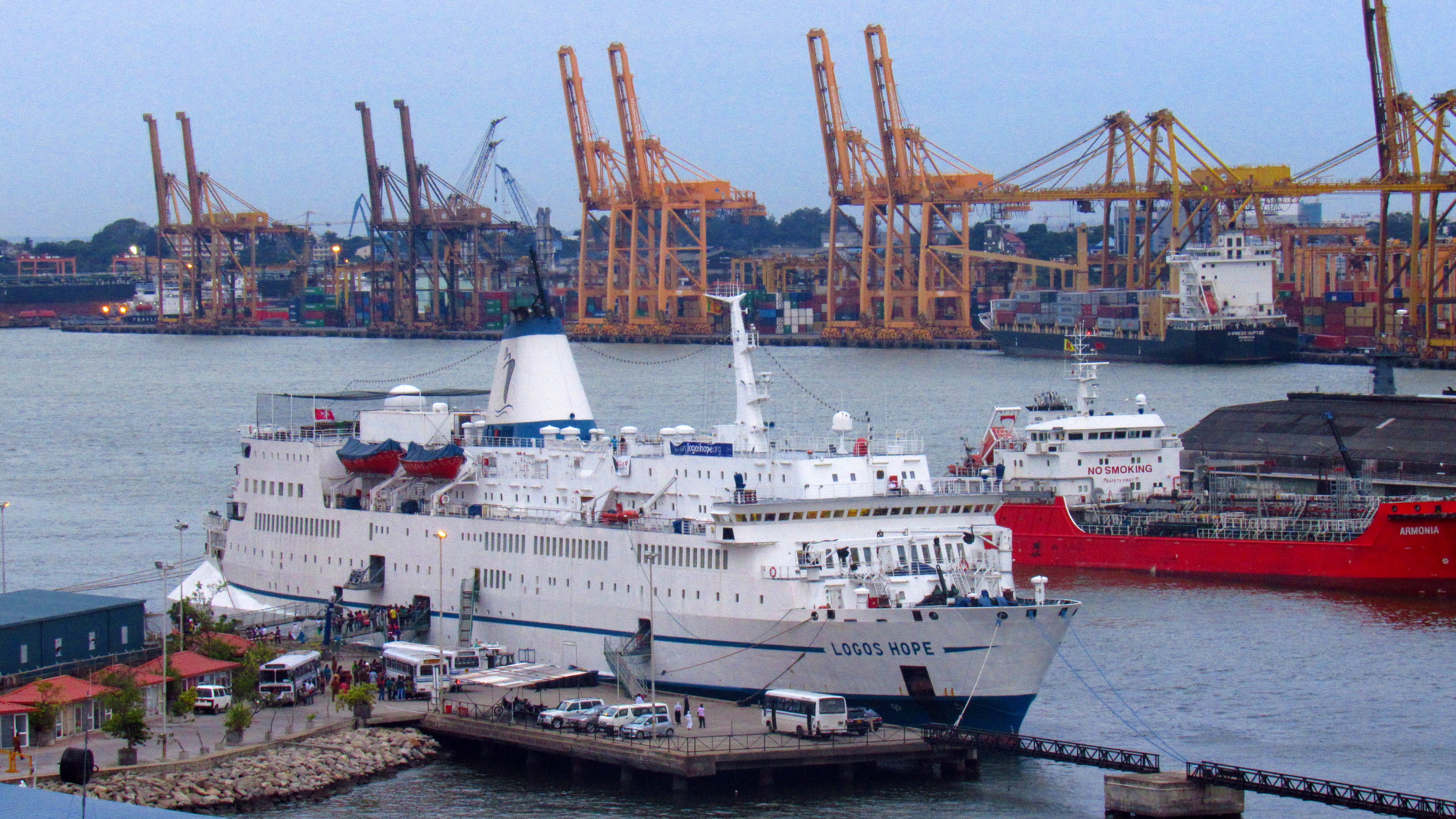
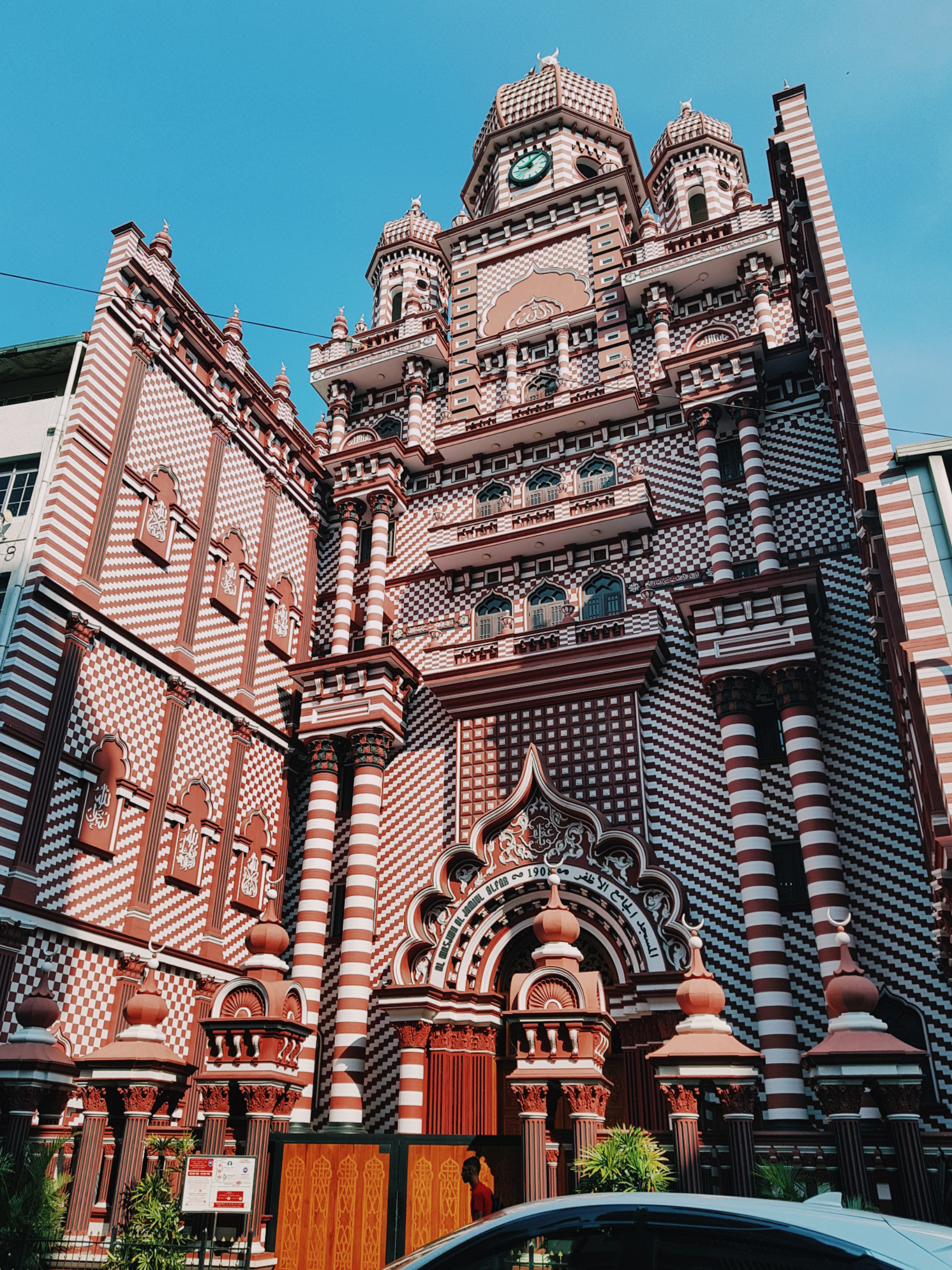
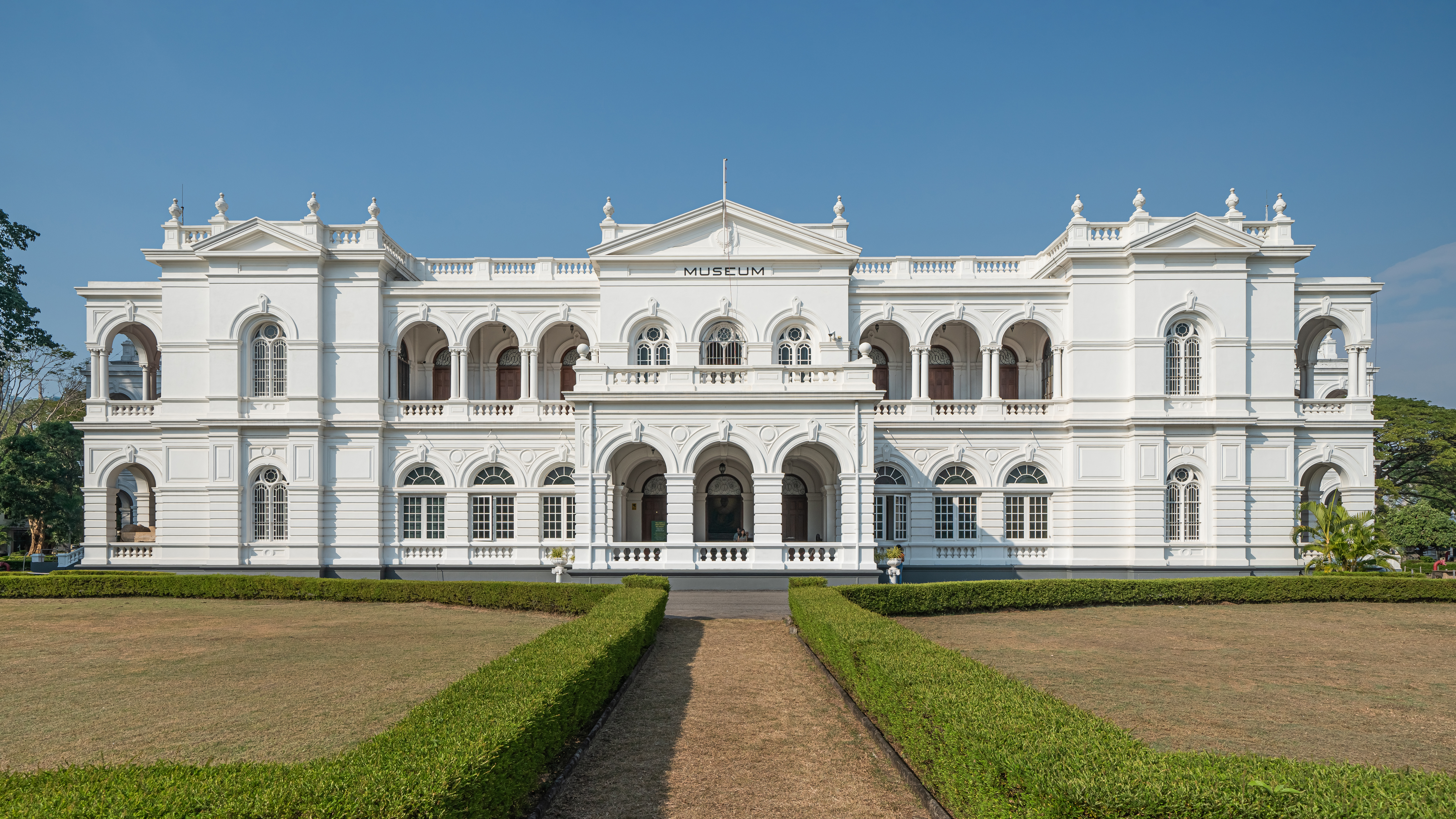
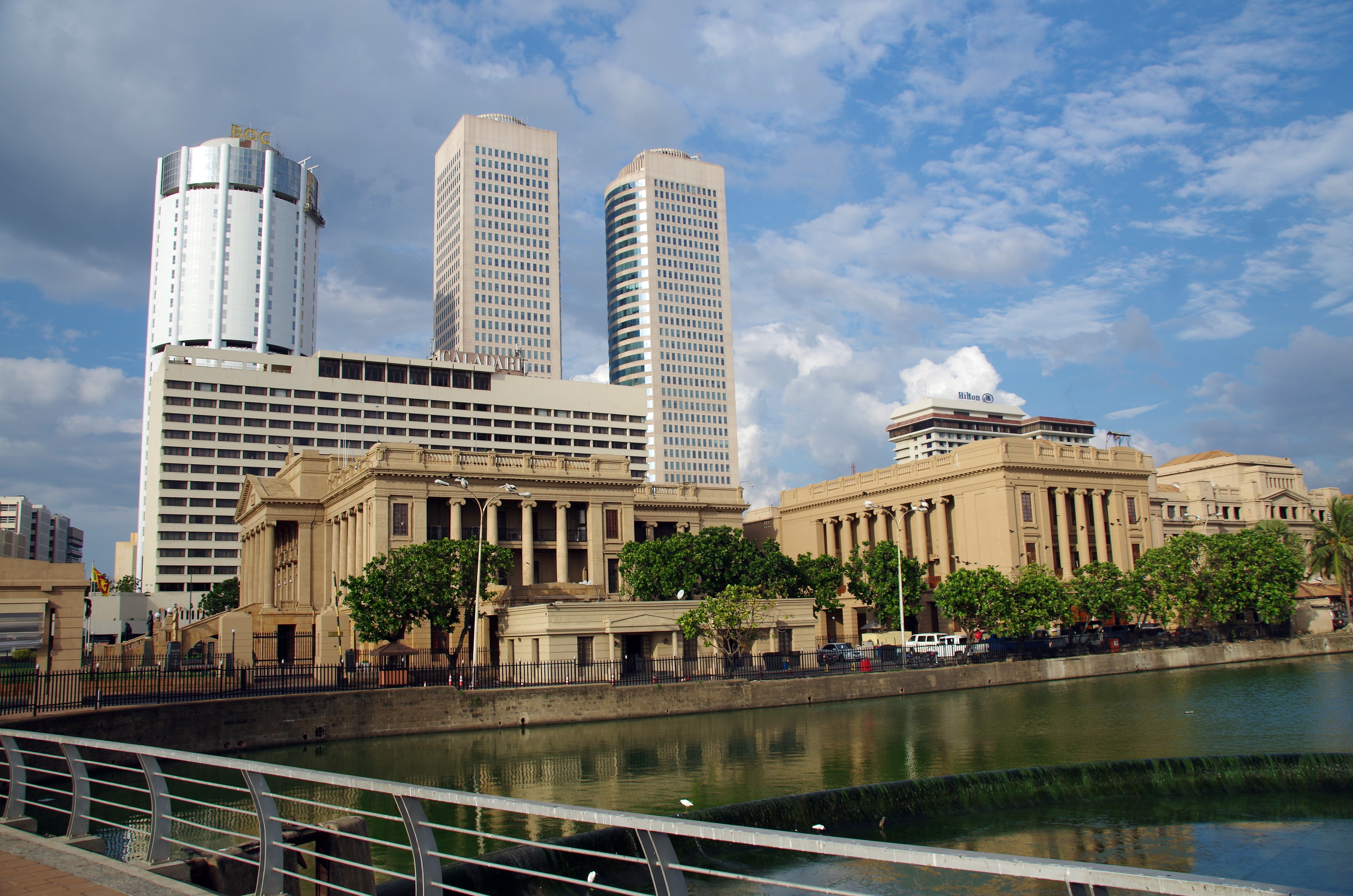
- Skyline of Colombo seen at night featuring ITC Ratnadipa, Shangri-La Colombo, City of Dreams and Lotus Tower Buddha statues at Seema Malaka The Grand Oriental Hotel in Fort Independence Memorial Hall Nelum Pokuna Theatre Port of Colombo Jami Ul-Alfar Mosque Colombo National Museum Skyline of Fort featuring Old Parliament Building, Bank of Ceylon and WTC twin towers

- Flag Seal

- Location within Colombo District Location within Sri Lanka Location within Asia
- Coordinates: 6°56′04″N 79°50′34″E
- Country: Sri Lanka
- Province: Western Province
- District: Colombo District

Government
  - Municipal Council: Colombo Municipal Council
  - Headquarters: Town Hall
  - Mayor: Vraîe Cally Balthazaar (NPP)

Area
  - Executive and judicial capital: 37.31 km^{2} (14.41 sq mi)
  - Land: 1,000 km^{2} (390 sq mi)
  - Metro: 3,684 km^{2} (1,422 sq mi)
- Elevation: 1 m (3.3 ft)

Population (2011)
  - Executive and judicial capital: 752,993
  - Density: 20,182/km^{2} (52,270/sq mi)
  - Urban: 2,323,826
  - Metro: 5,648,000
- Time zone: UTC+05:30 (SLST)
- Postal code: 0xxxx
- Area code: 011
- Website: colombo.mc.gov.lk

Colombo (/kəˈlʌmboʊ/ kə-LUM-boh; Sinhala: කොළඹ, romanised: Koḷam̆ba, IPA: [ˈkoləᵐbə]; Tamil: கொழும்பு, romanised: Koḻumpu, IPA: [koɻumbɯ]) is Sri Lanka's executive and judicial capital, as well as the country's most populous city. It is also the financial centre of the island and a tourist destination. The Colombo metropolitan area is estimated to have a population of 5.6 million, and 752,993 within the municipal limits. It is located on the west coast of the island. It is also the administrative capital of the Western Province and the district capital of Colombo District.

It was made the capital of the island when Sri Lanka was ceded to the British Empire in 1815, retaining its capital status when Sri Lanka gained independence in 1948. In 1978, when administrative functions were moved to Sri Jayawardenepura Kotte, Colombo was designated as the commercial capital of Sri Lanka.

== Etymology ==
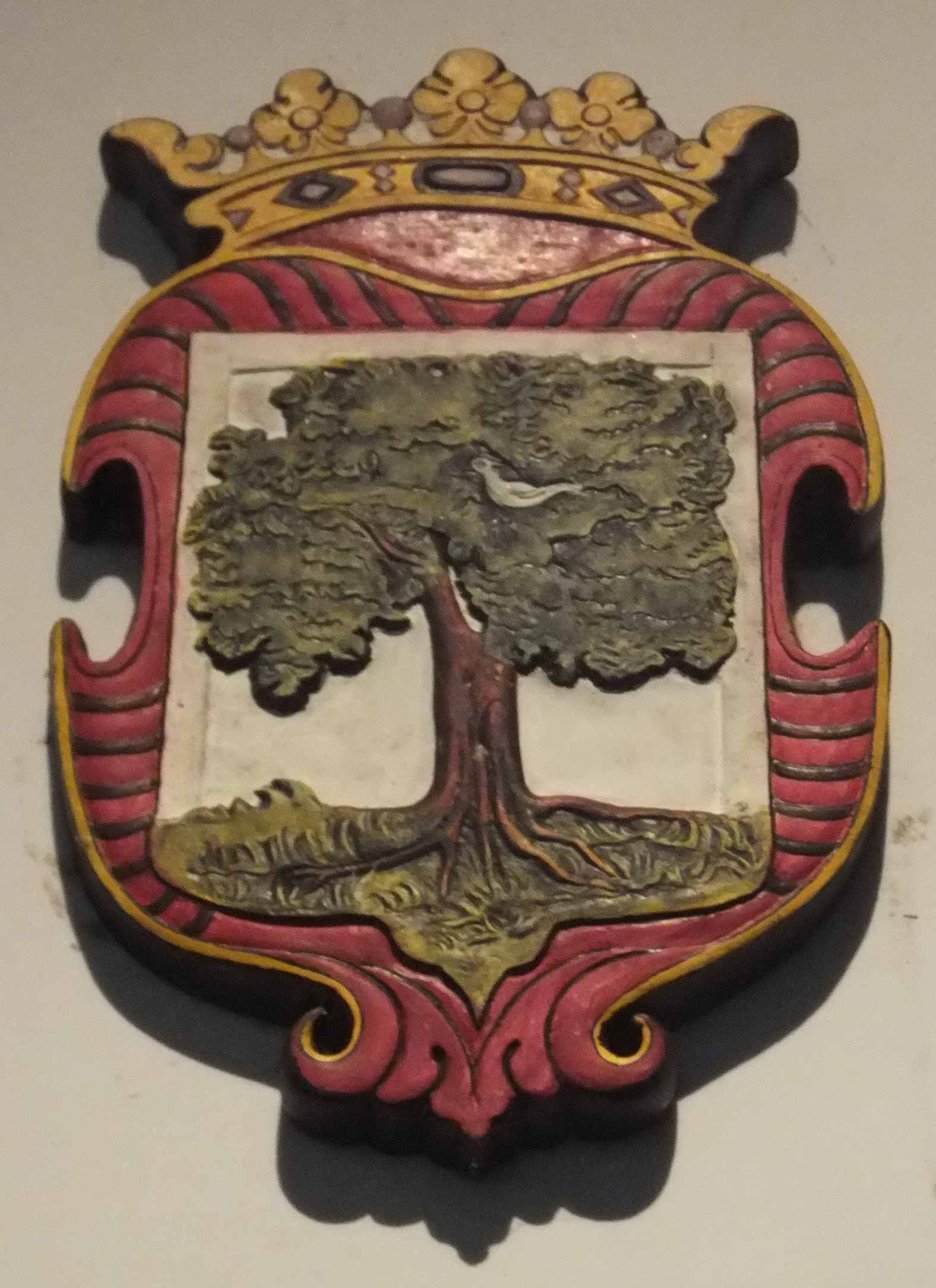
Coat of arms of Colombo from the Dutch Ceylon era, depicting a mango tree

The name 'Colombo', first introduced by the Portuguese explorers in 1505, is believed to be derived from the classical Sinhala name කොලොන් තොට, கொல்லம் துறைமுகம் Kolon thota, meaning "port on the river Kelani".

Another belief is that the name is derived from the Sinhala name කොල-අඹ-තොට, பெருங்குடல் துறைமுகம் Kola-amba-thota which means 'Harbour with leafy/green mango trees'.

The author of the oldest Sinhala grammar, Sidatsangarava, written in the 13th century wrote about a category of words that exclusively belonged to early Sinhala. It lists naramba (to see) and kolamba (fort or harbour) as deriving from the indigenous Vedda language. Kolamba may also be the source of the name of the commercial capital Colombo.

== History ==
Traveller Ibn Battuta, who visited the island in the 14th century, referred to it as Kalanpu. Arabs, whose primary interests were trade, began to settle in Colombo around the eighth century AD mostly because the port helped their business by the way of controlling much of the trade between the Sinhalese kingdoms and the outside world. It was popularly believed that their descendants comprised the local Sri Lankan Moor community, but their genetics are predominantly South Indian.

=== Portuguese era ===
Portuguese explorers led by Dom Lourenço de Almeida first arrived in Sri Lanka in 1505. During their initial visit they made a treaty with the King of Kotte, Parakramabahu VIII (1484–1518), which enabled them to trade in the island's crop of cinnamon, which lay along with the coastal areas of the island, including in Colombo. As part of the treaty, the Portuguese were given full authority over the coastline in exchange for the promise of guarding the coast against invaders. They were allowed to establish a trading post in Colombo. Within a short time, however, they expelled the Muslim inhabitants of Colombo and began to build a fort in 1517.

The Portuguese soon realised that control of Sri Lanka was necessary for the protection of their coastal establishments in India, and they began to manipulate the rulers of the Kotte kingdom to gain control of the area. After skilfully exploiting rivalries within the royal family, they took control of a large area of the kingdom and the Sinhalese King Mayadunne established a new kingdom at Sitawaka, a domain in the Kotte kingdom. Before long he annexed much of the Kotte kingdom and forced the Portuguese to retreat to Colombo, which was repeatedly besieged by Mayadunne and the later kings of Sitawaka, forcing them to seek reinforcement from their major base in Goa, India. Following the fall of the kingdom in 1593, the Portuguese were able to establish complete control over the coastal area, with Colombo as their capital. This part of Colombo is still known as Fort and houses the presidential palace and the majority of Colombo's five star hotels. The area immediately outside Fort is known as Pettah (Sinhala: පිට කොටුව,Tamil: புறக் கோட்டை piṭa koṭuva, "outer fort") and is a commercial hub.

=== Dutch era ===
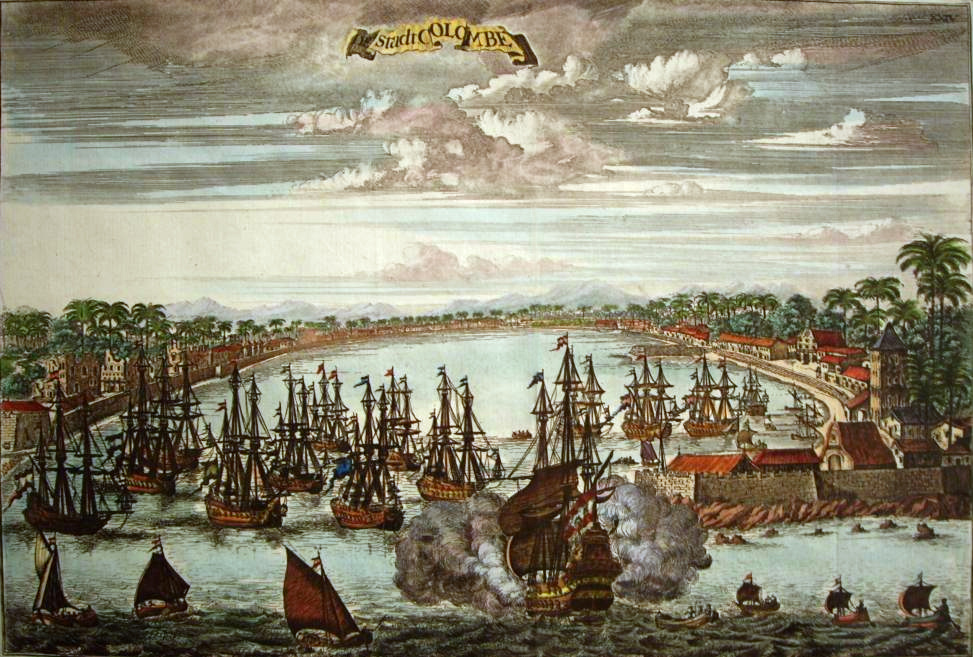
Dutch engraving of Colombo in about 1680

In 1638 the Dutch signed a treaty with King Rajasinha II of Kandy which assured the king assistance in his war against the Portuguese in exchange for a monopoly of the island's major trade goods. The Portuguese resisted the Dutch and the Kandyans but were gradually defeated in their strongholds beginning in 1639. The Dutch captured Colombo in 1656 after an epic siege, at the end of which a mere 93 Portuguese survivors were given safe conduct out of the fort. Although the Dutch (e.g., Rijcklof van Goens) initially restored the captured area back to the Sinhalese kings, they later refused to turn them over and gained control over the island's richest cinnamon lands including Colombo which then served as the capital of the Dutch maritime provinces under the control of the Dutch East India Company until 1796.

=== British era ===
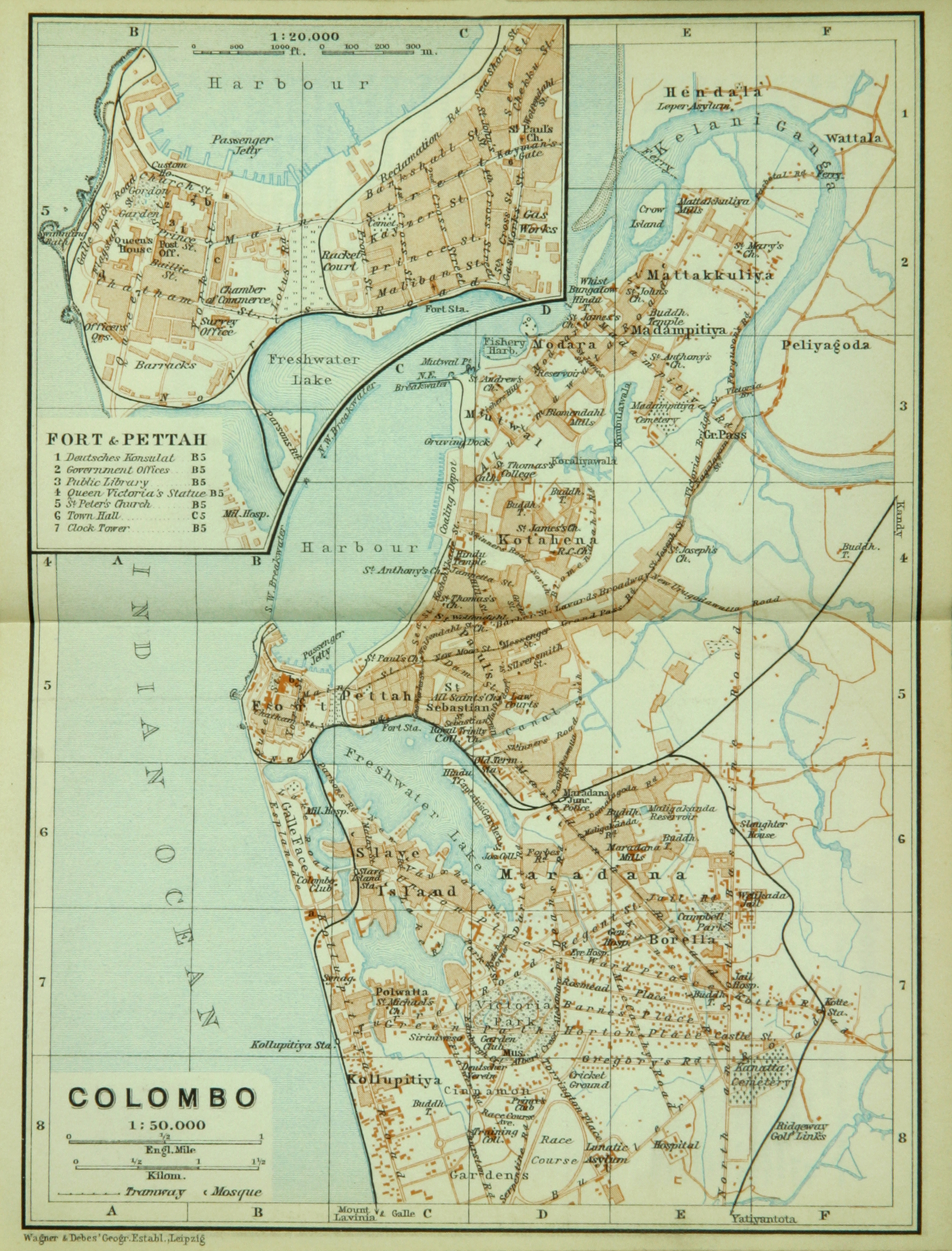
Map of Colombo, c. 1914

Although the British captured Colombo in 1796, it remained a British military outpost until the Kandyan Kingdom was ceded to them in 1815 and they made Colombo the capital of their newly created crown colony of British Ceylon. Unlike the Portuguese and Dutch before them, whose primary use of Colombo was as a military fort, the British began constructing houses and other civilian structures around the fort, giving rise to the current City of Colombo.

Initially, they placed the administration of the city under a "Collector", and John Macdowell of the Madras Service was the first to hold the office. Then, in 1833, the Government Agent of the Western Province was charged with the administration of the city. Centuries of colonial rule had meant a decline of indigenous administration of Colombo and in 1865 the British conceived a Municipal Council as a means of training the local population in self-governance. The Legislative Council of Ceylon constituted the Colombo Municipal Council in 1865 and the Council met for the first time on 16 January 1866. At the time, the population of the region was around 80,000.

During the time they were in control of Colombo, the British were responsible for much of the planning of the present city. In some parts of the city, tram car tracks and granite flooring laid during the era are still visible today.

=== After independence ===
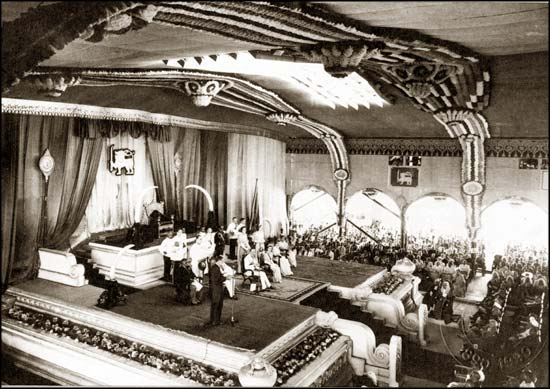
The formal ceremony marking the start of self-rule at Independence Square.

This era of colonialism ended peacefully in 1948 when Ceylon gained independence from Britain. Due to the tremendous impact this caused on the city's inhabitants and on the country as a whole, the changes that resulted at the end of the colonial period were drastic. An entire new culture took root. Changes in laws and customs, clothing styles, religions and proper names were a significant result of the colonial era. These cultural changes were followed by the strengthening of the island's economy. Even today, the influence of the Portuguese, the Dutch and the British is visible in Colombo's architecture, names, clothing, food, language and attitudes. Buildings from all three eras stand as reminders of the turbulent past of Colombo. The city and its people show an interesting mix of European clothing and lifestyles together with local customs.

Historically, Colombo referred to the area around the Fort and Pettah Market which is known for the variety of products available as well as the Khan Clock Tower, a local landmark. At present, it refers to the city limits of the Colombo Municipal Council. More often, the name is used for the Conurbation known as Greater Colombo, which encompasses several Municipal councils including Kotte, Dehiwela and Colombo.

Although Colombo lost its status as the capital of Sri Lanka in the 1980s to Sri Jayawardanapura, it continues to be the island's commercial centre. Despite the official capital of Sri Lanka moving to the adjacent Sri Jayawardanapura Kotte, most countries still maintain their diplomatic missions in Colombo.

== Geography ==
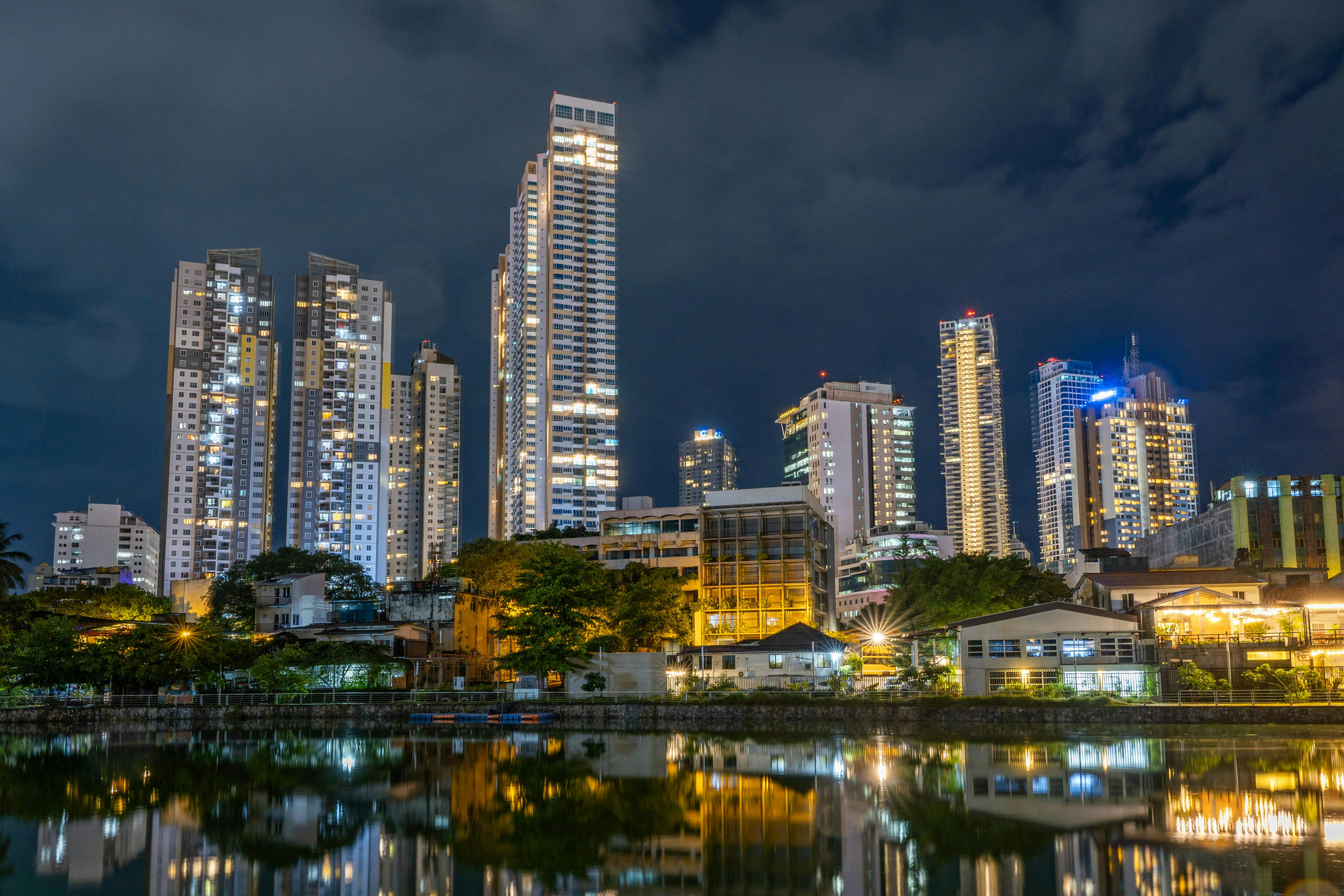
Trizen (apartment complex) overlooking Beira Lake at night.

The geography of Colombo consists of both land and water. The city has many canals and, in the heart of the city, the 65-hectare (160-acre) Beira Lake. The lake is one of the most distinctive landmarks of Colombo and was used for centuries by colonists to defend the city. It remains a tourist attraction, hosting regattas, and theatrical events on its shores. The northern and north-eastern border of the city of Colombo is formed by the Kelani River, which meets the sea in a part of the city known as the Modera (mōdara in Sinhala) which means river delta.

=== Climate ===
Colombo features a tropical rainforest climate (Af). Colombo's climate is hot throughout the year. From March to April the average high temperature is around 31 °C (87.8 °F). The only major change in the Colombo weather occurs during the monsoon seasons from April to June and September to November, when heavy rains occur. Colombo sees little relative diurnal range of temperature, although this is more marked in the drier winter months, where minimum temperatures average 22 °C (71.6 °F). Rainfall in the city averages around 2,500 millimetres (98 in) a year.

Climate data for Colombo, Sri Lanka (1991–2020 normals, extremes 1961–2020)
Month	Jan	Feb	Mar	Apr	May	Jun	Jul	Aug	Sep	Oct	Nov	Dec	Year
Record high °C (°F)	35.2 (95.4)	36.4 (97.5)	36.1 (97.0)	35.2 (95.4)	34.5 (94.1)	35.2 (95.4)	32.6 (90.7)	32.7 (90.9)	32.5 (90.5)	33.6 (92.5)	34.2 (93.6)	35.0 (95.0)	36.4 (97.5)
Mean daily maximum °C (°F)	31.4 (88.5)	31.6 (88.9)	32.0 (89.6)	32.0 (89.6)	31.5 (88.7)	30.7 (87.3)	30.3 (86.5)	30.3 (86.5)	30.4 (86.7)	30.4 (86.7)	30.6 (87.1)	30.9 (87.6)	31.0 (87.8)
Daily mean °C (°F)	27.2 (81.0)	27.6 (81.7)	28.4 (83.1)	28.7 (83.7)	28.9 (84.0)	28.4 (83.1)	28.1 (82.6)	28.1 (82.6)	27.9 (82.2)	27.5 (81.5)	27.3 (81.1)	27.2 (81.0)	27.9 (82.2)
Mean daily minimum °C (°F)	23.1 (73.6)	23.6 (74.5)	24.8 (76.6)	25.3 (77.5)	26.2 (79.2)	26.1 (79.0)	25.9 (78.6)	25.9 (78.6)	25.4 (77.7)	24.7 (76.5)	23.9 (75.0)	23.5 (74.3)	24.9 (76.8)
Record low °C (°F)	16.4 (61.5)	18.8 (65.8)	17.7 (63.9)	21.2 (70.2)	20.5 (68.9)	21.4 (70.5)	21.4 (70.5)	21.6 (70.9)	21.2 (70.2)	21.0 (69.8)	18.6 (65.5)	18.1 (64.6)	16.4 (61.5)
Average precipitation mm (inches)	79.6 (3.13)	77.4 (3.05)	102.7 (4.04)	248.9 (9.80)	313.6 (12.35)	196.7 (7.74)	122.6 (4.83)	115.5 (4.55)	264.2 (10.40)	359.3 (14.15)	345.8 (13.61)	170.7 (6.72)	2,397 (94.37)
Average precipitation days (≥ 1.0 mm)	4.9	5.1	7.7	12.6	16.6	15.2	10.0	10.2	15.2	18.6	16.0	9.0	141.2
Average relative humidity (%) (at Daytime)	69	69	71	75	78	79	78	77	78	78	76	73	75
Mean monthly sunshine hours	248.0	246.4	275.9	234.0	201.5	195.0	201.5	201.5	189.0	201.5	210.0	217.0	2,621.3
Source 1: NOAA (humidity, sun 1961–1990)
Source 2: Deutscher Wetterdienst (extremes)

== Attractions ==
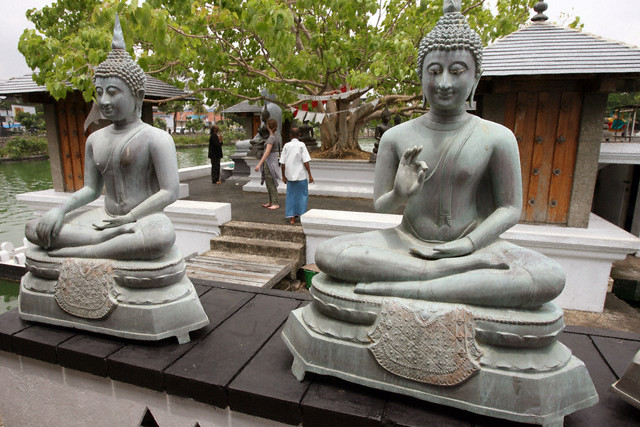
The Seema Malakaya of the Gangarama Temple in the Beira Lake in the Company Roads area is one of many religious structures in Colombo

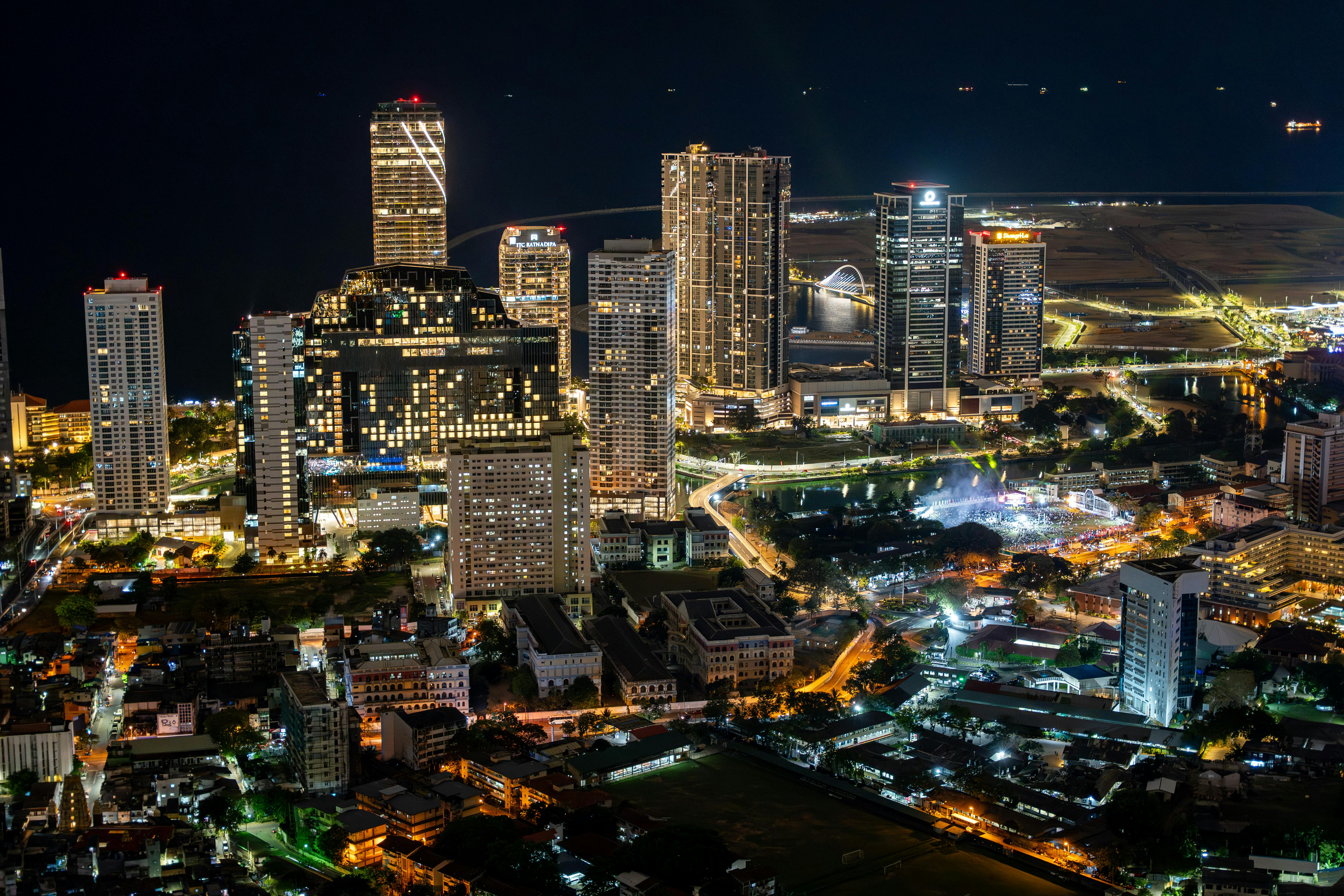
A picture of Colombo's skyline from the Lotus tower, showing the ITC Ratnadipa, One Galle Face, The Shangri-La apartments and Port City Colombo in the background.

Galle Face Green is located in the heart of the city along the Indian Ocean coast and is a destination for tourists and residents alike. The Galle Face Hotel is a historic landmark on the southern edge of this promenade.

Gangaramaya Temple is one of the most important temples in Colombo. The temple's architecture demonstrates an eclectic mix of Sri Lankan, Thai, Indian and Chinese architecture.

The Viharamahadevi Park (formerly Victoria Park) is an urban park located next to the National Museum of Colombo and the Town Hall. It is the oldest and largest park in Colombo and features a large Buddha statue.

As part of the Urban Regeneration Program of the Government of Sri Lanka, many old sites and buildings were revamped into modern public recreational spaces and shopping precincts. These include Independence Memorial Hall Square, Pettah Floating Market and Old Dutch Hospital, among others.

== Demographics ==
Ethnicity in Colombo Municipality area (2025)
1. Sinhalese 36.9 (35.9%)
2. Sri Lankan Tamils 29.6 (28.8%)
3. Sri Lankan Moors 29 (28.2%)
4. Sri Lankan Chinese 2.2 (2.14%)
5. Indian Tamils 2 (1.95%)
6. Other 3 (2.92%)

Colombo is a multi-religious, multi-ethnic and multi-cultural city. The population of Colombo is a mix of numerous ethnic groups, mainly Sinhalese, Sri Lankan Moor and Sri Lankan Tamils, . There are also small communities of people with Chinese, Portuguese Burgher, Dutch Burgher, Malay and Indian origins living in the city, as well as numerous European expatriates. Colombo is the most populous city in Sri Lanka, with 642,163 people living within the city limits. In 1866 the city had a population of around 80,000.

Religion in Colombo Municipality area (2012)
1. Buddhism (31.4%)
2. Islam (31.2%)
3. Hinduism (22.6%)
4. Christianity (14.5%)
5. Other (0.10%)

== Government and politics ==
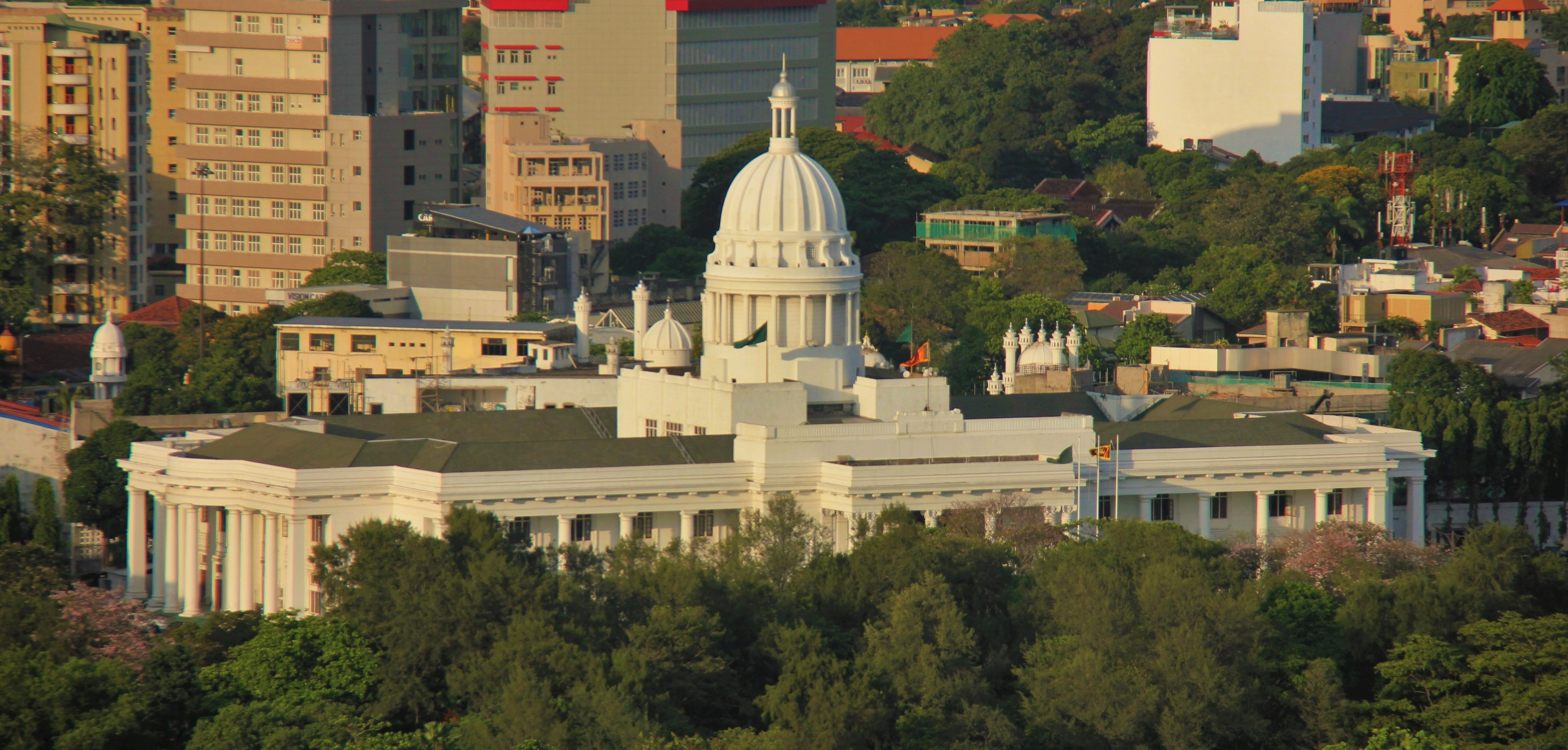
Colombo Municipal Council

=== Local government ===
Colombo is a charter city, with a mayor-council government. The mayor and council members are elected through local government elections held every five years. The city had historically been ruled by the United National Party (UNP), a right leaning party, whose business-friendly policies resonate with the population of Colombo. However in 2025, the National People's Power won the local elections and Vraîe Cally Balthazaar became mayor. She is the second woman to hold the position, after her predecessor Rosy Senanayake (2018–2023), and leads Colombo under the NPP-JVP alliance, marking the city's first left-wing governance since N.M. Perera (1954–1956).

The city government provides sewer, road and waste management services to the residents. In the case of water, electricity and telephone utility services, the council liaises with the National Water Supply and Drainage Board (NWSDB), the Ceylon Electricity Board (CEB) and telephone service providers operating in the country respectively.

=== National capital status ===
Colombo was the capital of the coastal areas controlled by the Portuguese, the Dutch and the British from the 1700s to 1815 when the British gained control of the entire island following the Kandyan convention. From then until the 1980s the national capital of the island was Colombo.

During the 1980s plans were made to move the administrative capital to Sri Jayawardenepura Kotte and thus move all governmental institutions out of Colombo to make way for commercial activities. As a primary step, the Parliament was moved to a new complex in Kotte, with several ministries and departments also relocated. However, the move was never completed.

Today, many governmental institutions still remain in Colombo. These include the President's House, Presidential Secretariat, Prime Minister's House (Temple Trees), Prime Minister's Office, the Supreme Court of Sri Lanka, Central Bank of Sri Lanka, important government ministries and departments; such as Finance (Treasury), Defence, Public Administration & Home affairs, Foreign affairs, Justice and the Military headquarters, Naval headquarters (SLNS Parakrama), Air Force headquarters (SLAF Colombo) and Police national and field force headquarters.

== Suburbs and postal codes ==
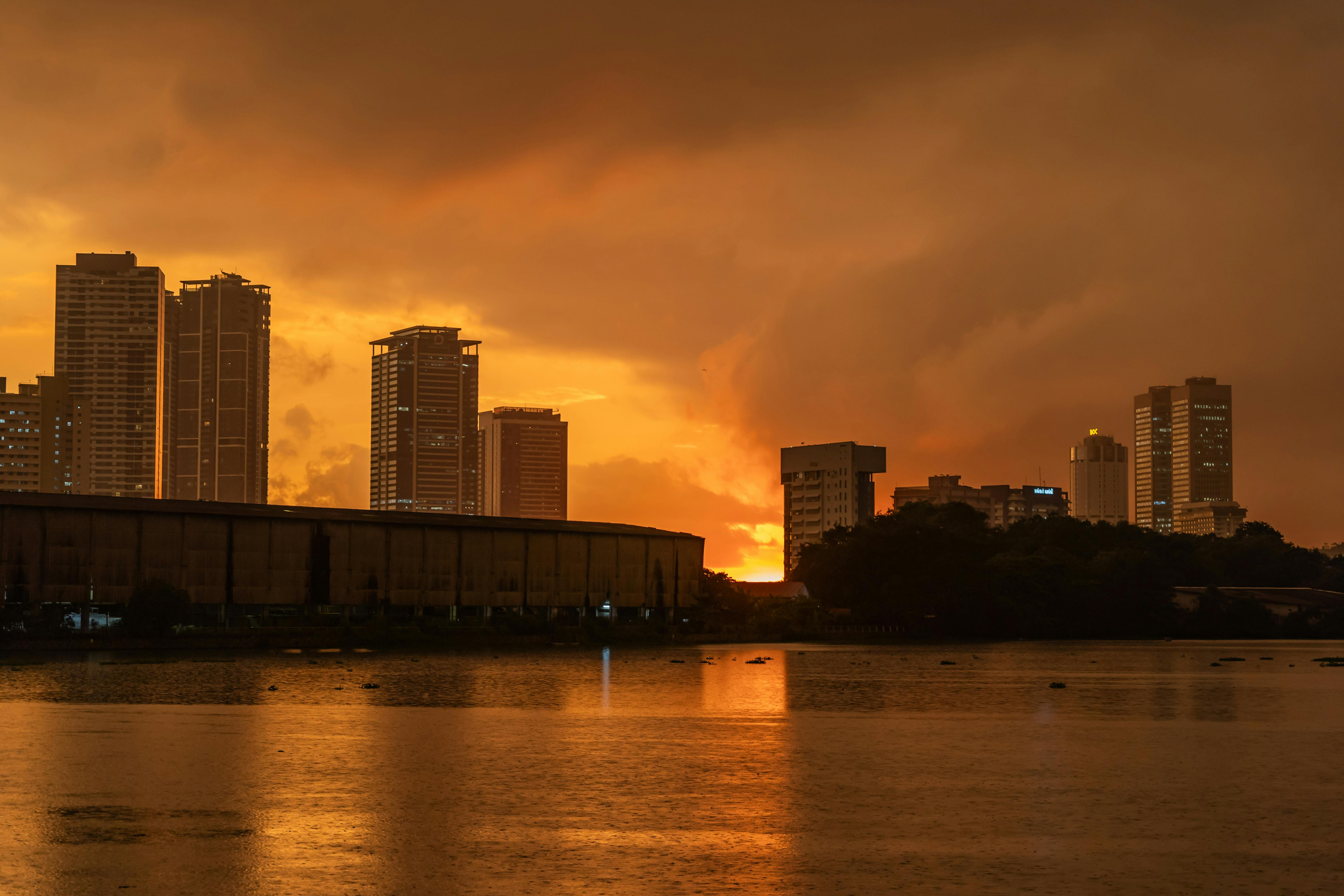
A view of Colombo's dramatic skyline at dusk.

=== City limits ===
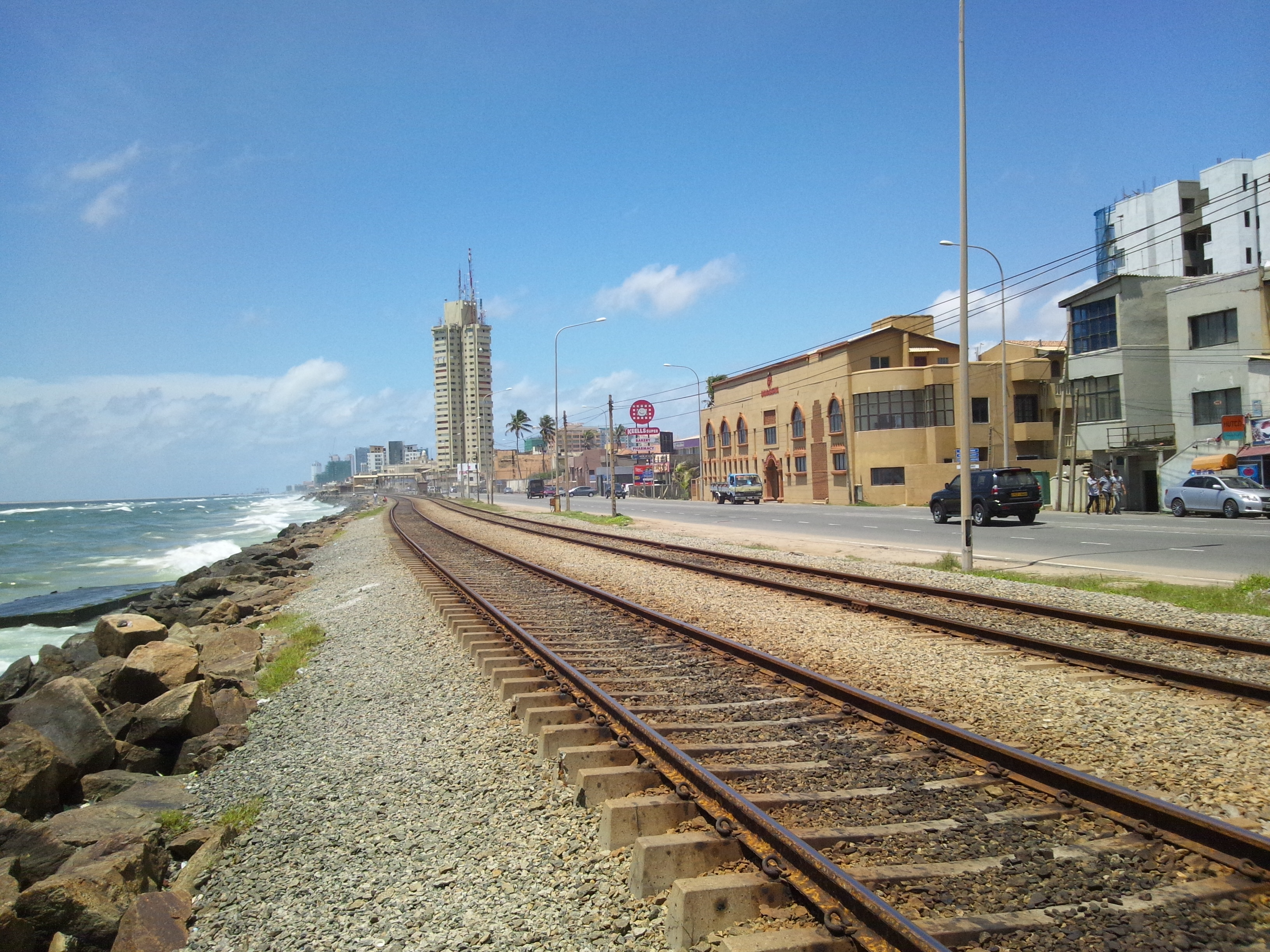
Bambalapitiya area

Colombo is divided into 15 numbered areas for postal purposes and for the convenience of administration, the city is designated through Colombo 1 to Colombo 15, each numbered division corresponding to a specific geographic area. often with its own identity and function. Colombo 1, also known as "Fort" serves as the business district, while Colombo 7 serves as the administrative district of the city.

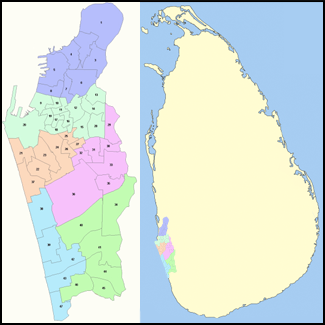
Map of Colombo showing its administrative districts.

Postal number	City suburb
Colombo 1	Fort
Colombo 2	Slave Island, Union Place
Colombo 3	Kollupitiya
Colombo 4	Bambalapitiya
Colombo 5	Havelock Town, Kirulapone, Kirulapone North, Narahenpita
Colombo 6	Wellawatte, Kirulapone South
Colombo 7	Cinnamon Gardens
Colombo 8	Borella
Colombo 9	Dematagoda
Colombo 10	Maradana, Panchikawatte
Colombo 11	Pettah
Colombo 12	Hulftsdorp
Colombo 13	Kotahena, Bloemendhal
Colombo 14	Grandpass
Colombo 15	Modara/Mutwal, Mattakkuliya, Madampitiya

== Economy ==
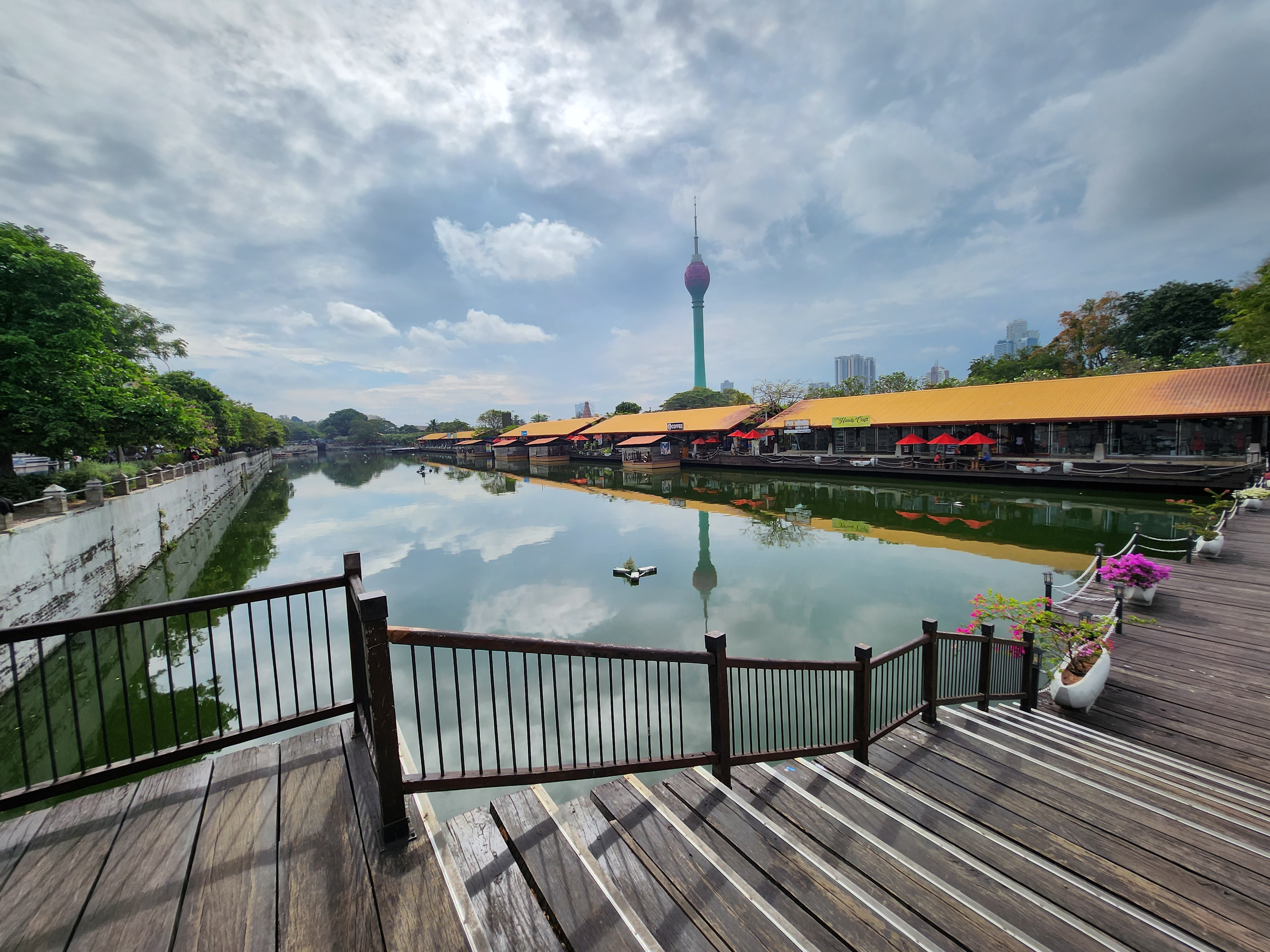
Colombo City is the hub of Sri Lanka's economic activity

The great majority of Sri Lankan corporations have their head offices in Colombo including Aitken Spence, Ceylinco Corporation, Stassen group of companies, John Keells Holdings, Cargills, Hemas Holdings, SenzMate and Akbar Brothers. Some of the industries include chemicals, textiles, glass, cement, leather goods, furniture and jewellery. In the city centre is the World Trade Centre. The 40-story Twin Tower complex is the centre of important commercial establishments, in the Fort district, the city's nerve centre. Right outside the Fort area is Pettah which is derived from the Sinhala word pita which means 'out' or 'outside'.

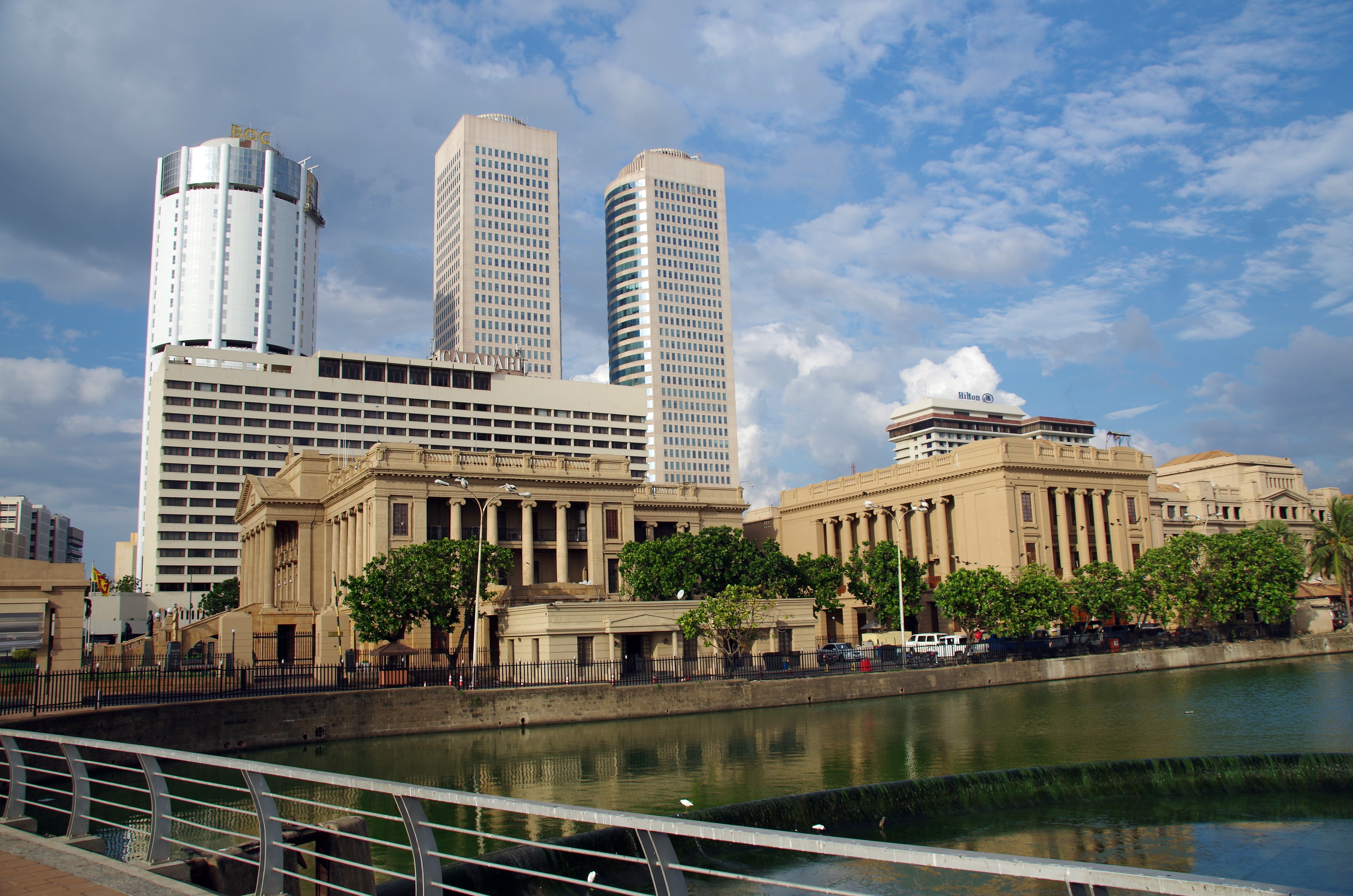
The Old Parliament Building, Bank of Ceylon building and WTC twin towers in the Colombo financial district of Fort

The Colombo Metropolitan area has a GDP (PPP) of $122 billion or 40% of the GDP, making it the most important aspect of the Sri Lankan economy. The per capita income of the Colombo Metro area stood at US$8623 and purchasing power per capita of $25,117, making it one of the most prosperous regions in South Asia. The Colombo Metropolitan (CM) area is the most important industrial, commercial and administrative centre in Sri Lanka. A major share of the country's export-oriented manufacturing takes place in the CM area, which is the engine of growth for Sri Lanka.

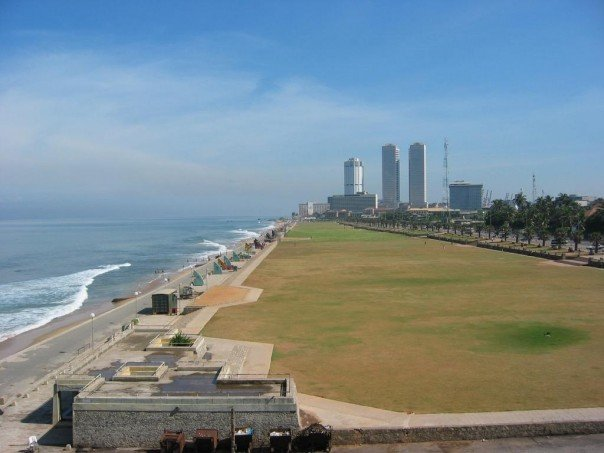
Galle Face Green, where many major events take place, is a favourite location for many. It is in close proximity to many of the major hotels. Formerly, it was the site of the city's racecourse, golf course and the cricket field

The Western province contributes less than 40% to the GDP and about 80% of industrial value additions although it accounts for only 5.7% of the country's geographic area and 25% of the national population. Given its importance as the primary international gateway for Sri Lanka and as the main economic driver of the country, the government of Sri Lanka (GoSL) has launched an ambitious program to transform Colombo and its area into a metropolis of international standards. Bottlenecks are preventing the Colombo metropolitan area from realizing its full economic potential. To facilitate the transformation of Colombo, the government has to address these bottlenecks which have for long been obstructing economic and physical urban regeneration.

Pettah is more crowded than the Fort area. Pettah's roads are always packed and pavements are full of small stalls selling items from delicious sharbat to shirts. Main Street consists mostly of clothes shops and the crossroads, which are known as Cross-Streets where each of the five streets specialises in a specific business. For example, First Cross Street is mostly electronic goods shops, the Second cellular phones and fancy goods. Most of these businesses are dominated by Muslim traders. At the end of Main Street further away from Fort is Sea Street – Sri Lanka's gold market – dominated by Tamil interests. This mile-long street is full of jewellery shops, including the former head office of SriLankan Airlines.

== Law enforcement and crime ==
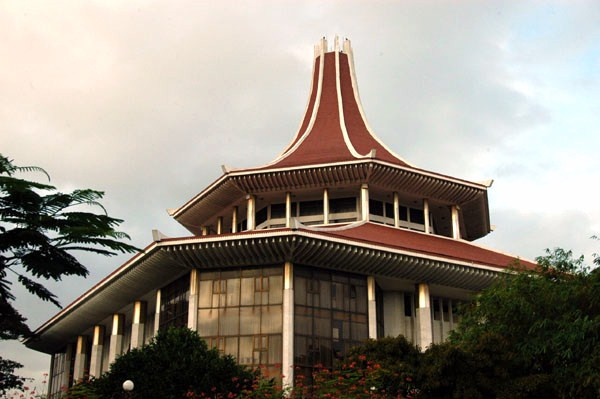
The Supreme Court of Sri Lanka is located in Colombo

The Sri Lanka Police, the main law enforcement agency of the island, liaise with the municipal council but is under the control of the Ministry of Defence of the central government. Policing in Colombo and its suburbs falls within the Metropolitan Range headed by the Deputy Inspector General of Police (Metropolitan), this also includes the Colombo Crime Division. As with most Sri Lankan cities, the magistrate court handles felony crimes while the district court handles civil cases.

As in other large cities around the world, Colombo experiences certain levels of street crime and bribery. Indeed, the corruption extends to the very top, US reports show. In addition, in the period from the 1980s to 2009, there have been a number of major terrorist attacks. The LTTE has been linked to most of the bombings and assassinations in the city. Welikada Prison is situated in Colombo and it is one of the largest maximum-security prisons in the country.

== Infrastructure ==
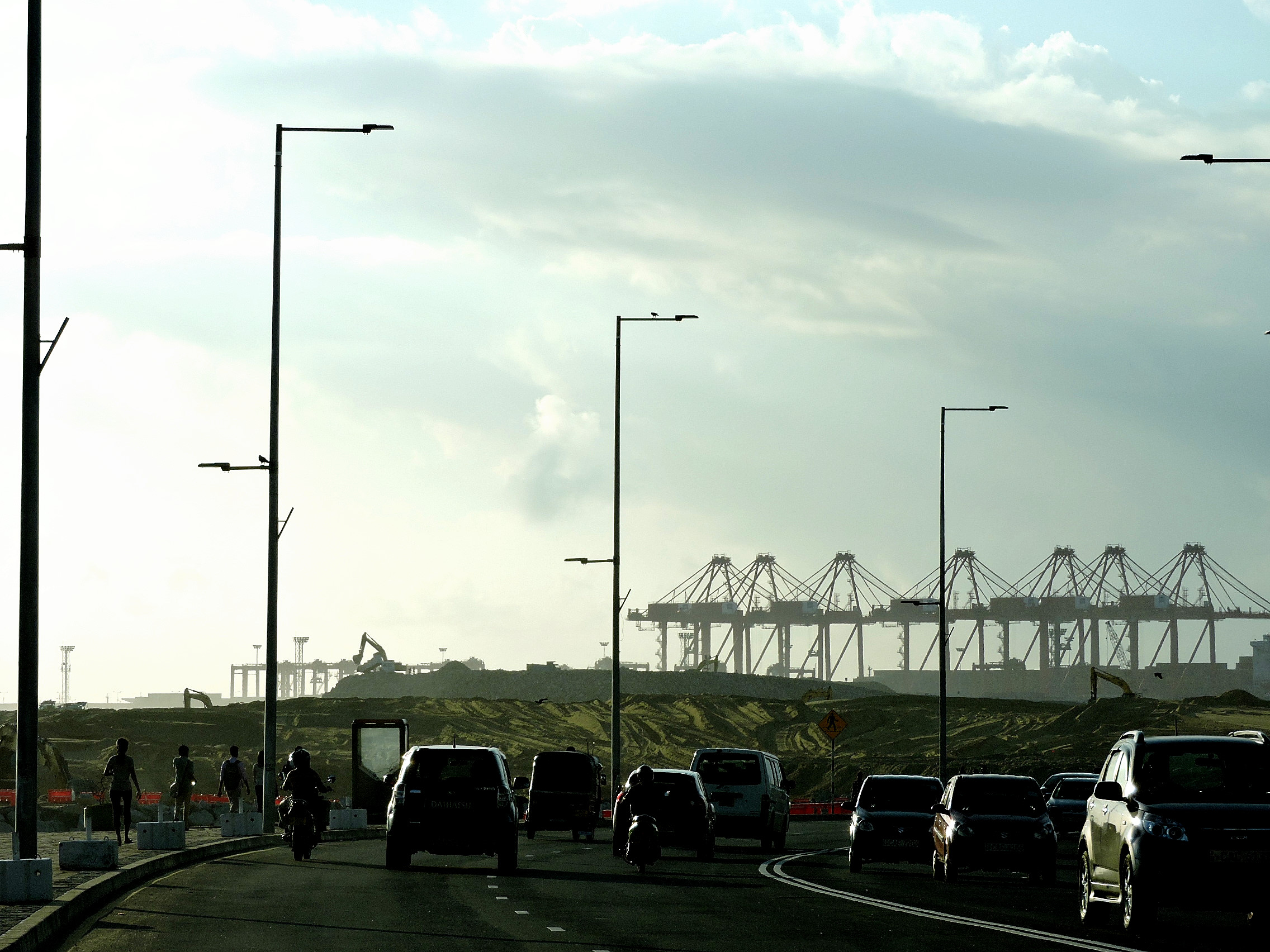
Colombo Galle face road in the evening

Colombo has most of the amenities that a modern city has. Compared to other parts of the country, Colombo has the highest degree of infrastructure. Electricity, water and transport to street lights and phone booths are to a considerably good standard. Apart from that, many luxurious hotels, clubs and restaurants are in the city. In recent times there has been an outpour of high-rise condominiums, mainly due to the very high land prices.

=== Harbour ===
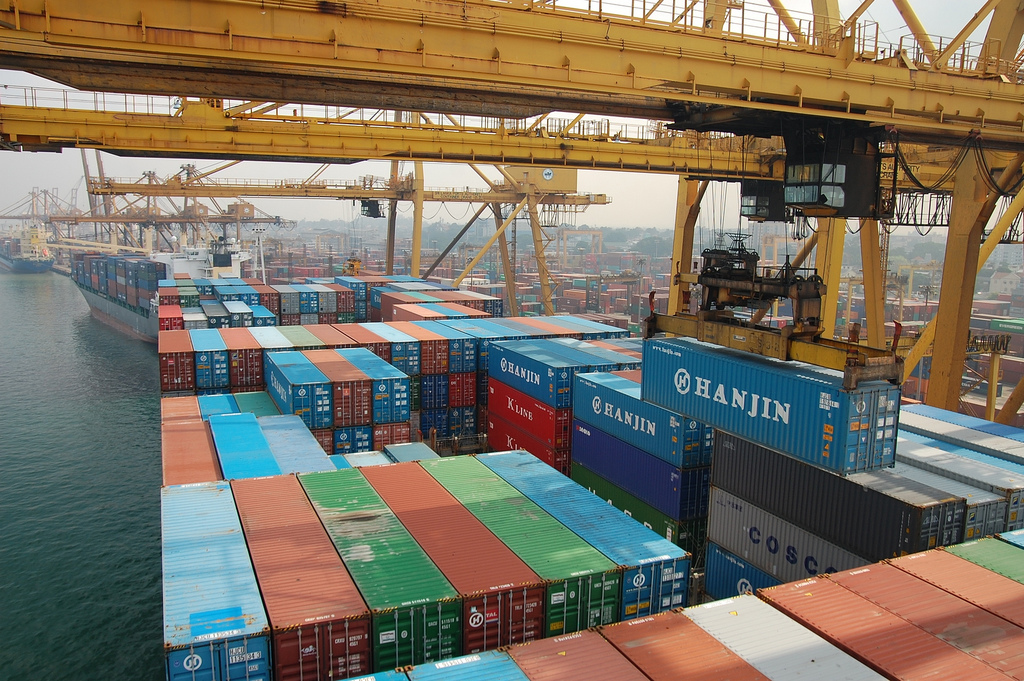
Container handling at Colombo Port.

Colombo Harbour is the largest and one of the busiest ports in Sri Lanka. Colombo was established primarily as a port city during the colonial era, with an artificial harbour that has been expanded over the years. The Sri Lanka Navy maintains a naval base, SLNS Rangalla, within the harbour.

The Port of Colombo handled 3.75 million twenty-foot equivalent units in 2008, 10.6% up on 2007 (which itself was 9.7% up on 2006), bucking the global economic trend. Of those, 817,000 were local shipments with the rest transshipments. With a capacity of 5.7 million TEUs and a dredged depth of over 15 m (49 ft), the Colombo Harbour is one of the busiest ports in the world and ranks among the top 25 ports (23rd). Sri Lanka's Port of Colombo is said to be the busiest, largest port in the Indian Ocean.

Colombo is part of the 21st Century Maritime Silk Road that runs from the Chinese coast to the Upper Adriatic region with its rail connections to Central and Eastern Europe.

=== Transport ===
==== Bus ====
Colombo has an extensive public transport system based on buses operated both by private operators and the government-owned Sri Lanka Transport Board (SLTB). The three primary bus terminals – Bastian Mawatha, Central and the Gunasinghapura Bus Terminals – are in Pettah. Bastian Mawatha handles long-distance services whereas Gunasinghapura and Central handle local services.

The state-owned Lanka Metro Transit (PVT) LTD is in charge of running low-floor fully air-conditioned accessible buses (named "Metro Buses") throughout the Western Region Megapolis area, with buses connecting Colombo itself and its immediate suburbs. The Makumbura Multimodal Transport Centre acts as an important connection hub with regional buses, long-distance buses, rail as well as Katunayake Bandaranaike airport shuttles.

==== Rail ====
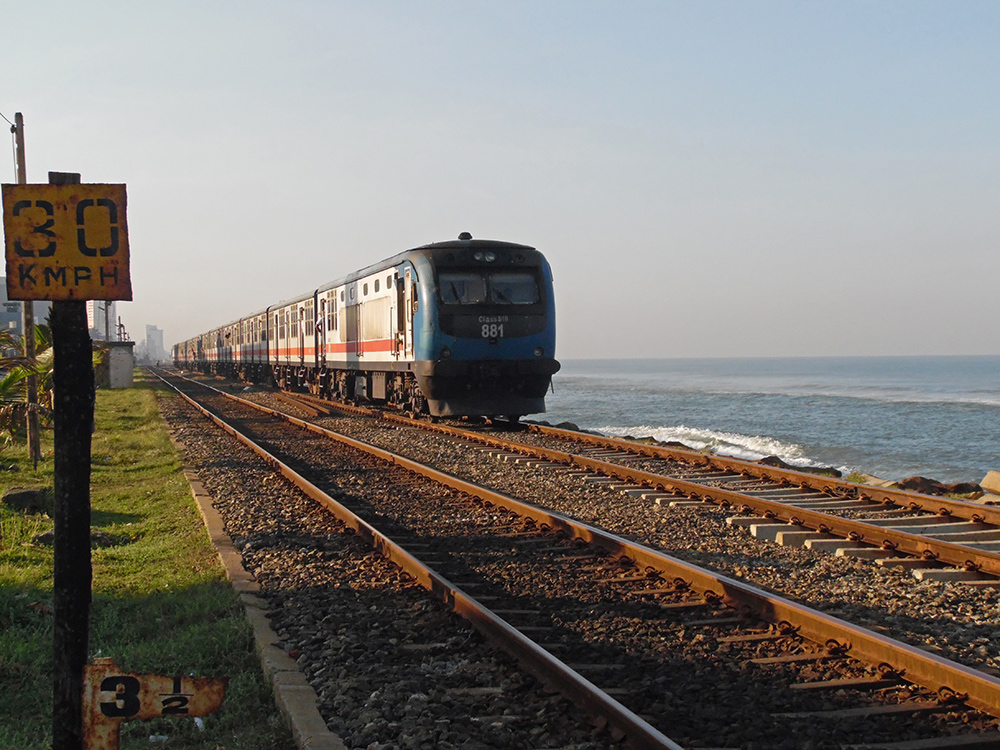
Commuter rail within the city

Train transport in the city is limited since most trains are meant for transport to and from the city rather than within it and are often overcrowded. However, the Central Bus Stand and Fort Railway Station function as the island's primary hub for bus and rail transport respectively. Up until the 1970s, the city had tram services, which were discontinued. Other means of transport include auto rickshaws (commonly called "three-wheelers") and taxicabs. Three-wheelers are entirely operated by individuals and hardly regulated whilst cab services are run by private companies and are metered.

- Main Line – Colombo Fort to Veyangoda; onwards to Kandy, Badulla, Matale, Kurunegala, Anuradhapura, Jaffna, Kankesanturai. Trincomalee, Batticaloa, Talaimannar (presently just Madhu Road).
- Coastal Line – Colombo to Panadura; onwards to Galle, Matara and Beliaththa.
- Puttalam Line – Colombo to Ja-Ela; onwards to Negombo and Puttalam.
- Kelani Valley Line – Colombo to Avissawella.

==== Roads ====
Post-war development in the Colombo area also involves the construction of numerous expressway grade arterial road routes. The first of these constructed is the Southern Expressway, which goes from Kottawa, a southern suburb of Colombo, to Matara City in the south of the country. Expressways constructed in the Colombo metropolitan area include the Colombo–Katunayake Expressway, which was opened in October 2013 and the Colombo orbital bypass Outer Circular Highway (Arthur C. Clarke Expressway). The Colombo-Katunayake Expressway (E03) runs from Peliyagoda, a northern suburb of Colombo, to Colombo International Airport and it is linked with one of the major commercial hubs and a major tourist destination of the country, the city of Negombo.

- A1 highway connects Colombo with Kandy.
- A2 highway connects Colombo with Galle and Matara
- A3 highway connects Colombo with Negombo and Puttalam
- A4 highway connects Colombo with Ratnapura and Batticaloa

==== Ferry ====
An international ferry liner, the Scotia Prince, is conducting a ferry service to Tuticorin, India. Ferry services between the two countries have been revived after more than 20 years.

==== Air ====
Ratmalana Airport is the city's airport, located 15 km (9.3 mi) south of the city centre. It commenced operating in 1935 and was the country's first international airport until it was replaced by Bandaranaike Airport in 1967. Ratmalana Airport now primarily services domestic flights, aviation training and international corporate flights.

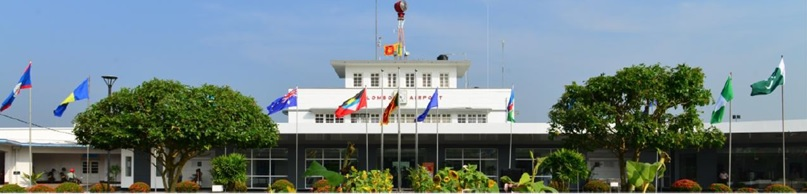
Ratmalana Airport

=== Landmarks ===
The two World Trade Centre towers used to be the most recognised landmarks of the city. Before they were completed in 1997, the adjacent Bank of Ceylon tower was the tallest structure and the most prominent city landmark. Before the skyscrapers were built, the Old Parliament Building that stood in the Fort district with the Old Colombo Lighthouse close to it used to be the tallest building. Another important landmark is the Independence Hall at Independence Square in Cinnamon Gardens.

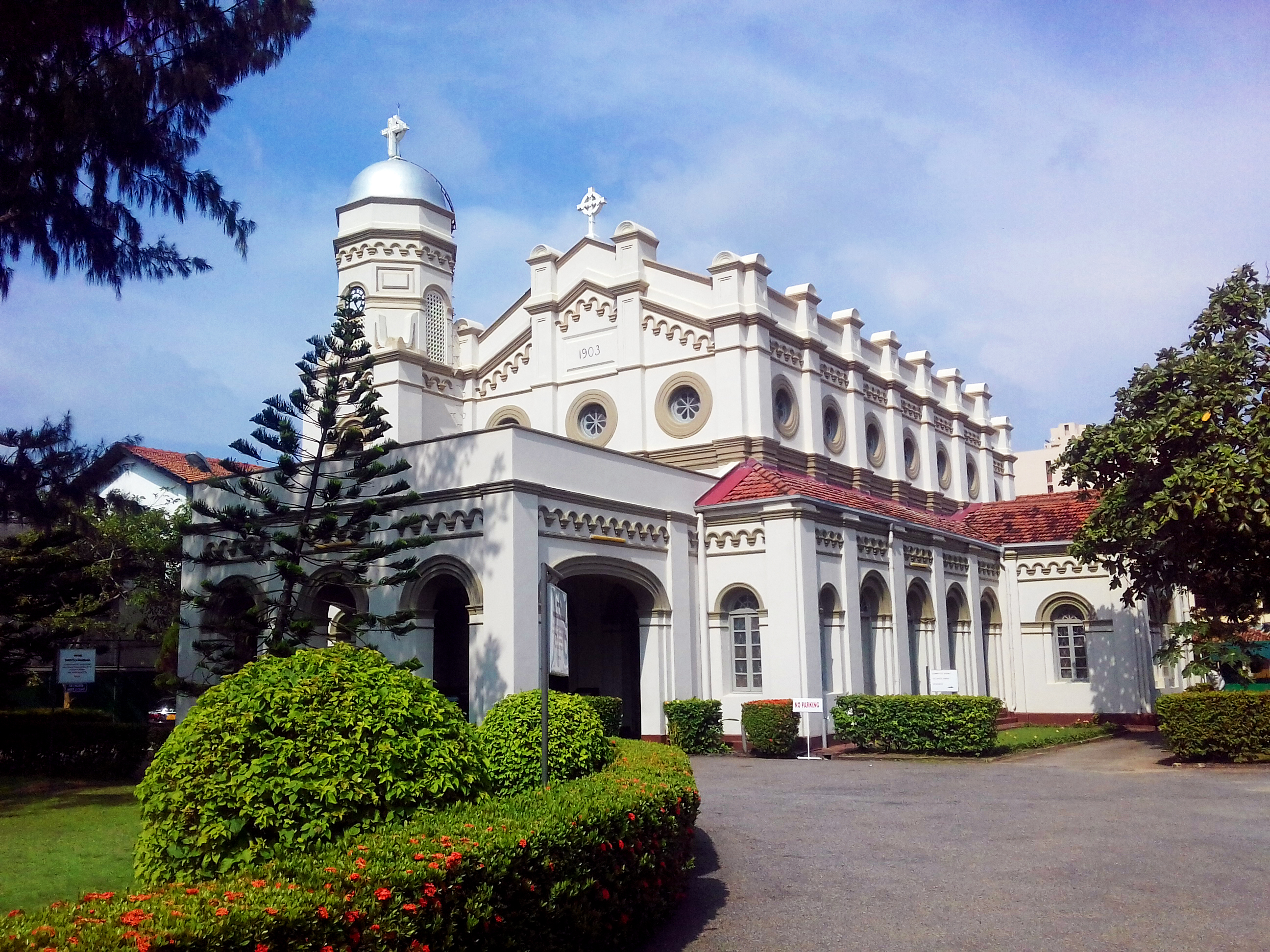
St Paul's Church in Milagiriya

Another landmark is St Paul's Church, Milagiriya, one of the oldest churches in Sri Lanka, first built by the Portuguese and rebuilt by the British in 1848. The Cargills & Millers building in Fort is also a protected building of historical significance.

Cannons that were once mounted on the rampart of the old fort of Colombo were laid out for observance and prestige at the Green. The colonial styled Galle Face Hotel, known as Asia's Emerald on the Green since 1864, is adjacent to Galle Face Green. The hotel has played host to guests such as the British royal family and other royal guests and celebrities. After a stay at the hotel, Princess Alexandra of Denmark commented that "the peacefulness and generosity encountered at the Galle Face Hotel cannot be matched." Also facing Galle Face Green is the Ceylon Inter-Continental Hotel.

== Education ==
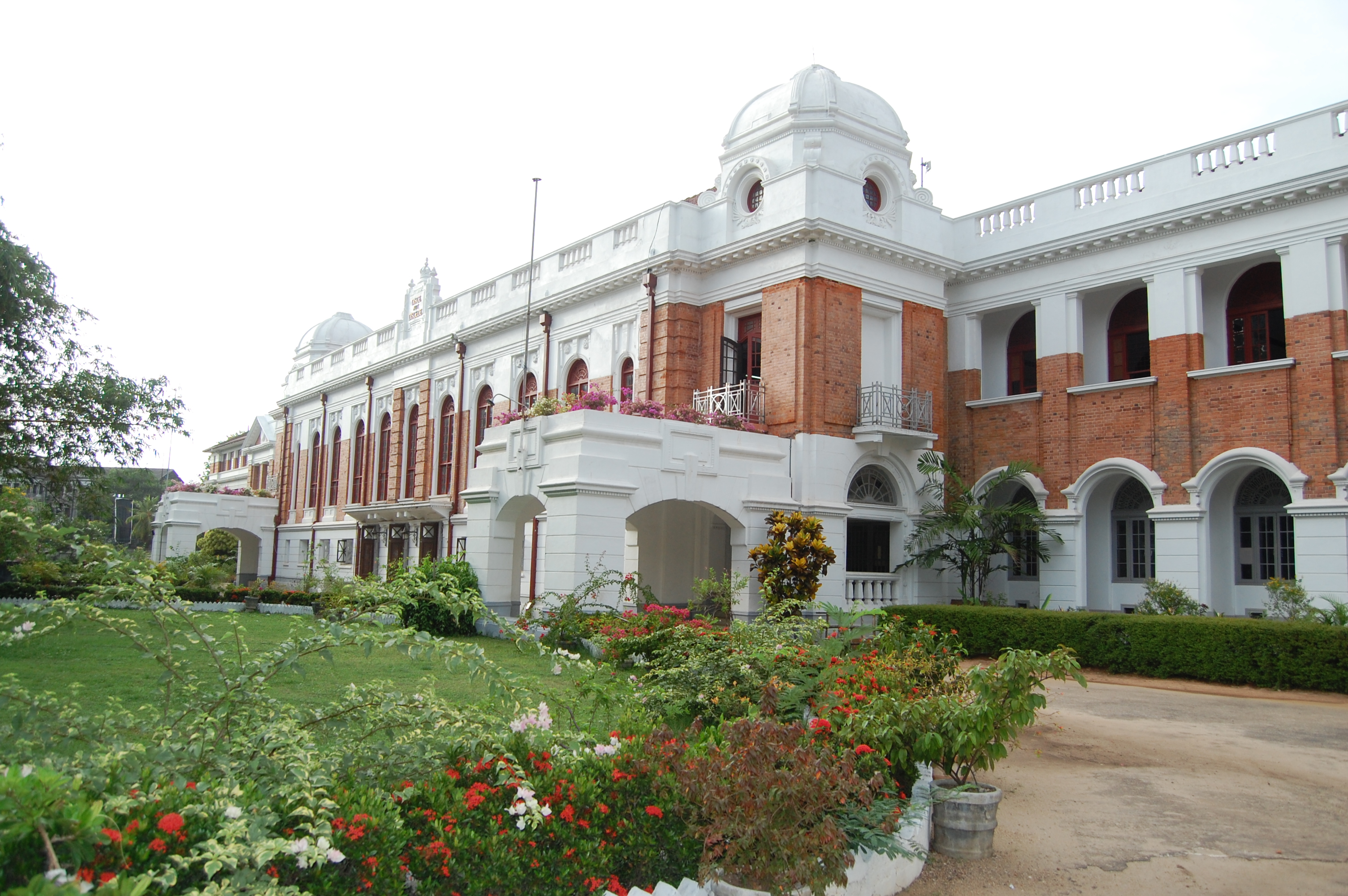
Royal College Colombo, the oldest public school in the city.

Education institutions in Colombo have a long history. Colombo has many of the prominent public schools in the country, some of them government-owned and others private. Most of the prominent schools in the city date back to the 1800s when they were established during the British colonial rule, such as the Royal College Colombo established in 1835. Certain urban schools of Sri Lanka have some religious alignment; this is partly due to the influence of the British, who established Christian missionary schools. These include Anglican schools: Bishop's College (1875); Methodist schools: Wesley College Colombo (1874); Buddhist schools: Ananda College (1886), Nalanda College (1925), Mahanama College (1954); Muslim schools: Zahira College (1892); Catholic schools: St Benedict's College, Colombo (1865), St Joseph's College (1896). The religious alignments do not affect the curriculum of the school except for the demographics of the student population. The secular schools D. S. Senanayake College (1967), and Sirimavo Bandaranaike Vidyalaya (1973), Thurstan College (1950) and Isipathana College (1952) have been established in the post independence era. Colombo has many International Schools that have come up in recent years.

Higher education in the city has a long history, beginning with the establishment of the Colombo Medical School (1870), the Colombo Law College (1875), the School of Agriculture (1884) and the Government Technical College (1893). The first step in the creation of a university in Colombo was taken in 1913 with the establishment of the University College Colombo which prepared students for the external examinations of the University of London. This was followed by the establishment of the University of Ceylon in Colombo. Today the University of Colombo and the University of the Visual & Performing Arts are state universities in the city. The Sri Lanka Institute of Information Technology has a metropolitan campus in the city centre. There are several private higher education institutions in the city.

== Architecture ==
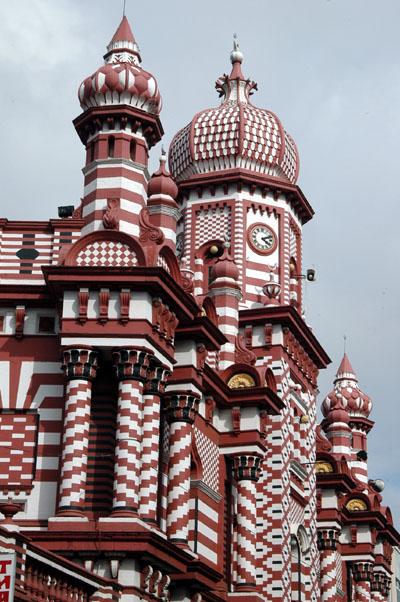
The Red Mosque

Colombo has widely varying architecture that spans centuries and depicts many styles. Colonial buildings influenced by the Portuguese, Dutch and British exist alongside structures built in Buddhist, Hindu, Islamic, Indian and Contemporary architectural styles. No other place is this more evident than in the Fort area. Here, one may find new, towering skyscrapers as well as historic buildings dating far back as the 1700s.

=== Colombo Fort ===
The Portuguese were the first colonists to settle in Colombo. Establishing a small trading post, they had laid the foundations for a small fort which in time became the largest colonial fort on the island. The Dutch expanded the fort, thus creating a well fortified harbour. This came into the possession of the British in the late 1700s, and by the late 19th century, seeing no threat to the Colombo Harbour, began demolishing the ramparts to make way for the development of the city. Although now there is nothing left of the fortifications, the area which was once the fort is still referred to as Fort. The area outside is Pettah, Sri Lanka or පිටකොටුව ('Pitakotuwa') in Sinhala, which means outer fort.

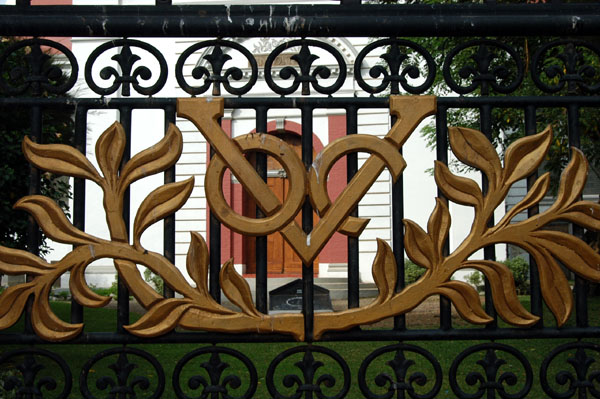
The VOC (Verenigde Oostindische Compagnie) logo of Dutch East India Company on the gates of Wolvendaal Church

=== Dutch-era buildings ===
There are none of the buildings of the Portuguese era and only a few from the Dutch period. These include the oldest building in the fort area, the former Dutch Hospital, the Dutch House which is now the Colombo Dutch Museum and several churches. The President's House (formerly the Queen's House) was originally the Dutch governor's house and successive British governors made it their office and residence. However, it has undergone much change since the Dutch period. Adjoining the President's House are the Gordon Gardens, now off-limits to the public.

=== British-era buildings ===
Much of the old buildings of the fort area and in other parts of the city date back to British times; these include governmental, commercial buildings, and private houses. Some of the notable government building of British colonial architecture includes the old Parliament building, which is now the Presidential Secretariat; the Republic Building, which houses the Ministry of Foreign affairs but once housed the Ceylon Legislative council; the General Treasury Building; the old General Post Office, an Edwardian-style building opposite the President's House; the Prime Minister's Office; the Central Telegraph Office; and the Mathematics department of the University of Colombo (formally the Royal College, Colombo). Notable commercial buildings of the British era include the Galle Face Hotel, Cargills and Millers' complex, and the Grand Oriental Hotel.

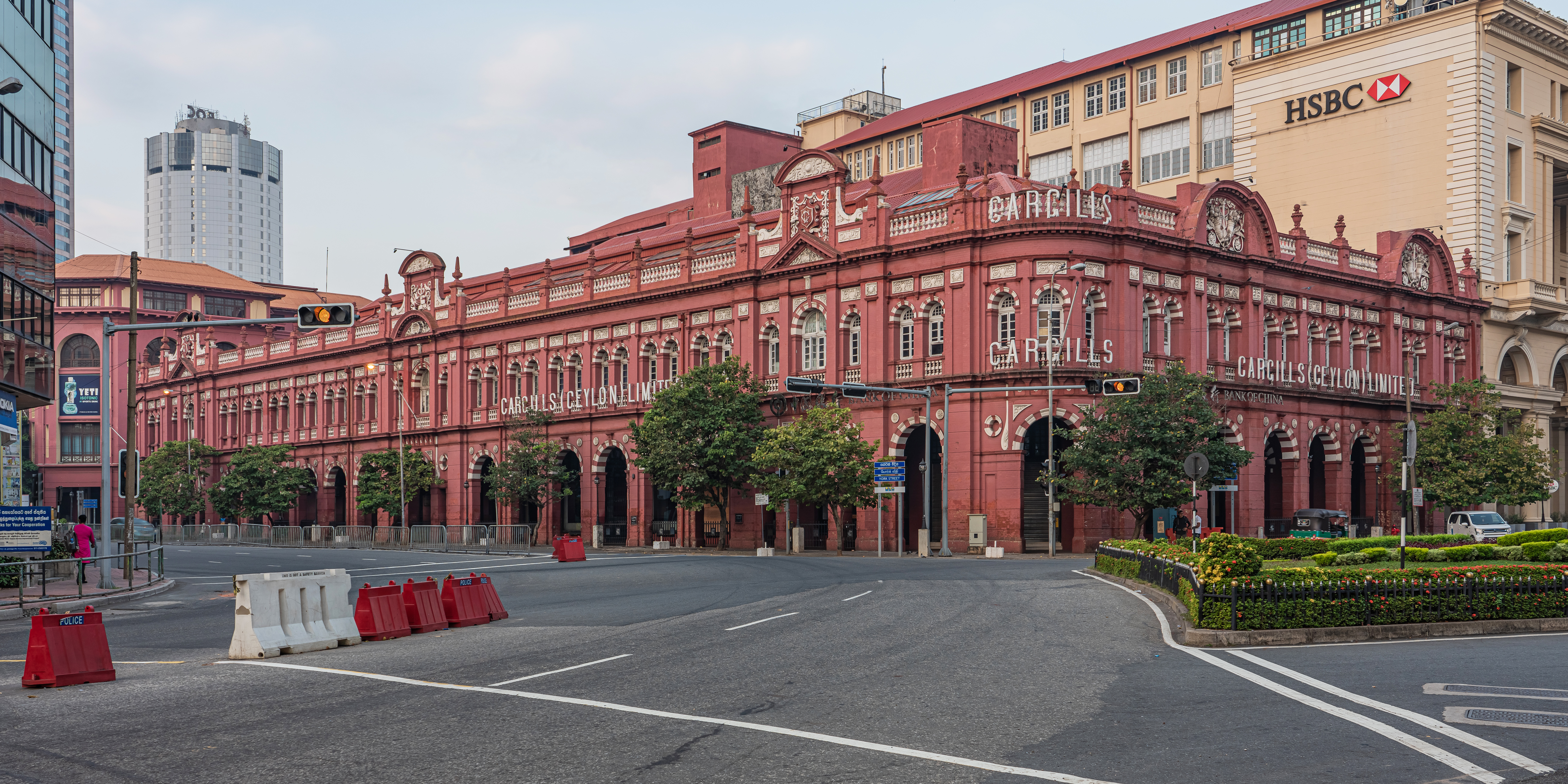
The historical Cargills & Millers building continues as the headquarters of Cargills

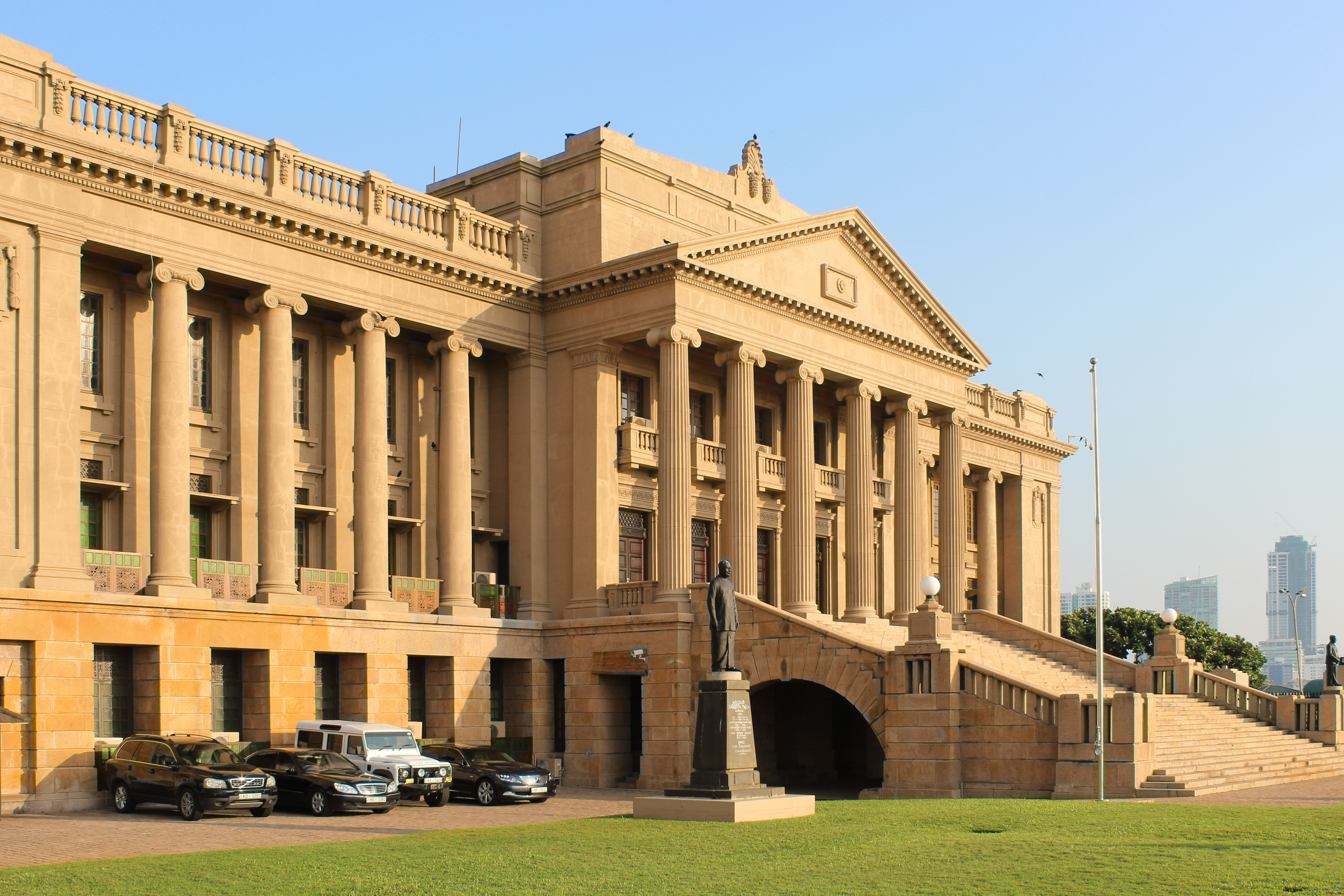
The Old Parliament Building near the Galle Face Green, now the Presidential Secretariat

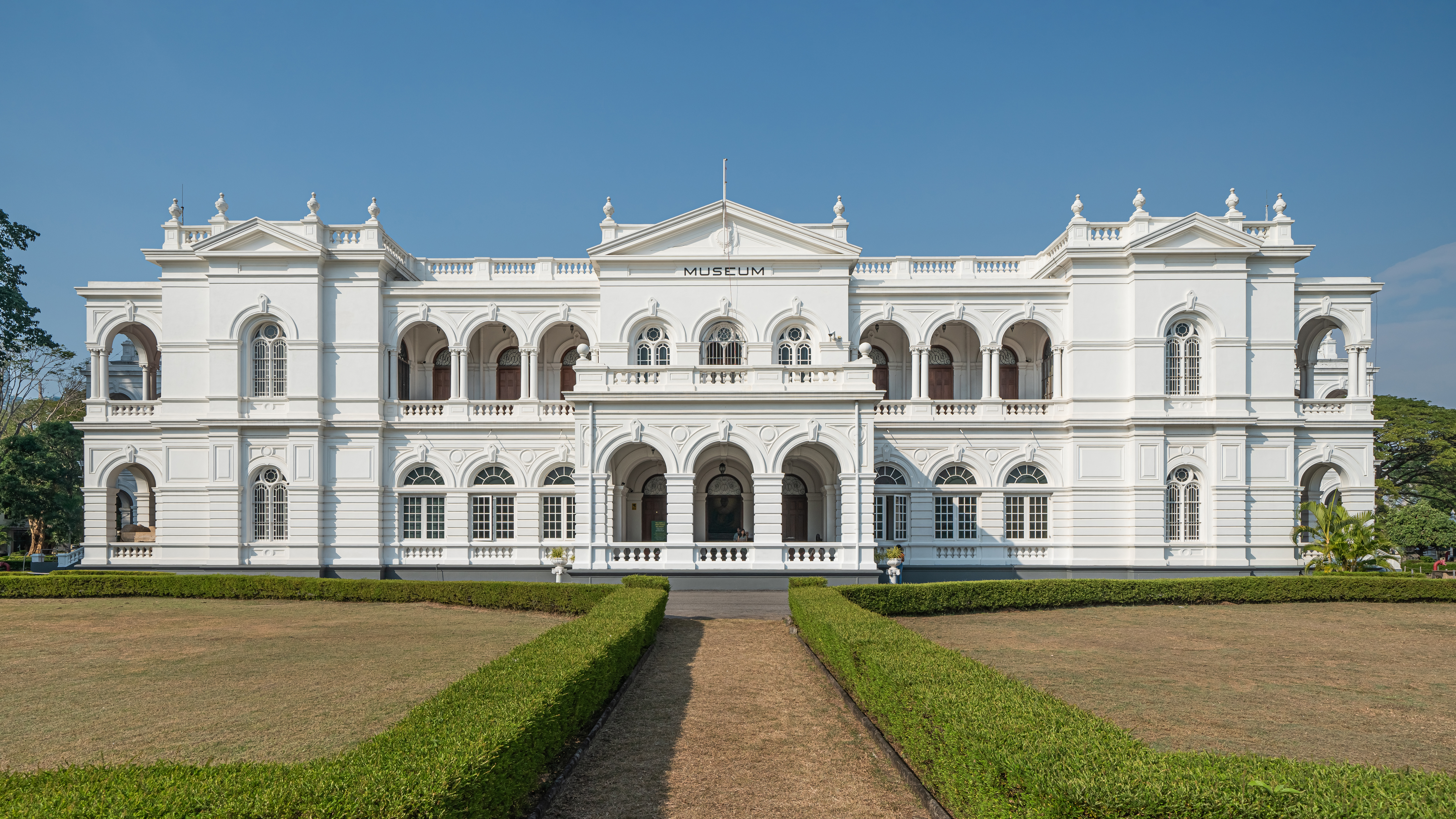
The Neoclassical style Colombo National Museum

== Culture ==
=== Annual cultural events and fairs ===
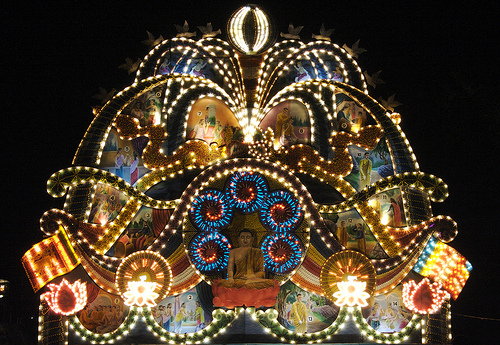
Vesak Thorana in Colombo

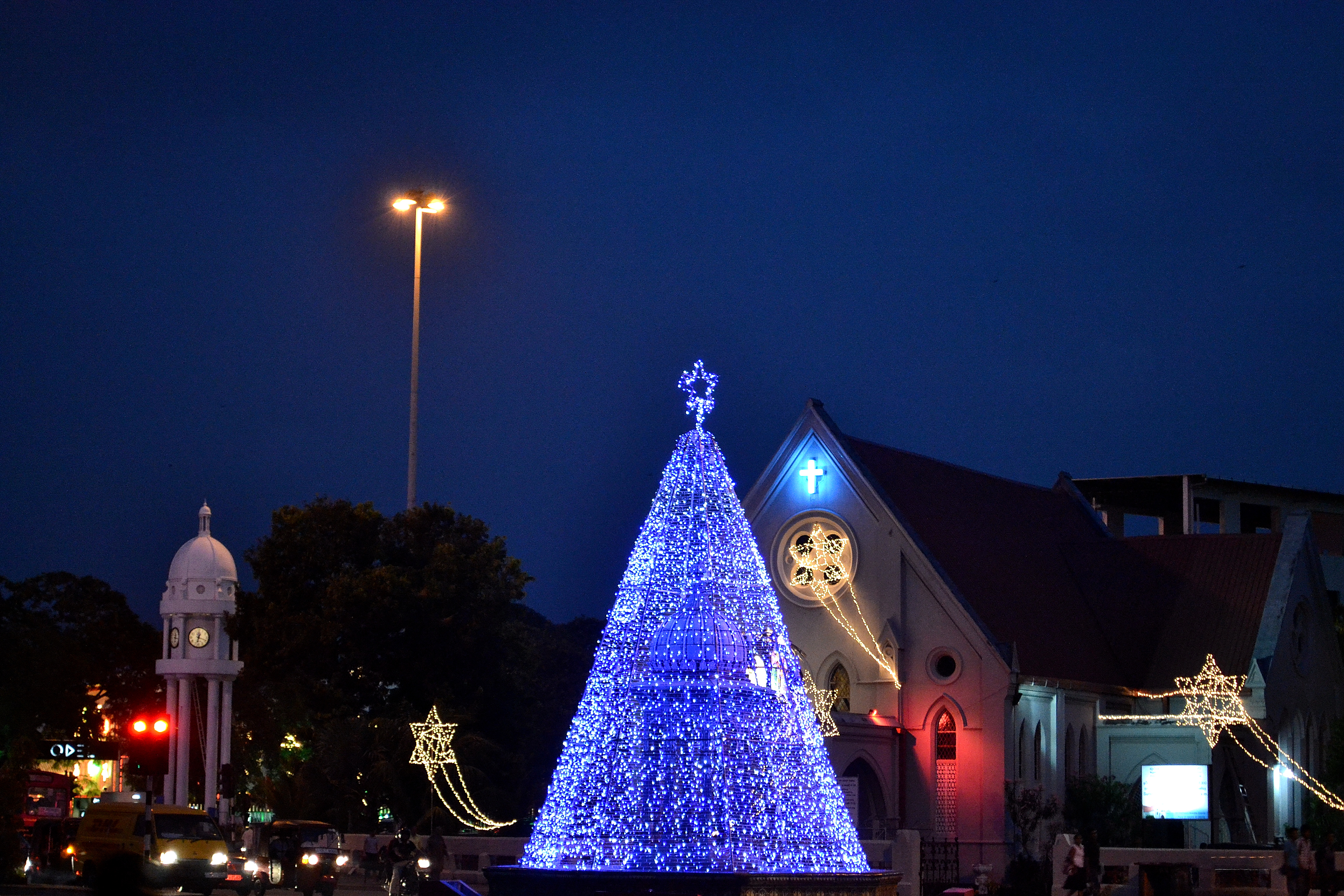
Christmas Celebrations in Colombo

Colombo's most popular festival is the celebration of Buddha's birth, enlightenment and death all falling on the same day. In Sinhala this is known as Vesak. During this festival, much of the city is decorated with lanterns, lights and special displays of light (known as thoran). The festival falls in mid-May and lasts a week. Many Sri Lankans visit the city to see the lantern competitions and decorations. During this week people distribute, rice, drinks and other food items for free in dunsal which means charity place. These dunsal are popular amongst visitors from the suburbs.

Since there is a large number of Muslims in Colombo, Eid Ul Fitr and Eid Ul Adha are two Islamic festivals that are celebrated in Colombo. Many businesses flourish during the eventual countdown for Eid Ul Fitr which is a major Islamic festival celebrated by Muslims after a month-long fasting. Colombo is generally very busy on the eve of the festivals as people do their last-minute shopping.

Christmas is another major festival. Although Sri Lanka's Christians make up only just over 7% of the population, Christmas is one of the island's biggest festivals. Most streets and commercial buildings light up from the beginning of December and festive sales begin at all shopping centres and department stores. Carolling and nativity plays are frequent sights during the season.

The Sinhalese and Tamil New Year is a cultural event that takes place on 13 and 14 April. The festivities include many events and traditions that display a great deal of Sri Lankan culture. Several old clubs of the city give a glimpse of the British equestrian lifestyle; these include the Colombo Club, Orient Club, the 80 Club, and the Colombo Cricket Club.

=== Performing arts ===
The Nelum Pokuna Mahinda Rajapaksa Theatre is a major venue for the performing arts

Colombo has several performing arts centres, which are popular for their musical and theatrical performances, including the Lionel Wendt Theatre, the Elphinstone, and Tower Hall, all of which were made for western-style productions. The Navarangahala found in the city is the country's first national theatre designed and built for Asian and local style musical and theatrical productions.

The Nelum Pokuna Mahinda Rajapaksa Theatre is a world-class theatre that opened in December 2011. Designed in the form of the Lotus Pond in Polonnaruwa, the theatre is a major theatre destination.

=== Museums and art collections ===
The National Museum of Colombo, established on 1 January 1877 during the tenure of the British Colonial Governor Sir William Henry Gregory, is in the Cinnamon Gardens area. The museum houses the crown jewels and throne of the last king of the kingdom of Kandy, Sri Vikrama Rajasinha.

There is also the Colombo Dutch Museum detailing the Dutch colonial history of the country. Colombo does not boast a very big art gallery. There is a small collection of random Sri Lankan paintings at the Art Gallery in Green Path; next to it is the Natural History Museum.

=== Sports ===
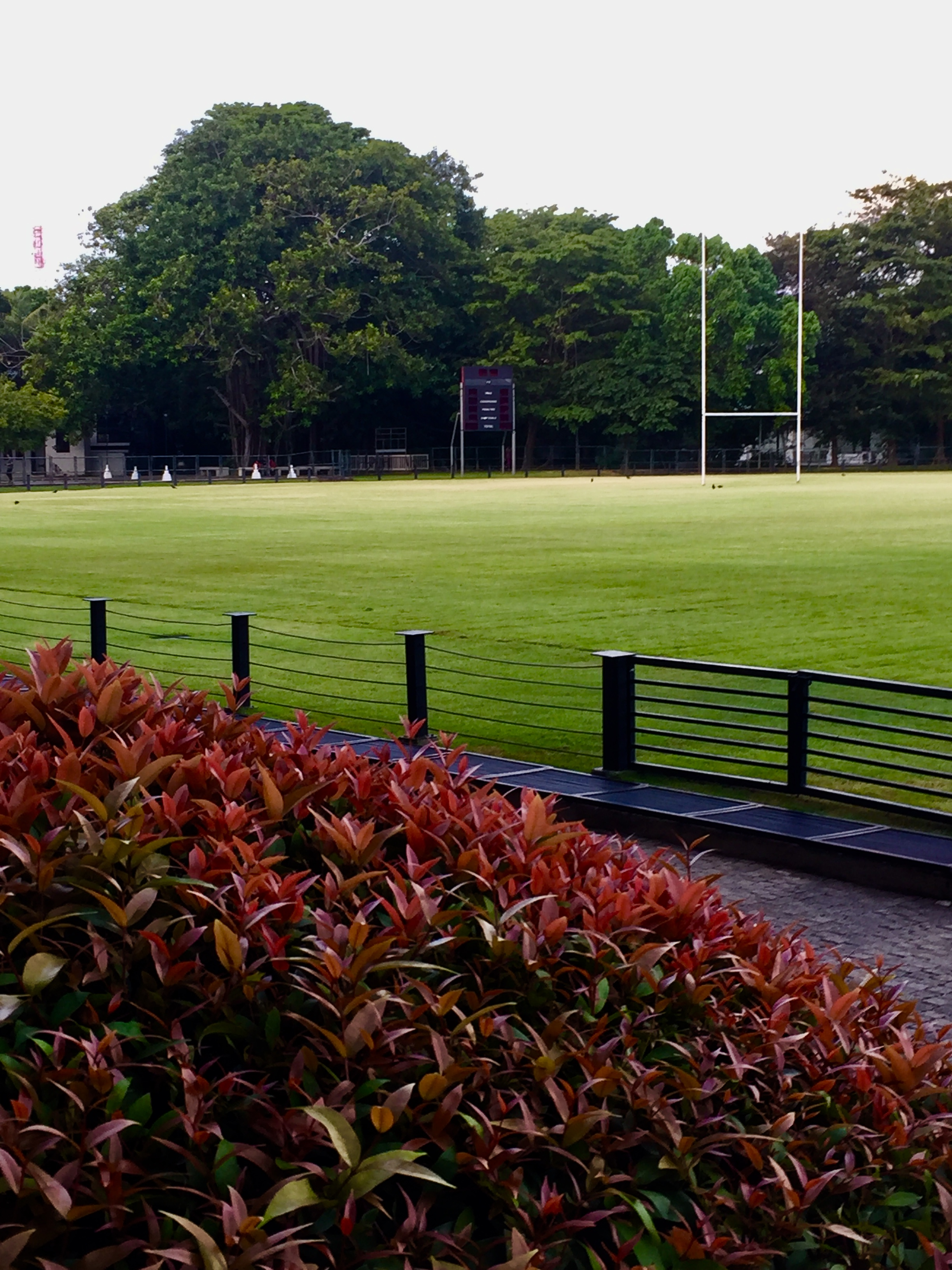
Colombo Racecourse ground

One of the most popular sports in Sri Lanka is cricket. The country emerged as champions of the 1996 Cricket World Cup and became runners up in 2007 and 2011. In the ICC World Twenty20 they became runners up in 2009 and 2012 and winners in 2014. The sport is played in parks, playgrounds, beaches and even in the streets. Colombo is the home for two of the country's most popular international cricket stadiums, Singhalese Sports Club's Cricket Stadium and R. Premadasa Stadium (named after late president Premadasa). Colombo Kaps represents the city in Lanka Premier League.

Colombo has the distinction of being the only city in the world to have four cricket test venues in the past: Paikiasothy Saravanamuttu Stadium, Singhalese Sports Club Cricket Ground, Colombo Cricket Club Ground and Ranasinghe Premadasa Stadium. The Sugathadasa Stadium is an international standard stadium for athletics, swimming and football, also held the South Asian Games in 1991 and 2006. Situated in Colombo the Royal Colombo Golf Club is one of the oldest in Asia. Other sporting clubs in Colombo include Colombo Swimming Club, Colombo Rowing Club and the Yachting Association of Sri Lanka.

Rugby is also a popular sport at the club and school levels. Colombo has its local football team Colombo FC and the sport is being developed as a part of the FIFA Goal program.

The Colombo Port City is to include a new Formula One track, constructed in the vicinity of the Colombo Harbour. According to Dr Priyath Wickrama, the Chairman of the Sri Lanka Ports Authority, an eight-lane F1 track will "definitely" be a part of the New Port City. This would host the Sri Lankan Grand Prix.

Colombo Marathon is an internationally recognised marathon established in 1998.

=== Media ===
Almost all major media businesses in Sri Lanka operate from Colombo. The state media has its offices in Bullers Road and carries out regional transmissions from there. These include the Sri Lanka Broadcasting Corporation (SLBC), formerly known as Radio Ceylon, and the Sri Lanka Rupavahini Corporation. The SLBC is the oldest radio station in South Asia and the second oldest in the world. Many private broadcasting companies have their offices and transmission stations in or around Colombo. As with most metro areas, radio bands are highly utilised for radio communications. Some of the prominent radio stations broadcasting in the Colombo area are Sirasa FM, FM Derana, Hiru FM, Shakthi FM, Vettri FM, Sooriyan FM, Kiss FM, Lite FM, Yes FM, Gold FM, Sith FM, Y FM, E FM and many more.

Television networks operating in the Colombo metro area include the state-owned television broadcasting networks which are broadcast by the Rupavahini Corporation of Sri Lanka, broadcasting television in the official languages Sinhala and Tamil. English language television is also broadcast, more targeted to the demographics of the English speaking Sri Lankans, expatriate communities and tourists. There are as well several private operators. Many of the privately run television station networks were often based upon operational expansions of pre-existing commercial radio networks and broadcast infrastructure.

== Twin towns and sister cities ==
Country	City	State / Region	Since
Nepal	Biratnagar	Morang District	1874
Russia	Saint Petersburg	N/A	1997
China	Shanghai	N/A	2003
Mongolia	Ulaanbaatar	–	2012
Maldives	Malé	Kaafu Atoll	2013
Maldives	Maroshi	Shaviyani Atoll	2015

== Notable people ==
See Category:People from Colombo

== Gallery ==
Colombo's colonial heritage is visible throughout the city, as in the historical Wolvendaal Church, established by the Dutch in 1749	St. Lucia's Cathedral, the seat of the Archbishop of the Roman Catholic Archdiocese of Colombo
Viharamahadevi Park, formerly Victoria Park, is the oldest and largest park in Colombo	The Town Hall of Colombo, it is the headquarters of the Colombo Municipal Council and the office of the Mayor of Colombo
The Nelum Pokuna Mahinda Rajapaksa Theatre at night	Port City Colombo, a multi-services special economic zone located in Colombo, which is currently under construction
The Bandaranaike Memorial International Conference Hall (BMICH), a convention center located in Colombo	The Lotus Tower, the 19th tallest tower in the world
R. Premadasa Stadium, formerly Khettarama Stadium, is the largest international cricket stadium in Sri Lanka with a capacity of 35,000	Jami Ul-Alfar Mosque, commonly known as Red Mosque, is one of the oldest mosques in Colombo

== See also ==
- Colombo Town Guard
- List of mayors of Colombo
- List of tallest buildings and structures in Sri Lanka
- National War Memorial, Colombo
- Place names in Sri Lanka
- South Asian capitals
