= List of national capitals in East, South, and Southeast Asia =

This is a list of East, South, and Southeast Asian capitals.

== East Asia ==
Name	Country	View	Population	Mayor or governor or president
Beijing	China		21,542,000 (2018, municipality)	Yin Yong
Pyongyang	North Korea		2,870,000 (2016)	Kim Su-gil
Seoul	South Korea		9,963,000 (2020)	Oh Se-hoon
Taipei	Taiwan		2,646,000 (2019); Metropolitan: 8,535,000 (2019)	Chiang Wan-an
Tokyo	Japan		13,929,300 (2019); Metropolitan: 27,140,000 (2019)	Yuriko Koike
Ulaanbaatar	Mongolia		1,372,000 (2013)	Khishgeegiin Nyambaatar

== South Asia ==
Name	Nation	View	Population	Mayor or governor
Dhaka	Bangladesh		6,594,962 (2013)	North Dhaka: Atiqul Islam South Dhaka: Sheikh Fazle Noor Taposh
Islamabad	Pakistan		1,330,000 (2011)	Vacant
Kabul	Afghanistan		3,895,000 (2011)	Hamdullah Nomani
Kathmandu	Nepal		822,930	Balen Shah
Malé	Maldives		81,647	Adam Azim
New Delhi	India		16,321,883	Shelly Oberoi
Sri Jayawardenepura Kotte (administrative capital) Colombo (commercial capital)	Sri Lanka		5,648,000	Sri Jayawardenepura Kotte : Madhura Vithanage Colombo : Vacant
Thimphu	Bhutan		50,000	Ugyen Dorji

== Southeast Asia ==
Name	Nation	View	Population	Mayor or governor
Bandar Seri Begawan	Brunei		64,526 (1997)	Amir Azman Haji Abdul Rahman
Bangkok	Thailand		8,305,200 (2019); Metropolitan: 14,626,200 (2019)	Chadchart Sittipunt
Dili	Timor-Leste		222,323 (2015); Metropolitan: 234,331 (2015)	Gregório da Cunha Saldanha
Hanoi	Vietnam		3,642,100 (2019); Metropolitan: 16,100,000 (2019)	Đinh Tiến Dũng
Jakarta (current), Nusantara (under construction, partially completed)	Indonesia		Jakarta City: 10,684,946 (2024); Metropolitan Jakarta: 41,913,860 (2025) Nusantara City: 300,000 (2025); Metropolitan Nusantara: 1,155,805 (2025)	Jakarta: Pramono Anung Wibowo Nusantara: Basuki Hadimuljono
Kuala Lumpur (official), Putrajaya (Federal Administrative center)	Malaysia		City: 1,790,000 (2017); Metropolitan: 7,969,700 (2017)	Kuala Lumpur : Kamarulzaman Mat Salleh Putrajaya : Fadlun Mak Ujud
Manila	Philippines		City: 14,962,000 (2022); Metropolitan: 27,342,891 (2022)	Yorme Isko Domagoso
Naypyidaw	Myanmar		683,000 (2022)	Myo Aung
Phnom Penh	Cambodia		City: 2,129,300 (2019)	Khuong Sreng
Singapore	Singapore		5,896,686 (2021)	N/A
Vientiane	Laos		City: 249,800 (2015); Metropolitan: 820,900 (2015)	Athsphangthong Siphandone
