= Seal of Colombo =

Municipal symbol, Sri Lanka

Seal of the Colombo Municipal Council

The Seal of Colombo is the official seal and logo of the city of Colombo and the municipality council in Sri Lanka. It consists of a coconut tree, which has been the main cultivated crop in the area for centuries in the foreground and the Kelani River that flows by the city along with Adam's Peak.
