= Premadasa =

Premadasa is a Sinhalese name that may refer to the following people:

Surname

- Hema Premadasa (born 1935), Sri Lankan politician and former First Lady of Sri Lanka
- Ranasinghe Premadasa (1924–1993), Prime Minister and President of Sri Lanka
- Sajith Premadasa (born 1967), Sri Lankan politician, the son of Hema and Ranasinghe Premadasa

== See also ==
- Premadasa cabinet (1989–1993)
- R. Premadasa Stadium, Colombo, Sri Lanka
