= Vincent Perera =

Sri Lankan politician

Hon. Vincent Perera

10th Chief Government Whip
- In office 18 February 1989 – 7 April 1993
- President: J. R. Jayewardene; Ranasinghe Premadasa
- Succeeded by: Wimal Wickremasinghe
- In office 23 July 1987 – 15 February 1989
- President: J. R. Jayewardene
- In office 7 September 1978 – 6 July 1987
- President: J. R. Jayewardene
- Preceded by: Kiri Banda Ratnayake

12th Minister of Justice (Sri Lanka)
- In office 1989–1990
- President: Ranasinghe Premadasa
- Preceded by: Nissanka Wijeyeratne
- Succeeded by: Abdul Cader Shahul Hameed

Minister of Environment (Sri Lanka)
- In office ?–?
- President: Ranasinghe Premadasa

2nd Minister of Sports (Sri Lanka)
- In office 23 July 1977 – 1988
- President: J. R. Jayewardene
- Preceded by: Kiri Banda Ratnayake
- Succeeded by: Nanda Mathew

Minister of Parliamentary Affairs
- In office 23 July 1977 – ?
- President: J. R. Jayewardene

Mayor of Colombo
- In office 1970–1973
- Preceded by: Jabir A. Cader
- Succeeded by: A. H. M. Fowzie
- In office 1965–1966
- Preceded by: V. A. Sugathadasa
- Succeeded by: Jabir A. Cader

Member of Parliament for Colombo
- In office 1989–1994

Member of Parliament for Colombo North
- In office 1977–1989
- Preceded by: V. A. Sugathadasa
- Succeeded by: Electoral District Abolished

Personal details
- Born: 21 September 1918
- Died: 7 April 1993 (aged 74)
- Party: United National Party
- Occupation: Clerk

Mathew Vincent Perera (21 September 1918 – 7 April 1993) was a Sri Lankan statesman. He served in multiple cabinet positions and government posts. Perera was also Mayor of Colombo twice.

Perera was among the sixteen people wounded in the August 1987 grenade attack in the Sri Lankan Parliament. Two people, including a parliamentarian, died in that attack.

Political offices
Preceded by Kiri Banda Ratnayake	Chief Government Whip; 1978–1993	Succeeded by Wimal Wickremasinghe
Preceded by Nissanka Wijeyeratne	Minister of Justice; 1989–1990	Succeeded by Abdul Cader Shahul Hameed
Preceded by ?	Minister of Environment ?–?	Succeeded by ?
Preceded by Kiri Banda Ratnayake	Minister of Sports; 1977–1988	Succeeded by Nanda Mathew
Preceded by ?	Minister of Parliamentary Affairs; 1977–?	Succeeded by ?
Preceded by Jabir A. Cader	Mayor of Colombo; 1970–1973	Succeeded by A. H. M. Fowzie
Preceded by V. A. Sugathadasa	Mayor of Colombo; 1965–1966	Succeeded by Jabir A. Cader
