= Town Hall, Colombo =

Headquarters of the Colombo Municipal Council

Colombo Town Hall
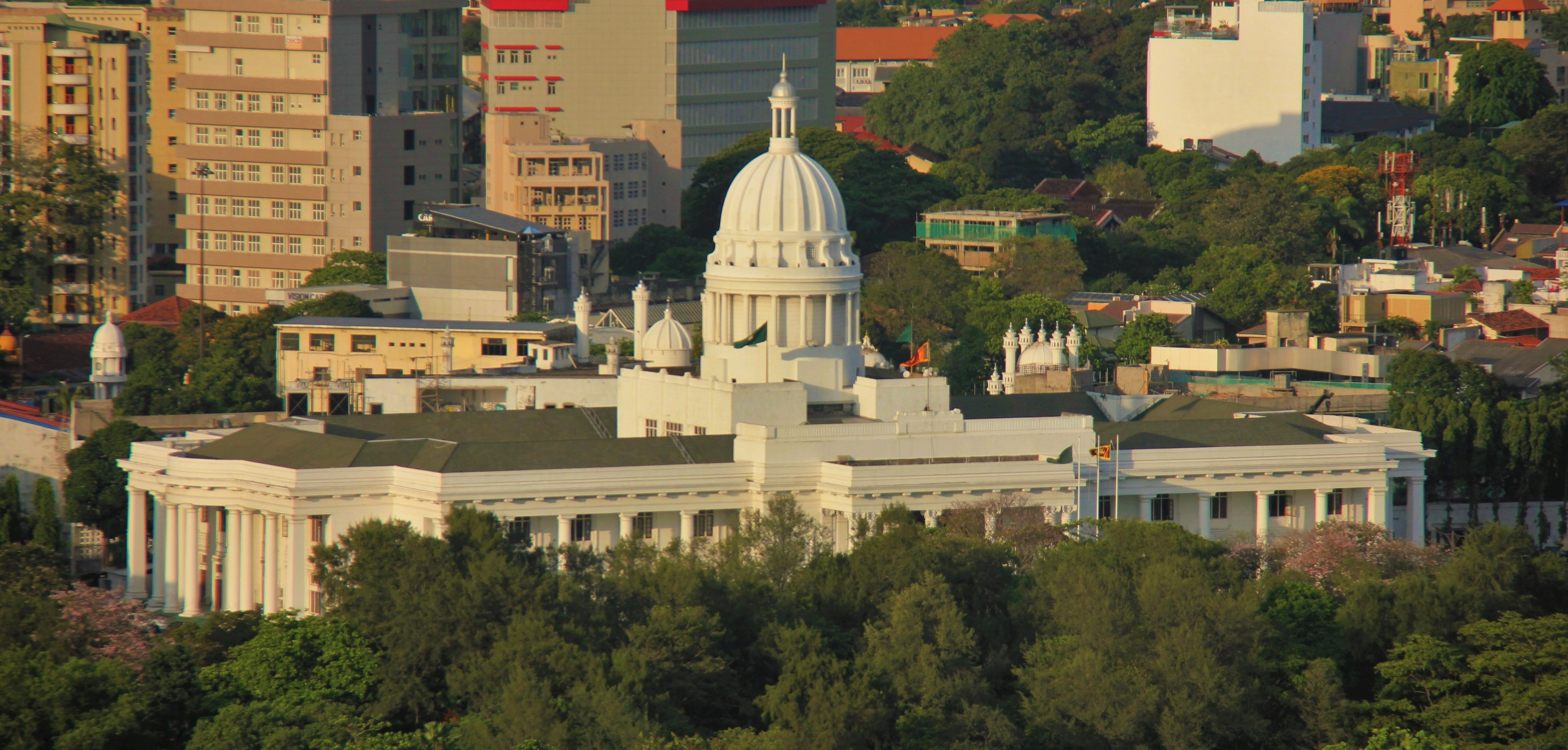

- Location within Greater Colombo

General information
- Architectural style: Neoclassical
- Location: Colombo, Sri Lanka
- Coordinates: 6°54′57.06″N 79°51′49.63″E
- Construction started: 24 May 1924
- Completed: 9 August 1928
- Client: Colombo Municipal Council

Height
- Height: 51.3 m (168 ft)

Design and construction
- Architect: S. J. Edwards
- Architecture firm: Ralph Booty & Co Ltd
- Main contractor: A. A. Gammon and Co

The Town Hall of Colombo (Sinhala: කොළඹ නගර ශාලාව, Tamil: நகர மண்டபம், கொழும்பு) is the headquarters of the Colombo Municipal Council and the office of the mayor of Colombo. Built in front of the Viharamahadevi Park, Colombo, Sri Lanka, it is the meeting place for the elected municipal council.

In 1921 renowned Scottish town planner Professor Patrick Geddes recommended that the Council should construct a large central and dignified municipal building to house the council, a public reception hall, the mayor's office and a public library. The need for the Colombo Public Library was addressed by a philanthropic donation of a building by Dr. W. Arthur Silva in 1925. This building, Sirinivasa, is now the official residence of the mayor.

In 1922 the Colombo Municipal Council held an international architectural design competition and in November that year of the 32 plans submitted, the winning design was drawn by S. J. Edwards, of the architectural firm Ralph Booty & Co. In awarding the prize the Government Architect of the Ceylon Public Works Department, Austin Woodeson, wrote:

"The buildings are admirably laid out on the site; the outbuildings are well secluded, but very accessible. The main building stands out prominently and would command pleasing views from all angles. The connecting roads are well laid out. The details and plans are excellently drawn, and illustrate in an artistic manner a most striking and effective design." "The connecting roads are well laid out. On the ground floor the corridors are straightforward, direct and well lighted. The general disposition of the departments and rooms is excellent and most convenient for access, circulation and inter-communicable both for the public and staff. On the upper floors, the offices are admirably arranged. The Council chamber is a magnificent apartment with ample accommodation for the public provided in an elevated gallery." "This provision gains many favourable points for this design. The elevations are very dignified and refined. The perspective view shows a very impressive group of buildings crowned by a dome and tower of fine proportions. The details and plans are excellently drawn, and illustrate in an artistic manner a most striking and effective design."

The foundation stone for the town hall was laid on 24 May 1924, by the Mayor of Colombo, Thomas Reid, CCS. The construction of the building was undertaken by A. A. Gammon & Co and four years later on 9 August 1928 it was formally opened by the Governor Sir Herbert Stanley KCMG. The cost of the new town hall was met largely by revenue generated by the Council, without taking out any loans from the central government and as a result, for years Municipal finances were depleted.

== Architectural design ==
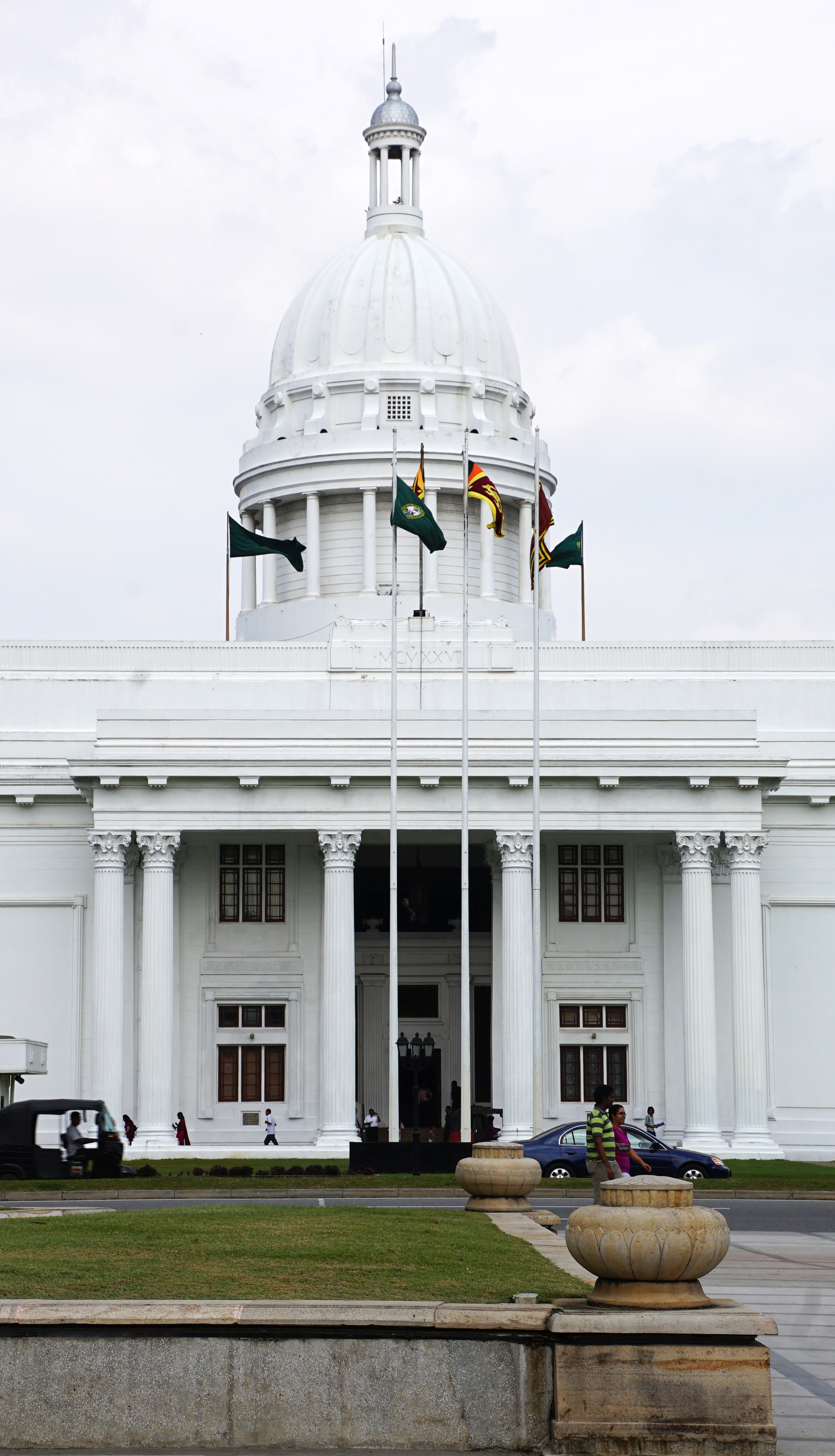
Dome and front porch

Edwards' design draws heavily from L'Enfant's neoclassical style Capitol Building in Washington, D. C.

The Council chamber is located in the centre of the block on the first floor surmounted by a dome. On either side and on the longitudinal axis is an open courtyard surrounded on each floor by the different departments of Council. The main entrance and staircase hall is situated at the centre of the front façade, facing directly onto Viharamahadevi Park, with the two staff entrances being at the two remote corners of the façade in the rear. There are six corinthian columns in the main porch, six on either side to the front and ten columns on either side of the building. The columns are each 11.6 m (38 ft) in height. The building is 108 m (354 ft) in length and 51.3 m (168 ft) in width and the total height of the building equals its width.

Although many alterations have been made to the original design, the building still possesses a few characteristics that have not been touched by modern renovations. The council chamber and its furniture, including the original lamps and lamp bases are still intact. All the doors and windows of the building are original, as well as the ornamental lamps on the staircase leading to the second floor from the lobby.

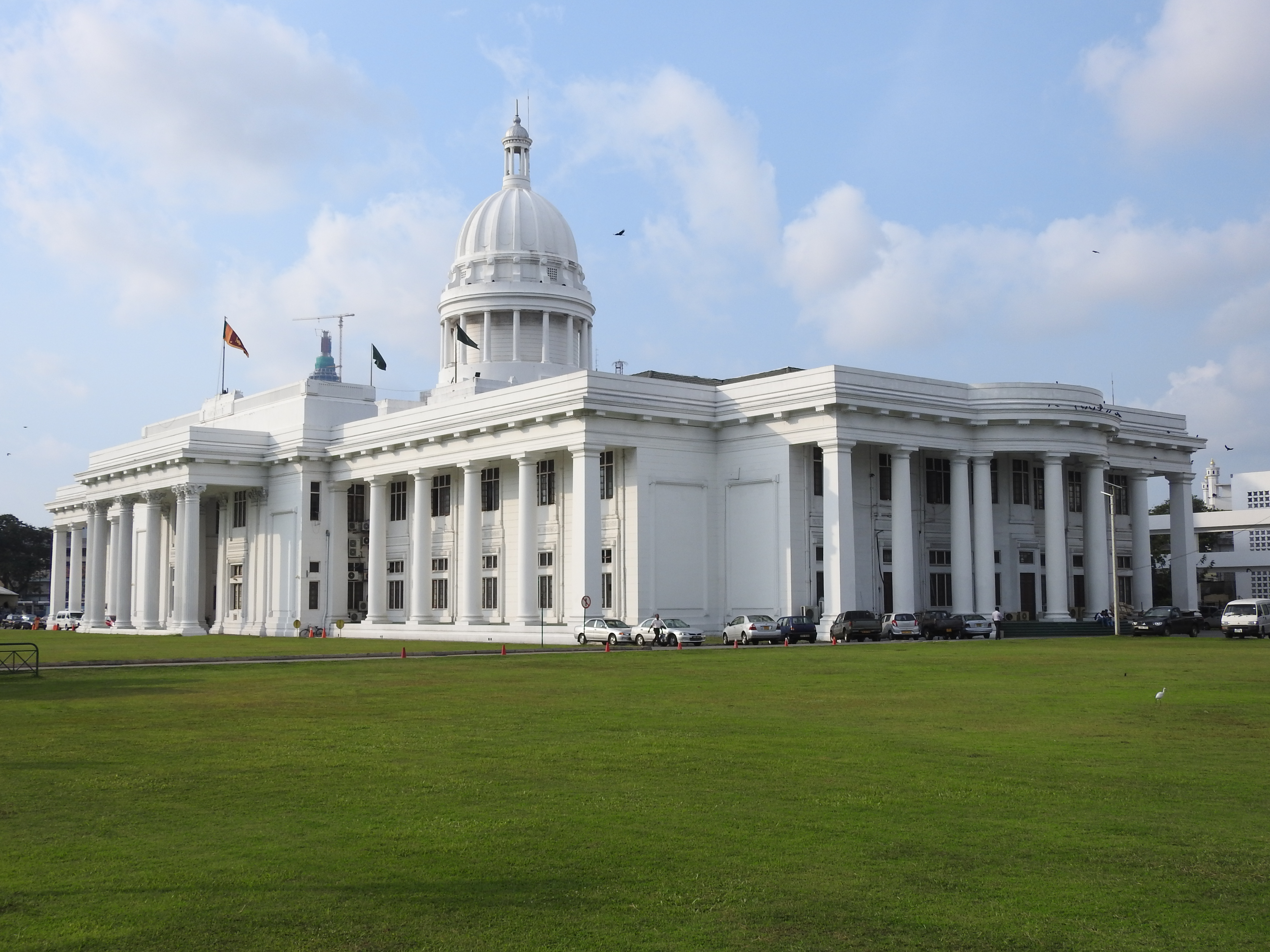
Town Hall, 2017

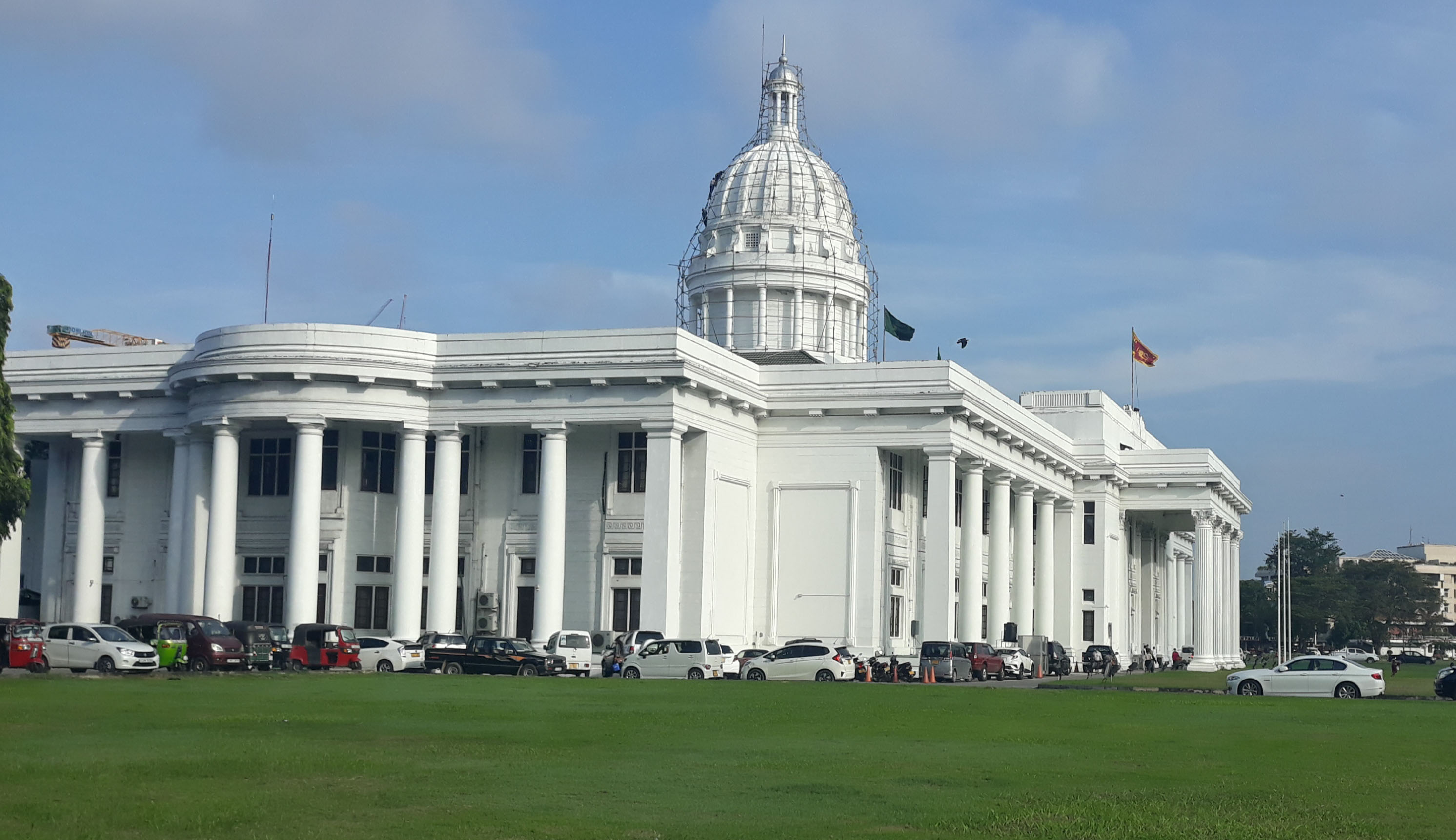
Town Hall,2021
