= Sirisena Cooray =

Sri Lankan politician (1931–2021)

Hon. Sirisena Cooray JP

Minister of Housing and Construction
- In office 1989–1994
- Preceded by: Ranasinghe Premadasa
- Succeeded by: Nimal Siripala de Silva

Member of Parliament for Colombo
- In office 1989–1994

Mayor of Colombo
- In office 1979–1989
- Preceded by: A. H. M. Fowzie
- Succeeded by: M. Hussain Mohamad

Personal details
- Born: 25 April 1931 Colombo, Ceylon
- Died: 30 November 2021 (aged 90) Colombo, Sri Lanka
- Party: United National Party

Bulathsinghalage Sirisena Cooray, JP (25 April 1931 – 30 November 2021) was a Sri Lankan politician.

== Biography ==
He was the Mayor of Colombo from 1979 to 1989 and was elected from Colombo to Parliament in the 9th parliamentary election in 1989. He was appointed Minister of Housing and Construction in the Premadasa cabinet. He had served as General Secretary of the United National Party during the tenure of party leader Ranasinghe Premadasa. He submitted nominations for the Colombo Municipal Council elections in 2006 as the Mayor, however his party nominations list was rejected by the election commission on a technicality. The independent party backed by Sirisena won the election and Uvais Mohamed Imitiyas became Mayor.

His brother Nandasena Cooray was a one time Deputy Mayor of Colombo and was married to the sister of the former JVP leader Somawansa Amarasinghe. Cooray died on 30 November 2021 at Colombo, aged 90 years.

== See also ==
- List of Sri Lankan non-career diplomats
