= Ratnasiri Rajapakse =

Hon. Ratnasiri Rajapakse MMC

Mayor of Colombo
- In office 1991–1996
- Preceded by: M. Hussain Mohamad
- Succeeded by: K. Ganeshalingam

Personal details
- Born: c.1946 Kaduwela, Ceylon
- Died: 12 September 2003 Colombo, Sri Lanka
- Party: United National Party

Ratnasiri Rajapakse (c.1946 – 12 September 2003) was a Sri Lanka politician, and the former Mayor of Colombo, between 1991 and 1996.

He was a member of the Western Provincial Council, a member of the United National Party Executive Committee and the General Secretary of the Sri Sucharitha movement, founded by President Ranasinghe Premadasa.

In May 1994 he was removed from the office of mayor on corruption charges and was replaced by the deputy mayor, Kanagasabai Ganeshalingam. His subsequent petition to the Court of Appeal was rejected and he followed this with an appeal to the Supreme Court, which ruled in 1997 that his removal was invalid, the order however came a month after the Colombo Municipal Council was dissolved.

He died on 12 September 2003, at the age of 57, following a heart attack.
