= V. A. Sugathadasa =

Sri Lankan politician

Vithana Arachchige Sugathadasa, OBE (7 July 1912 – 10 July 1973) was a Sri Lankan politician. He served as the first Minister of Sports and twice as the Mayor of Colombo.

== Early life ==
Born to a wealthy business family, he had two siblings. He was educated at St. Benedict's College, Colombo and Ananda College.

== Political career ==
=== Colombo Municipal Council ===
Sugathadasa entered politics having been elected to the Colombo Municipal Council as a municipal councillor from the Kochchikade ward as an independent candidate. He later joined the United National Party and was elected Deputy Mayor in 1949. On 6 March 1956 he was elected Mayor of Colombo, defeating Dr N. M. Perera. He held the post until 1 December 1957. He was again elected as Mayor of Colombo on 12 January 1960 and served until 10 January 1963.

=== Parliament ===
Sugathadasa first ran for the multi-member constituency of Colombo Central at the 1st parliamentary elections held in 1947. He polled seventh out of fifteen candidates, receiving 4,898 votes (4.8% of the total vote). He stood again for Colombo Central at the 3rd parliamentary election, held in April 1956, finishing in fifth place out of seven candidates, with 18,234 votes (12.3% of the total vote). He was successful at the 4th parliamentary election, held on 19 March 1960, where he was elected to parliament representing Colombo North, obtaining 9,446 (41.6% of the total vote) and unseating the sitting member, Vivienne Goonewardene. He was able to retain the seat at the July 1960 general election, increasing his majority to 50.1% of the total vote. He was subsequently re-elected at the 1965 parliamentary elections and the 1970 election. In 1966, he was appointed as the first Minister of Sports by Prime Minister Dudley Senanayake and served until 1970. He also served as Chairman of the National Olympic and Commonwealth Games Committee and was the President of the Ceylon Lawn Tennis Association from 1958 to 1968.

He died on 10 July 1973, at the age of 61, whilst still a sitting member of parliament. His position in parliament was filled by Vincent Perera, who successfully contested the by-election for the seat in September 1973.

== Honours ==
In 1955 he was made an Officer in the Order of the British Empire in the New Years Honours list.

The Sugathadasa Stadium, was named in his honour, having been built on land donated by Sugathadasa.
