= T. Rudra =

Thillainathan Rudra, JP, UM (1909–1960) was a Ceylonese politician. He was the mayor of Colombo from 1953 to 1954.

Rudra's father Thillainathan hailed from Vaddukkoddai and he grew up in Wellawatte. He became a champion weight lifter and gained the title of strong man of Colombo. He gained notability for his service during the Easter Sunday Raid. He became the manager of the Ananda Bhavan Vegetarian Restaurant. Rudra was elected to the Colombo Municipal Council from the Wellawatte Ward in 1946 and was elected Mayor of Colombo on 21 September 1953 and served till 13 August 1954. As Mayor he received Queen Elizabeth II during her Royal tour in 1954.
