= Park House, Colombo =

Official residence of the Municipal Commissioner of Colombo

Park House is the official residence of the Municipal Commissioner of Colombo. The 16-bedroom mansion is located on Albert Crescent, Cinnamon Gardens, Colombo, Sri Lanka. It was the official residence of the Mayor of Colombo until 1990 when the residence was shifted to Sirinivasa. Former Municipal Commissioner Badrani Jayawardena has been in residence since 2010, even after leaving the post in 2015.

The house was originally owned by Edmund Hewavitarne son of Don Carolis Hewavitharana

== See also ==
- Sirinivasa
