= Ferguson High School, Ratnapura =

Ferguson High School - Ratnapura
- ෆර්ගසන් උසස් විද්‍යාලය - රත්නපුර

Location
- Ratnapura 70000; Sri Lanka
- Coordinates: 6.6827135°N 80.3986365°E

Information
- Type: National School
- Motto: Live Pure : Speak True : Right Wrong
- Established: 1917 March 17; 109 years ago
- Principal: Mercy Galagama
- Teaching staff: 180
- Grades: 1–13
- Gender: Girls (Grade 1-13); Boys (Grade 1-5)
- Enrollment: 4,700
- Language: Sinhala, English, Tamil
- Colors: Dark green and silver
- Alumni: Fergusonites
- Website: www.fergusonhighschool.net

Ferguson High School (Sinhala: ෆර්ගසන් උසස් විද්‍යාලය) is a National School in Sri Lanka affiliated with the Sri Lanka Baptist Sangamaya located in Ratnapura District. School has two sections - the Primary section, which serves students from Grade 1 to Grade 5, and the Secondary section, which serves students from Grade 6 to Grade 13.

== History ==
1917 : Founded as a "Baptist Missionary English School" by the Baptist Missionary Society of British Ceylon. It was started with only three girls, in the premises of Baptist Church in Ratnapura.

1919 : The classroom was moved to the thatched-roofed spacious hall at the hilltop to accommodate the increasing number of 36 students.

1921 : The school was registered as a 'Grant-in-aid English School'

1924 : The school hostel was started.

1925 : Girl Guide Association was pioneered by C. Balasooriya.

1928 : The school known as Baptist Missionary English School was renamed as Ferguson High School in memory Mr. John Ferguson who helped the Baptist Missionary Society in Ceylon.

1932 : The system of school houses was introduced by the acting principal W. F. Gadge.

1933 : The Old Girls Association was initiated by Miss. Allsop.

1958 : School prize giving was held by the Chief guest Madam Sirimavo Bandaranayaka who was a former student of the school.

1960 : Became a Director Managed Government School and no longer a Christian assisted school

1993 : The school was recognized as a National school and 75th Birthday was celebrated with the participation of President Ranasinghe Premadasa

2010 : “Wisdom 2010” educational and Trade exhibition was held.

2017 : 100th anniversary of the school was celebrated with the participation President Maithripala Sirisena. A souvenir stamp was issued

== School Crest ==
Symbolic Representations

- Motto - Taken from "Idylls of the King" by Lord Tennyson
- Hills - 3 peaks seen from the school (Sri Padha and two attendant peaks)
- Double headed Eagle - High soaring free bird looking back with Thankfulness and looking forward with Hope
- CBC - Ceylon Baptist Council (Founders of School)
- Gems - School houses.
- Lamp - Intelligence
- Book - Knowledge

Drawn by Nalini Gunasekara, the art teacher of the school in 1953 and adopted unanimously

== School song ==
Written by Venetia Stemba, with music by Consy Jayasekara

== Houses ==
Students are divided into four houses.

Amethyst	Sincerity
Garnet	Fraternity
Ruby	Serenity
Sapphire	Purity

== Sports ==
- Athletics
- Chess
- Table Tennis
- Taekwondo
- Karate
- Swimming
- Netball
- Basketball
- Volleyball
- Cricket
- Badminton

== Clubs and extracurricular activities ==
- Girl Guide Association
- Science Association
- Drama club
- Media club
- Photography club
- Announcing club
- Chess club
- Astronomical Association

== Principals ==
Period	Name
1917-1922	J.D. Radley
1922 - 1949	Evelyn A. Allsop
1949 - 1960	F. Aurora Brook
1956 - 1971	Pearl Bright Perera
1972 - 1974	Malini Wijenayake
1974 - 1975	Mallika Thambiah
1976 - 1980	Pearl Bright Perera
1981 - 1982	Buddhi Bamunusinghe
1983 - 1986	S. Subasinghe
1987 - 1995	Buddhi Bamunusinghe
1995 - 1999	Malani Kothalawala
2000 - 2003	B. Rani Dariju
2003	U. V. Leelakanthi Nissanka
2004 - 2012	B. V. R. C. Bandarawatta
2012 to present	Mercy Galagama

== Notable alumni ==
Past pupils of Ferguson High School Ratnapura are called Fergusonites. Following is a list of some notable alumni:

Name	Notability
Sirimavo Bandaranayaka	Prime Minister of Sri Lanka (1960 - 1965, 1970 - 1977, 1994 - 2000) - world's first non-hereditary female head of government in modern history
Thalatha Atukorale	Politician, Member of Parliament of Sri Lanka
Rosy Senanayake	Politician, Mayor of Colombo, Mrs. World 1984
