= K. Ganeshalingam =

Hon. K. Ganeshalingam MMC

Mayor of Colombo
- In office June 1996 – March 1997
- Preceded by: Ratnasiri Rajapakse
- Succeeded by: Karu Jayasuriya

Personal details
- Born: 3 January 1938 Puloly, Ceylon
- Died: 4 December 2006 (aged 68)
- Party: United National Party
- Education: Hartley College; S. Thomas' College; University of Ceylon
- Profession: Accountant

Kanagasabai Ganeshalingam (3 January 1938 – 4 December 2006) was a Sri Lankan Tamil politician. He was Mayor of Colombo.

== Early life and family ==
Ganeshalingam was born on 3 January 1938 in Puloly in northern Ceylon. He was the son of Kanagasabai, a proctor, and Parvathipillai.

He was educated at the Hartley College and S. Thomas' College, Mount Lavinia. After school he joined the University of Ceylon where he was an elected officer of the student union.

Ganeshalingam married Yamuna, daughter of Dr. Sri Pathmanathan. They had a son (Kandeepan) and a daughter (Menaka). Ganeshalingam was a Hindu.

== Career ==
After university Ganeshalingam joined Ford Rhodes Thornton & Co as an accountancy student. He then entered business. He was director of the Tobacco Corporation and several other state organisations. He was also chairman of Ceylon Oxygen.

Ganeshalingam joined the United National Party (UNP) in 1960. He was appointed treasurer of the UNP in 1989. He was later elected to Colombo Municipal Council as a UNP candidate. He served as Deputy Mayor of Colombo between July 1991 and the end of 1993. He was acting Mayor of Colombo from January 1994 to June 1996 before serving as Mayor of Colombo between June 1996 and March 1997. He resigned from the UNP in January 1997. He then contested the 1997 election as a candidate of an independent group backed by the People's Alliance. He was re-elected to CMC and served as Leader of the Opposition from May 1997 to April 2002.

== Death ==
Ganeshalingam died in Colombo on 4 December 2006.
