= Sirinivasa =

General information
- Location: Sir Marcus Fernando Mawatha, Colombo, Sri Lanka
- Client: Mudaliyar Simon Fernando Sri Chandrasekera
- Owner: Colombo Municipal Council

Sirinivasa is the official residence of the Mayor of Colombo. It is located on Sir Marcus Fernando Mawatha (formerly Edinburgh Crescent), Cinnamon Gardens, Colombo, Sri Lanka.

The mansion was originally built by Mudaliyar Simon Fernando Sri Chandrasekera (1829–1908), who left his entire estate in trust to the Ceylon government. The building was used to house the Colombo Public Library from 1935 until a new building was constructed in 1990, adjoining Viharamahadevi Park (formerly Victoria Park). Following the transfer of the library the building was converted to become the official residence of the Mayor of Colombo.

== See also ==
- Temple Trees
- Park House, Colombo
