= Cyril E. S. Perera =

Ceylonese lawyer and teacher (1892–1968)

Hon. Cyril E. S. Perera

Colombo North
- In office 1952–1956
- Preceded by: George R. de Silva
- Succeeded by: Vivienne Goonewardena

Personal details
- Born: Cyril Ernest Stanley Perera; 19 January 1892 Ceylon
- Died: 27 March 1968 (aged 76) Sri Lanka
- Party: United National Party
- Spouse: Alice Farmacia
- Children: Ernest, Annesley
- Education: St. Anthony's College, Kandy; University of London
- Profession: Lawyer
- Ethnicity: Sinhalese

Cyril E. S. Perera, QC, (19 January 1892 – 27 March 1968) was a former member of the House of Representatives (Ceylon), and in later life a leading businessman.

== Biography ==
Cyril Ernest Stanley Perera was born on 19 January 1892 and received his secondary education at St. Anthony's College, Kandy. He obtained his Bachelor of Arts degree and first class honours Bachelor of Law degree from the University of London and was called to the bar at Gray's Inn. Perera had the unique distinction of being second in order of merit at the Bar Final in his year, and won a £50 prize from Gray's Inn.

Perera was a teacher before he entered the legal profession, and founded the first Teachers' Association of Ceylon, in Kandy, and was its Secretary until he left for Malaya in 1920, where he taught at the Anglo-Chinese School, Ipoh for five years. In Malaya he founded a Teachers' Association.

Perera began his legal practice in Kandy, and came to Colombo in 1935, and appeared frequently in the Appeal Courts, and the District Courts. In 1953 he was made a Queen's Counsel in recognition of his eminence at the Bar.

In 1952, Perera successfully contested the Colombo North seat in Parliament. Disillusioned he did not run again at the 1956 Parliamentary elections and returned to business and the law. Perera was a vocal critic of the S. W. R. D. Bandaranaike government's 'Sinhala Only Act' stating: "The Tamils will never forget and never forgive the majority community for depriving them of rights which had been apparently been secured to them."

In 1938 Perera, in association with Hugh Weerasekere, founded the Ceylon Insurance Company (predecessor to Ceylinco Consolidated) and was a member of its board until his death. He also floated the Finance Company of Ceylon (now called, The Finance Co. PLC), started the first Ceylonese shipping venture, the Eastern Star Lines, and was involved in establishing Ceylon Chocolates Limited in 1962, which produces the famous Kandos chocolates in Sri Lanka. He was one of the founder members of the Ceylon National Chamber of Industries and was its first chairman. At the time of his death, on 27 March 1968, he was either chairman or on the directorate of several Ceylonese organisations.

== Sources ==
http://islanka.com/index.php?itemID=173&branch=125
