= Minister of Parliamentary Affairs =

May mean:

- Ministry of Parliamentary Affairs (India)
- Ministry of Parliamentary Affairs (Sri Lanka)
