= C. T. Grero =

Ceylonese politician

C. T. Grero was a Ceylonese politician. He was mayor of Colombo from 1952 to 1953.

Elected to the Colombo Municipal Council from the Thimbirigasyaya Ward, he was to propose the name of the United National Party candidate for the post of Mayor, when the council gathered after the municipal election in 1952. The opposition in the council proposed Grero's name for Mayor and he was elected by a majority vote. This coined the term Doing a Grero.
