= Colombo North Electoral District =

Electoral district of Sri Lanka

Colombo North electoral district was an electoral district of Sri Lanka between August 1947 and February 1989. The district was named after the city of Colombo in Colombo District, Western Province. The 1978 Constitution of Sri Lanka introduced the proportional representation electoral system for electing members of Parliament. The existing 160 mainly single-member electoral districts were replaced with 22 multi-member electoral districts. Colombo North electoral district was replaced by the Colombo multi-member electoral district at the 1989 general elections, the first under the PR system, though Colombo North continues to be a polling division of the multi-member electoral district.

== Members of Parliament ==
Key

Independent LSSP UNP

Election	Member	Party	Term
1947	George R. de Silva	UNP	1947
1952	Cyril E. S. Perera	UNP	1952
1956	Vivienne Goonewardena	LSSP	1956
1960	V. A. Sugathadasa	UNP	1960 (March)
1960	V. A. Sugathadasa	UNP	1960 (July)
1965	V. A. Sugathadasa	UNP	1965
1970	V. A. Sugathadasa	UNP	1970
1973 (by-election)	M. Vincent Perera	UNP	1973 (by)
1977	M. Vincent Perera	UNP	1977

== Elections ==
=== 1947 Parliamentary General Election ===
Results of the 1st parliamentary election held between 23 August 1947 and 20 September 1947 for the district:

Candidate	Party	Symbol	Votes	%
George R. de Silva	United National Party	Umbrella	7,501	50.25
Lionel Cooray		Elephant	6,130	41.06
E. C. H. Fernando		Cup	501	3.36
A. P. de Zoysa	Independent	House	429	2.87
H. C. Abeywardena		Hand	178	1.19
Valid Votes			14,739	98.73
Rejected Votes			189	1.27
Total Polled			14,928	100.00
Registered Electors			30,791	
Turnout				48.48

=== 1952 Parliamentary General Election ===
Results of the 2nd parliamentary election held between 24 May 1952 and 30 May 1952 for the district:

Candidate	Party	Symbol	Votes	%
Cyril E. S. Perera	United National Party	Elephant	10,630	47.80
Leslie Goonewardena	Lanka Sama Samaja Party	Hand	7,136	32.09
George R. de Silva	Sri Lanka Freedom Party	Star	3,592	16.15
J. M. Gnanapragasam		Key	710	3.19
Valid Votes			22,068	99.22
Rejected Votes			173	0.78
Total Polled			22,241	100.00
Registered Electors			35,582	
Turnout				62.51

=== 1956 Parliamentary General Election ===
Results of the 3rd parliamentary election held between 5 April 1956 and 10 April 1956 for the district:

Candidate	Party	Symbol	Votes	%
Vivienne Goonewardena	Lanka Sama Samaja Party	Key	16,841	58.09
J. C. de Silva Wijeyeratne		Elephant	9,489	32.73
W. D. de Silva		Bicycle	1,305	4.50
M. W. Perera		Hand	1,229	4.24
Valid Votes			28,864	99.56
Rejected Votes			127	0.44
Total Polled			28,991	100.00
Registered Electors			43,388	
Turnout				66.82

=== 1960 (March) Parliamentary General Election ===
Results of the 4th parliamentary election held on 19 March 1960 for the district:

Candidate	Party	Symbol	Votes	%
V. A. Sugathadasa	United National Party	Elephant	9,446	41.64
Vivienne Goonewardena		Key	8,602	37.92
Vincent Siripala	Sri Lanka Freedom Party	Hand	3,149	13.88
A. M. G. de Silva		Umbrella	1,164	5.13
S. E. Nelson Fernando		Ladder	188	0.83
K. J. S. A. Fernando		Eye	52	0.23
Valid Votes			22,601	99.62
Rejected Votes			86	0.38
Total Polled			22,687	100.00
Registered Electors			29,434	
Turnout				77.08

=== 1960 (July) Parliamentary General Election ===
Results of the 5th parliamentary election held on 20 July 1960 for the district:

Candidate	Party	Symbol	Votes	%
V. A. Sugathadasa	United National Party	Elephant	11,507	50.11
Vivienne Goonewardena	Lanka Sama Samaja Party	Key	11,363	49.49
Valid Votes			22,870	99.60
Rejected Votes			92	0.40
Total Polled			22,962	100.00
Registered Electors			29,434	
Turnout				78.01

=== 1965 Parliamentary General Election ===
Results of the 6th parliamentary election held on 22 March 1965 for the district:

Candidate	Party	Symbol	Votes	%
V. A. Sugathadasa	United National Party	Elephant	19,875	62.01
Ananda Premasinghe		Key	11,884	37.08
M. D. C. S. Mendis		Omnibus	170	0.53
Valid Votes			31,929	99.63
Rejected Votes			120	0.37
Total Polled			32,049	100.00
Registered Electors			39,431	
Turnout				81.28

=== 1970 Parliamentary General Election ===
Results of the 7th parliamentary election held on 27 May 1970 for the district:

Candidate	Party	Symbol	Votes	%
V. A. Sugathadasa	United National Party	Elephant	20,930	59.68
Harris Wickremetunge		Chair	13,783	39.30
W. I. A. Corsby Fernando		Ship	164	0.47
A. S. Jayamaha		Cockerel	97	0.28
Valid Votes			34,974	99.72
Rejected Votes			97	0.28
Total Polled			35,071	100.00
Registered Electors			44,511	
Turnout				78.79

=== 1977 Parliamentary General Election ===
Results of the 8th parliamentary election held on 21 July 1977 for the district:

Candidate	Party	Symbol	Votes	%
Vincent Perera		Elephant	26,759	66.62
A. H. M. Fowzie		Hand	11,617	28.93
K. L. Robert Nandasiri Perera		Key	1,321	3.29
V. Dioynisius Wijesinghe		Bell	193	0.48
Don Sirisena Mallawarachi		Eye	49	0.12
E. D. Pemaratne		Lamp	45	0.11
G. T. Ariyadasa		Flower	42	0.10
Valid Votes			40,026	99.66
Rejected Votes			136	0.34
Total Polled			40,162	100.00
Registered Electors			49,803	
Turnout				80.64
