= Hubert Ernest Newnham =

Ceylonese civil servant and politician

Hubert Ernest Newnham CMG BA (Oxon) (1886–1970) was a Ceylonese civil servant and politician.

Hubert Ernest Newnham was born on 1 October 1886 in Southampton, the son of Henry Sullivan Newnham. He was educated at the Junior School of Monkton Combe School, at Dean Close School, Gloucestershire and St John's College, Oxford.

Newnham joined the Ceylon Civil Service in November 1909. He also served in the Ceylon Light Infantry obtaining the rank of Captain in 1918.

He was the Principal Collector of Customs and Chairman of the Colombo Port Commission. He also was the President of the Colonial Civil Servants’ Association.

Newnham served as the Chairman of the Colombo Municipal Council from August 1924 to July 1931.

In the 1937 Coronation Honours he was awarded with the Companion of the Order of St Michael and St George.

He retired from the Civil Service in 1939 and was subsequently appointed as a member of the 2nd State Council of Ceylon on 6 March 1939, resigning the position on 18 May 1943.

Newnham married Mary Garneys née Latter (1900-1979), they had two daughters - Elisabeth Margaret (b.1931) and Audrey Garneys (1934-2005).
