= Ferdinando Hamblyn Price =

Ferdinando Hamlyn Price

9th Mayor of Colombo
- In office May 1895 – March 1901
- Preceded by: Charles Edward Ducat Pennycuick
- Succeeded by: Arthur Sampson Pagden

Personal details
- Born: 25 May 1855 Langley Marish, Berkshire, England
- Died: 10 February 1942 (aged 86) Brighton, Sussex, England
- Spouse: Geraldine Rose Flower (m. 1901)
- Parent(s): Charles Godfrey Price, Elizabeth née Casson
- Profession: Colonial civil servant

Ferdinando Hamlyn Price (25 May 1855 – 10 February 1942) was a British civil servant in Ceylon. He served as the Mayor of Colombo from May 1895 through to March 1901.

Ferdinando Hamlyn Price was born on 25 May 1855 at Langley Marish in Buckinghamshire (now Berkshire) in England, the son of Charles Godfrey Price (1821–1882), a legal barrister, and Elizabeth née Casson (1820–?).

Price was educated at Rossall School, Lancashire, where in his final year he was the captain of the school. In 1875 he completed his studies at Queens' College, Cambridge. He entered the Ceylon Civil Service in March 1878, serving at the Colombo Kachcheri. In 1879 he was transferred to the Police Court at Ratnapura. The next year he was appointed the Police Magistrate at Point Pedro before becoming acting Assistant Collector of Customs at Trincomalee in May 1880.

In May 1895 he was elected as Mayor of Colombo, during his tenure he oversaw the introduction of electricity, initially to Colombo fort. He also opened, on 12 September 1899, the first electric tramway in Colombo, running from the Grand Oriental Hotel to Grand Pass.

In October 1901 he was appointed as government agent of Uva Province, in 1905 the assistant government agent of Trincomalee and subsequently the government agent of Northern Province.

On 12 July 1901 he married Geraldine Rose Flower (1867–1940), daughter of Sir William Henry Flower, in Chelsea, London.

British author, Leonard Woolf, described Price as "tall, thin, athletic looking, baldish, with a long hatchet-face, an impassive, unflinching, implacable eye, an air of natural unshakable superiority and of good-humoured tolerance of so many obviously inferior (but well-meaning, so far as they go) persons. He was a terrific snob and was – or believed himself to be – a Welsh landowner and gentleman – and he believed that practically no one else …. was a gentleman." in his book, Growing - Seven Years in Ceylon, published in 1961.

On 26 November 1915 he passed the bar at Lincoln's Inn and became a barrister.

Price died on 10 February 1942, at the age of 86 in Ewell, Surrey, England. As he had no offspring he left his estate to his sister-in-law, Augusta Prideaux née Flower.
