= Sri Lanka Baptist Sangamaya =

Protestant Christian denomination

Sri Lanka Baptist Church
- ශ්‍රි ලංකා බැප්ටිස්ට් සභාව
- Classification: Protestant ( Baptist)
- Associations: Asia Pacific Baptist Federation, [[Baptist World Alliance, World Council of Children
- Language: English, Sinhala & Tamil
- Headquarters: No 46, Kynsey Road Colombo, Sri Lanka
- Territory: Sri Lanka
- Origin: 1812
- Congregations: 45
- Members: 6,674
- Secondary schools: Carey College, Colombo; Ferguson High School, Ratnapura
- Official website: http://www.baptistchurch.lk/

The Sri Lanka Baptist Church ( sinhala - ශ්‍රි ලංකා බැප්ටිස්ට් සභාව Sri Lanka Baptist sabhawa) ( Tamil -) is a Protestant Christian denomination in Sri Lanka. Established on 16 April 1812. It is affiliated with the Baptist World Alliance. The headquarters is in Colombo. It is a member of the Christian Conference of Asia, National Christian Council of Sri Lanka and World Council of Churches through NCC.

== History ==
The Baptist denomination in Sri Lanka began in 1812, with the arrival of Rev. James Charter a missionary from the Baptist Missionary Society of the United Kingdom, a colleague of the legendary pioneer of the Modern Missionary movement Rev. William Carey. During early days church planting & evangelism of Ceylonese was done by the missionaries of Baptist Missionary Society with its headquarters in Britain. The first Baptist church was established in Grandpass Colombo and expanded to other areas of the Western, North Western, and Central regions of the island. The missionaries began establishing schools in the regions where they had already planted churches. These schools were also used for worship and other evangelical programs.

In 1887 Sri Lanka Baptist Mission was founded and worked alongside the Baptist Missionary Society of Great Britain. In 1894 the Ceylon Baptist Union was formed. In 1924 the Baptist Missionary Society took a decision to gradually withdraw financial support and personnel from Sri Lanka. This marked the movement by which local leadership began to assert itself and the Baptist community became self-supporting and took on a more truly Sri Lankan image. This gave birth to the Ceylon Baptist Union representing the local Baptist congregations. In 1944 the Lanka Baptist Mission and Ceylon Baptist Union were amalgamated to form the Ceylon Baptist Council. In 1957, soon after the social transition that was set in motion and a swing towards emphasis on the national languages the name was changed to Sri Lanka Baptist Sangamaya a literal translation of Ceylon Baptist Council to Sinhala in keeping with national trends in the country by an act of parliament. In 2012 Sri Lanka Baptist Sangamaya celebrated its 200th anniversary since its beginnings in 1812.

According to a census published by the association in 2023, it claimed 6,674 members and 45 churches.

== Departments ==
Sri Lanka Baptist Church includes four main departments also identified as auxiliaries:

- Baptist Men’s Fellowship
- Baptist Women's League
- Baptist young people’s auxiliary https://www.facebook.com/share/16xtPTgJCt/?mibextid=wwXIfr

== Schools ==
The Ceylon Baptist church established many secondary and primary schools in all parts of the island from its inception. The schools were established by the Baptist Missionary Society (BMS) and were mainly under the care of the foreign missionaries and several secular foreign men and women along with the local Christian community. The Baptists established the schools to uplift the education and living standards of the Ceylonese and to spread the Gospel. By the year 1910, the Ceylon Baptist Church had 30 schools with a student population of 2,561. The education process is carried out in English and also in native languages. Baptist education has produced many notable distinguished personalities like Rosy Senanayake and Sirimavo Bandaranaike who received her primary education from Ferguson high school Ratnapura.

1. Carey College, Colombo.

2. Ferguson High School, Ratnapura.

3. Baptist Girls' High School, Colombo.

4. Baptist Missionary School (BMS), Matale.

5. Baptist mixed school, Kadawatha.

In the 1960s most private schools were handed over to the government to establish a non-fee levying education system. Baptist schools were also handed over to the government and names of the some institutions were altered later.

== Social services ==
Ampegama Baptist Village in the district of Galle was built by Sri Lanka Baptist Sangamaya to accommodate the victims of the Tsunami that struck in 2004. The village is completed and also consists of a student Library, A community center, A preschool, and a self-employment project in operation.

The church manages two elders' homes, one in Hendala and the other in Kotikawatha providing love and care to the senior citizens.

== Fellowship ==
Sri Lanka Baptist Sangamaya is in fellowship with other denominations in Sri Lanka through the National Christian Council (NCC), while being a member of the Baptist World Alliance, which represents the World Community of Baptist. It is also affiliated to Asian Region of Baptists represented by the Asian Baptist Federation. Sri Lanka Baptist Sangamaya's membership in the Christian Conference of Asia and the World Council of Churches (through NCC) links it with the Christian churches in the East and churches affiliated to the World Council of Christians.
