= Victoria Park, Nuwara Eliya =

Park in Nuwara Eliya, Sri Lanka

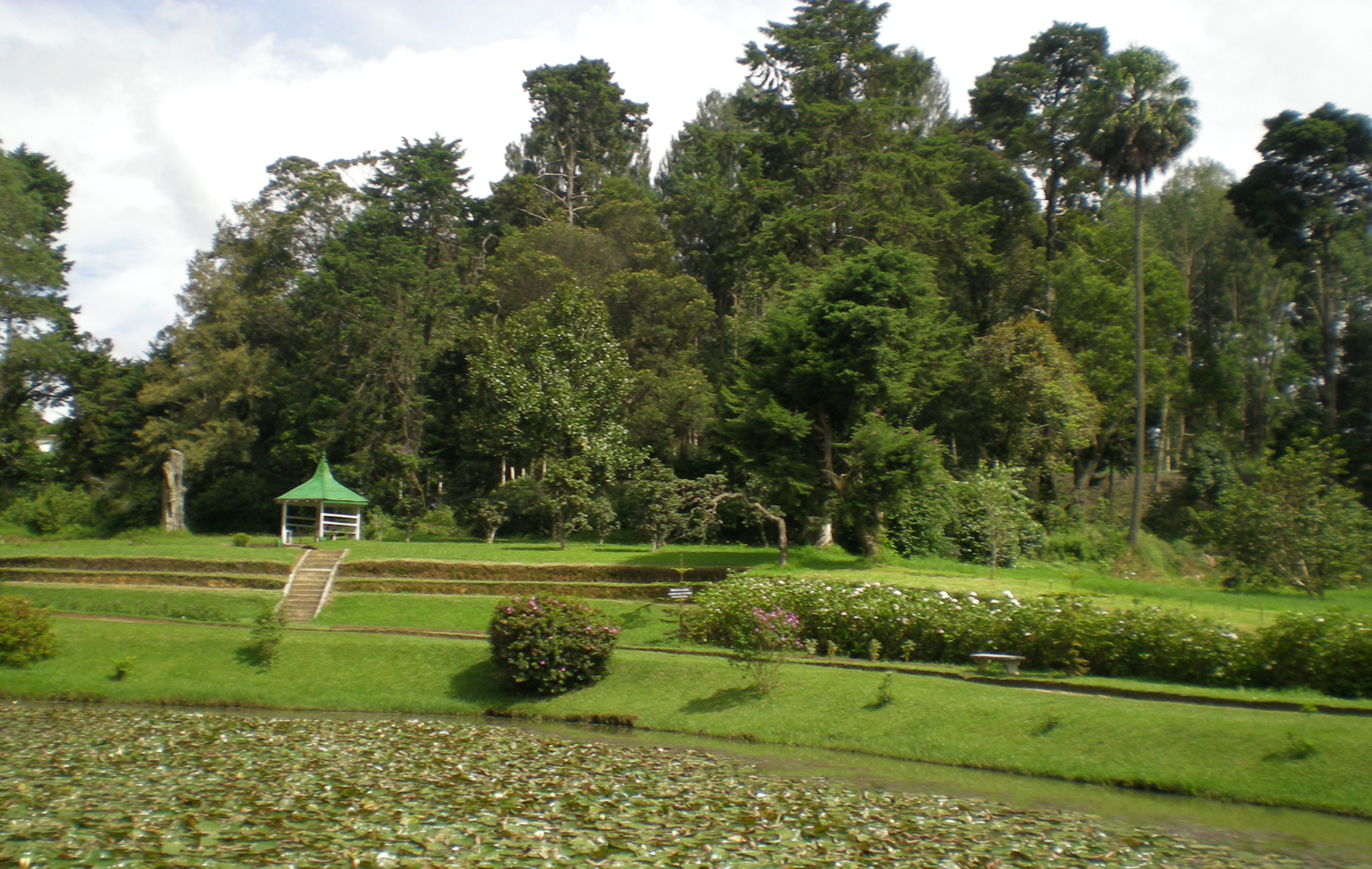
- Interactive map of Victoria Park, Nuwara Eliya
- Type: Urban park
- Location: Nuwara Eliya, Sri Lanka
- Coordinates: 6°58′9″N 80°46′05″E
- Area: 11 ha (27 acres)
- Operator: Nuwara Eliya Municipal Council
- Visitors: 100,000 (local), 4000 – 5000 (foreign)
- Status: Open all year

Victoria Park is a public park located in Nuwara Eliya, next to the Nuwara Eliya Post Office in Sri Lanka.

Originally the park was the research field of Hakgala Botanical Garden. The park was formally named in 1897 to commemorate the Diamond Jubilee of Queen Victoria. The park was established with the planting of its first tree, an Oak, by a visiting German Princess. The Nanu Oya runs through the park, creating a number of small lakes. A number of rare bird species can be found in the park. At the far end of the park is a small children's playground and miniature ridable railway.

== See also ==
- Victoria Park, Colombo
