= Viharamahadevi Park =

Public park in Colombo, Sri Lanka

Coordinates: 6°54′50″N 79°51′38″E

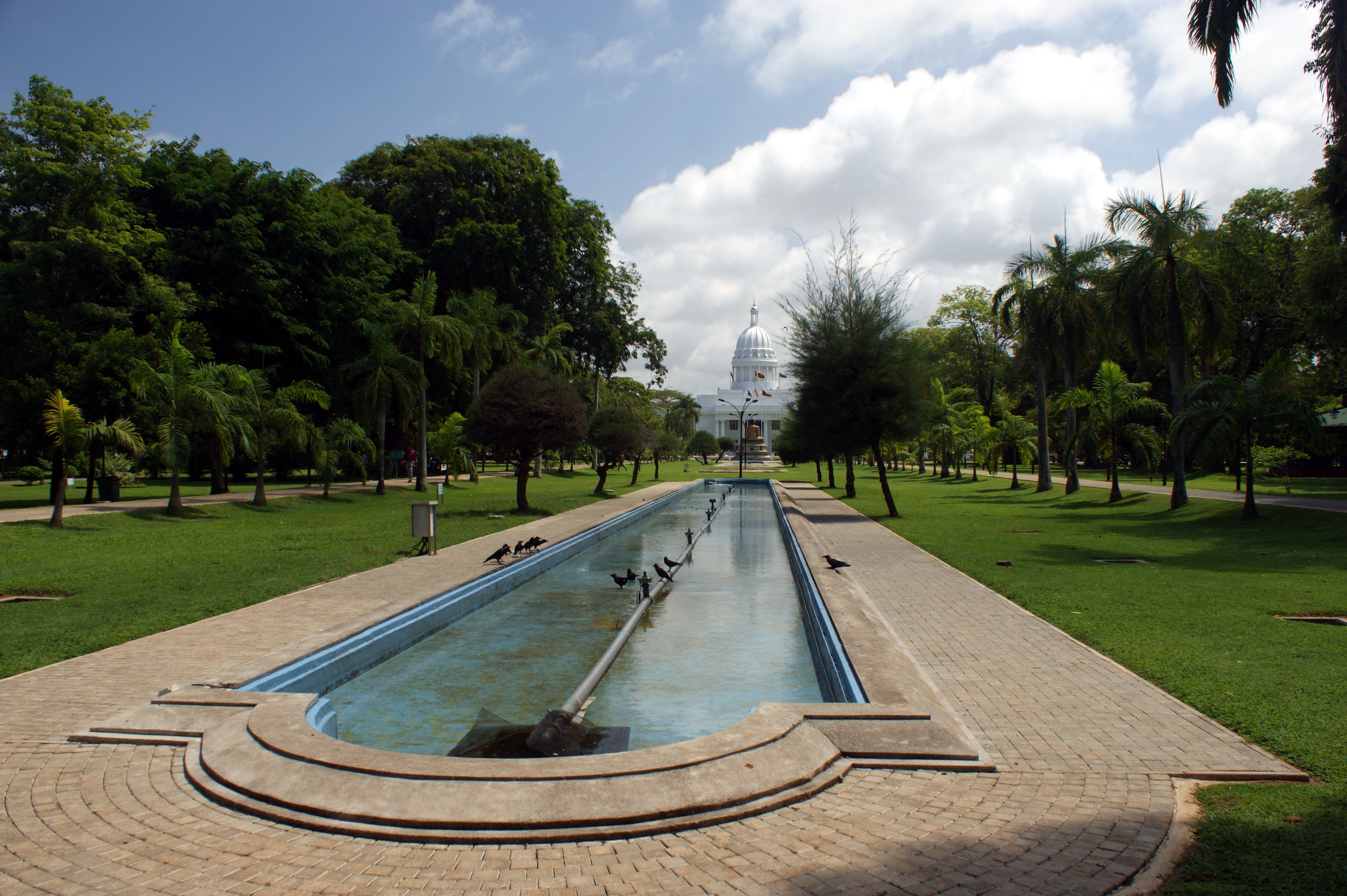
- Interactive map of Viharamahadevi Park
- Type: Urban park
- Location: Colombo in Sri Lanka
- Operator: Colombo Municipal Council
- Status: Open all year

Viharamahadevi Park (Sinhala: විහාරමහාදේවී උද්‍යානය; formerly Victoria Park, Sinhala: වික්ටෝරියා පාක්) is a 45 acre public park located in Cinnamon Gardens, in Colombo, situated in front of the colonial-era Town Hall in Sri Lanka. It was built by the British colonial administration and is the oldest and largest park of Colombo. The park was originally named "Victoria Park" after Queen Victoria but was renamed after Queen Viharamahadevi, the mother of King Dutugamunu on July 18, 1958.

During World War II it was occupied by the British Army with Australian 17th Brigade based at Victoria Park. After the war the park was restored and open to the public in 1951.

There used to be a cricket ground in the park, which was used for first-class cricket between 1927 and 1995. Ceylon played against a touring English team there in 1927 and against an Australian team in 1935.

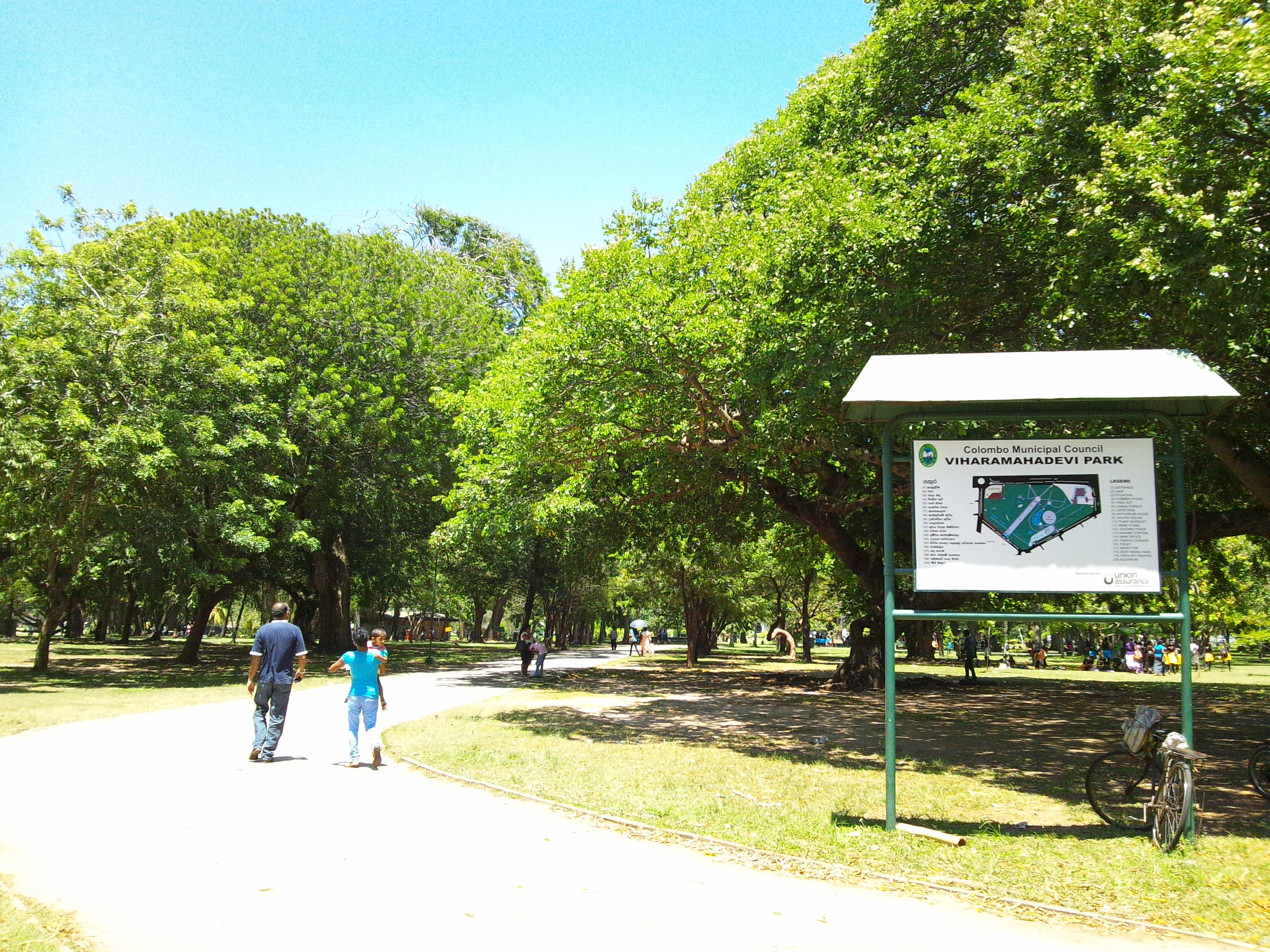
Viharamahadevi Park

The park features include a huge Buddha statue which replaced the statue of Queen Victoria which originally stood there, and a series of water fountains. It also includes a mini zoo, a children's play area and a BAC Jet Provost. There are Muscovy ducks in the park. They swim in the artificial lake and walk on the grass beside it.

Viharamahadevi Park is the only large-scale public park in Colombo, and is maintained by the Colombo Municipal Council. Located at its western end is the Cenotaph War Memorial, Colombo and the Colombo Public Library. The Vihara Maha Devi Park Open Air Stadium is a venue for concerts and public events.

== See also ==
- Victoria Park, Nuwara Eliya
- Jubilee Post, Nugegoda

== Maps ==
- Map location of Viharamahadevi Park
