= Ministry of Sports and Youth Affairs (Sri Lanka) =

Government ministry of Sri Lanka

Ministry of Youth Affairs and Sports
- තරුණ කටයුතු හා ක්‍රීඩා අමාත්‍යාංශය இளைஞர் மற்றும் விளையாட்டுத்துறை அமைச்சு

Ministry overview
- Formed: 1966
- Jurisdiction: Government of Sri Lanka
- Minister responsible: Sunil Kumara Gamage, Minister of Youth Affairs and Sports
- Website: www.moys.gov.lk

Minister of Youth Affairs and Sports of Sri Lanka
- Incumbent; Sunil Kumara Gamage since 18 November 2024
- Ministry of Youth Affairs and Sports
- Appointer: The president on advice of the prime minister
- Website: www.moys.gov.lk

The Ministry of Youth Affairs and Sports (Sinhala: තරුණ කටයුතු හා ක්‍රීඩා අමාත්‍යාංශය; Tamil: இளைஞர் மற்றும் விளையாட்டுத்துறை அமைச்சு) is a ministry in the Government of Sri Lanka which has the mandate to promote the role of sports in Sri Lankan culture and society. As of end September 2025, Sunil Kumara Gamage is the Minister of Sports and Youth Affairs, an appointment to the Cabinet of Sri Lanka. He was named as minister in November 2024.

== History ==
The ministry was initially created in 1966 to help bring the varied sports initiatives together as part of the portfolio of the Ministry of Nationalised Services. The first Minister was V. A. Sugathadasa, the first Secretary was Dr. H. S. R. Gunawardena and the first Director was Austin Rajakaruna. In 1970 the Ministry of Parliamentary Affairs and Sports was established. In 1989 this entity was renamed the Ministry of Youth Affairs and Sports and subsequently in 2000 as the Ministry of Tourism and Sports. In 2004 it was called the Ministry of Sports and Youth Affairs, in 2007 the Ministry of Sports and Public Recreation of Sports and finally in 2010 the Ministry of Sports.

As of 2022 it is called the Ministry of Sports and Youth Affairs.

== List of ministers ==
Parties

Sri Lanka Freedom Party United National Party Sri Lanka Podujana Peramuna

Name	Portrait	Party	Tenure
V. A. Sugathadasa		United National Party	1966 - 1970
Kiri Banda Ratnayake		Sri Lanka Freedom Party	1972 - 1977
Vincent Perera		United National Party	1977 - 1988
Nanda Mathew		United National Party	1989 - 1993
S. B. Dissanayake	S. B. Dissanayake	Sri Lanka Freedom Party	1994 - 2001
Mangala Samaraweera	Mangala Samaraweera	Sri Lanka Freedom Party	2001
Lakshman Kiriella		United National Party	2001 - 2002
Johnston Fernando	Johnston Fernando	United National Party	2002 - 8 April 2004
Jeewan Kumaranatunga		Sri Lanka Freedom Party	8 April 2004 - 28 January 2007
Gamini Lokuge	Gamini Lokuge	United National Party (D)	28 January 2007 - 23 April 2010
C. B. Rathnayake		Sri Lanka Freedom Party	23 April 2010 - 22 November 2010
Mahindananda Aluthgamage		Sri Lanka Freedom Party	22 November 2010 – 12 January 2015
Navin Dissanayake		United National Party	19 January 2015 - 4 September 2015
Dayasiri Jayasekara		Sri Lanka Freedom Party	4 September 2015 - 12 April 2018
Faiszer Musthapha		Sri Lanka Freedom Party	12 April 2018 - 15 December 2018
Harin Fernando	S. B. Dissanayake	United National Party	20 December 2018 - 15 November 2019
Dullas Alahapperuma		Sri Lanka Podujana Peramuna	22 November 2019 – 12 August 2020
Namal Rajapaksa		Sri Lanka Podujana Peramuna	12 August 2020 – 3 April 2022
Roshan Ranasinghe		Sri Lanka Podujana Peramuna	23 May 2022 – 27 November 2023
Harin Fernando	S. B. Dissanayake	Samagi Jana Balawegaya	27 November 2023 - 2024
