= Akuressa suicide bombing =

2009 bombing in Sri Lanka

- Location: Akuressa, Sri Lanka
- Date: March 10, 2009
- Attack type: Suicide bombing
- Deaths: 14
- Injuries: 35
- Perpetrator: Liberation Tigers of Tamil Eelam

On 10 March 2009, a Liberation Tigers of Tamil Eelam suicide bomber caused an explosion at a religious parade near Godapitiya Jumma mosque in Akuressa, Matara in southern Sri Lanka, killing 14 and injuring 35 civilians. Several government ministers were among the injured including oil resource minister A. H. M. Fowzie, telecommunication minister Mahinda Wijesekara, Mahinda Yapa Abeywardena, Pandu Bandaranaike, Chandrasiri Gajadeera, and Ali Ameer. Also, there were few local politicians among the dead.

As a result of the police investigations on the incident, the LTTE suicide bomber was identified as Senthamil by his girlfriend at the Matara Hospital mortuary.

The explosion was caught on a video footage filmed by a local resident.
