= Wimal Wickremasinghe =

Sri Lankan politician and economist

Member of Parliament for Ratnapura
- In office 9 March 1989 – 24 June 1994
- Majority: 50.71%

Minister of Environment & Parliamentary Affairs
- In office 7 April 1993 – 16 August 1994
- President: Ranasinghe Premadasa; Dingiri Banda Wijetunga
- Preceded by: Office established
- Succeeded by: Ratnasiri Wickremanayake

Chief Government Whip
- In office 7 April 1993 – 24 June 1994
- President: Ranasinghe Premadasa
- Preceded by: Vincent Perera
- Succeeded by: Richard Pathirana

Personal details
- Born: 25 November 1942
- Died: 9 January 2009 (aged 66)
- Party: United National
- Spouse: Daya Menike
- Children: 2
- Profession: Economist

Dr Govinnage Wimal Padmasiri Wickremasinghe (25 November 1942 – January 2009) was a Sri Lankan politician and economist. A member of the Sri Lankan parliament for Ratnapura District, he served as the Minister of Environment and Parliamentary Affairs in the United National Party government headed by Sri Lankan president R. Premadasa. He also functioned as the Chief Government Whip of Sri Lankan parliament from 7 April 1993 to 24 June 1994.

An economist by profession, Wickremasinghe served as the director of research in the Central Bank of Sri Lanka. He also served as the Chairman of the Sri Lanka Export Credit Insurance Corporation which he initiated and introduced the practical concept of credit insurance to Sri Lanka. Wickremasinghe once served as the Chairman of the International Committee of Export Credit Insurance of the developing countries. He also served as a World Bank consultant to the Government of Indonesia.

Wickremasinghe was the author of several books which he wrote after retiring from active politics. He married Daya Menike, a senior professor in the Department of Linguistics, University of Kelaniya, they had two children, Shresta (son) and Mauli (daughter), whom both reside in USA.
