= Simon Fernando Sri Chandrasekera =

Businessman in Sri Lanka

Mudaliyar Simon Fernando Sri Chandrasekera (1829–1908) was a prominent businessman during the late 19th century in Sri Lanka.

Born Singho Appu Baasunnahe in the village of Horetuduwa in Moratuwa. He started life making tea chests and moved into other businesses. He built Sirinivasa which was gifted by him to the city of Colombo and is the current official residence of the Mayor of Colombo. His daughter married Dr W. A. de Silva. His other relations included Sir Susantha de Fonseka, Cissy Cooray and H. W. Amarasuriya. who left his entire estate in trust to the Ceylon government.
