= Vraîe Cally Balthazaar =

Sri Lankan politician (born 1985)

Her Worship Vraîe Cally Balthazaar
- ව්‍රායි කැලී බල්තසාර් விராய் கேலி பல்தசார்

Mayor of Colombo
- Incumbent
- Assumed office 16 June 2025
- Deputy: Hemantha Kumara
- Preceded by: Rosy Senanayake

Personal details
- Born: 9 April 1985 (age 41) Colombo, Sri Lanka
- Party: National People's Power
- Education: Methodist College, Colombo; Northumbria University (B.A.); University of Colombo (M.A.)

Vraîe Cally Balthazaar (born 9 April 1985) is a Sri Lankan politician, media personality, activist and researcher serving as Mayor of Colombo since 16 June 2025. She is a member of the National People's Power and is the second woman to hold the office, after Rosy Senanayake.

== Early life and education ==
Balthazaar was born in 1985 and completed her primary and secondary schooling at Methodist College, Colombo. She earned a bachelor's degree in fashion/apparel design from Northumbria University in 2010. She then received a postgraduate diploma and a Master's degree in Gender and Women's Studies from the University of Colombo in 2020.

== Career ==
From 2005 to 2014, Balthazaar spent nearly a decade as a television presenter, notably hosting Good Morning Sri Lanka on MTV. Following 2018, she became actively involved in NGOs and research projects focused on women's and children's rights. As a researcher in urban development, her work examined the impact of city planning on low-income communities. She also championed gender equality and labour rights.

In 2018, she founded Cally Products, a company creating biodegradable alternatives to single-use polythene and other non-biodegradable products in Sri Lanka.

=== Politics ===
In 2021, Balthazaar joined the Socialist Youth Union, affiliated with the Janatha Vimukthi Peramuna, which is allied with the NPP.

She ran as an NPP candidate during the 2024 parliamentary elections in Colombo District. She secured 44,633 preferential votes and finished 18th among the party's candidates.

In the local government elections held on 6 May 2025, Balthazaar contested the Thimbirigasyaya ward of the Colombo Municipal Council and was elected with 2,094 votes. Her party, the NPP, won 48 of the 119 council seats, becoming the largest single group.

== Mayor of Colombo (2025-present) ==
Balthazaar announced her candidacy for mayor on 9 March 2025. She campaigned on clean governance, anti-corruption measures, urban reform, improving waste management, and affordable housing.

On 16 June 2025, during the Colombo Municipal Council's inaugural session, Balthazaar was elected mayor via secret ballot. While a mayor is typically nominated by the city's majority party, the May elections yielded no party a majority of the votes. Therefore, Balthazaar was nominated by the National People's Power, while Riza Zarook was nominated by the Samagi Jana Balawegaya. She received 61 votes, defeating Zarook, who received 54 votes (with two ballots rejected).

She is the second woman to hold the position, after her predecessor Rosy Senanayake (2018–2023), and leads Colombo under the NPP-JVP alliance, marking the city's first left-wing governance since N.M. Perera (1954–1956).

Political offices
Preceded by Rosy Senanayake	Mayor of Colombo; June 2025–present	Incumbent
