= Colombo Public Library =

Public library in Sri Lanka

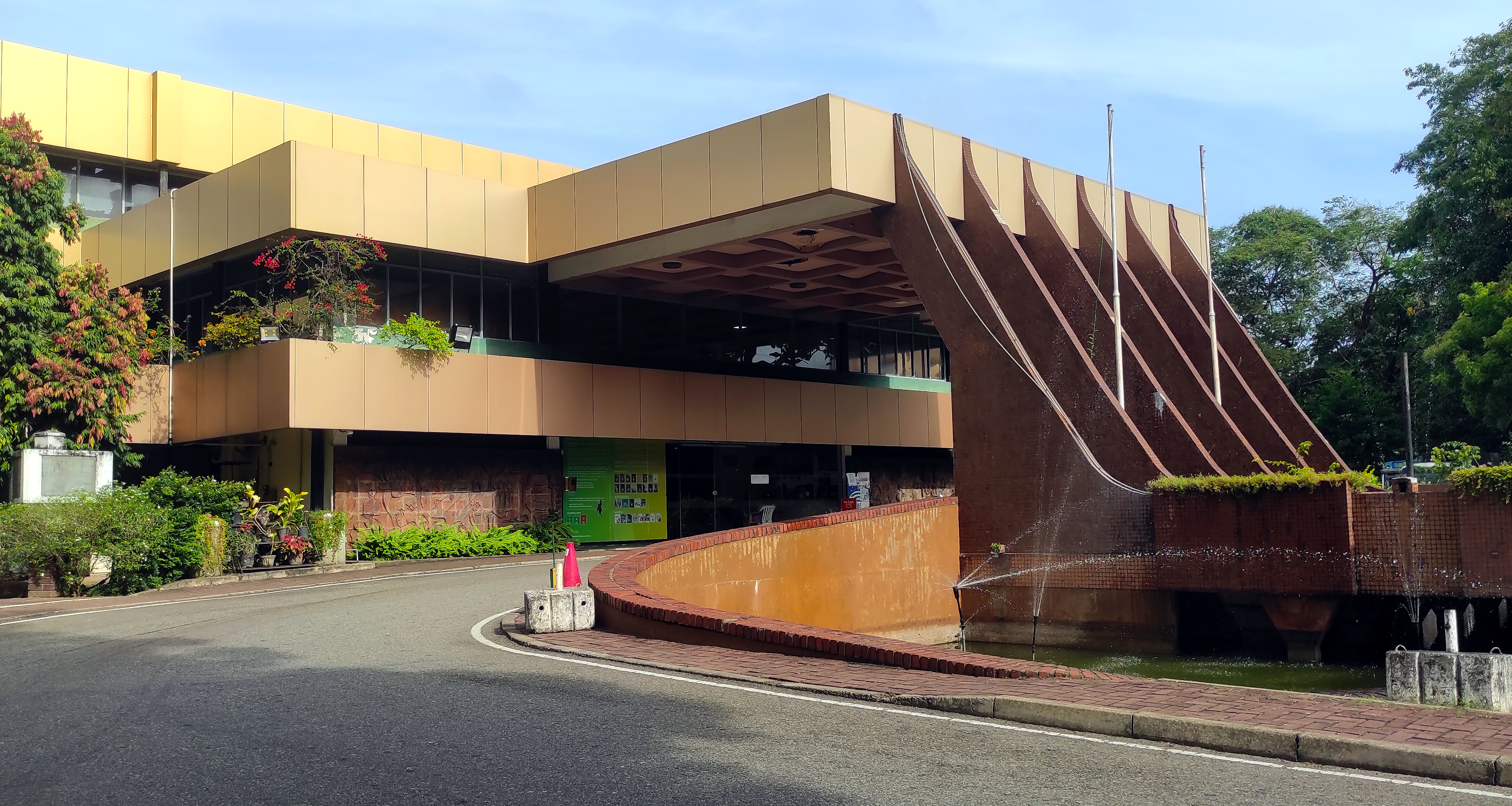
- Colombo Public Library main entrance
- 6.912784759371049°N 79.85926055486318°E
- Location: 15, Sir Marcus Fernando Mawatha, Colombo 7, Sri Lanka
- Type: Public library
- Established: 10 August 1925; 101 years ago
- Branches: 13

Collection
- Size: ~ 1 million Books, 57 Newspapers & 111 periodical titles

Access and use
- Members: 2 million (2019)

Other information
- Budget: ▲ Rs 50 million (2020)
- Director: Waruni Gagabadaarachchi
- Employees: 52 (2020)
- Parent organization: Colombo Municipal Council
- Website: www.colombo.mc.gov.lk/public-library.php

Colombo Public Library is the largest public library in Sri Lanka, located in Colombo 07, Sri Lanka.

== History ==
The first public library in the country was the United Service Library, which was established in 1813. It was used exclusively by civil and military officers of the Government stationed in Colombo and was housed in a building opposite the Queen's House, on Janadhipathi Mawatha (formerly Kings Street). In 1829, the Burghers opened the 'Colombo Pettah Library' in Pettah. On 1 October 1924, E. W. Jayawardena moved a resolution at the Colombo Municipal Council to establish the Colombo Library. The Colonial Secretary, Sir Cecil Clementi, called a meeting of subscribers of both libraries, and they agreed to hand over their books to the new library, which was to be run as a department of the Colombo Council.

The Colombo Library was opened on 10 August 1925 in a mansion, 'Sirinivasa', built by Mudaliyar Simon Fernando Sri Chandrasekera (who bequeathed the building to the government), on Sir Marcus Fernando Mawatha (formerly Edinburgh Crescent). At its formation, the library had three departments, the Reading Room, the Lending Room and the Reference Library. It had approximately 16,000 books, 94 members and seven staff, with S. C. Blok as the first principal librarian. In 1980 the library was relocated to a newly constructed building adjoining Viharamahadevi Park (formerly Victoria Park).

== Timeline ==
- In 2016, the library was fully automated with Koha FOSS Library Management System with the advice of the Open University of Sri Lanka.
- In 2017, the Digital Libraries Project was launched at the library by the Information Communication Technology Agency of Sri Lanka (ICTA) in collaboration with National Library and Documentation Services Board. In March 2019, the Colombo Digital Library officially launched.
- In 2020, the library system was upgraded to the latest versions under the guidance of the Open University of Sri Lanka.

== Branches ==
- Kirulapone Library (High level road, Kirulapone, Colombo 06)
- Mihindu Mawatha Library (Mihindu Mawatha, Colombo 12)
- Elliot Place Library (Elliot Place, Colombo 12)
- Kettarama Library (Kettarama Mawatha, Colombo 14)
- Mattakkuliya (Central Road, Colombo 15)
- Gunasinghe Park Little Library (Gunasinghe Park, Colombo 11)
- Kotahena Library (Kotahena, Colombo 13)
- Sri Sucharitha Library (Sucharitha Mawatha, Colombo 12)
- Peterson Lane Library (Peterson lane, Colombo 06)
- Belmont Street Library (Belmont Street, Colombo 12)
- Henry Pediris Children's Library (Pediris Park, Colombo 05)
- Bonavista Library (Bonavista Park, Colombo 15)
- Eli House Park Library

== See also ==
- List of libraries in Sri Lanka.
