= Trams in Colombo =

Colombo Electric Tramways

Operation
- Open: 13 January 1900
- Close: 30 June 1960

Infrastructure
- Track gauge: 3 ft 6 in (1,067 mm) Cape gauge

Statistics
- Track length (total): 12 km (7 mi)

Trams existed in Sri Lanka's capital Colombo from 1899 to 1960.

== History ==
In 1892 the Colombo Municipal Council called for tenders for the construction of tramways in the city. Three years later a contract was signed with Boustead Brothers, a private British company. Work on laying the tracks, overhead construction and the power station commenced in September 1897.

On 11 January 1900 the Ceylon Electric Tramways opened the country’s first tramway for public service with the ‘Grand Pass Route’ being the first section to open, followed by the ‘Borella (Maradana) Route’.

The tramways was eventually brought under Colombo Electric Tramways and Lighting Company Ltd after its formation in 1902, the same company that built the Pettah Power Station. The Pettah Power Station was the second power station established in the country and was used to power the tram network, mercantile offices, government buildings and street lights.

The whole of the track on both routes was relaid with 43 kg (95 lb) rails between December 1905 and August 1907, with all joints being welded by thermite process.

After a tram car strike in 1929, the Colombo Municipal Council took over operations of the electric tram system on 31 August 1944. The tram network were eventually scrapped in 1960.

The Colombo Municipal Council closed the service on 30 June 1960.

== Tram network ==
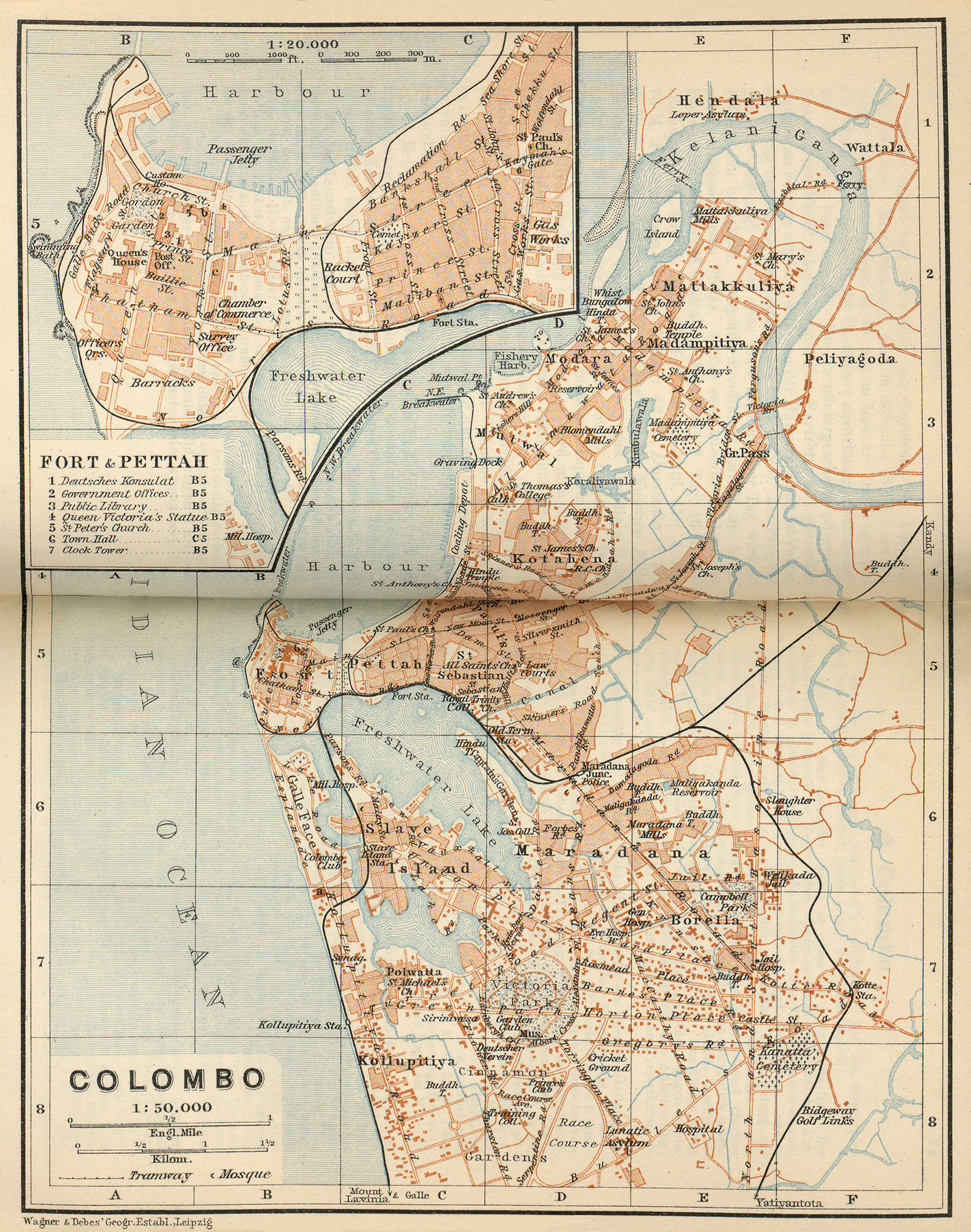
1914 map of the tram network and mosques in Colombo.

The tram network consisted of a single 12 km (7 mi) line which utilised a 42 in (107 cm) rail gauge. A total of 52 cars were in service, shuttling thousands of passengers between ten stops on the route from Maradana Station to Borella. The trams used trolley poles and consisted of open "toast-rack" type, and closed centre-entry type.

The average number of passengers carried on both routes in 1900 was 14,529 daily, in 1904 the number of passengers carried was 6,5559,059 and in 1905 was 6,555,338.

=== Tramway Route ===
The original two tramway routes were:

‘Grand Pass Route’

- Fort Terminus (opposite Grand Oriental Hotel)
- Coal Depot
- Pettah Market
- Main Street
- St Paul’s Church
- New Moon Street
- Messenger Street
- Grand Pass Road
- St Joseph’s College
- Grandpass
- River Kelani

‘Borella Tramway’

- Fort Terminus (opposite Grand Oriental Hotel)
- York Street
- Chatham Street
- North Road
- Fort Railway Station
- Lake and Royal College
- Ferry terminal to Captain’s Garden
- Railway Goods Station
- Technical College
- Pass over railway at Maradana Junction
- Police Headquarters
- Maradana Road
- Borella

== Incidents ==
- On 16 June 1899 at 10pm, a tramcar travelling along Maradana Road (now Gnanaratha Pradeepa Mawatha) collided with a pony cart travelling from Regent Street to Jail Road (now E W Perera Mawatha, and Ananda Rajakaruna Mawatha) causing injury to the two cart riders and pony, and damages to the cart and harness.

== Gallery ==
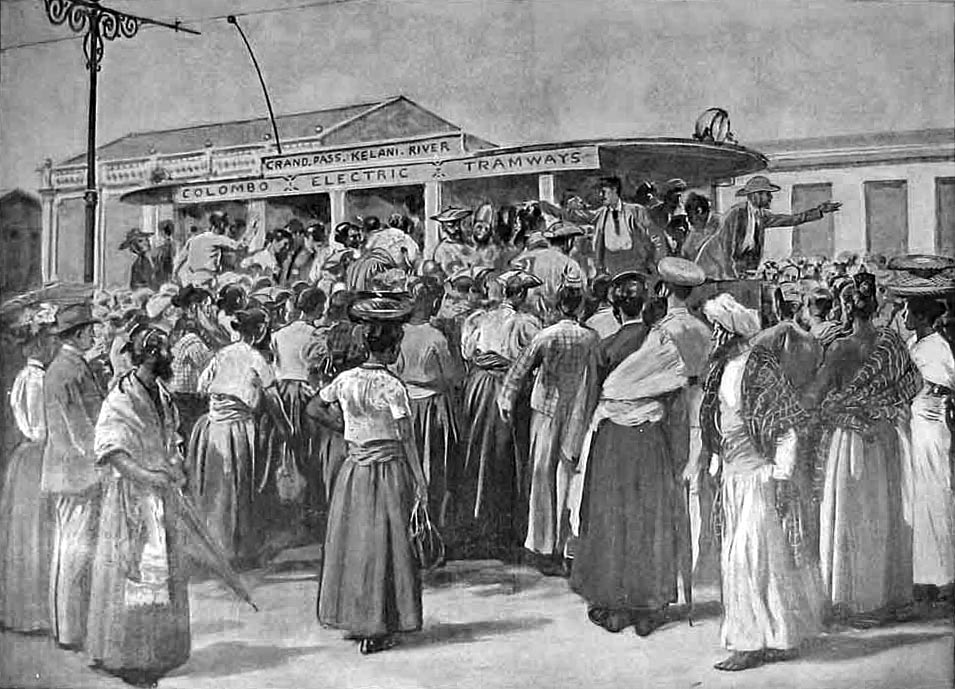
British, Arabs, and locals, boarding a tram in 1899.

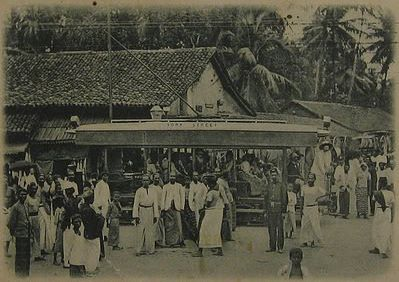
Tramcar in Colombo, c.1910.

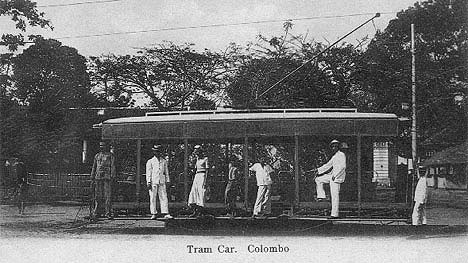
Tramcar in Colombo, c.1910.

== See also ==
- Sri Lanka Railways
- Electricity sector in Sri Lanka
