= Arthur Hamilton Ekneligoda Molamure =

Arthur Hamilton Ekneligoda Molamure was a Ceylonese (Sri Lankan) legislator. He was a member of the Legislative Council of Ceylon and had served as a police magistrate. He was arrested by the British during the 1915 Sinhalese-Muslim riots. Molamure was elected to the Legislative Council in the 1924 Ceylonese Legislative Council election from the Ratnapura Revenue District. He died in office in 1929 and he was succeeded by his nephew George R. de Silva in his constituency in the State Council of Ceylon that followed.
