= Sunil Kumara Gamage =

Sri Lankan politician

Hon. Sunil Kumara Gamage MP
- සුනිල් කුමාර ගමගේ சுனில் குமார கமகே

Minister of Sport and Youth Affairs
- Incumbent
- Assumed office 18 November 2024
- President: Anura Kumara Dissanayake
- Prime Minister: Harini Amarasuriya
- Preceded by: Anura Kumara Dissanayake

Member of Parliament for National List
- Incumbent
- Assumed office 21 November 2024

Personal details
- Party: National People's Power

Sunil Kumara Gamage is a Sri Lankan politician currently serving as the Minister Youth Affairs and Sports. He was appointed as a Member of Parliament for National List in 2024 Sri Lankan parliamentary election as a member of the National People's Power. He was made the Minister of Sports and Youth Affairs in November 2024, heading the Ministry of Sports and Youth Affairs in the Cabinet of Sri Lanka.
