= Borella =

Borella බොරැල්ල (Borælla) பொறளை (Poṟaḷai)
- Suburb
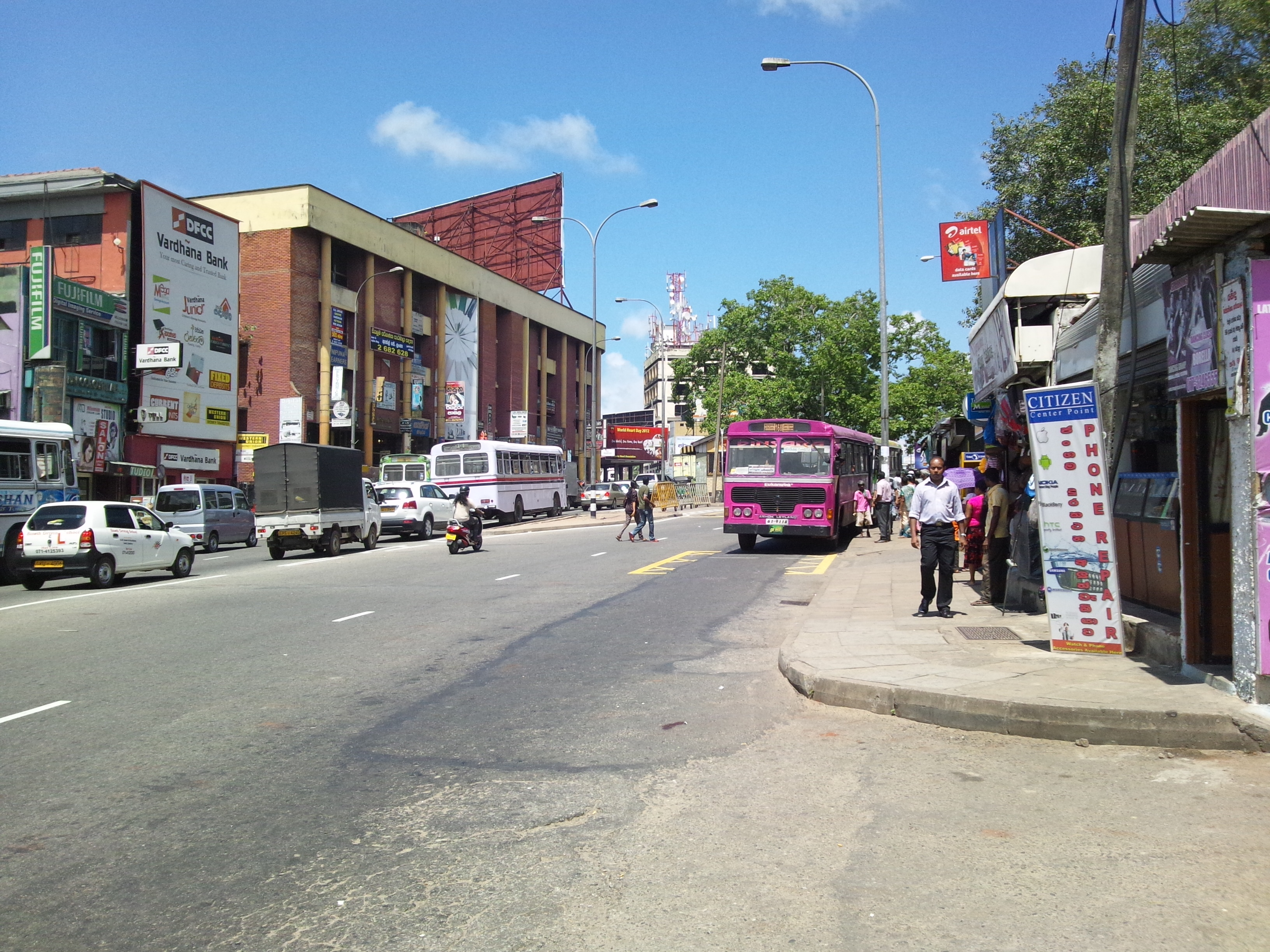
- Borella

- Location in Greater Colombo
- Coordinates: 6°54′53″N 79°52′40″E
- Country: Sri Lanka
- Province: Western Province
- District: Colombo District
- Time zone: UTC+5:30 (Sri Lanka Standard Time Zone)
- Postal Code: 00800

Borella is the largest suburb in Colombo, Sri Lanka represented by divisional code 8.

== Demographic ==
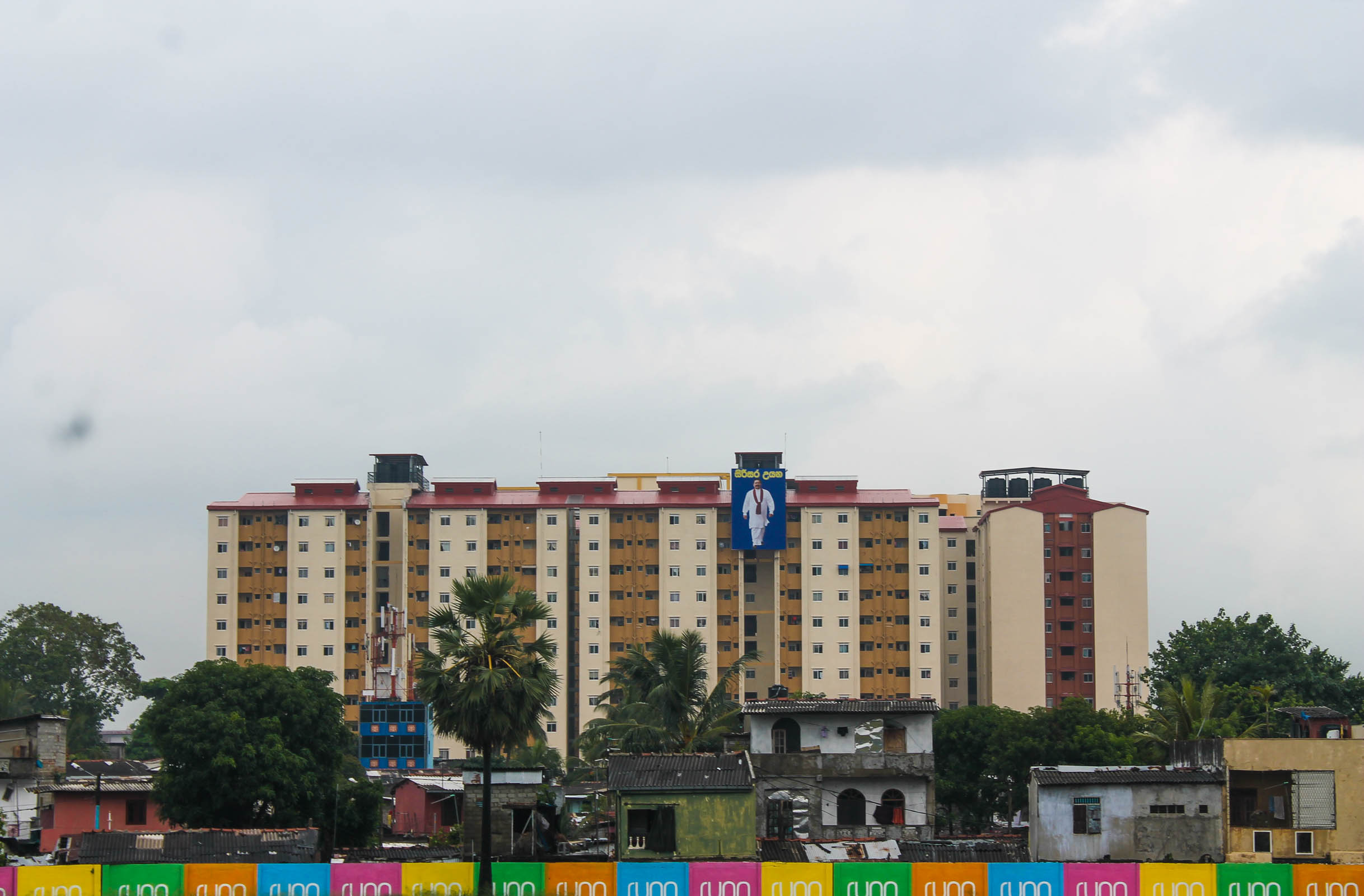
Sirisara Uyana Housing Scheme in Borella

Borella is a multi-religious and multi-ethnic area. The major ethnic communities in Borella are Sinhalese and Tamils. There are also various other minorities, such as Burghers, Sri Lankan Moors and others. Religions include Buddhism, Hinduism, Islam, Christianity and various other religions and beliefs to a lesser extent.

== History ==
The history of the settlement of Borella is dated from the 15th century as a village situated along a cart-track from the port of Colombo to Kotte. A Borella municipal market was built in 1910. Borella was also a terminus of the historical defunct Colombo tramway system. During the Black July riots in 1983, various properties in Borella were damaged.

== Sports venues ==
- Paikiasothy Saravanamuttu Stadium also known as P. Sara Oval and Tamil Union Cricket and Athletic Club.
- Royal Colombo Golf Club (also known as Ridgeway Links). Founded in 1879 it is the oldest in the country and one of the oldest in Asia.

== Schools ==
- Sunrise International Preschool
- Wesley College
- Bandaranayake Vidyalaya
- Carey College, Borella
- Devi Balika Vidyalaya
- C. W. W. Kannangara Vidyalaya
- Susamaya Wardana Maha Vidyalaya
- Rathnawali Balika Maha Vidyalaya
- Colombo Overseas School
- Gateway International School
- Oxford Overseas School

== Diplomatic missions ==
- Consulate of the Republic of Zambia
- Embassy of Turkey
- Embassy of Afghanistan
- Consulate of Benin

== Cemetery ==
Colombo's main burial ground and crematorium, Kanatte Cemetery, is located in Borella. It is situated at the intersection of Narahenpita Road (Elvitigala Mawatha), Bullers Road (Bauddhaloka Mawatha), and Baseline Road (D. S. Senanayake Mawtha) at a large traffic circle. The cemetery was established in 1840 and includes a section dedicated for those who died during World War I and II.
