= George R. de Silva =

Ceylonese politician (1898–1968)

De Silva

George Reginald de Silva (8 August 1898 – 28 July 1968) was a Ceylonese politician.

De Silva was elected as the member for Ratnapura on State Council of Ceylon, upon the death of his uncle, A. H. E. Molamure. In January 1943 he was elected as the Mayor of Colombo, a position he retained under December that year. In 1947 the Soulbury Constitution replaced the State Council with the Parliament of Ceylon, as part of a process of constitutional development leading up to the country's independence.

At the 1st parliamentary election, held between 23 August 1947 and 20 September 1947, de Silva successfully ran as the United National Party (UNP) candidate in the Colombo North electorate, securing 50.25% of the total vote.

He was subsequently appointed as Parliamentary Secretary to the Minister of Justice in the D. S. Senanayake cabinet. In 1951 de Silva crossed the floor, with five other UNP members, when the government refused to accept a resolution passed by the Sinhala Maha Sabha to adopt Buddhism and Sinhalese as the country's official religion and language.

At the 2nd parliamentary election, held between 24 May 1952 and 30 May 1952, de Silva re-contested the Colombo North electorate however this time as the Sri Lanka Freedom Party candidate. He was unsuccessful in his attempt, failing by 7,038 votes and finishing third out of a field of four, only securing 16% total of the vote.
