= Uvais Mohamed Imitiyas =

Sri Lankan mayor

His Worship Uvais Mohamed Imitiyas

Mayor of Colombo
- In office 2 June 2006 – 2011
- Preceded by: Prasanna Gunawardena
- Succeeded by: A. J. M. Muzammil

Personal details
- Party: Independent
- Occupation: Politician

Uvais Mohamed Imitiyas was the Mayor of Colombo from 2006 to 2011. Imtiyas was an Auto rickshaw driver from an impoverished background who contested local government elections on an independent ticket. At that stage he had no realistic chance of being elected. However, technical electoral issues (proposing an underage candidate in the list) meant that the UNP candidates led by Sirisena Cooray could not contest the election. An agreement was reached to use the symbol of Imitiyas's group on the condition that he would renounce the seat if elected, allowing the UNP to appoint a mayor of their own choice. UNP led by Cooray campaigned for the independent group and they won under the spectacles symbol, but Imitiyas reneged on the agreement and remained in office, joining the ruling UPFA and did not stand for re-election.
