= Rosy Senanayake =

Sri Lankan politician

Her Worship Rosy Senanayake JP, UM
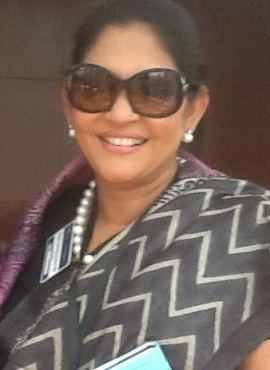
- Senanayake in 2013

Mayor of Colombo
- In office 19 March 2018 – 19 March 2023
- Preceded by: A. J. M. Muzammil
- Succeeded by: Vraîe Cally Balthazaar

Prime Minister's Spokesperson and the Deputy Head of the Prime Minister's Office
- In office 15 September 2015 – 19 March 2018
- Prime Minister: Ranil Wickremesinghe

State Minister for Child Affairs
- In office 12 January 2015 – 17 August 2015

Member of Parliament for Colombo District
- In office 22 April 2010 – 26 June 2015
- Majority: 66,357 Preferential Votes

Leader of the opposition of the Western Province Provincial Council
- In office 2009–2010

Sri Lankan High Commissioner to Malaysia
- In office 2001–2004

Personal details
- Born: 5 January 1958 (age 68) Colombo, Dominion of Ceylon
- Party: United National Party
- Spouse: Athula Senanayake
- Children: Kanishka; Thisakya; Radhya
- Education: Ferguson High School, Ratnapura
- Occupation: Politician
- Title: Mrs. World 1984 (First Mrs. World), Miss Asia Pacific International 1981, Miss World Sri Lanka 1980

Bernadine Rose Senanayake, JP, UM (née Ramanayake; born 5 January 1958), better known as Rosy Senanayake, is a Sri Lankan politician, beauty pageant titleholder and activist currently serving as Presidential Advisor on Local Government affairs. She was the Mayor of Colombo from 2018 to 2023, and former Prime Minister's Spokesperson and the Deputy Head of the Prime Minister's Office for Ranil Wickramasinghe. She has been an activist on several issues and an active figure in the opposition gaining much limelight.

Rosy Senanayake was the former state minister for child development under President Maithripala Sirisena. She was also the leader of the opposition in Western Provincial Council and the chief organizer of United National Party for the Colombo West electorate. Senanayake has served as the Sri Lankan High Commissioner for Malaysia and was a Goodwill Ambassador for the United Nations Population Fund.

== Family ==
She was educated at Embilipitiya Maha Vidayala (1969–1974) and Ferguson High School, Ratnapura. She married the late Athula Senanayake, an entrepreneur who is the son of Stanley Senanayake, a former Inspector General of Police and Maya Senanayake, the daughter of the founder of Nalanda College, Colombo, P. de S. Kularatne (MP). They (Athula and Rosy) have three children, Kanishka, Thisakya, and Radhya.

== Beauty Pageant ==
Senanayake won the first Mrs. World competition in 1984. She is also a former Miss Asia Pacific International 1981 and competed as Miss Sri Lanka in Miss World 1980.

== Community work ==
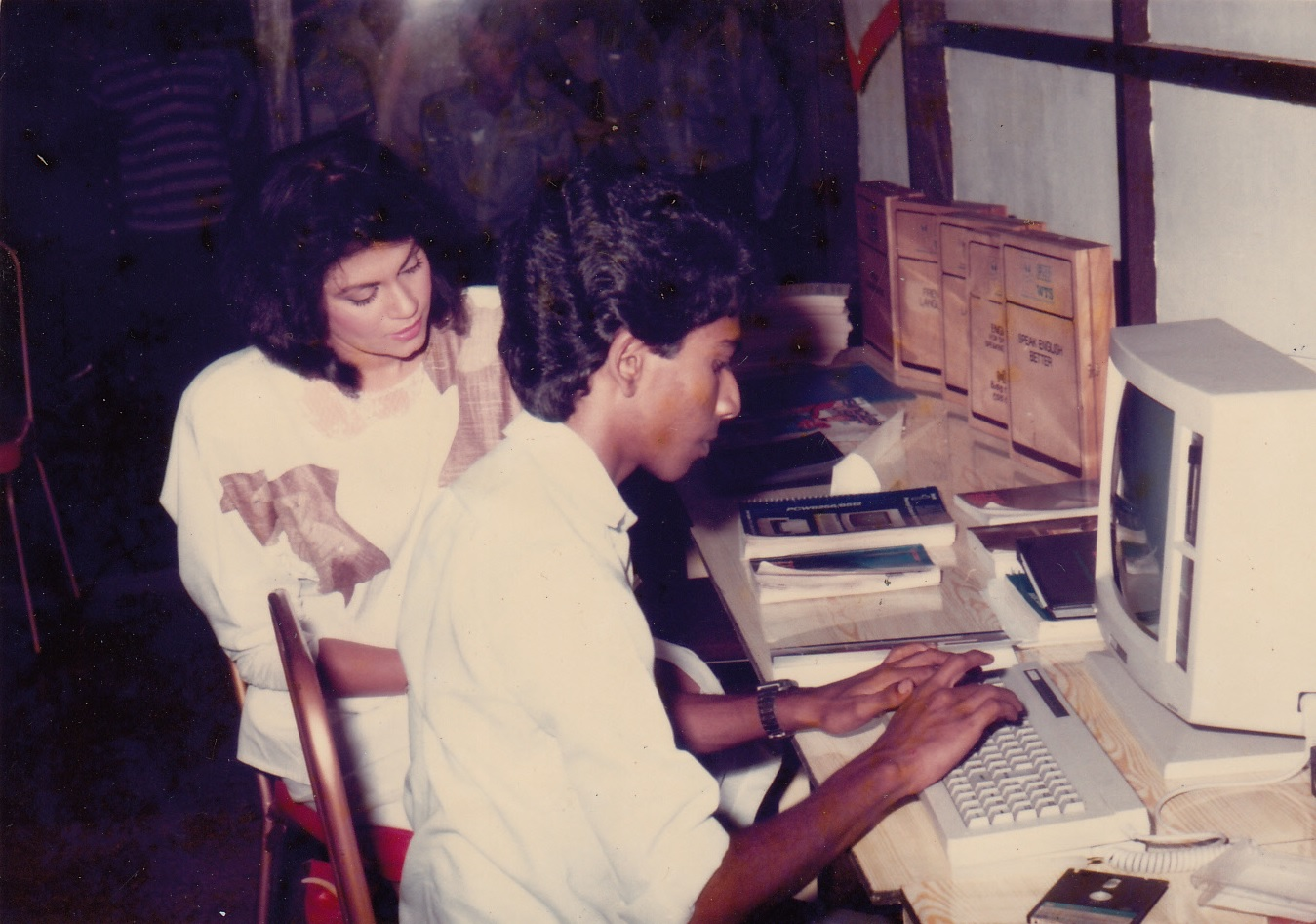
Rosy Senanayake officiating as Chief Guest at opening of Computer Training Center in the late 1980s - also shown Priyanke (Anthonus) de Silva.

Her professional life has been devoted to promoting Sri Lanka and particularly Sri Lankan trade to the world. She works for the rights of women and adolescents in her country and as a United Nations Population Fund Goodwill Ambassador. Through the National Youth Services Council she promoted reproductive health services for young people and for migrant women workers in Sri Lanka's Free Trade Zone.

Senanayake has worked with the private sector to provide reproductive health services to employees of private companies in Sri Lanka and recently starred in a film about reproductive health. Through her popular daytime television program Eliya she has become an icon for women's and children's causes in Sri Lanka.

== Diplomatic work ==
In 1998 she was appointed as a United Nations Population Fund Goodwill Ambassador. Senanayake was appointed as Sri Lankan High Commissioner to Malaysia in 2002, which she held until 2004.

== Politics ==
A major opposition activist, she is the Chief Organiser for the Colombo West Electorate of the United National Party. She was elected to the Western Provincial Council in 2009, topping the preferential votes list in Colombo District by obtaining 80,884 votes. There, she served as the Leader of the Opposition until being elected to the parliament in 2010 securing the fourth place in the UNP list with 66,357 preferences. In Parliament, she has raised several prominent issues such as violence against women and children, chauvinism and socio-cultural and socio-economic problems affecting Sri Lanka.

The UK-based Guardian in its edition of 14 June 2013 published an article titled, "Top 10 sexist moments in politics: Julia Gillard, Hillary Clinton and more" which described an encounter in 2012 between Rosy Senanayake and Kumara Welgama, Sri Lanka's transport minister, as sexist. Welgama is quoted as saying, "You are such a charming woman. I cannot explain my feelings here. But if you meet me outside Parliament, I will describe them … My thoughts are running riot … I don't want to reveal [them] to the public." Senanayake was unimpressed, saying, "......As a woman you are not recognised as a person who has done so many portfolios, but always referred to as the beauty you were in your heyday. I consider that as a sexist remark."

== Allegations ==
Witnesses appearing before Presidential Commission of Inquiry stated that Rosy Senanayake had leaked some secret information of the Committee on Public Enterprises (COPE) in Parliament to the Perpetual Treasuries Limited (PTL). Nuwan Salgado, the chief dealer of PTL, revealed at the commission that Arjun Aloysius, the chief executive officer of the PTL, had received a document in 2016 related to the COPE from Rosy's son, the son of Rosy Senanayake. Rosy rejected the allegations stating that she was not a Member of Parliament at the time.

== See also ==
- Sri Lankan Non Career Diplomats
