= Ministry of Parliamentary Affairs (Sri Lanka) =

Ministry overview
- Formed: 7 April 1993
- Dissolved: 26 May 2017
- Superseding Ministry: Ministry of Lands and Parliamentary Reforms
- Jurisdiction: Democratic Socialist Republic of Sri Lanka
- Website: minparliament.gov.lk

The Ministry of Parliamentary Affairs was a Sri Lankan government ministry responsible for providing support to Members of the Sri Lankan Parliament, through the provision of office space and equipment, personal staff, salary and insurance services and training to MPs. The duties of the ministry were merged with those of the Ministry of Lands and Parliamentary Reforms in May 2017, essentially resulting in the dissolution of the ministry.

== List of ministers ==
Minister of Parliamentary Affairs of Sri Lanka
- Appointer: President of Sri Lanka
- Inaugural holder: Wimal Wickramasinghe
- Formation: 7 April 1993
- Final holder: Gayantha Karunathilaka
- Abolished: 26 May 2017 (merged)

The minister of parliamentary affairs was an appointment in the Cabinet of Sri Lanka.

Parties

Sri Lanka Freedom Party United National Party

Name	Portrait	Party	Tenure	President	Ministerial title
Wimal Wickramasinghe		United National Party	7 April 1993 – 16 August 1994	Ranasinghe Premadasa; Dingiri Banda Wijetunga	Minister of Environment & Parliamentary Affairs
Ratnasiri Wickremanayake		Sri Lanka Freedom Party	27 August 1994 – 9 June 1997	Chandrika Kumaratunga	Minister of Public Administration, Plantation Industries & Parliamentary Affairs
Jeyaraj Fernandopulle		Sri Lanka Freedom Party	9 July 1997 – 10 October 2000	Chandrika Kumaratunga	Minister of Plan Implementation & Parliamentary Affairs
S. B. Dissanayake		Sri Lanka Freedom Party	19 October 2000 – 13 September 2001	Chandrika Kumaratunga	Minister of Samurdhi, Rural Development, Up country Development & Parliamentary Affairs
Maithripala Sirisena		Sri Lanka Freedom Party	14 September 2001 – 7 December 2001	Chandrika Kumaratunga	Minister of Mahaweli Development & Parliamentary Affairs
A. H. M. Azwer		Sri Lanka Freedom Party	12 December 2001 – 7 February 2004	Chandrika Kumaratunga	Minister of Parliamentary Affairs
Milroy Fernando		Sri Lanka Freedom Party	24 April 2004 – 18 July 2005	Chandrika Kumaratunga	Minister of Christian & Parliamentary Affairs
Wiswa Warnapala		Sri Lanka Freedom Party	2 August 2005 – 1 March 2007	Mahinda Rajapaksa	Minister of Parliamentary Affairs
M. H. Mohamed		Sri Lanka Freedom Party	2 March 2007 – 2010	Mahinda Rajapaksa	Minister of Parliamentary Affairs
Sumedha G. Jayasena		Sri Lanka Freedom Party	23 April 2010 – 8 January 2015	Mahinda Rajapaksa	Minister of Parliamentary Affairs
Gayantha Karunathilaka		United National Party	9 January 2015 – 26 May 2017	Maithripala Sirisena	Minister of Parliamentary Affairs

== See also ==
- List of ministries of Sri Lanka
- Ministry of Lands and Parliamentary Reforms
