= Mayor of Colombo =

Mayor and head of the Colombo Municipal Council

- Incumbent; Vraîe Cally Balthazaar since 16 June 2025
- Colombo Municipal Council
- Style: His/ Her Worship
- Residence: Sirinivasa
- Seat: Town Hall, Colombo
- Constituting instrument: Municipal Council Ordinance No. 17 of 1865
- Formation: 1866; 160 years ago
- First holder: Ratnasothy Saravanamuttu
- Deputy: Deputy Mayor of Colombo

The Mayor of Colombo is the elected head of the Colombo Municipal Council. The post was created in 1866 when the Colombo Municipal Council was established by the Legislative Council of Ceylon. The mayor is assisted by the deputy mayor and a Municipal Commissioner.The current mayor is Vraîe Cally Balthazaar, who took office on 16 June 2025.

== Election ==
The mayor is elected in a general election held under the Local Authority Election Ordinance from the party gaining the highest number of seats in the municipal council. Once elected the mayor may hold office for four years.

== Powers and functions ==
Most powers are derived from the Municipal Council Ordinance No. 29 of 1947. The Mayor serves as the chief executive of the municipal council.

The municipal council is responsible for:

- Social service
- Health and environmental issues
- Emergency services (not policing, which is the responsibility of the central government)
- Urban planning
- Sanitation (waste, sewage)

== Rights and privileges ==
The mayoral office is located at the Colombo Town Hall and the official mayoral residence is Sirinivasa. The mayor's legal title is His/Her Worship the Mayor of Colombo.

Under the provisions of the Municipal Councils Ordinance the mayor and deputy mayor are ex-official Justice of the Peace and Unofficial Magistrates for the administrative district in which the municipality is situated for the duration of their tenure. This is provided so that the mayor or deputy mayor may preside over the municipal magistrate's court.

=== Official dress ===
On formal occasions the Mayor wears a scarlet gown with the Mayoral Chain of Office.

=== Salary ===
The Mayor of Colombo's salary is Rs 30,000 per month, which is same of all mayors of municipalities in Sri Lanka.

== List of mayors ==
Parties

United National Party Lanka Sama Samaja Party National People's Power Independent

Chairmen
Name	Portrait	Took office	Left office	Refs
Charles Peter Layard		January 1866	June 1877	
Frederick Richard Saunders		July 1877	December 1883	
William Dumaresq Wright		January 1884	6 August 1886	
G. S. Williams		August 1886	August 1887	
George Thomas Michael O'Brien		September 1887	September 1887	
Lionel Frederick Lee		October 1887	November 1887	
Hardinge Hay Cameron		November 1887	September 1893	
Charles Edward Ducat Pennycuick		October 1893	April 1895	
Ferdinando Hamblyn Price		May 1895	March 1901	
Arthur Sampson Pagden		April 1901	February 1905	
E. M. de C. Short		March 1905	May 1910	
K. W. B. McLeod		May 1910	April 1912	
C. R. Cumberland		May 1912	November 1912	
W. E. Thorpe		December 1912	January 1913	
E. B. Alexander		February 1913	October 1913	
R. W. Byrde		November 1913	September 1919	
T. Reid		October 1919	July 1924	
Hubert Ernest Newnham		August 1924	July 1931	
Walter Terence Stace		July 1931	March 1932	
William Lindsay Murphy		March 1932	March 1935	
William Lindsay Murphy		November 1935	May 1937	

Mayors
Name	Portrait	Party	Took office	Left office	Refs
Ratnasothy Saravanamuttu			May 1937	December 1937	
V. R. S. Schokman			January 1938	December 1939	
A. E. Goonesinghe			January 1940	December 1940	
Ratnasothy Saravanamuttu			January 1941	December 1942	
George R. de Silva			January 1943	December 1943	
R. A. de Mel			January 1944	December 1944	
R. S. F. de Mel			January 1945	December 1945	
R. A. de Mel			January 1946	December 1946	
R. S. F. de Mel			January 1947	December 1949	
Kumaran Ratnam			January 1950	December 1950	
S. Sellamuttu			January 1951	December 1951	
C. T. Grero			January 1952	11 August 1953	
T. Rudra			21 September 1953	13 August 1954	
N. M. Perera		Lanka Sama Samaja Party	13 August 1954	28 February 1956	
V. A. Sugathadasa		United National Party	6 March 1956	1 December 1957	
M. H. Mohamed		United National Party	12 January 1960	10 January 1963	
V. A. Sugathadasa		United National Party	10 January 1963	10 April 1965	
Vincent Perera		United National Party	10 April 1965	1966	
Jabir A. Cader		United National Party	1966	1969	
Vincent Perera		United National Party	1970	1973	
A. H. M. Fowzie		United National Party	1974	1977	
B. Sirisena Cooray		United National Party	1979	1989	
M. Hussain Mohamad		United National Party	1989	1991	
Ratnasiri Rajapakse		United National Party	1991	1994	
K. Ganeshalingam		United National Party	June 1996	March 1997	
Karu Jayasuriya		United National Party	1997	1999	
Omar Kamil		United National Party	1999	2002	
Prasanna Gunawardena		United National Party	3 June 2002	2006	
Uvais Mohamed Imitiyas		Independent UNP-backed	2 June 2006	2010	
A. J. M. Muzammil		United National Party	17 October 2011	31 March 2016	
Rosy Senanayake		United National Party	6 March 2018	19 March 2023	
Vraîe Cally Balthazaar		National People's Power	16 June 2025		

== Sources ==
- Hulugalle, H. A. J. (September 1965). Centenary Volume of the Colombo Municipal Council (1865 – 1965) (PDF). Colombo Municipal Council. pp. 53–54. Archived (PDF) from the original on 2024-08-01.
- "Past Mayors of Colombo". Colombo Municipal Council. Archived from the original on 2014-08-20.
- Wagista, Kumaradasa (1 February 1998). "Century of caring for Colombo". The Sunday Times (Sri Lanka).
- Maniccavasagar, Chelvatamby (24 February 2012). "Colombo Municipal Council's 147th anniversary: Largest Local Authority in SL". Daily News (Sri Lanka). Archived from the original on 28 December 2014.
- Warnakulasuriya, Deepal (27 May 2007). "Colombo Mayor in a quagmire!". Sunday Observer (Sri Lanka).
- Amaranayake, Vindya; Wamanan, Arthur (26 September 2010). "In defence of the CMC…". The Nation (Sri Lanka).
