= Municipal Commissioner (Sri Lanka) =

The Municipal Commissioner heads the staff and administration of a municipal in Sri Lanka. The Municipal Commissioner is appointed by the minister of local government or which ever minister the subject is vested under. Usually the appointment would be made from an officer seconded from the Sri Lanka Administrative Service. In the absence of the mayor or deputy mayor or following the end of term of the council, the commissioner would serve as the officer implementing the powers and functions of the Colombo municipal council.
