= A. H. M. Fowzie =

Sri Lankan politician (born 1937)

Hon. A. H. M. Fowzie MP
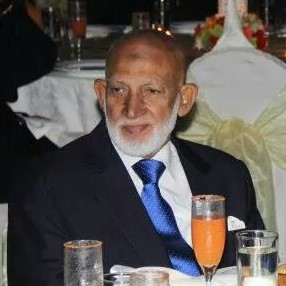

Member of Parliament for Colombo District
- In office 9 February 2023 – 24 September 2024
- Preceded by: Mujibar Rahuman

Minister of Highways
- In office 2000–2001

Minister of Environment & Natural Resources

Minister of Petroleum & Petroleum Resources Development

Minister of Disaster Management
- In office 2010–2015

Member of Parliament for National List
- In office 2015–2020

Mayor of Colombo
- In office 1974–1977

Personal details
- Born: Abdul Hameed Mohamed Fowzie; 13 October 1937 (age 88)
- Party: Samagi Jana Balawegaya
- Other political affiliations: Sri Lanka Freedom Party

Abdul Hameed Mohamed Fowzie (born 13 October 1937) is a Sri Lankan politician, a member of the Parliament of Sri Lanka and a former government minister. He served as Mayor of Colombo between 1974 and 1977. Fowzie was a parliament member from 1996, representing the United National Party, but later joined the Sri Lanka Freedom Party.

In 2009 he was injured while walking with a crowd in the Akuressa suicide bombing. He joined the National Government of Sri Lanka led by the United National Party as the Minister of Disaster Management.

He re-entered parliament in 2023, after being elected as the Samagi Jana Balawegaya representative from the Colombo District, following the resignation of Mujibur Rahman, who ran for Colombo mayor.

== Legal issues ==
On 27 August 2024, the Colombo High Court sentenced Fowzie to two years of rigorous imprisonment, which was suspended for ten years after he pleaded guilty to misusing a company vehicle belonging to the Ministry of Disaster Management. The court also imposed a fine of Rs. 400,000.

== See also ==
- Cabinet of Sri Lanka
