= Colombo Municipal Council =

Local council for Colombo, Sri Lanka

Colombo Municipal Council කොළඹ මහා නගර සභාව கொழும்பு மாநகர சபை

Type
- Type: Local authority of Greater Colombo
- Houses: Unicameral
- Term limits: Four years

History
- Founded: 1866; 160 years ago

Leadership
- Mayor of Colombo: Vraîe Cally Balthazaar, NPP
- Deputy Mayor: Hemantha Kumara, NPP
- Municipal Commissioner: J. M. Bhadrani Jayawardena

Structure
- Seats: 1 Mayor and 116 Municipal Councilors
- Political groups: Government (61): NPP (48); Ind (9); UPA (2); NPPT (1); DNA (1); Opposition (56): SJB (29); UNP (13); SLPP (5); SLMC (4); SB (2); NFF (1); PA (1); URF (1)
- Length of term: Four years

Elections
- Last election: 6 May 2025
- Next election: TBD

Meeting place
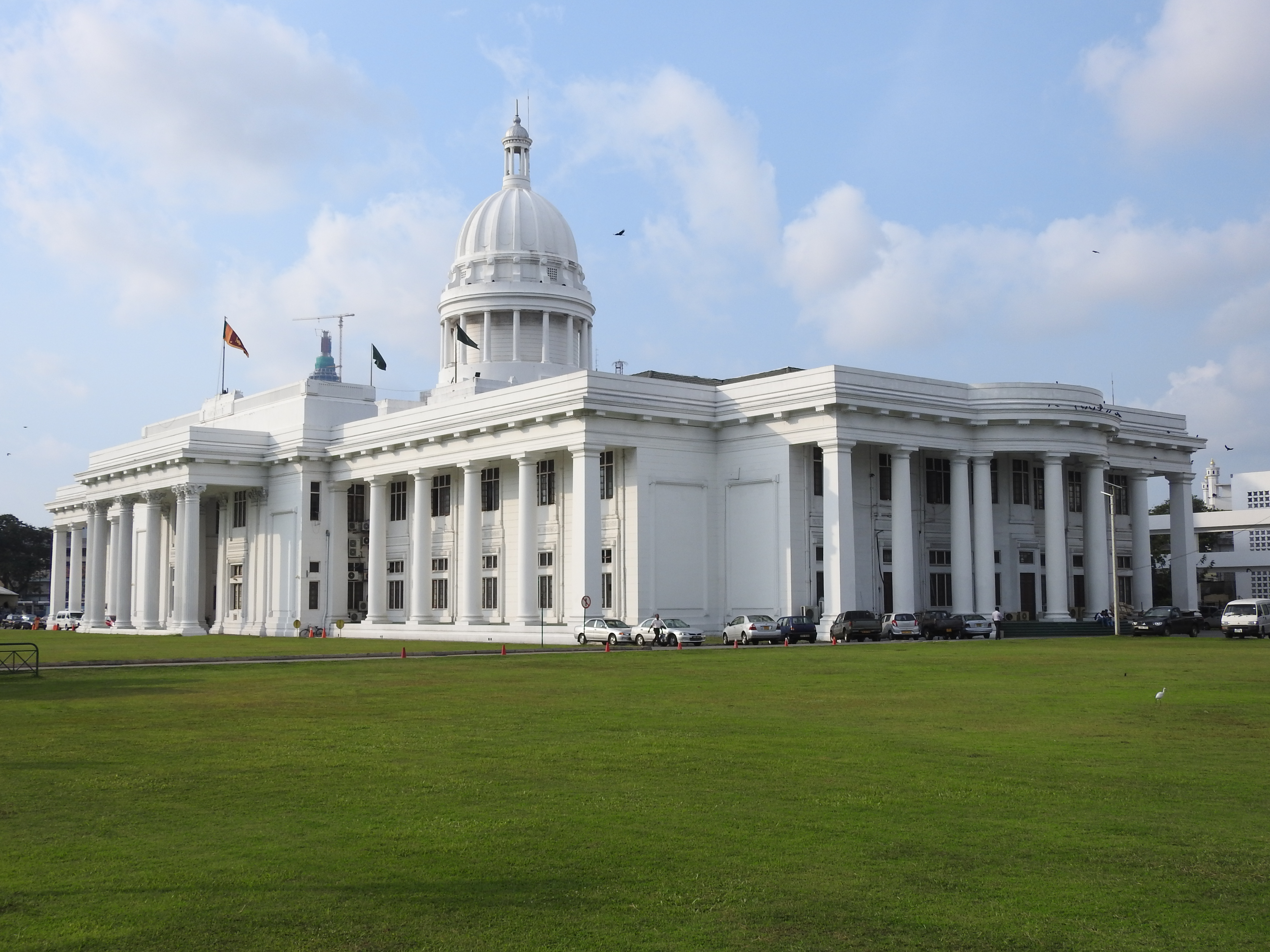
- Town Hall, Colombo

Website
- www.colombo.mc.gov.lk

The Colombo Municipal Council is the municipal governing body of Colombo, the largest city and financial centre in Sri Lanka. It consists of a directly elected executive Mayor of Colombo, and elected 119 municipal councilors. The council was formed in 1865, it first met in 1866 and derives most of its powers from Municipal Council Ordinance No. 29 of 1947.

It is the oldest and the largest local government authority in Sri Lanka which covers a resident population of over 600,000 (as of 2001). It is one of the largest employers in the country with over 12,000 employees.

== Council ==
Colombo is a charter city, with a Mayor Council form of government. Colombo's mayor and the council members are elected through local government elections held once in four years. It has 16 standing committees on various subjects.

== Officers ==
The Colombo Municipal Council under the Municipal Council Ordinance have several elected and appointed officers. These are:

1. Mayor
2. Deputy Mayor
3. Municipal Magistrate
4. Municipal Commissioner
5. Municipal Secretary
6. Deputy Municipal Commissioner (Engineering services)
7. Municipal Treasurer
8. Chief Medical Officer Of Health
9. Chief Municipal Veterinary Surgeon
10. Municipal Assessor
11. Chief Librarian
12. Charity Commissioner
13. Chief Fire Officer

== Administration ==
The Mayor serves as the head of the council assisted by a Deputy Mayor. A Municipal Commissioner heads the staff and administration municipal, which is made up of 16 departments. The Municipal Commissioner is appointed by the minister of local government or which ever minister the subject is vested under. Usually the appointment would be made from an officer seconded from the Sri Lanka Administrative Service. In the absence of the mayor or deputy mayor or following the end of term of the council, the commissioner would serve as the officer implementing the powers and functions of the Colombo municipal council. Municipal Commissioner is entitled to use of Park House, Colombo as an official residence which is a 16 bedroom mansion at Albert Crescent, Colombo 7.

=== Departments ===
The Colombo municipal council is made up of 16 departments. These include:

- Mayor's Office
- Municipal Treasurer’s Department
- Municipal Secretary Department
- Municipal Engineer’s Department
- Municipal Health Department
- Municipal Veterinary Department
- Curative Department
- Indigenous Health Department
- Public Library Department (Colombo Public Library)
- Public Assistance Department
- Legal Department
- Sports and Recreation Department
- Training and Development Department
- Municipal Assessor’s Department
- Central Procurement Department
- Fire Service Department (Colombo Fire Brigade)

== Powers and functions ==
The municipal council is responsible for:

- Urban planning, architectural designs
- Sanitation (waste, sewage)
- Health and environmental issues
- Emergency services (not policing, which is the responsibility of the central government)
- Social service
- Road management

== Population ==
The Colombo Municipal Council covers the Colombo and Thimbirigasyaya Divisional Secretariat Divisions. According to the 2011-12 Census the population living within the boundaries of the CMC was 555,031. Of this number, 318,048 lived in the Colombo DSD (the Northern part of the city) and 236,983 lived in the Thimbirigasyaya DSD (the Southern part).

== Political make up ==
For the past 50 years the city had been dominated by the United National Party (UNP), a right leaning party, whose business friendly policies resonate with the population of Colombo. The UNP as held majority in the council and post of Mayor since the party was formed in 1947, with two brief exceptions. In 1954, the UNP lost the municipal election to the Trotskyist Lanka Sama Samaja Party (LSSP) and Dr N. M. Perera was elected Mayor. The LSSP won several local government elections that year including nine Village Councils and three Urban Councils, apart from the Colombo Municipal Council. In 2006, the UNP nomination list for the 2006 Municipal elections was rejected, and an Independent Group supported by the UNP won the elections. Uvais Mohamed Imitiyas was subsequently appointed Mayor of Colombo. The former Mayoress Rosy Senanayake, the first female Mayor of Colombo, was elected in 2018 representing the UNP.

== National politics ==
Colombo as the largest city and former capital of Sri Lanka, has been at the center of Sri Lankan politics. The Colombo municipal council has been an entry route for many politicians. Four national leaders, which includes two presidents, J. R. Jayewardene and Ranasinghe Premadasa; one prime minister S. W. R. D. Bandaranaike, and an independence activist Vivienne Goonewardene started their political career by contesting for the Colombo municipal council.

== Representation ==
The Colombo Municipal Council Municipal Council is divided into 47 wards and is represented by 117 councillors, elected using an open list proportional representation system.

=== 2025 Local government election ===
Results of the local government election held on 6 May 2025.

Alliances and parties	Votes	%	Seats	Seat change
National People's Power	81,814	36.92%	48	▲42
Samagi Jana Balawegaya	58,375	26.34%	29	New party
United National Party	26,297	11.87%	13	▼47
Sri Lanka Podujana Peramuna	9,341	4.21%	5	▼18
Sri Lanka Muslim Congress	8,630	3.89%	4	▲4
Independent Group 3	5,934	2.68%	3	▲3
Independent Group 5	4,659	2.1%	2	▲2
United Peace Alliance	4,473	2.02%	2	▼8
Sarvajana Balaya	3,911	1.76%	2	New party
Independent Group 4	3,640	1.64%	2	▲2
People's Alliance	2,754	1.24%	1	▼11
National Freedom Front	2,398	1.08%	1	New party
United Republican Front	2,157	0.97%	1	New party
Independent Group 1	1,909	0.86%	1	▲1
Independent Group 2	1,791	0.81%	1	▲1
Democratic National Alliance	1,370	0.62%	1	▲1
National Peoples Party	950	0.43%	1	▲1
Valid Votes	221,624	96.96%	117	▲2
Rejected Votes	5,609	2.47%		
Total Polled	221,624			
Registered Electors	394,533			
Turnout	57.6 %			

=== 2018 Local government election ===
Results of the local government election held on 10 February 2018.

Alliances and parties	Votes	%	Seats	Seat change
United National Party	131,353	46.03%	60	▲36
Sri Lanka Podujana Peramuna	60,487	21.20%	23	New party
United People's Freedom Alliance	31,421	11.01%	12	▼4
United Peace Alliance	27,168	9.52%	10	New party
Janatha Vimukthi Peramuna	14,234	4.99%	6	▲5
Sri Lanka National Force	3,251	1.14%	1	New party
Ceylon Worker's Congress	2,853	1.00%	1	▲1
United National Front	2,771	0.97%	1	▲1
United National Freedom Front	1,380	0.48%	1	New party
Valid Votes	285,380	97.60%	115	▲62
Rejected Votes	7,023	2.40%		
Total Polled	227,233			
Registered Electors	394,044			
Turnout	74.21%			

=== 2011 Local government election ===
Results of the local government election held on 8 October 2011.

Alliances and parties	Votes	%	Seats	Seat change
United National Party	101,920	43.01%	24	▲24
United People's Freedom Alliance	77,089	32.53%	16	▲2
Democratic Peoples Front	26,229	11.07%	6	▲2
Sri Lanka Muslim Congress	9,979	4.21%	2	▲2
Democratic Unity Alliance	7,830	3.30%	2	Steady
Independent Group 2	4,085	1.72%	1	Steady
Janatha Vimukthi Peramuna	3,162	1.33%	1	▼1
Independent Group 1	2,962	1.25%	1	▲1
Valid Votes	205,235	95.48%	53	Steady
Rejected Votes	9,725	4.52%		
Total Polled	214,960			
Registered Electors	395,914			
Turnout	54.29%			

== See also ==
- Local government in Sri Lanka
- Municipal councils of Sri Lanka
