= Cinnamon Gardens =

Cinnamon Gardens කුරුඳු වත්ත கறுவாத் தோட்டம்
- Suburb
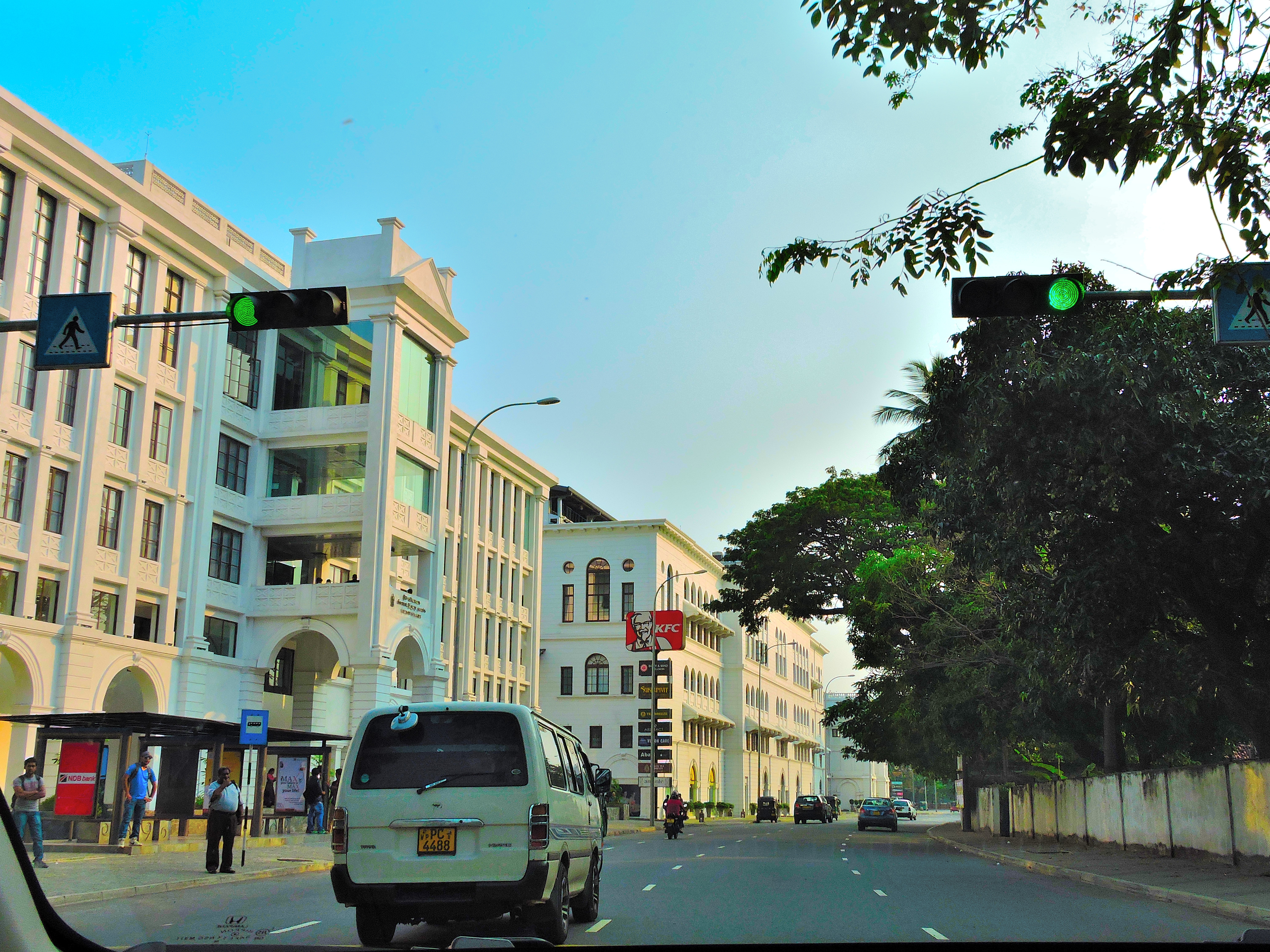
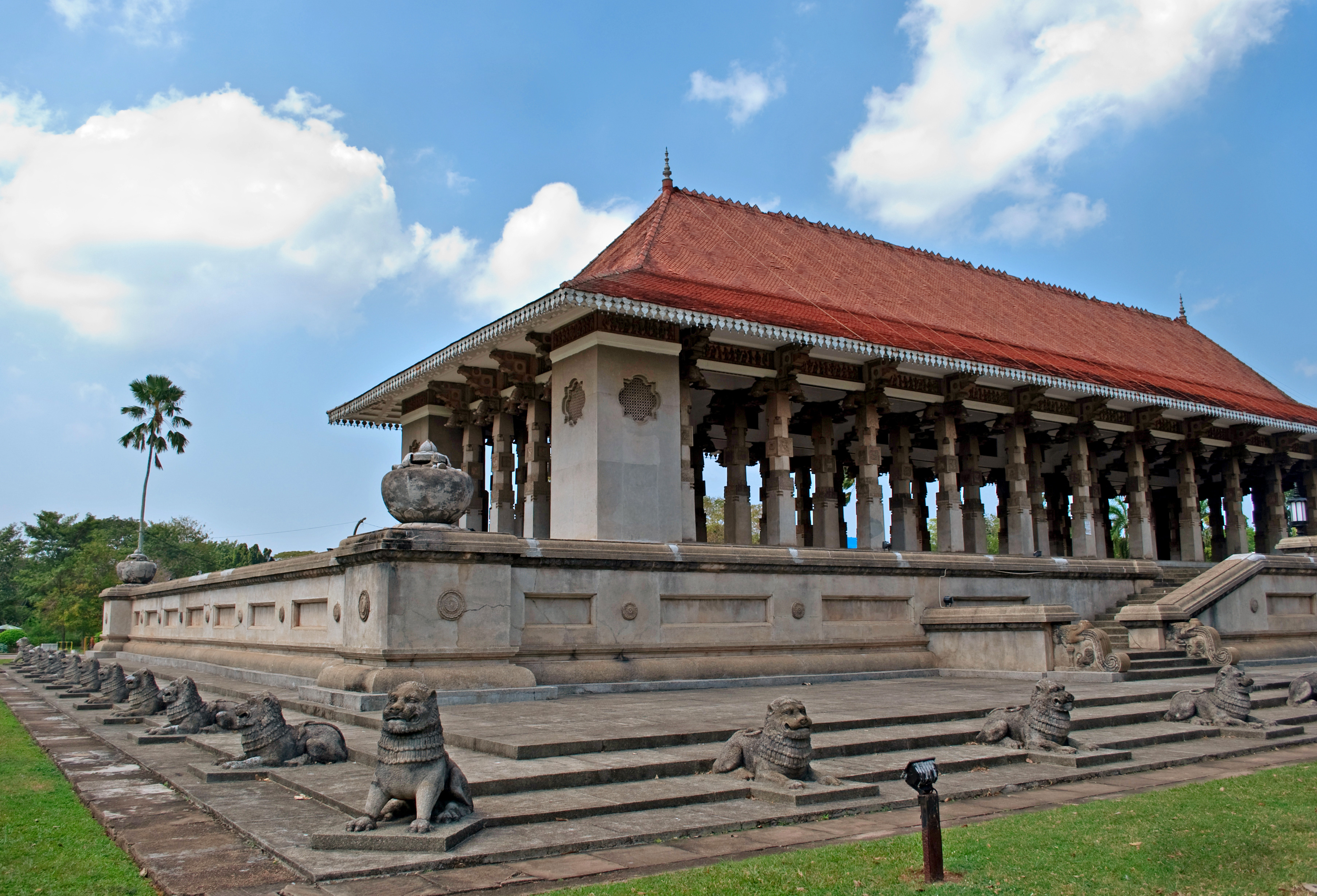
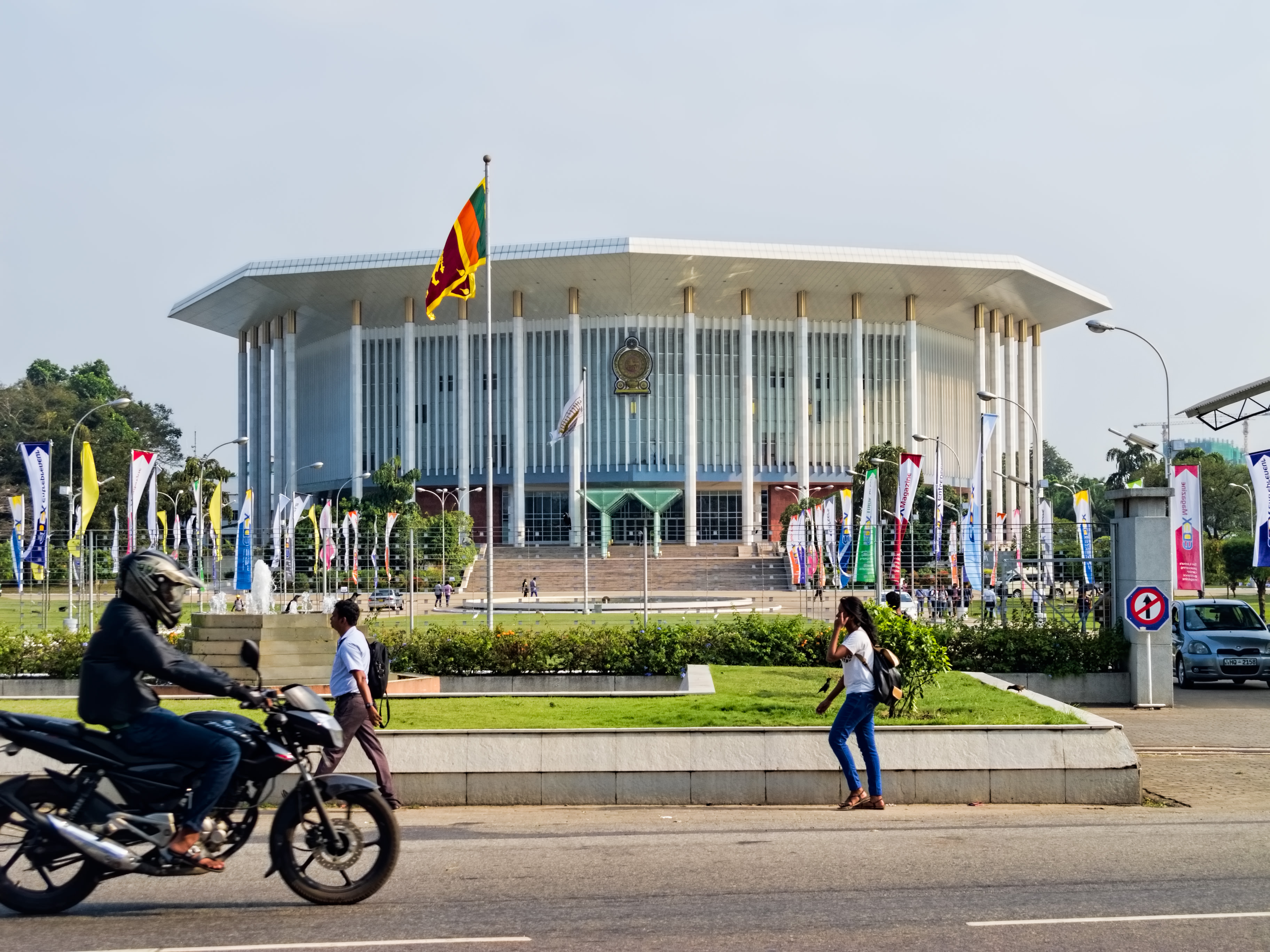
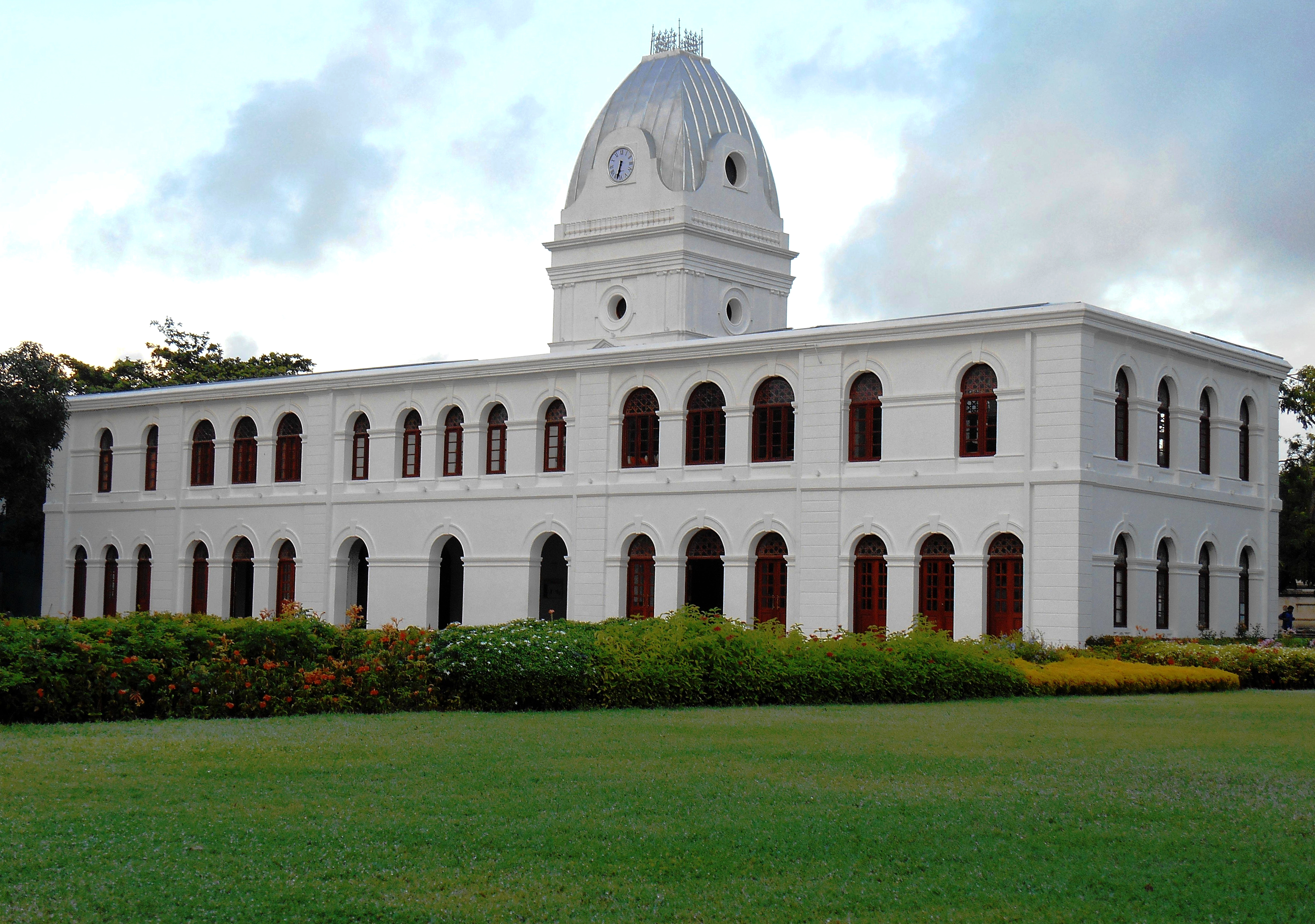
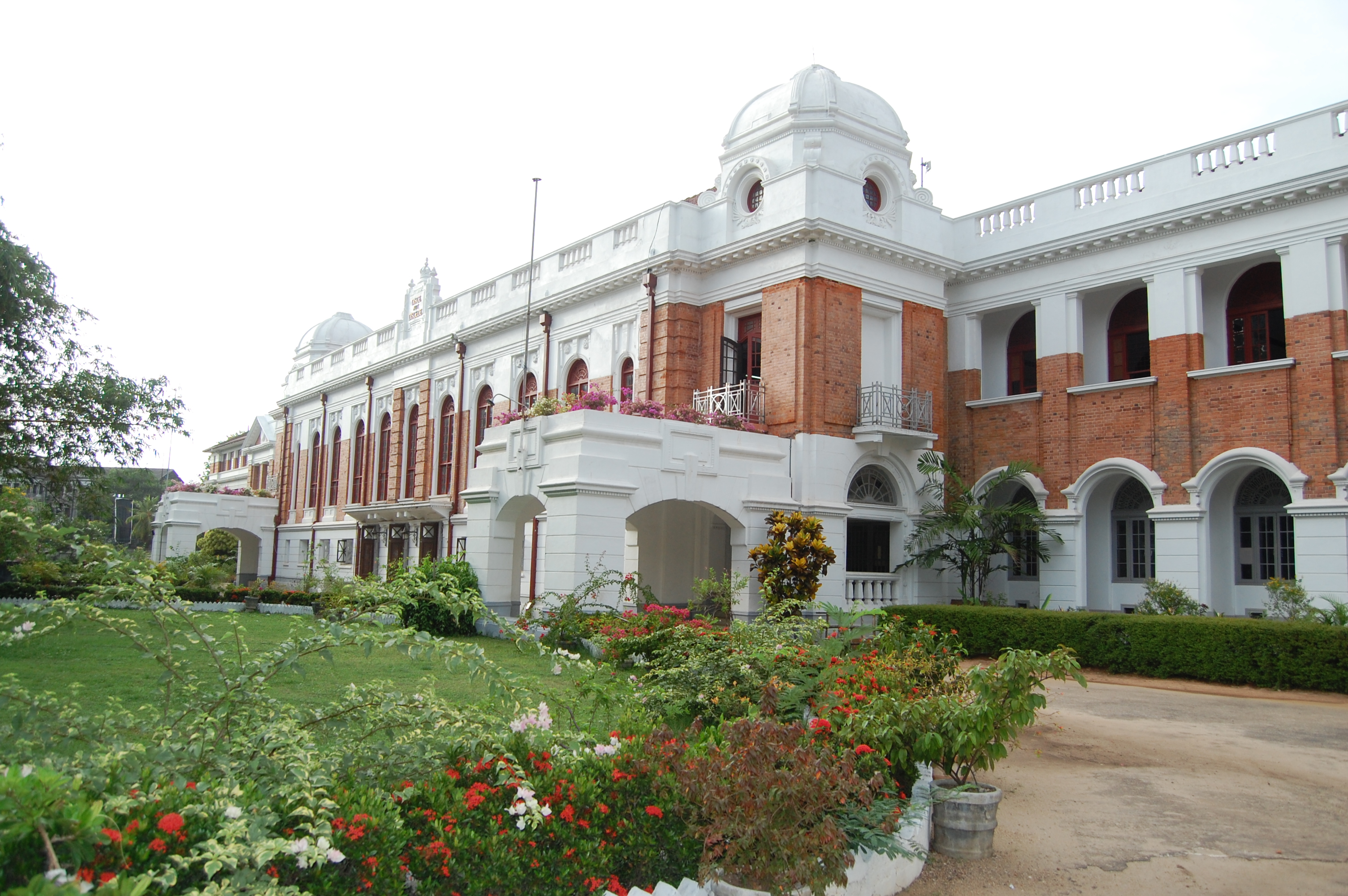
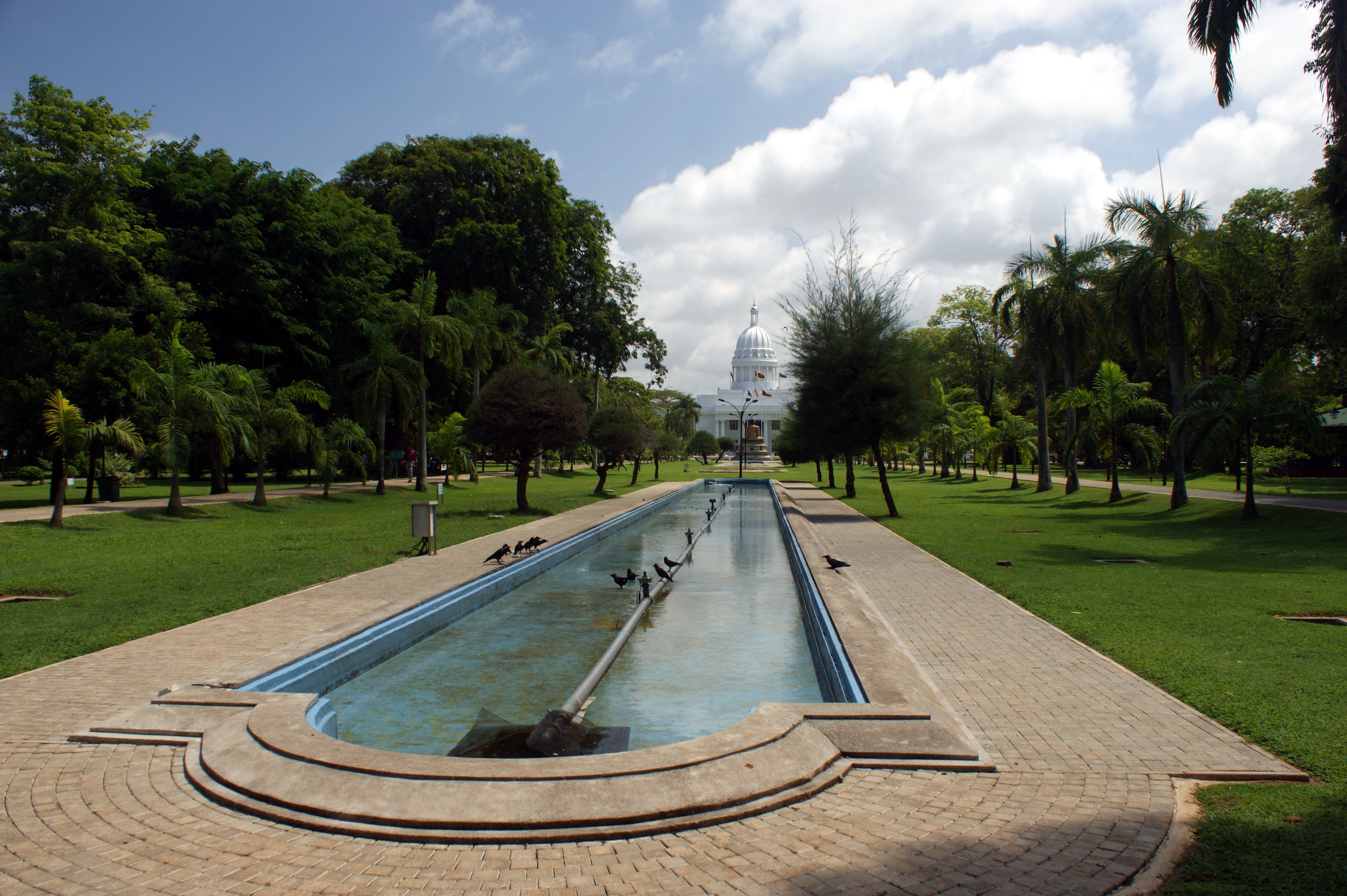
- From top left to right: Colombo Racecourse seen along Reid Avenue, Independence Memorial Hall, Nelum Pokuna Mahinda Rajapaksa Theatre, Bandaranaike Memorial International Conference Hall, Arcade Independence Square, Royal College, Viharamahadevi Park looking towards the Colombo Municipal Council

- Location in Location in Greater Colombo
- Coordinates: 6°54′24″N 79°51′48″E
- Country: Sri Lanka
- Province: Western Province
- District: Colombo District
- Time zone: UTC+5:30 (Sri Lanka Standard Time Zone)
- Postal Code: 00700

Cinnamon Gardens (Sinhala: කුරුඳු වත්ත Kurundu Watte, Tamil: கறுவாத் தோட்டம்) is an affluent neighbourhood in Colombo, Sri Lanka located 3 kilometers south-east of Colombo's centre. Cinnamon Gardens is named for the former cinnamon plantation in this area. In the year 1789, there were 289 acres (1.17 km^{2}) of cinnamon trees in the gardens.

At present, Cinnamon Gardens is the location of the Prime Minister's Office, Independence Hall, Colombo Town Hall and National Museum as well as numerous foreign embassies and high commissions, located down streets lined with fine trees and mansions that are home to the country's elite.

It is also the location of the Colombo Department of Meteorology and its observatory.

== Demographic ==
Cinnamon Gardens is a multi-religious and multi-ethnic area. The major ethnic communities in Cinnamon Gardens are Sinhalese and Tamils. Ethnic minorities include Burghers and Sri Lankan Moors. Religions include Buddhism, Hinduism, Islam, Christianity and various other religions and beliefs to a lesser extent.

== Schools ==
- Bishop's College
- Buddhist Ladies' College
- Carey College
- Colombo International School
- D. S. Senanayake College
- Ladies' College
- Musaeus College
- Royal College Colombo
- Sirimavo Bandaranaike Vidyalaya
- St Bridget's Convent
- Thurstan College
- Wycherley International School
- Stafford International School

== Universities ==
- Colombo University
- Visual & Performing Arts University

== Sporting venues ==
- Sinhalese Sports Club Cricket Ground
- Royal College Sports Complex
- D.S. Senanayake College Sports Complex
- Thurstan College Cricket Grounds
- Bloomfield Cricket and Athletic Club
- Ceylonese Rugby & Football Club Grounds
- Colombo Cricket Club Ground
- Colombo Racecourse
- Nondescripts Cricket Club

== Buildings ==
- Lighthouse
- Jefferson House
- Arcade Independence Square

== Places of interest ==
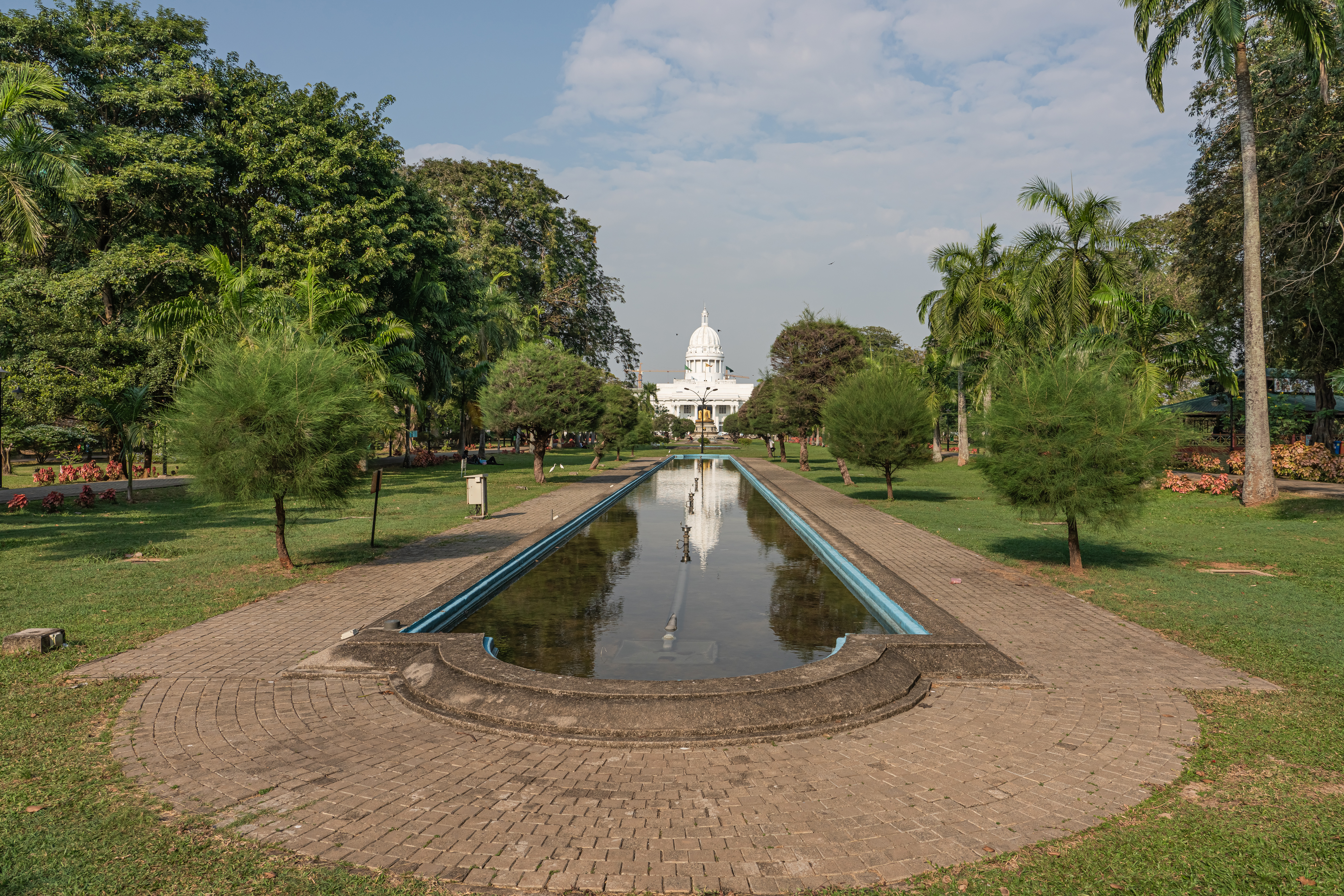
Viharamahadevi Park entrance.

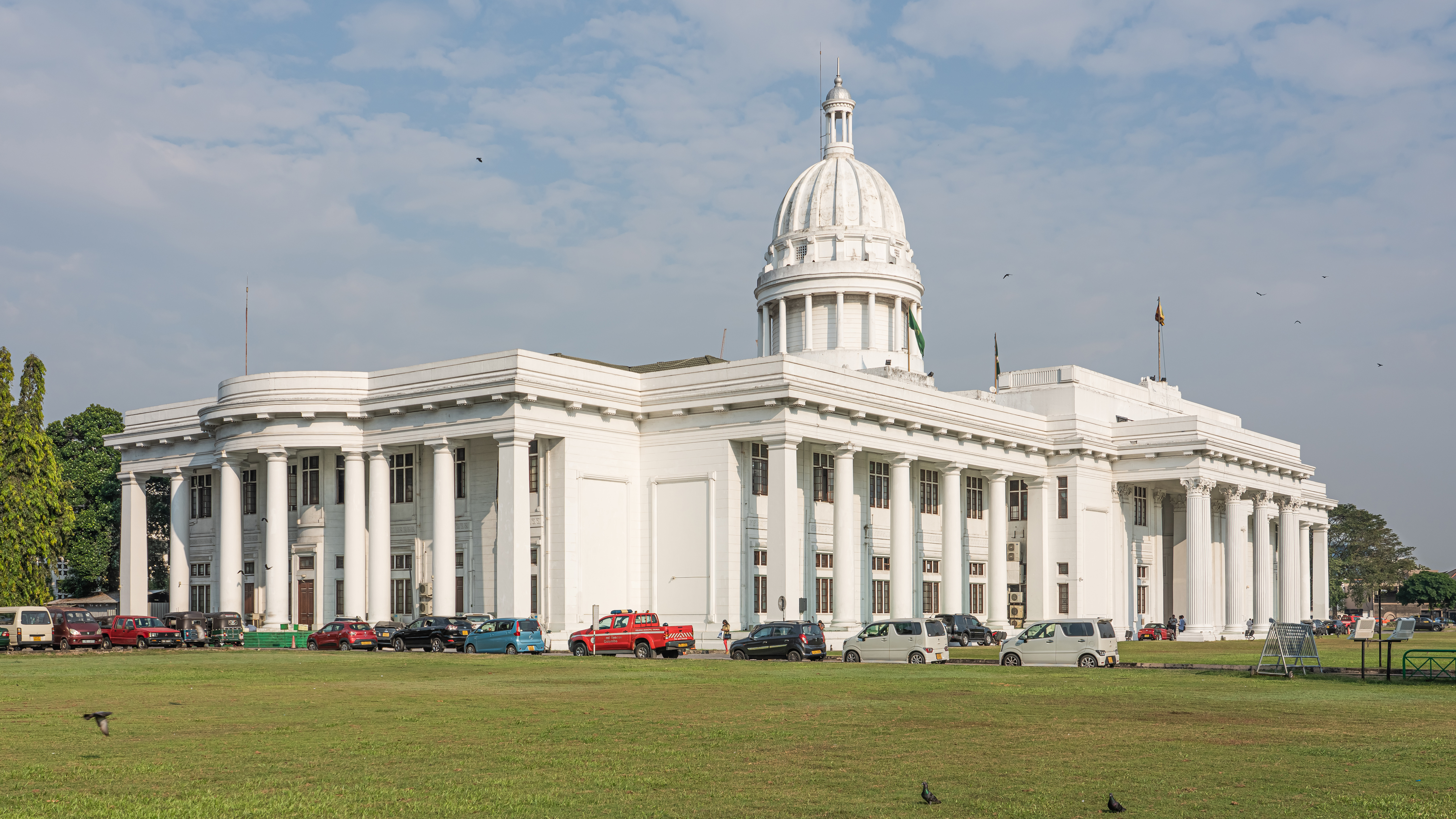
Colombo Municipal Council (Town Hall)

- National Museum of Colombo
- Viharamahadevi Park
- Nelum Pokuna Mahinda Rajapaksa Theatre
- SSC Cricket Ground
- Colombo Race Course
- Arcade Independence Square
- Independence Square
- Colombo Municipal Council
- Colombo public Library
- BMICH
- Planetarium
- National Art Gallery
- World War Memorial Park
- Lionel Wendt Art Centre

== Diplomatic missions ==
- High Commission of Australia
- High Commission of Canada
- Embassy of Netherlands
- High Commission of South Africa
- Embassy of Iran
- Embassy of China
- Embassy of Vietnam
- Embassy of Qatar
- Embassy of France
- Embassy of Indonesia
- Embassy of Japan
- Embassy of Kuwait
- Embassy of Myanmar
- Embassy of Pakistan
- Embassy of Romania
- Embassy of the Russian Federation
- Embassy of Saudi Arabia
- Embassy of Switzerland
- Embassy of the United Arab Emirates
- High Commission of the United Kingdom
- Embassy of Thailand
- High Commission of Bangladesh
- Embassy of the Federative Republic of Brazil
- Embassy of Libya
- Embassy of South Korea
- Consulate of Poland
- Consulate of Bulgaria

== Gallery ==
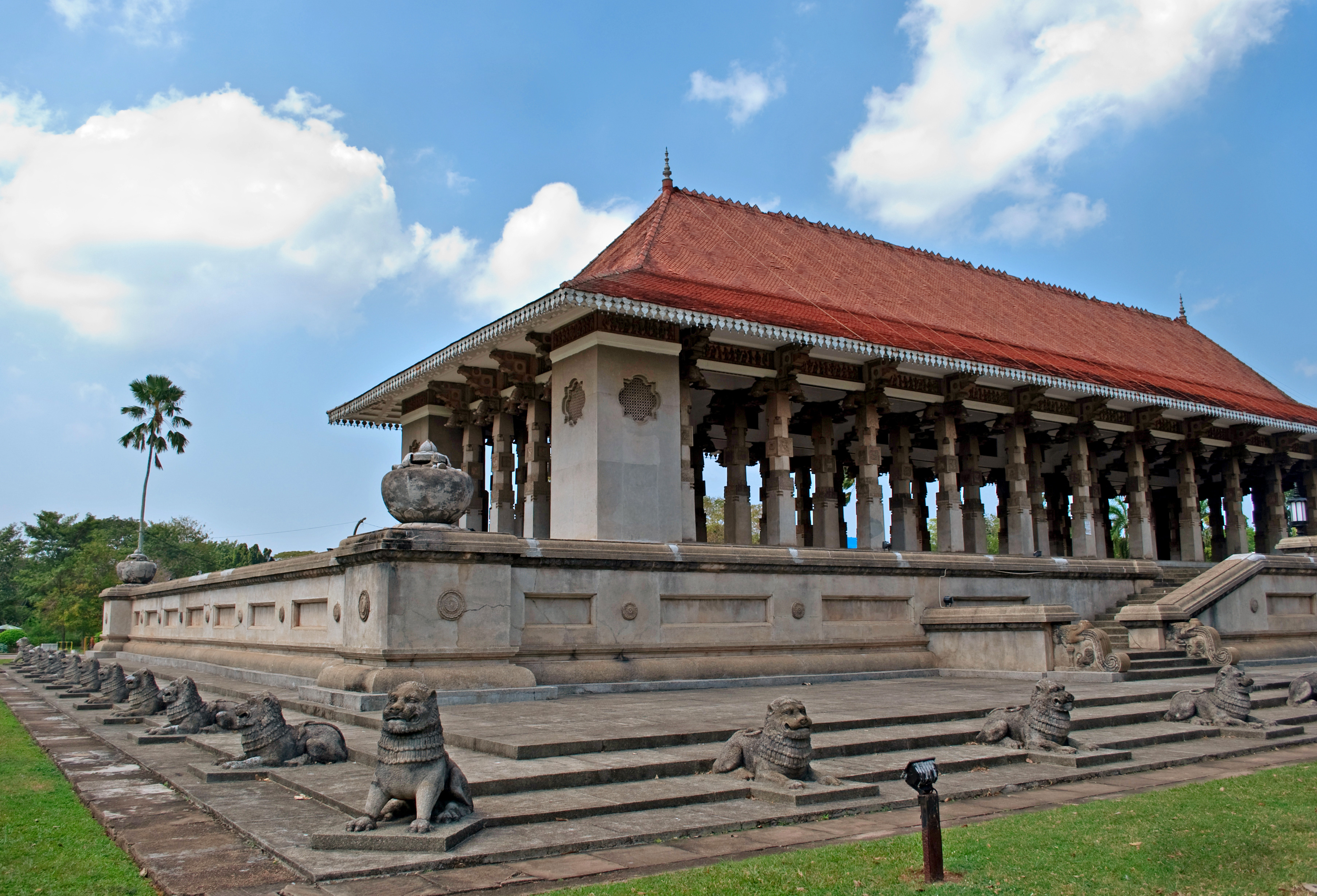
Independence Hall

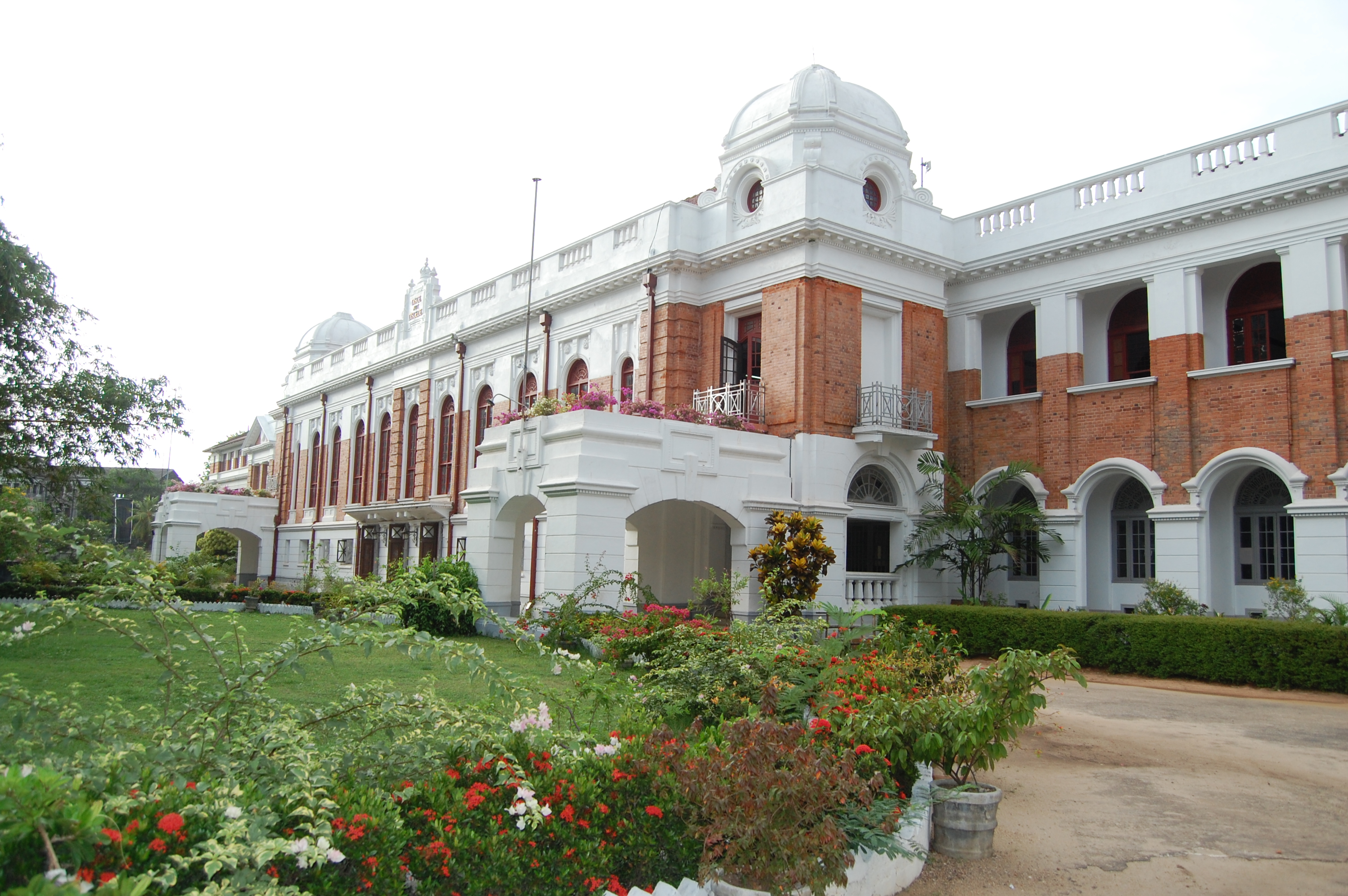
Royal College Colombo

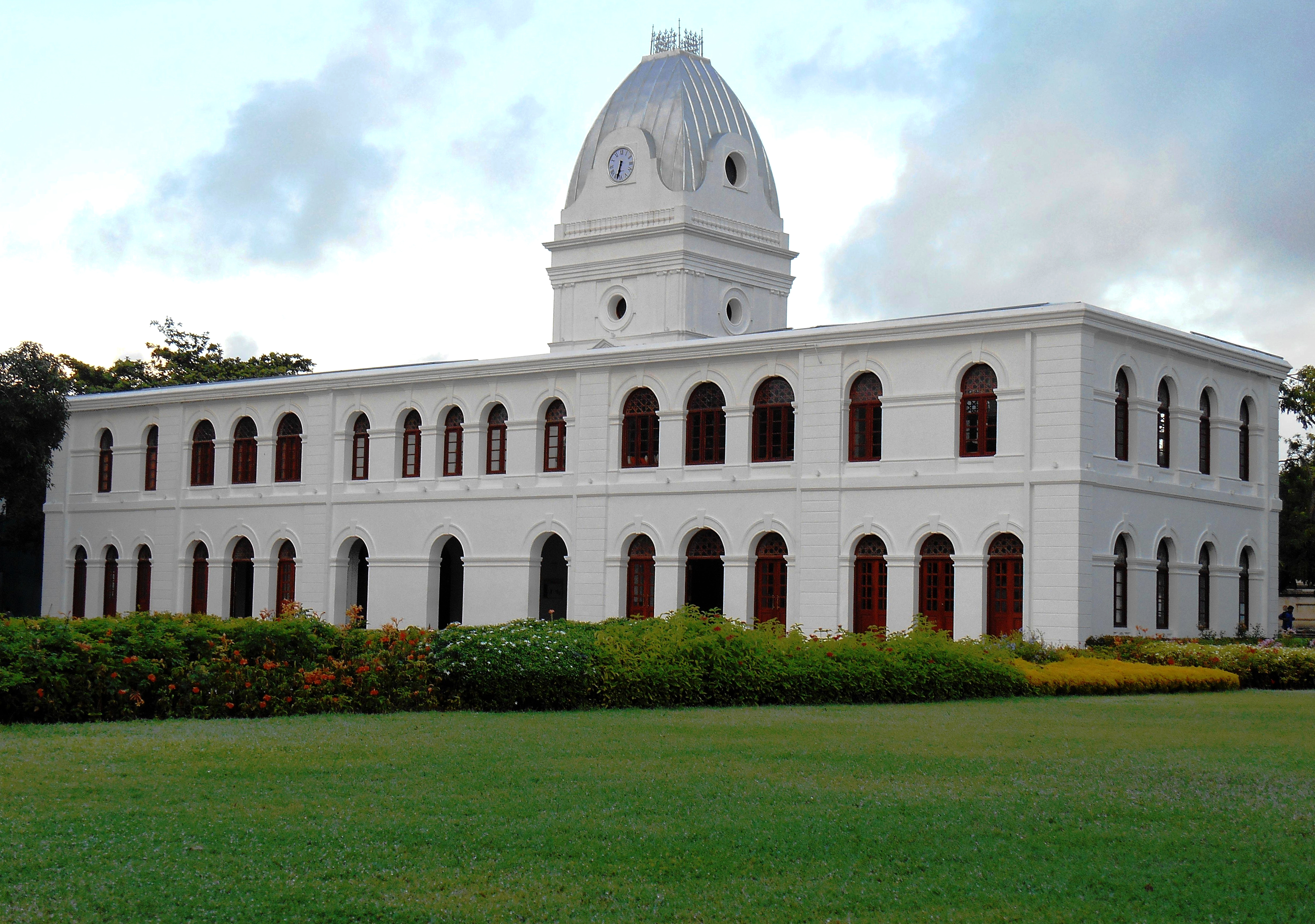
Arcade Independence Square

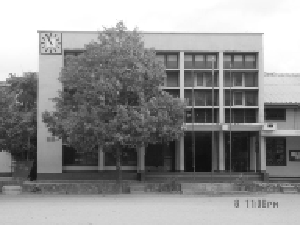
Thurstan College Colombo

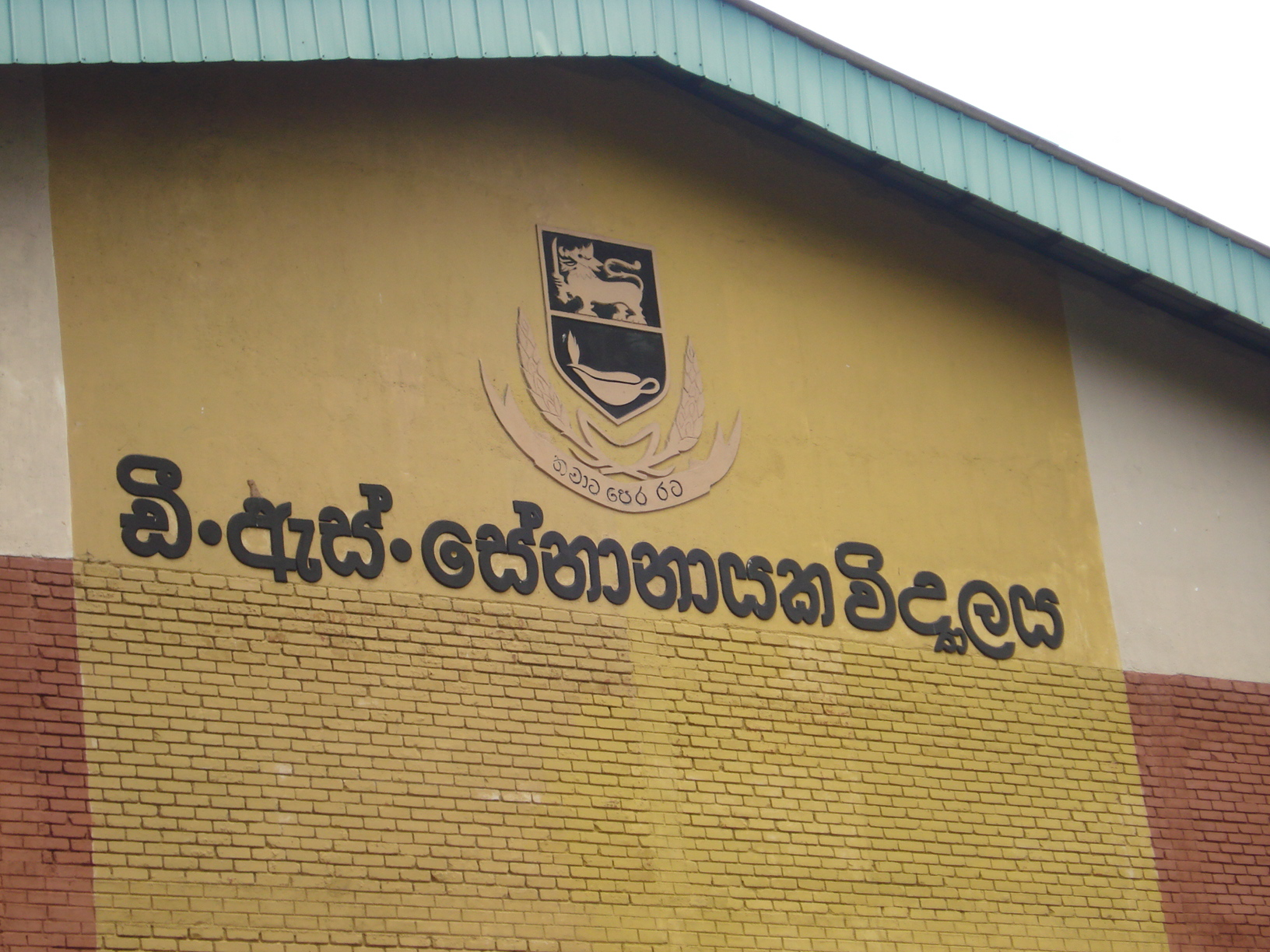
D. S. Senanayake College

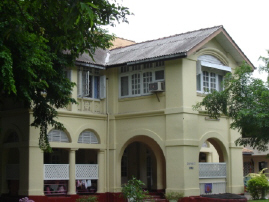
Sirimavo Bandaranaike Vidyalaya

== See also ==
- Rajakeeya Mawatha
- Kumarathunga Munidasa Mawatha
