= Sri Lanka Planetarium =

Public planetarium located in Colombo

- ශ්‍රී ලංකා ග්‍රහලෝකාගාරය
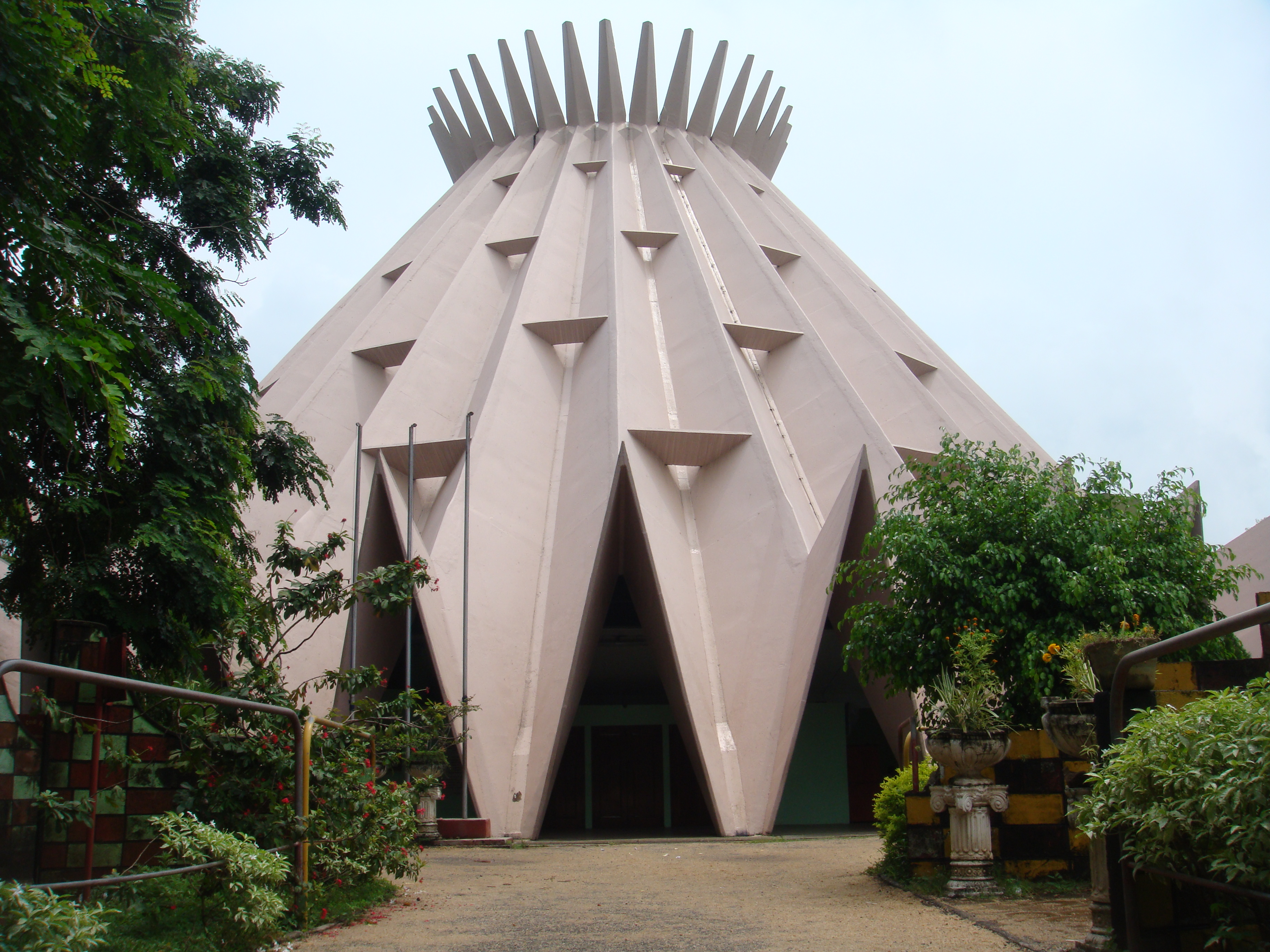
- Established: 1 February 1965; 61 years ago
- Location: Prof. Stanley Wijesundaran Mawatha, Colombo 7, Sri Lanka.
- Type: Planetarium
- Director: K. Arunu Perera
- Architect: A. N. S. Kulasinghe
- Website: www.planetarium.gov.lk

Sri Lanka Planetarium (Sinhala: ශ්‍රී ලංකා ග්‍රහලෝකාගාරය) is a public planetarium located in Colombo, Sri Lanka. It is the first and only planetarium in the country and maintained as an institute under the Ministry of Science, Technology and Research.

The planetarium was established on 1 February 1965 by the State Engineering Corporation as a special feature for the Ceylon industrial exhibition held in Colombo same year. The planetarium was designed by the chief engineer from the State Engineering Corporation of Ceylon, A. N. S. Kulasinghe, and was constructed by engineers from Germany. The building takes elements from the Liverpool Metropolitan Cathedral (Sir Frederick Gibberd - 1960) and the Cathedral of Brasília (Oscar Niemeyer - 1960). The building has a reinforced concrete floor and a pre-stressed concrete folded plate roof, which was pre-cast on-site. The building was funded by the German Democratic Republic as a gift to Ceylon. The planetarium is 21.33 m (70.0 ft) high and 37.8 m (124 ft) in diameter.

The building was refurbished in 2014 at a cost of Rs 200 million and re-opened to the public on 9 December.

The planetarium has a digital fully-spherical projector stationed at the centre of the building, which projects an artificial sky on the 23 m (75 ft) diameter dome above a 570-seat auditorium. The universal projector is a product of Carl Zeiss AG East Germany.
