= List of diplomatic missions of Qatar =

This is a list of diplomatic missions of Qatar. Qatar gained its independence in 1971, established its Ministry of Foreign Affairs and has since developed a diplomatic presence internationally.

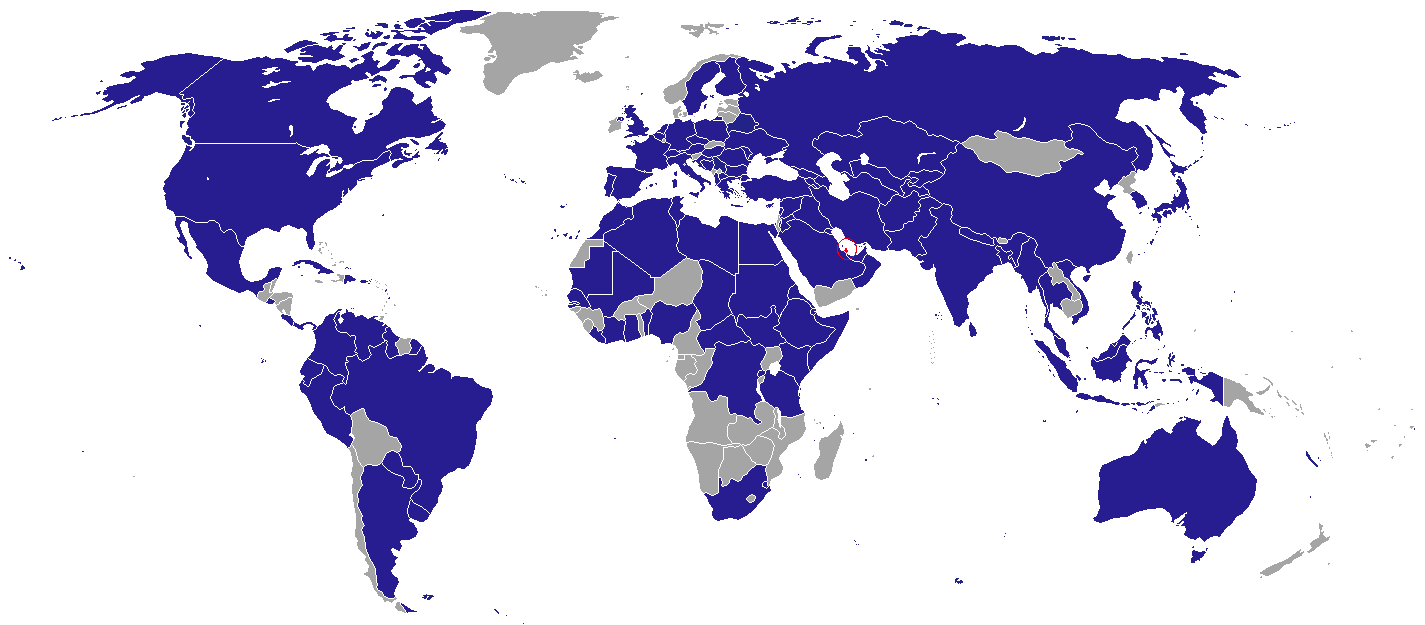
Diplomatic missions of Qatar

== Current missions ==
=== Africa ===
| Host country | Host city | Mission | Concurrent accreditation | Ref. |
|---|---|---|---|---|
| Algeria | Algiers | Embassy | | |
| Benin | Cotonou | Embassy | Countries: Burkina Faso; Togo | |
| Central African Republic | Bangui | Embassy | | |
| Chad | N'Djamena | Embassy | | |
| Congo-Kinshasa | Kinshasa | Embassy | | |
| Djibouti | Djibouti City | Embassy | | |
| Egypt | Cairo | Embassy | Multilateral Organizations: Arab League | |
| Eritrea | Asmara | Embassy | | |
| Eswatini | Bamako | Embassy | Countries: Mauritius; Mozambique | |
| Ethiopia | Addis Ababa | Embassy | Multilateral Organizations: African Union; United Nations Economic Commission for Africa | |
| Gambia | Banjul | Embassy | | |
| Ghana | Abidjan | Accra | | |
| Ivory Coast | Abidjan | Embassy | | |
| Kenya | Nairobi | Embassy | Countries: Seychelles; Multilateral Organizations: United Nations; United Nations Environment Programme; United Nations Human Settlements Programme | |
| Liberia | Monrovia | Embassy | | |
| Libya | Tripoli | Embassy | | |
| Mali | Bamako | Embassy | Countries: Niger | |
| Mauritania | Nouakchott | Embassy | | |
| Morocco | Rabat | Embassy | | |
| Nigeria | Abuja | Embassy | Countries: Cameroon; Gabon; São Tomé and Príncipe | |
| Rwanda | Kigali | Embassy | | |
| Senegal | Dakar | Embassy | Countries: Guinea; Guinea-Bissau | |
| South Africa | Pretoria | Embassy | Countries: Angola; Botswana; Lesotho; Namibia; Zimbabwe | |
| Somalia | Mogadishu | Embassy | | |
| Sudan | Khartoum | Embassy | | |
| Tanzania | Dar es Salaam | Embassy | Countries: Burundi; Malawi | |
| Tunisia | Tunis | Embassy | | |
| Uganda | Kampala | Embassy | | |

=== Americas ===
| Host country | Host city | Mission | Concurrent accreditation | Ref. |
|---|---|---|---|---|
| Argentina | Buenos Aires | Embassy | Countries: Chile | |
| Brazil | Brasília | Embassy | Countries: Suriname | |
| Brazil | São Paulo | Consulate-General | Countries: Suriname | |
| Canada | Ottawa | Embassy | | |
| Colombia | Bogotá | Embassy | | |
| Costa Rica | San José | Embassy | | |
| Cuba | Havana | Embassy | | |
| Dominican Republic | Santo Domingo | Embassy | Countries: Antigua and Barbuda; Dominica; Haiti; Saint Kitts and Nevis; Saint Vincent and the Grenadines | |
| Ecuador | Quito | Embassy | | |
| El Salvador | San Salvador | Embassy | Countries: Belize; Guatemala; Honduras | |
| Guyana | Georgetown | Embassy | | |
| Mexico | Mexico City | Embassy | | |
| Panama | Panama City | Embassy | | |
| Paraguay | Asunción | Embassy | | |
| Peru | Lima | Embassy | Countries: Bolivia | |
| United States | Washington, D.C. | Embassy | Multilateral Organizations: Organization of American States | |
| United States | Houston | Consulate-General | Multilateral Organizations: Organization of American States | |
| United States | Los Angeles | Consulate-General | Multilateral Organizations: Organization of American States | |
| United States | New York City | Consulate-General | Multilateral Organizations: Organization of American States | |
| Uruguay | Montevideo | Embassy | | |
| Venezuela | Caracas | Embassy | Countries: Barbados; Grenada; Saint Lucia; Saint Vincent and the Grenadines; Trinidad and Tobago | |

=== Asia ===
| Host country | Host city | Mission | Concurrent accreditation | Ref. |
|---|---|---|---|---|
| Afghanistan | Kabul | Embassy | | |
| Armenia | Yerevan | Embassy | | |
| Azerbaijan | Baku | Embassy | | |
| Bahrain | Manama | Embassy | | |
| Bangladesh | Dhaka | Embassy | | |
| Brunei | Bandar Seri Begawan | Embassy | | |
| China | Beijing | Embassy | Countries: Mongolia; North Korea | |
| China | Guangzhou | Consulate-General | Countries: Mongolia; North Korea | |
| China | Hong Kong | Consulate-General | Countries: Mongolia; North Korea | |
| China | Shanghai | Consulate-General | Countries: Mongolia; North Korea | |
| Georgia | Tbilisi | Embassy | | |
| India | New Delhi | Embassy | Countries: Bhutan | |
| India | Mumbai | Consulate-General | Countries: Bhutan | |
| Indonesia | Jakarta | Embassy | Countries: Papua New Guinea; Timor-Leste; Multilateral Organizations: Association of Southeast Asian Nations | |
| Iran | Tehran | Embassy | | |
| Iraq | Baghdad | Embassy | | |
| Iraq | Erbil | Consulate-General | | |
| Japan | Tokyo | Embassy | | |
| Jordan | Amman | Embassy | | |
| Kazakhstan | Astana | Embassy | | |
| Kuwait | Kuwait City | Embassy | | |
| Kyrgyzstan | Bishkek | Embassy | | |
| Lebanon | Beirut | Embassy | | |
| Malaysia | Putrajaya | Embassy | | |
| Myanmar | Yangon | Embassy | | |
| Nepal | Kathmandu | Embassy | | |
| Oman | Muscat | Embassy | | |
| Pakistan | Islamabad | Embassy | | |
| Pakistan | Karachi | Consulate-General | | |
| Philippines | Manila | Embassy | Countries: Palau | |
| Saudi Arabia | Riyadh | Embassy | | |
| Saudi Arabia | Jeddah | Consulate-General | | |
| Singapore | Singapore | Embassy | | |
| South Korea | Seoul | Embassy | | |
| Sri Lanka | Colombo | Embassy | Countries: Maldives | |
| Syria | Damascus | Embassy | | |
| Tajikistan | Dushanbe | Embassy | | |
| Thailand | Bangkok | Embassy | Countries: Laos | |
| Turkey | Ankara | Embassy | | |
| Turkey | Istanbul | Consulate-General | | |
| Turkmenistan | Ashgabat | Embassy | | |
| United Arab Emirates | Abu Dhabi | Embassy | Multilateral Organizations: International Renewable Energy Agency | |
| United Arab Emirates | Dubai | Consulate-General | Multilateral Organizations: International Renewable Energy Agency | |
| Uzbekistan | Tashkent | Embassy | | |
| Vietnam | Hanoi | Embassy | Countries: Cambodia | |

=== Europe ===
| Host country | Host city | Mission | Concurrent accreditation | Ref. |
|---|---|---|---|---|
| Albania | Tirana | Embassy | Countries: Kosovo | |
| Austria | Vienna | Embassy | Countries: Slovakia; Slovenia | |
| Belarus | Minsk | Embassy | | |
| Belgium | Brussels | Embassy | Countries: Luxembourg | |
| Bosnia and Herzegovina | Sarajevo | Embassy | | |
| Bulgaria | Sofia | Embassy | | |
| Croatia | Zagreb | Embassy | Countries: Holy See | |
| Cyprus | Nicosia | Embassy | | |
| Czechia | Prague | Embassy | | |
| Finland | Helsinki | Embassy | Countries: Estonia | |
| France | Paris | Embassy | Countries: Monaco | |
| Germany | Berlin | Embassy | | |
| Germany | Bonn | Embassy extension office | | |
| Germany | Munich | Consulate-General | | |
| Greece | Athens | Embassy | | |
| Malta | Valletta (Note: Although officially titled as an embassy in Valletta, its chancery is physically located in the nearby town of Swieqi.) | Embassy | | |
| Hungary | Budapest | Embassy | | |
| Italy | Rome | Embassy | Countries: San Marino; Multilateral Organizations: Food and Agriculture Organization; International Fund for Agricultural Development; World Food Programme | |
| Italy | Milan | Consulate-General | Countries: San Marino; Multilateral Organizations: Food and Agriculture Organization; International Fund for Agricultural Development; World Food Programme | |
| Moldova | Chișinău | Embassy | | |
| Netherlands | The Hague | Embassy | Countries: Denmark; Multilateral Organizations: Organisation for the Prohibition of Chemical Weapons | |
| North Macedonia | Skopje | Embassy | | |
| Poland | Warsaw | Embassy | Countries: Latvia; Lithuania | |
| Portugal | Lisbon | Embassy | Countries: Cape Verde | |
| Romania | Bucharest | Embassy | | |
| Russia | Moscow | Embassy | | |
| Serbia | Belgrade | Embassy | Countries: Montenegro | |
| Spain | Madrid | Embassy | Countries: Andorra; Multilateral Organizations: UN Tourism | |
| Spain | Barcelona | Consulate-General | Countries: Andorra; Multilateral Organizations: UN Tourism | |
| Switzerland | Bern | Embassy | Countries: Liechtenstein | |
| Sweden | Stockholm | Embassy | Countries: Norway | |
| Ukraine | Kyiv | Embassy | | |
| United Kingdom | London | Embassy | Countries: Iceland; Ireland; Multilateral Organizations: International Maritime Organization | |

=== Oceania ===
| Host country | Host city | Mission | Concurrent accreditation | Ref. |
|---|---|---|---|---|
| Australia | Canberra | Embassy | Countries: Fiji; New Zealand; Solomon Islands | |

=== Multilateral organizations ===
| Organization | Host city | Host country | Mission | Concurrent accreditation | Ref. |
|---|---|---|---|---|---|
| European Union | Brussels | Belgium | Mission | Multilateral Organizations: NATO | |
| United Nations | New York | United States | Permanent Mission | | |
| United Nations | Geneva | Switzerland | Permanent Mission | | |

== Gallery ==
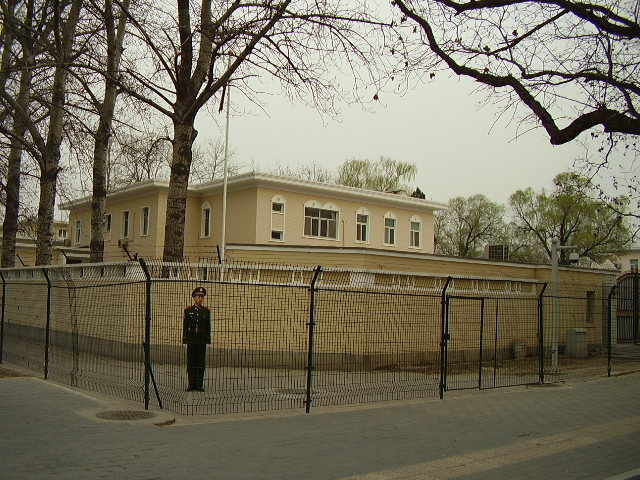
Embassy in Beijing

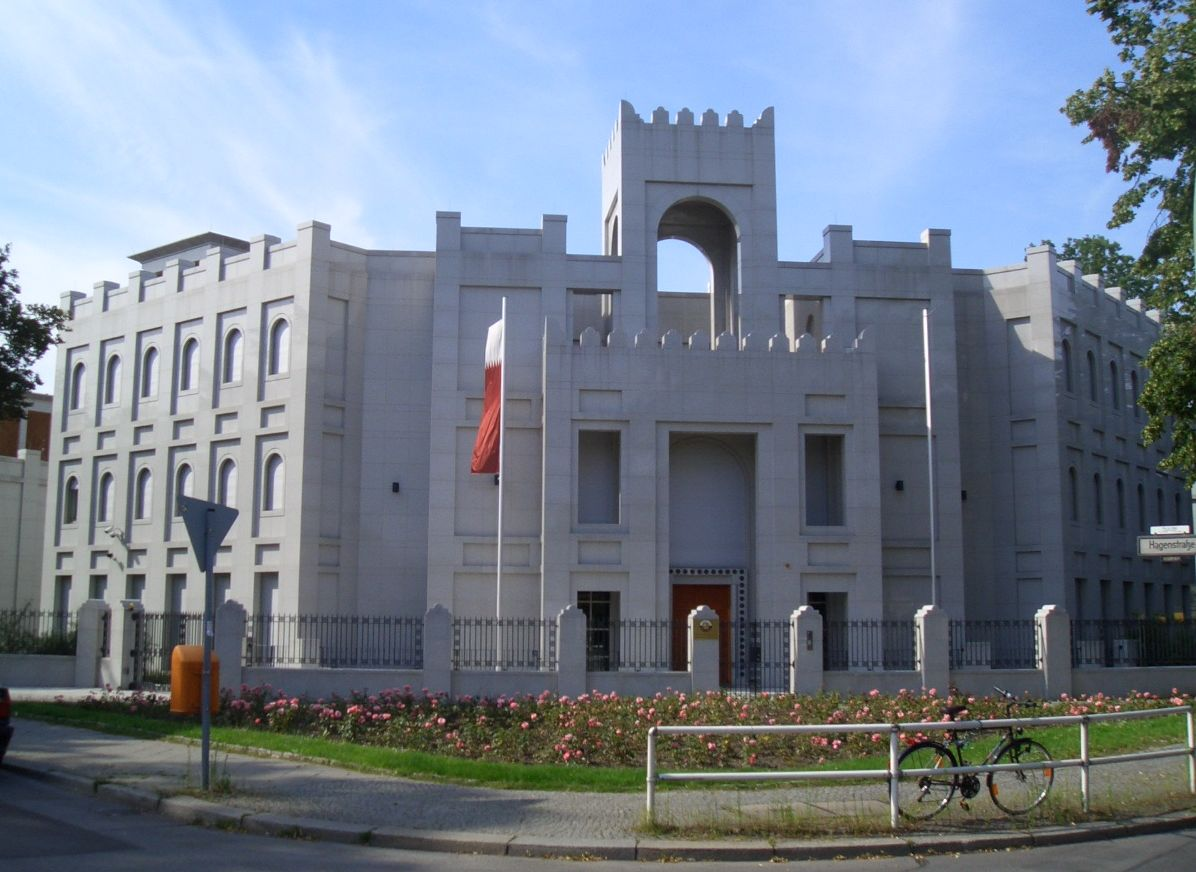
Embassy in Berlin

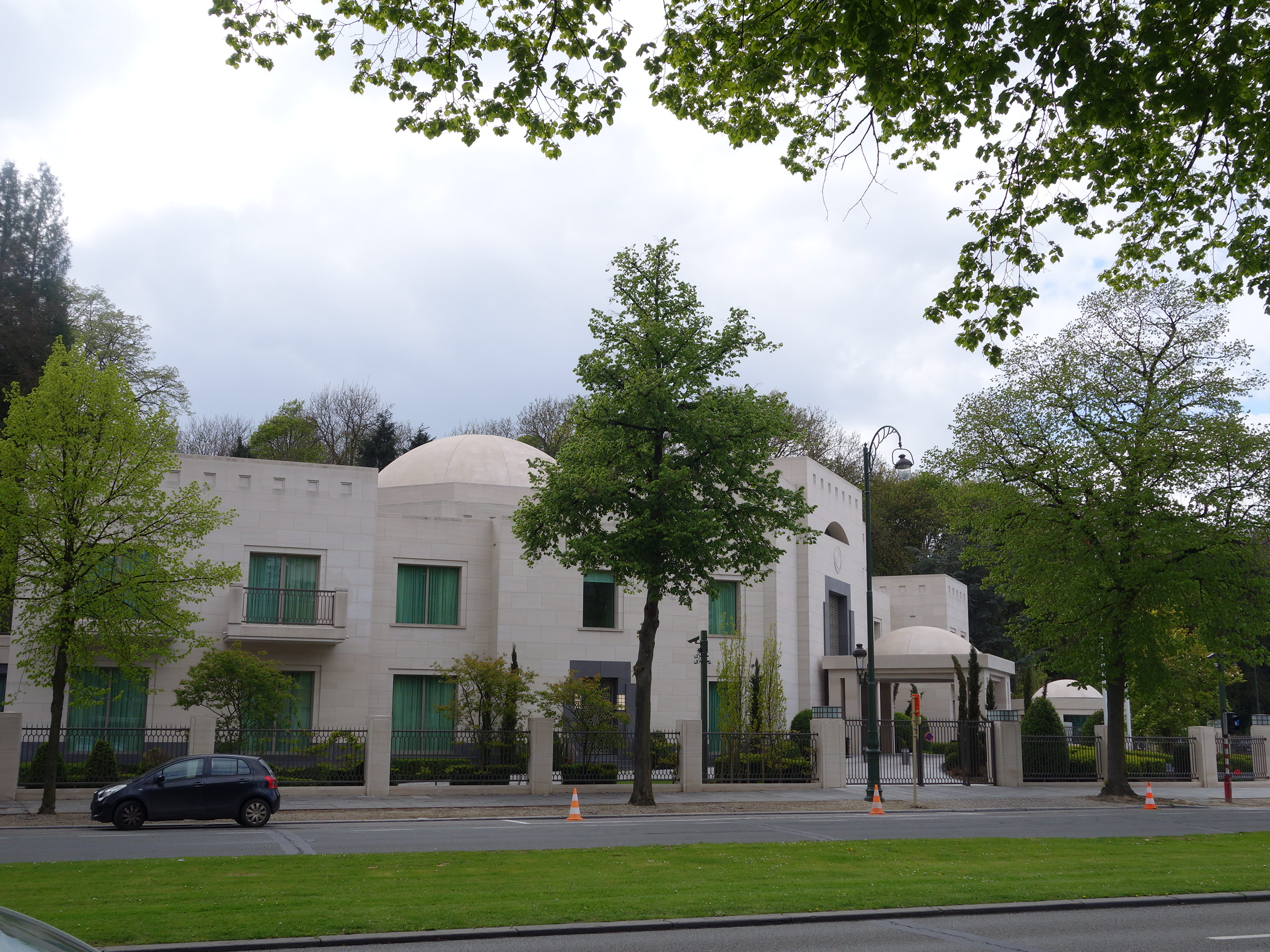
Embassy in Brussels

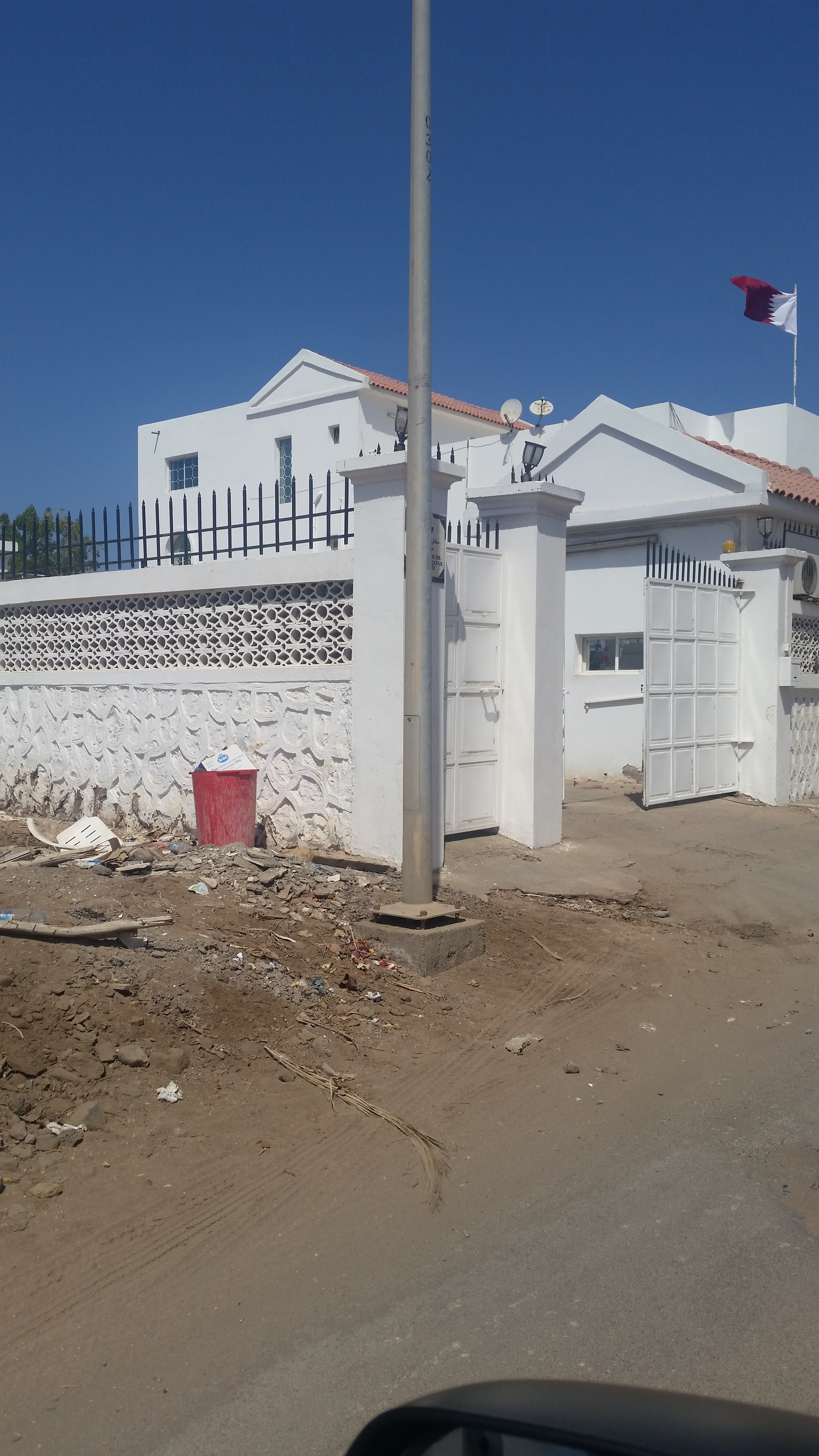
Embassy in Djibouti City

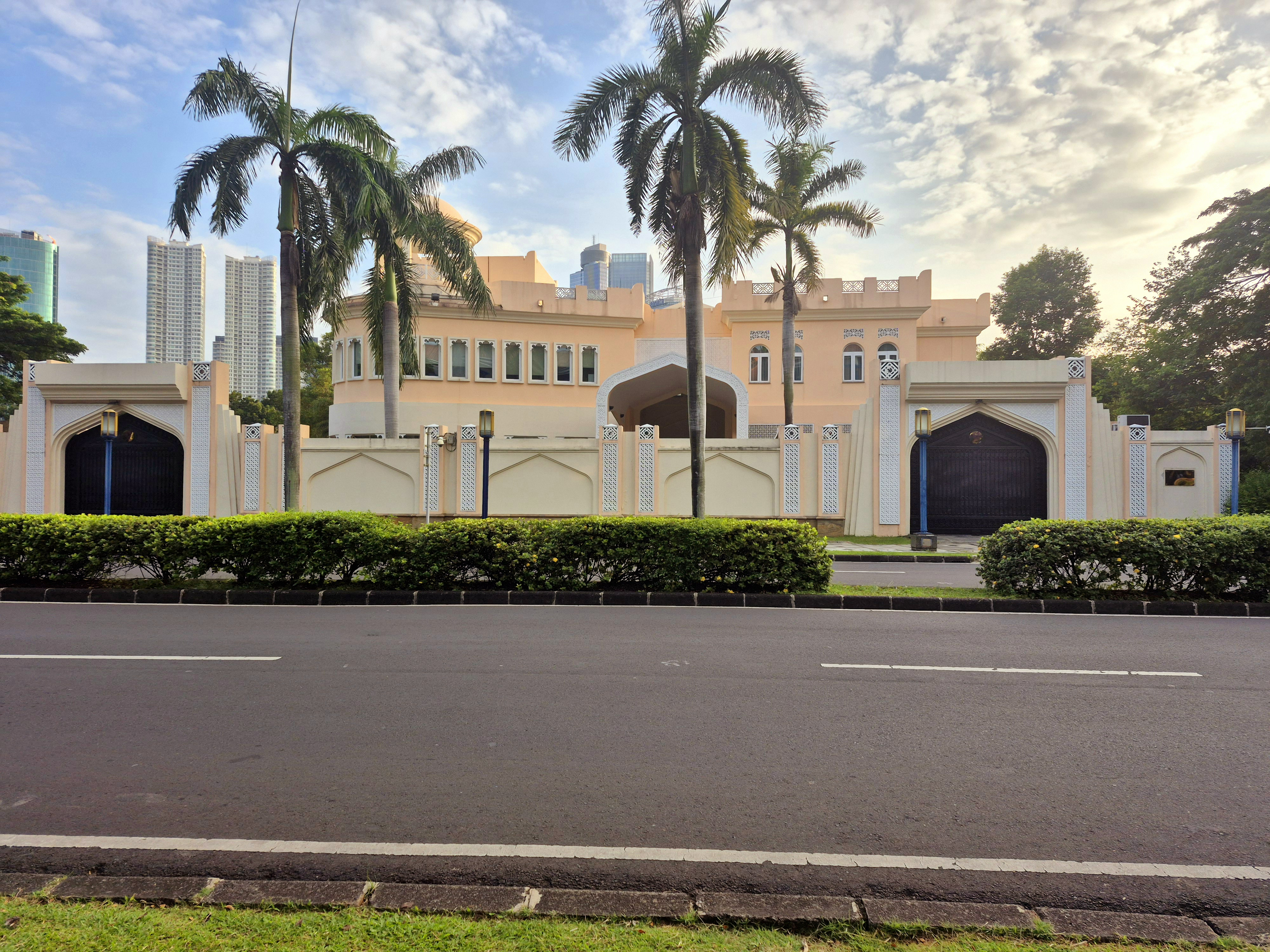
Embassy in Jakarta

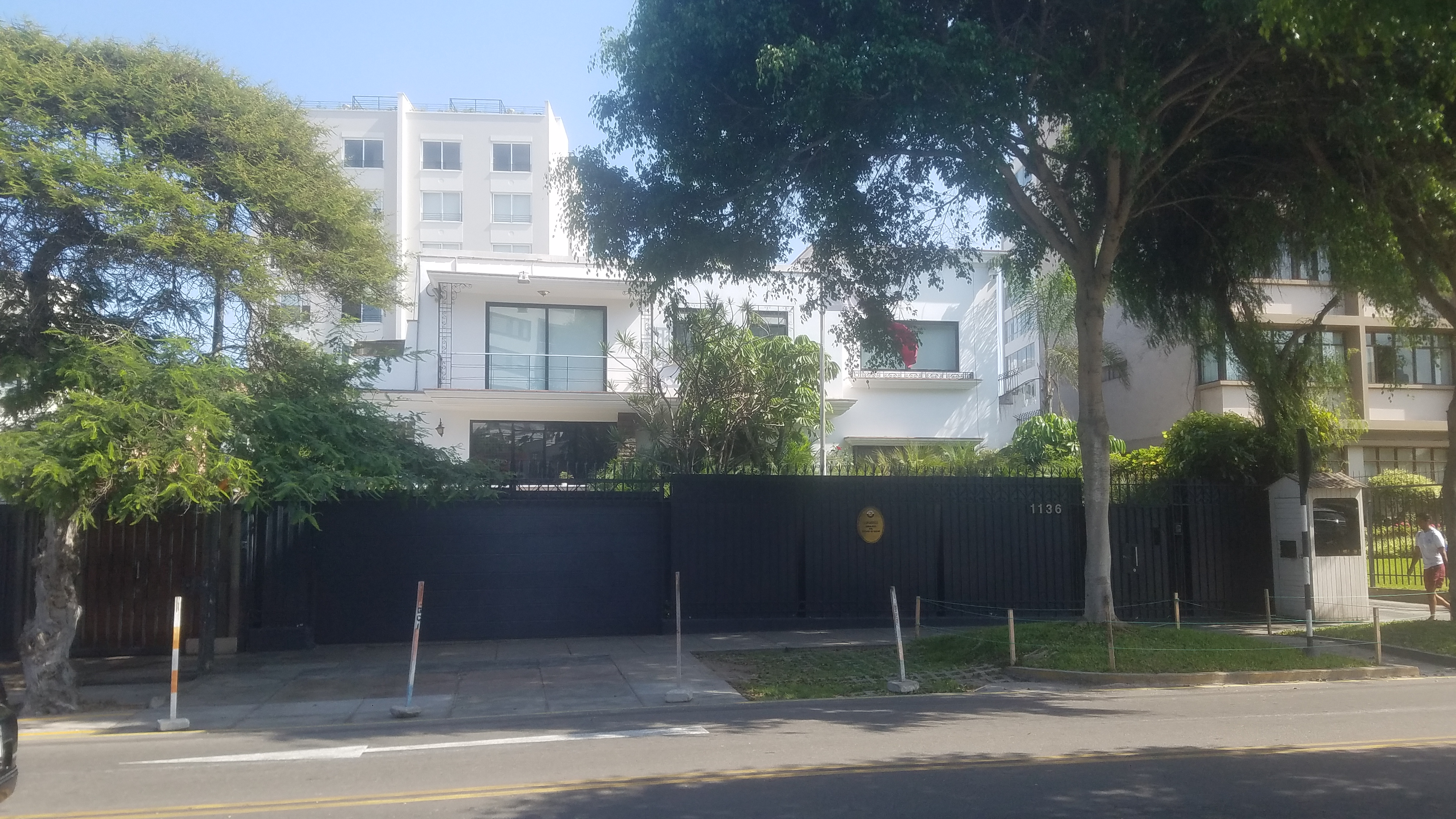
Embassy in Lima

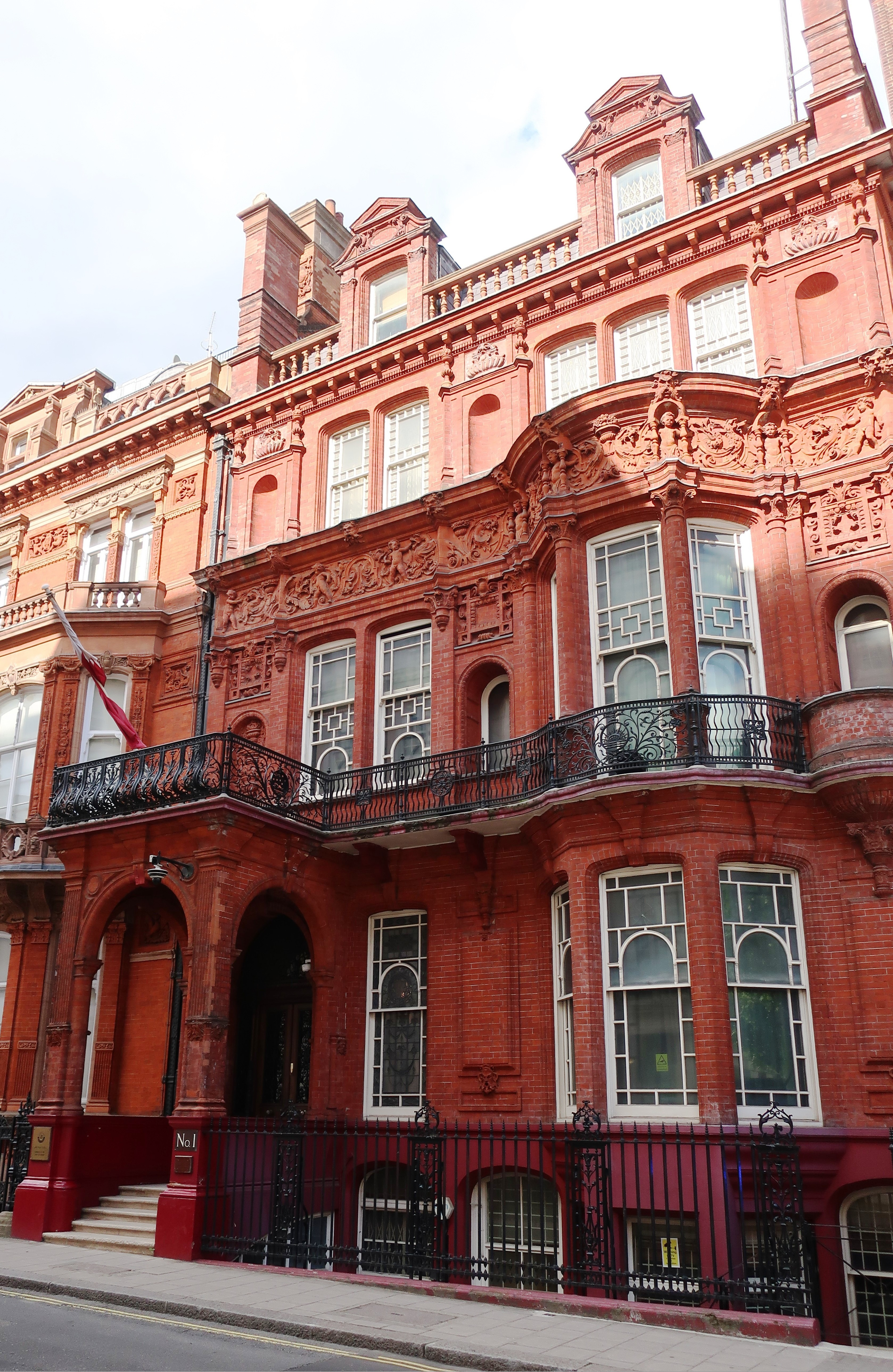
Embassy in London

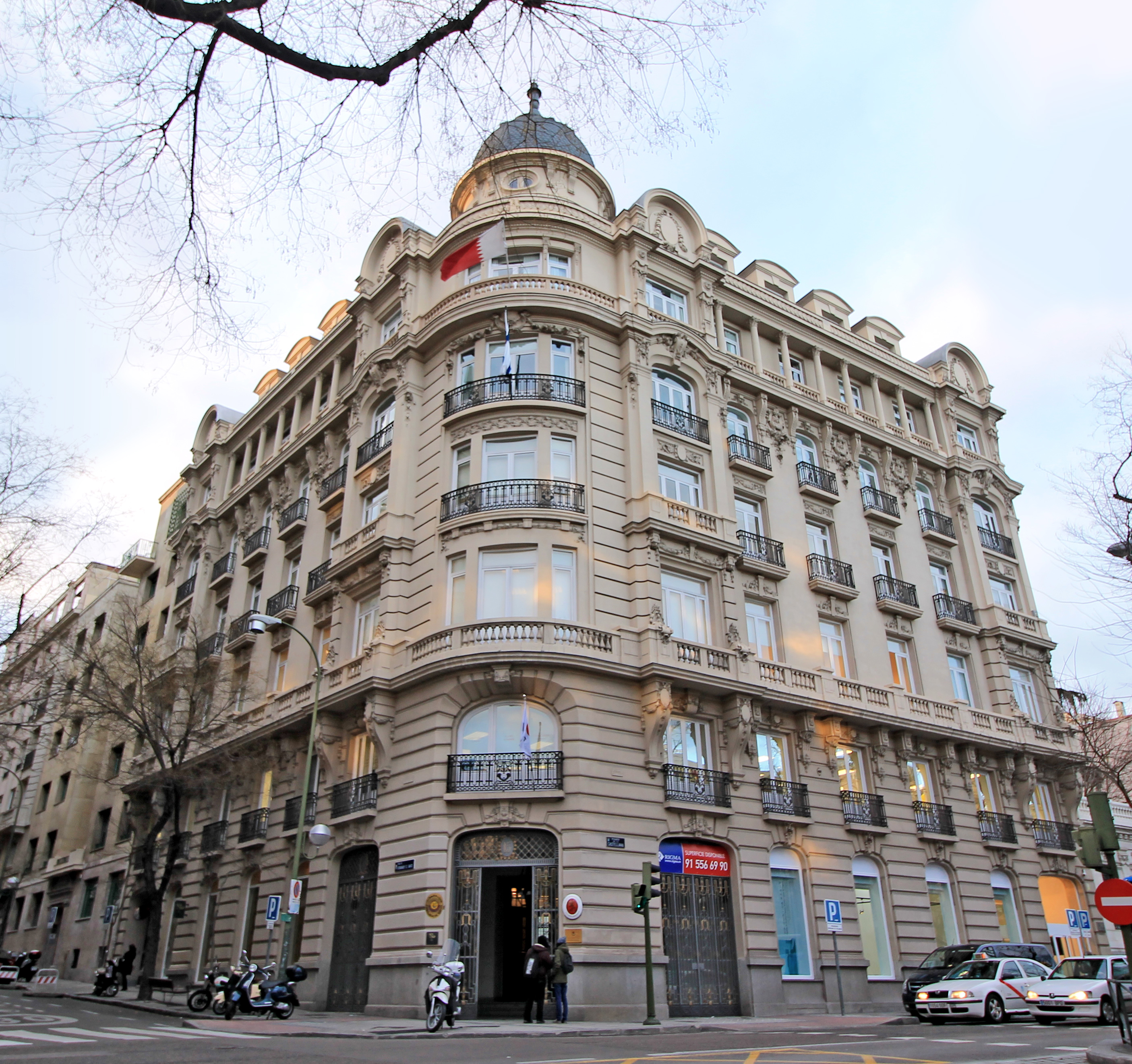
Embassy in Madrid

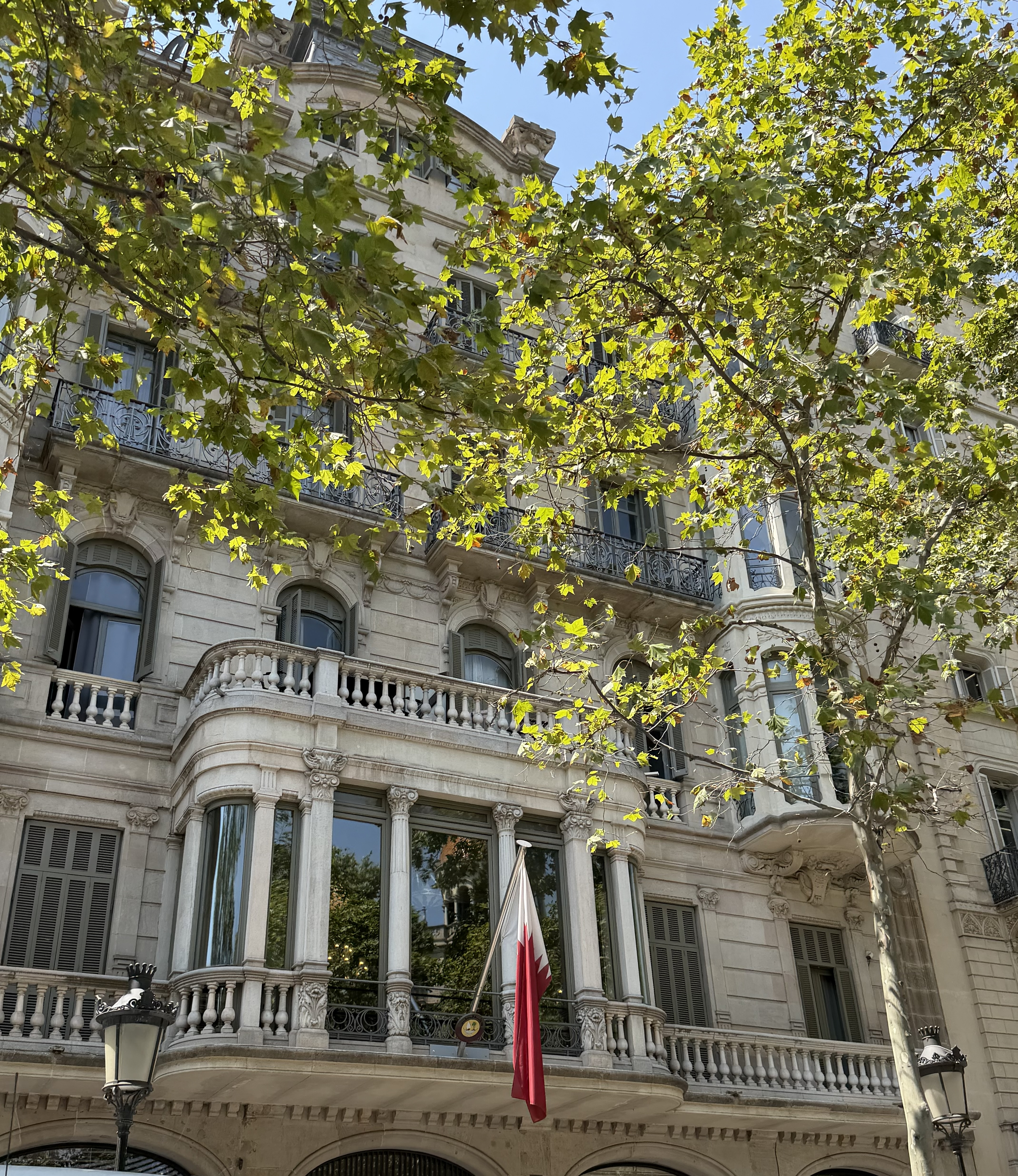
Consulate-General in Barcelona

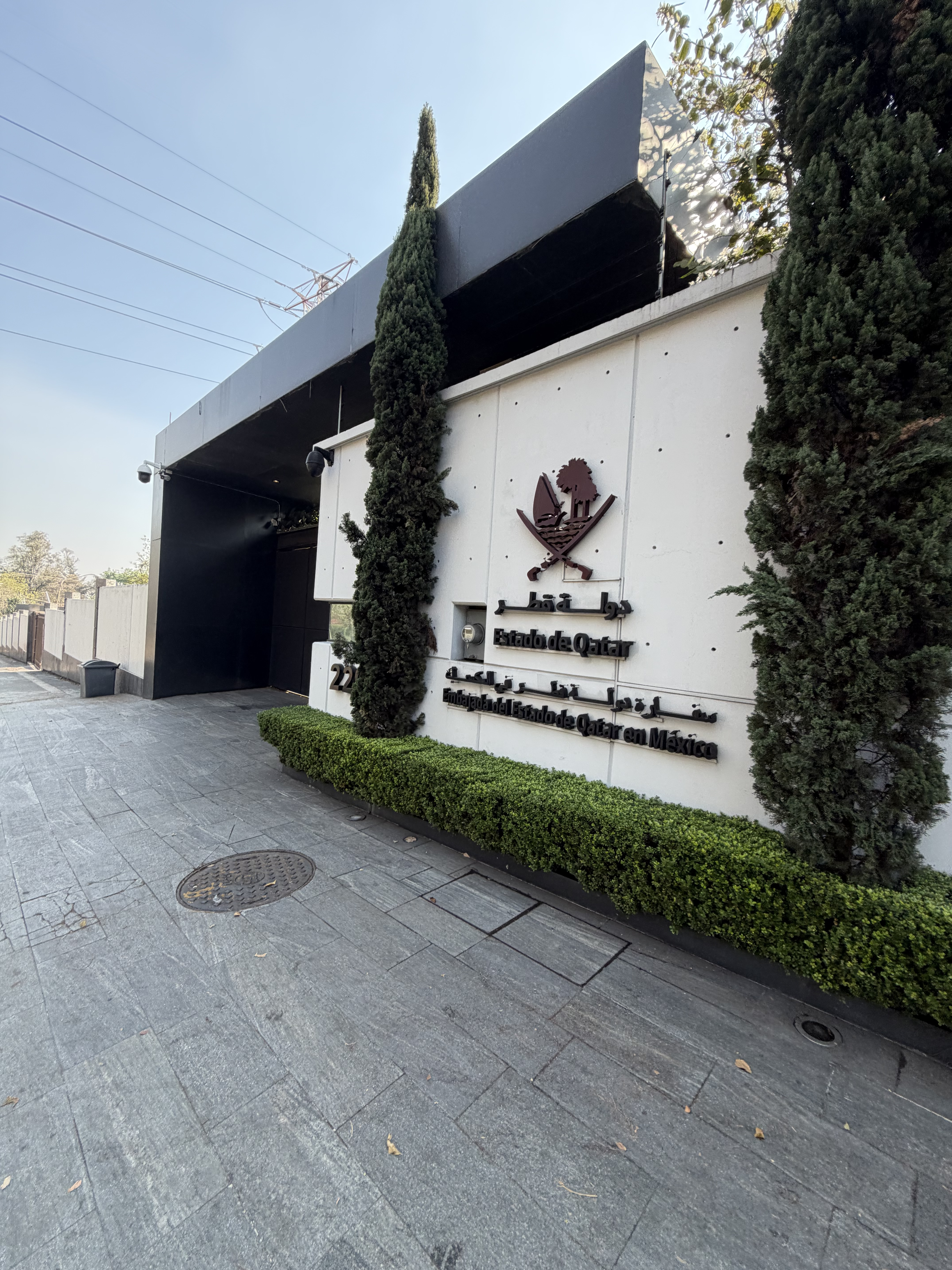
Embassy in Mexico City

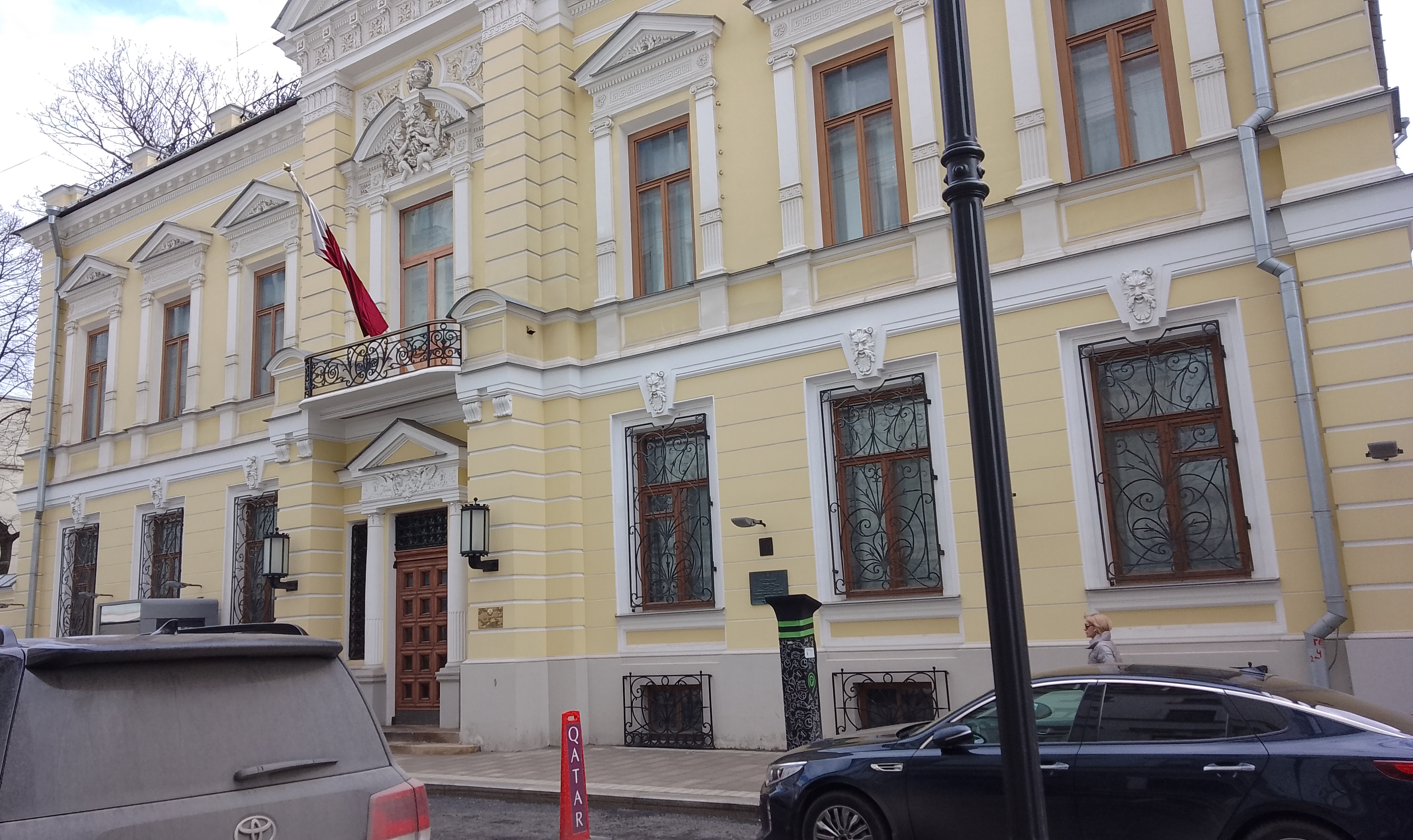
Embassy in Moscow

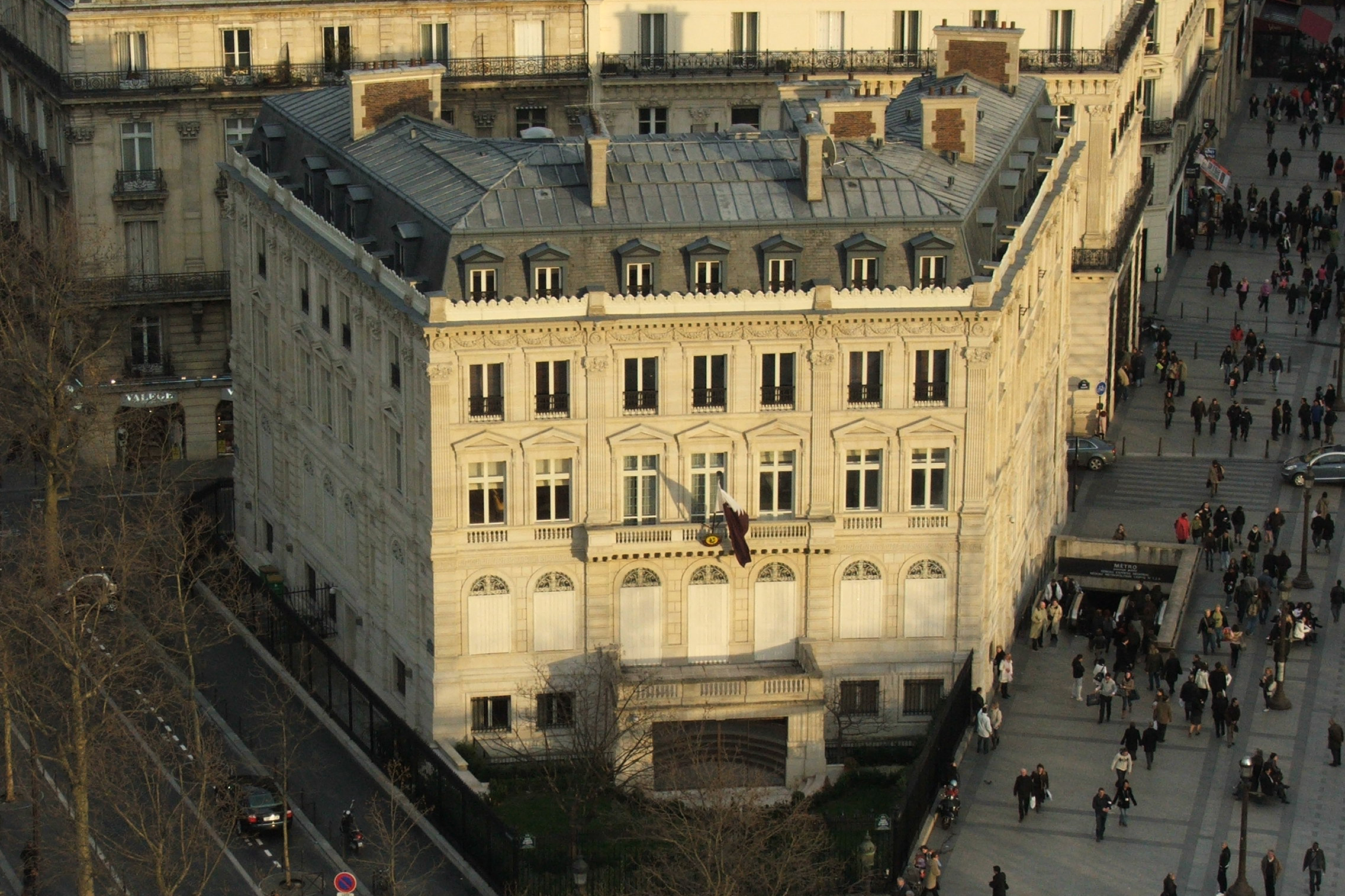
Embassy in Paris

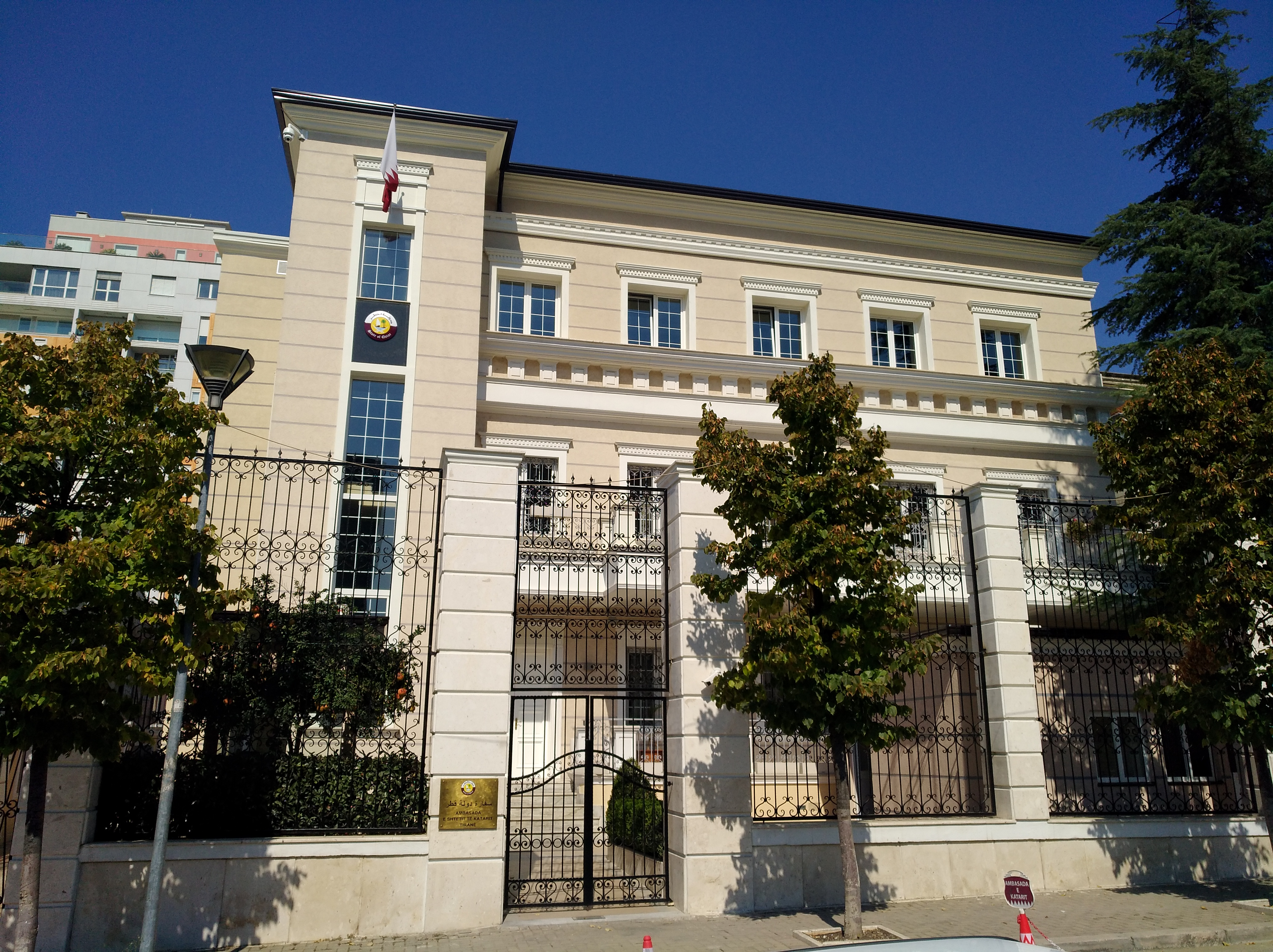
Embassy in Tirana

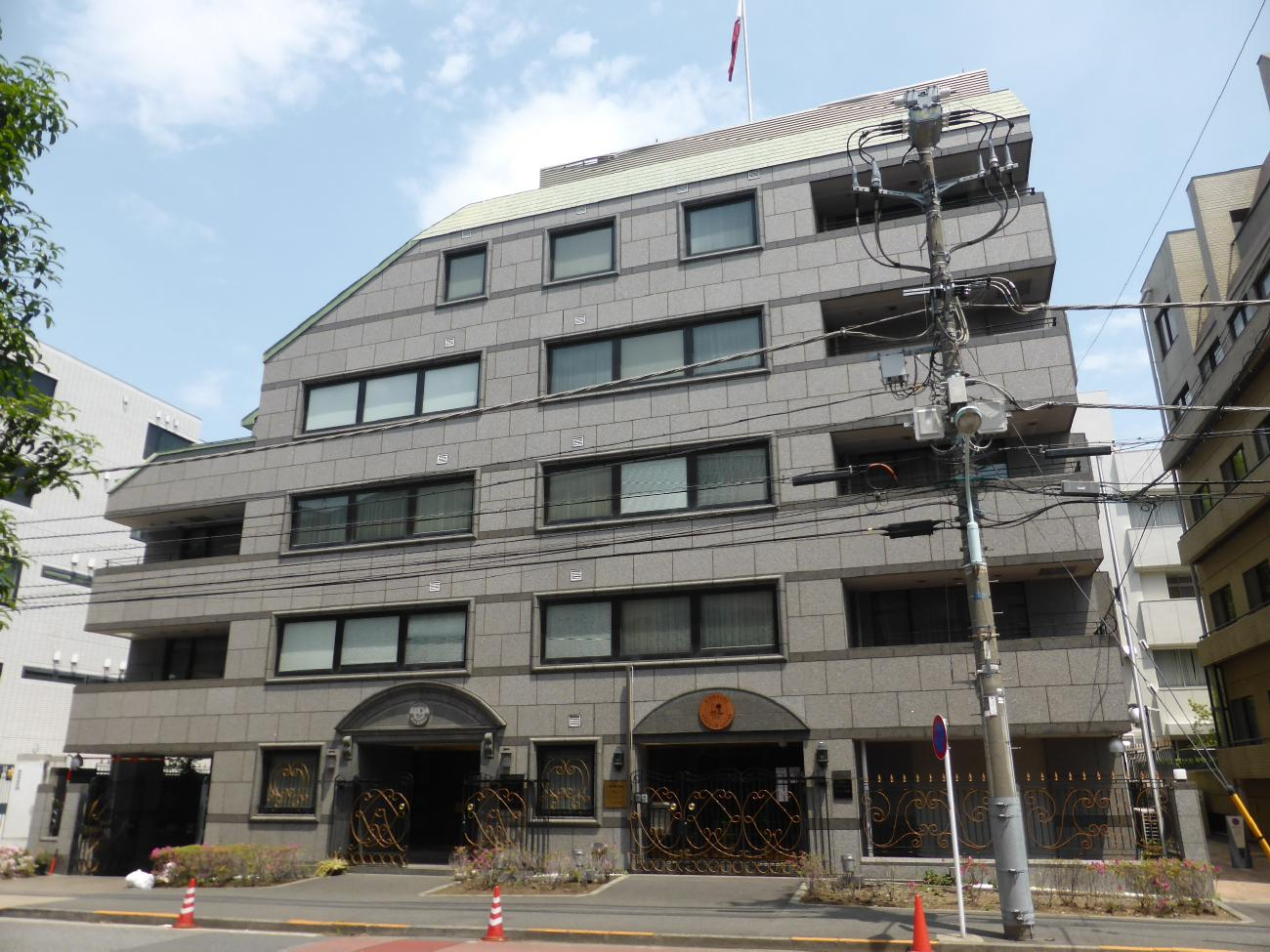
Embassy in Tokyo

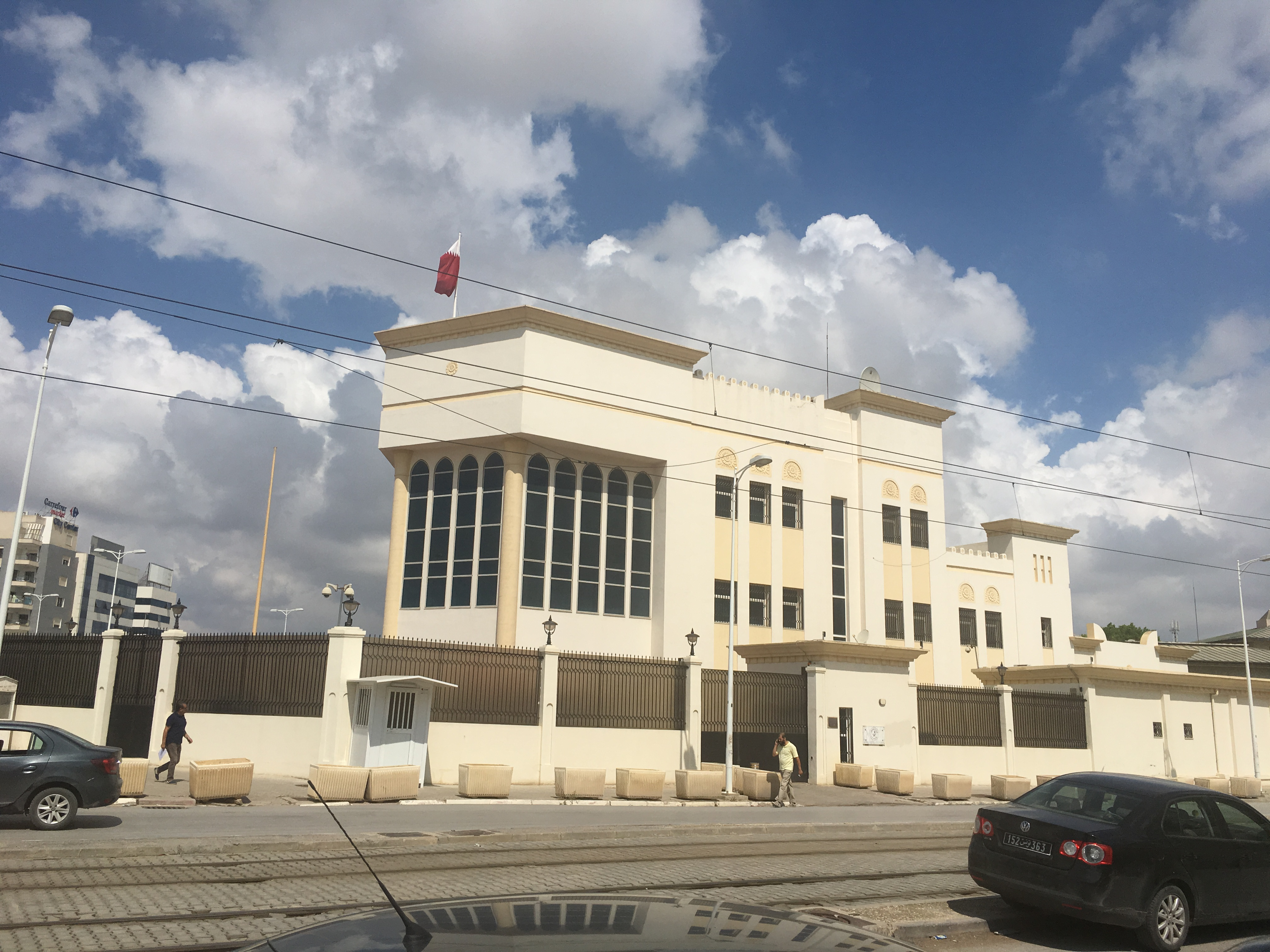
Embassy in Tunis

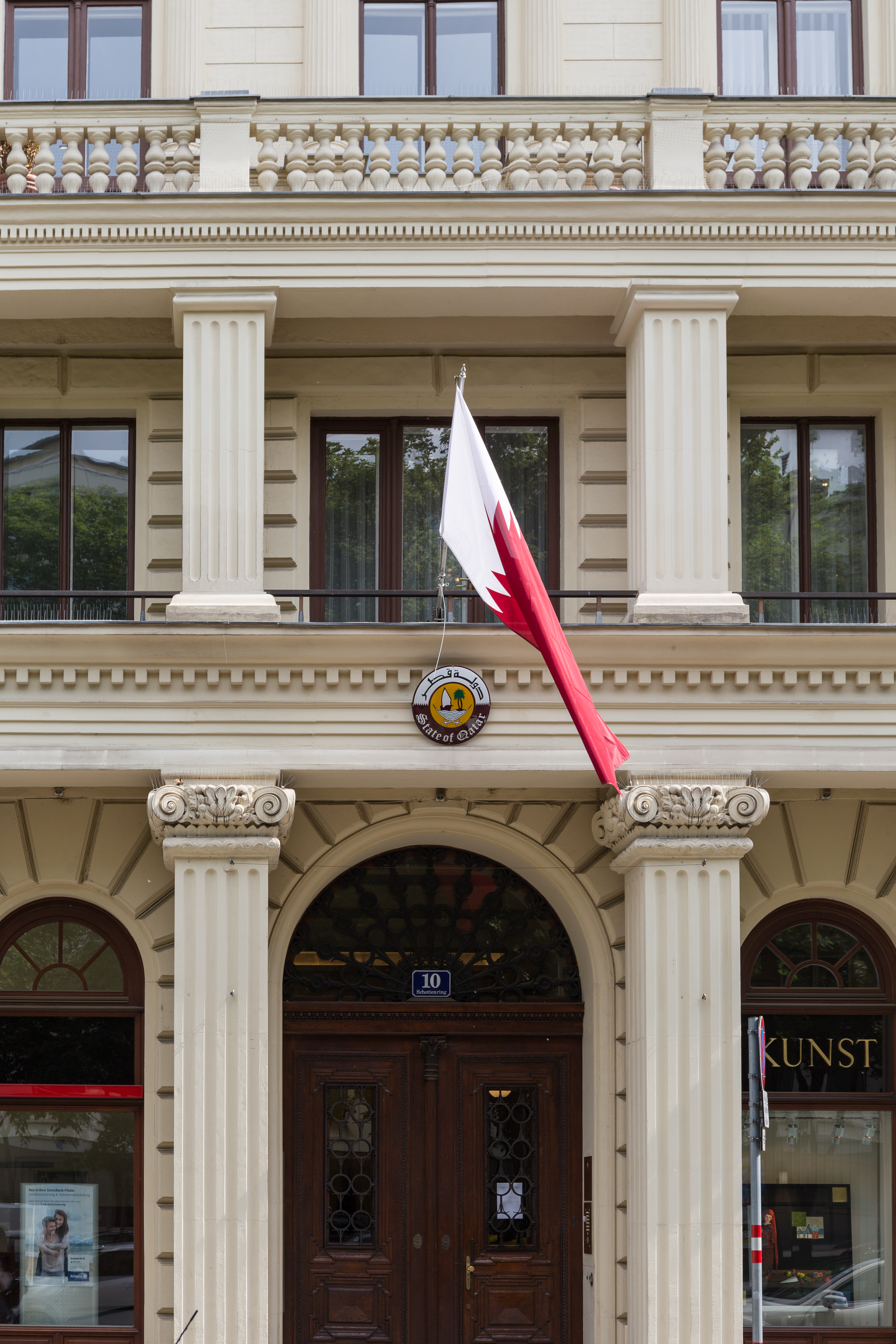
Embassy in Vienna

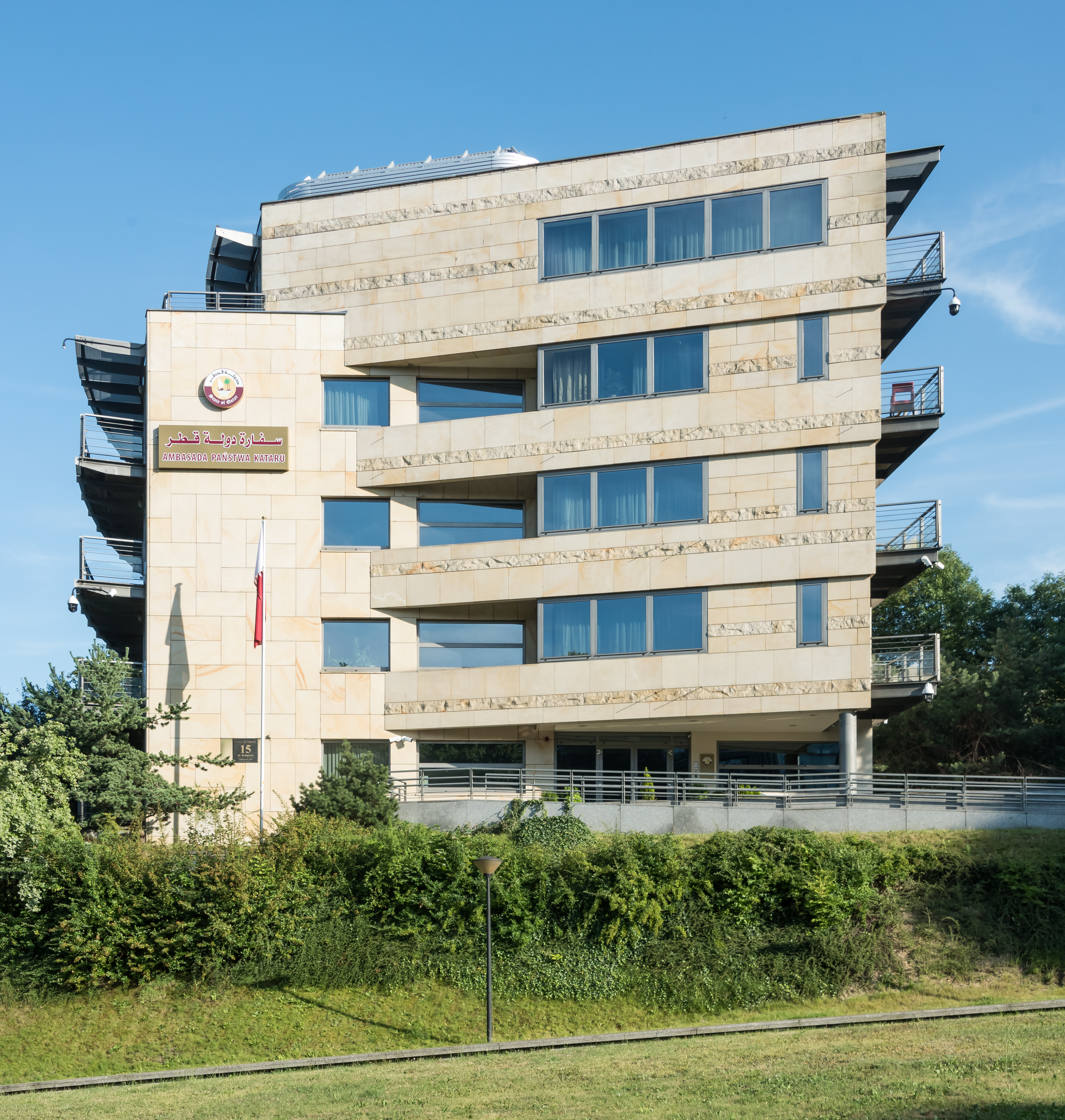
Embassy in Warsaw

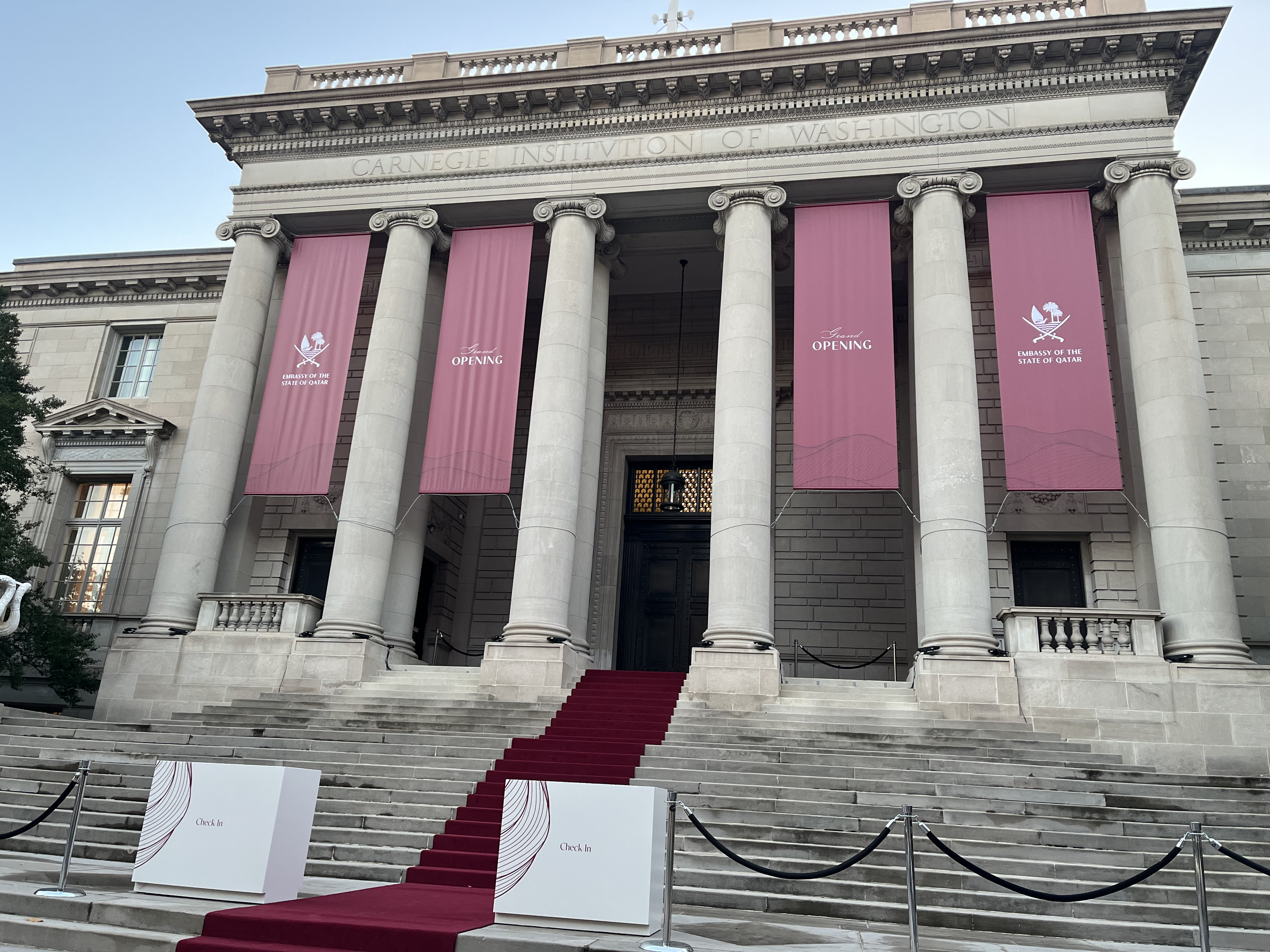
Embassy in Washington, D.C.

== Embassies to open ==
- Ireland
  - (Dublin) (Embassy)

== Closed missions ==
=== Africa ===
| Host country | Host city | Mission | Year closed | Ref. |
|---|---|---|---|---|
| Comoros | Moroni | Embassy | 2017 | |

=== Asia ===
| Host country | Host city | Mission | Year closed | Ref. |
|---|---|---|---|---|
| Yemen | Sana'a | Embassy | 2015 | |

== See also ==
- Foreign relations of Qatar
- Ministry of Foreign Affairs (Qatar)
- 2017 Qatar diplomatic crisis
