= Arcade Independence Square =

Shopping mall in Sri Lanka

Arcade - Independence Square
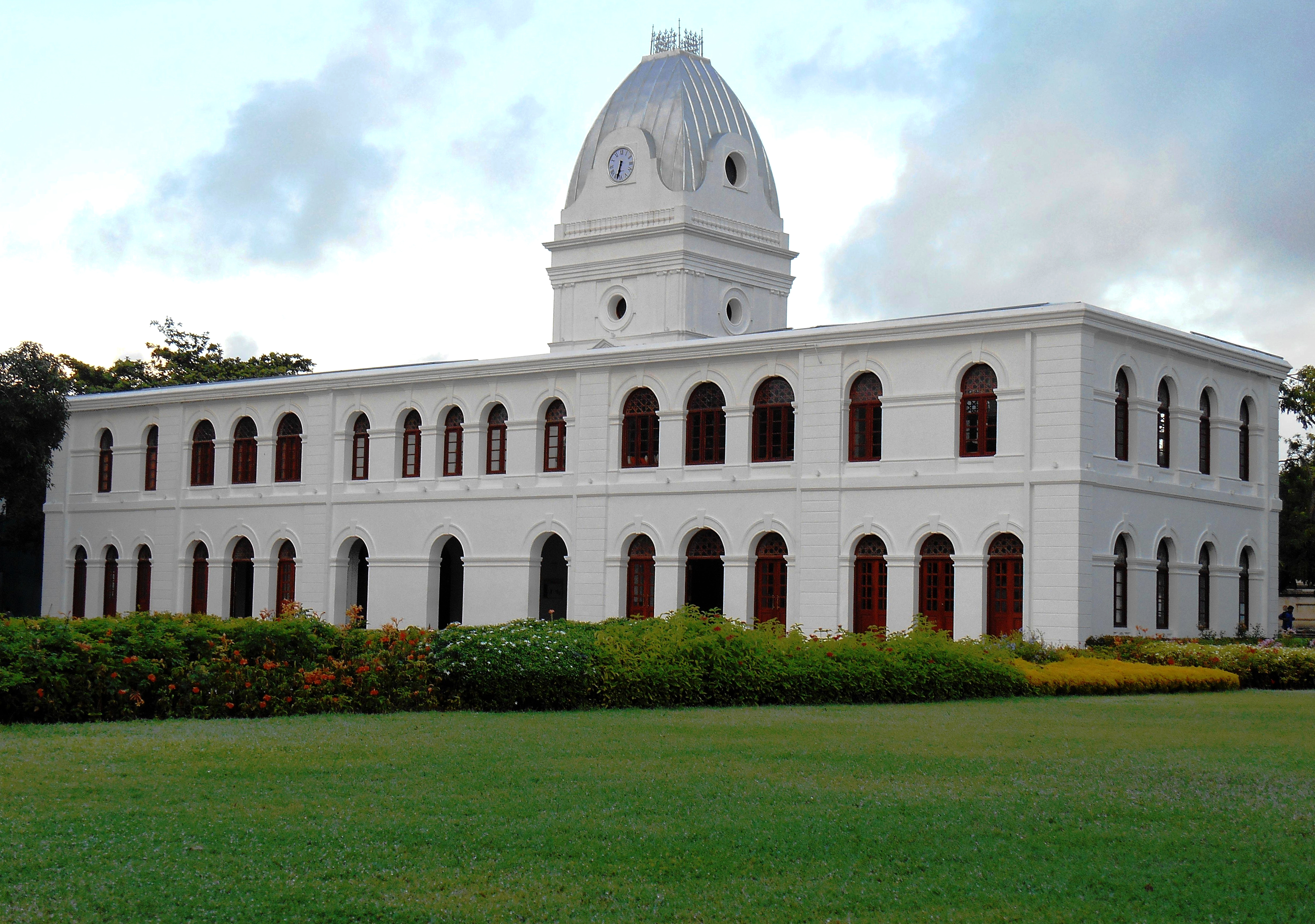
- Exterior of the main building
- Location: Colombo Sri Lanka
- Coordinates: 6°54′9″N 79°52′7″E
- Opened: 13 July 2014
- Developer: Urban Development Authority of Sri Lanka
- Manager: Urban Development Authority of Sri Lanka
- Owner: Urban Development Authority of Sri Lanka
- Num. of stores: 40+
- Floor area: 8,400 square metres (90,000 sq ft)
- Floors: 2
- Website: arcadeindependencesquare.com

The Arcade Independence Square is a shopping complex in Colombo, Sri Lanka. Housed in a group of renovated buildings including the former Jawatta Lunatic Asylum and the former Western Provincial Council Building, it was built as a part of the Independence Square Redevelopment programme initiated by the national government.

== History ==
The building was constructed in 1889 at a cost of Rs 450,000 to serve as the Jawatta Lunatic Asylum (also called the Cinnamon Gardens Asylum). In 1875, the then Governor, Sir William Gregory, based on the recommendations of the Principal Civil Medical Officer, Dr. W R Kynsey, decided to build a new asylum to replace the existing facility at Borella. Issues over the location and design meant that construction did not commence until 1879, following the intervention of the new Governor, Sir James Longdon. Even then further construction of the building was delayed until 1882. The building consisted of an entrance block, two patient wings (accommodating 400 patients) connected to the central administration and a boundary wall. Longdon defended the cost of the facility stating at the time, "The asylum is a series of one-storey buildings of the plainest type. The walls are of brick plastered, because of the climate plastering is found requisite for the preservation of buildings. There is no expensive ornamentation, or indeed any ornament at all, unless a short ungraceful and inexpensive tower over the entrance designed for the clock can be called an ornament. The enclosing walls are of ordinary cabook, such as is universally used for garden walls in Colombo." The Jawatta Asylum suffered from overcrowding within years of completion, housing over 500 patients. In 1917 a new larger facility was constructed at Angoda, with all the patients being transferred from Jawatta by 1926.

The building subsequently housed the newly established University College. The building complex was then occupied by the Sri Lanka Broadcasting Corporation (SLBC), the Public Administration Department, Auditor General's Department and later the Government Analyst's Department.

=== Renovation ===
In 2012 the Urban Development Authority commenced the renovation of the buildings and special care was taken to preserve their original architectural features whilst adding modern technological features and amenities. The construction of the mall took approximately 200 soldiers and six months of work to clear the spaces and fully reveal the original structures. The buildings remain true to the original complex with no additions or alterations. It took nearly two years to fully renovate the structure at a cost of Rs 550 million. The 8,400 m^{2} (90,000 sq ft) shopping complex was officially opened by the former President Mahinda Rajapaksa on 13 July 2014.

The arcade also houses Sri Lanka's first ever boutique cinema, 'The Empire Cineplex', run by Ceylon Theatres.
