= Siripala Samarakkody =

Ceylonese lawyer and politician

Siripala Samarakkody (1907 – 22 August 1944) was a Ceylonese lawyer and politician.

== Early life and education ==
Samarakkody was born in 1907, the eldest of seven children to Charles Peter Augustus de Fonseka Tillekeratne Samarakkody and Anne Catharine née Tillekeratne, his brothers include Edmund (MP for Dehiowita 1952–1960, Bulathsinhala 1960-65) and Stephen (MP for Polgahawela 1960–1965). He received his early education at St. Thomas' College, Mount Lavinia, before travelling to England and studying law at London University. He was called to the bar from the Middle Temple. Upon his return to Ceylon he entered politics, successfully contested a seat on the Dehiwela-Mount Lavinia Urban Council.

== Political career ==
In 1936 Samarakkody was elected a member of the 2nd State Council of Ceylon, for the seat of Narammala, defeating his nearest opponent by over 10,000 votes. He was one of the original members of Sinhala Maha Sabha before joining the Ceylon National Congress a few years later, where he served as the Congress' president. Samarakkody served on the Executive Committee of Local Administration, during which he acted as Minister for a short period. In May 1937 he moved the motion of protest against Governor Reginald Stubbs' deportation order for Mark Bracegirdle, without the advice of the acting Home Minister, which was passed by the State Council 34 votes to 7.

== Family ==
Samarakkody married Phyllis Nedra (Girlie) née Senanayake, the oldest daughter of Fredrick Richard Senanayake (1882–1926). They had three daughters, Malini, Rukmani and Surangani.

== Death ==
He died of Typhoid fever on 22 August 1944, at the age of 37 years, whilst still a member of the State Council. His brother-in-law, Richard Gotabhaya Senanayake, the cousin of Dudley Senanayake was elected in his place at the subsequent by-election.

Ferncliff Road, Mt Lavinia was re-named Siripala Road in his memory.
