= Soma Wickremanayake =

Ceylonese educator and politician (1915–1989)

Hon. Soma Wickremanayake
- සෝමා වික්‍රමනයක

Member of the Ceylonese Parliament for Dehiowita
- In office 1960–1965
- Preceded by: Edmund Samarakkody
- Succeeded by: Dhanapala Weerasekera

Personal details
- Born: Soma Dharmawardhana; 21 April 1915 Deraniyagala, Ceylon
- Died: 25 May 1989 (aged 74) Colombo, Sri Lanka
- Party: Lanka Sama Samaja Party
- Other political affiliations: Sri Lanka Freedom Party
- Spouse: Arthur G. Wickremanayake
- Children: 3
- Education: Ananda Sastralaya, Kotte
- Profession: teacher, politician

Soma Wickremanayake née Dharmawardhana (Sinhala: සෝමා වික්‍රමනයක) (21 May 1915 – 25 May 1989) was a Ceylonese educator and socialist politician.

== Early life ==
Soma Dharmawardhana was born on 21 May 1915, the eldest daughter of Dr. H. D. A. Dharmawardhana, the pharmacist on the Lakshahena Estate, Deraniyagala and Chariyaratne. She had her primary school education at the government mixed school in Aluthgama and her secondary education at Ananda Sastralaya, Kotte. She taught at Kegalu Vidyalaya, Ganemulla Vidyalaya and Kolonnawa Vidyalaya. Dharmawardhana married Arthur G. Wickramanayake, an inspector with the Department of Commerce and Trade. In 1939 she joined the Lanka Sama Samaja Party, becoming the secretary of the party's Women's League.

== Political career ==
At the 4th parliamentary election, held on 19 March 1960, Wickramanayake ran for the seat of Dehiowita, representing the Lanka Sama Samaja Party (LSSP). The sitting LSSP member for Dehiowita, Edmund Samarakkody, had chosen to run from the Kesbewa electorate instead. Wickramanayake was elected, polling 6,606 votes (37% of the total vote), only 546 votes ahead of the United National Party candidate, A. F. Wijemanne. The election results however left neither of Ceylon's two major parties with a majority, with the result being the calling of another election. She was subsequently re-elected at the 5th parliamentary election held on 20 July 1960. This time receiving 8,593 votes (50% of the total vote) and 603 votes ahead of Wijemanne. She was one of only three female representatives elected to Parliament during the July 1960 election.

Wickremanayake controversially switched political allegiance from the LSSP, becoming a member of the Sri Lanka Freedom Party. At the 6th parliamentary election, held on 22 March 1965, she contested the Avissawella electorate, challenging one of the LSSP's founders and the sitting member, Philip Gunawardena. She lost by 11,327 votes to Gunawardena, only securing 33% of the total vote.

Wickremanayake died on 25 May 1989, at the age of 74.
