= Ratna Deshapriya Senanayake =

Sri Lankan politician (1922–2012)

Ratna Deshapriya Senanayake (18 September 1922 - 21 January 2012) was a Sri Lankan politician. He was a member of parliament and Parliamentary Secretary for the Minister of Planning and Employment.

Qualified as proctor, he worked as a journalist, serving as the deputy editor of Lankadeepa and the Secretary General of the Afro Asian Writers’ Bureau. Having entered politics as a member of the Communist Party of Ceylon, he first contested the Dedigama electorate in 1960 July general election from the Sri Lanka Freedom Party and lost to Dudley Senanayake and was appointed Chairman of the Cooperative Wholesale Establishment (CWE), serving from 1960 to 1965. He again contested the 1965 general election from Dedigama and was again defeated by Dudley Senanayake. The new established national government carried out a public inquiry his tenure at the CWE. He contested the 1970 general election from Minneriya and was elected to parliament defeating C. P. de Silva and was appointed Parliamentary Secretary to the Minister of Planning and Employment. He contested the 1977 general election and lost to C. P. de Silva's brother Merril de Silva. He had served as Sri Lanka's Ambassador to Indonesia & Philippines and was the president of the China Friendship Association. Dharmasiri Senanayake was his brother and he was married to Gloria Senanayake.

== See also ==
- Sri Lankan Non Career Diplomats
