= Ministry of Tourism and Lands =

Government ministry of Sri Lanka

- සංචාරක හා ඉඩම් අමාත්‍යාංශය சுற்றுலாத்துறை மற்றும் காணி அமைச்சு

Ministry overview
- Jurisdiction: Government of Sri Lanka
- Headquarters: Mihikatha Medura, Land Secretariat, 1200/6 Rajamalwatta Avenue, Battaramulla, Colombo; 6°53′59.40″N 79°55′00.90″E
- Annual budget: Rs. 5 billion (2017, recurrent); Rs. 3 billion (2017, capital)
- Minister responsible: Vijitha Herath, Minister of Tourism and Lands
- Ministry executive: W.A. Chulananda Perera, Secretary
- Child agencies: Department of Land Commissioner General; Department of Land Settlement; Department of Land Use Policy Planning; Department of Surveyor General; Institute of Surveying and Mapping; Kantalai Sugar Company; Land Reform Commission; Land Survey Council
- Website: www.tourismmin.gov.lk

The Ministry of Tourism and Lands (Sinhala: සංචාරක හා ඉඩම් අමාත්‍යාංශය; Tamil: சுற்றுலாத்துறை மற்றும் காணி அமைச்சு) is the central government ministry of Sri Lanka responsible for land and parliamentary reforms. The ministry is responsible for formulating and implementing national policy on lands and other subjects which come under its purview. The current Minister of Tourism and Lands is Harin Fernando. The ministry's secretary is W.A. Chulananda Perera.

== Ministers ==
The Minister of Tourism and Lands is a member of the Cabinet of Sri Lanka.

Parties

Governors of British Ceylon United National Party Sri Lanka Freedom Party Sri Lanka Freedom Socialist Party Democratic National Movement Sri Lanka Podujana Peramuna Samagi Jana Balawegaya

Ministers of Lands
Name	Portrait	Party	Took office	Left office	Head of government	Ministerial title	Refs
D. S. Senanayake		United National Party	1931	1946	Henry Monck-Mason Moore	Minister of Agriculture and Lands	
Dudley Senanayake		United National Party	1946	1947	Henry Monck-Mason Moore	Minister of Agriculture and Lands	
Dudley Senanayake		United National Party	26 September 1947	26 March 1952	D. S. Senanayake	Minister of Agriculture and Lands	
P. B. Bulankulame		United National Party	26 March 1952	12 October 1953	Dudley Senanayake	Minister of Agriculture and Lands	
P. B. Bulankulame		United National Party	12 October 1953	12 April 1956	John Kotelawala	Minister of Lands and Land Development	
C. P. de Silva		Sri Lanka Freedom Party	12 April 1956	26 September 1959	S. W. R. D. Bandaranaike		
C. P. de Silva		Sri Lanka Freedom Party	26 September 1959	December 1959	W. Dahanayake	Minister of Agriculture and Lands	
M. D. Banda		United National Party	23 March 1960	1960	Dudley Senanayake	Minister of Agriculture and Lands	
C. P. de Silva		Sri Lanka Freedom Party	23 July 1960	29 May 1970	Sirimavo Bandaranaike	Minister of Agriculture, Land, Irrigation and Power	
C. P. de Silva		Sri Lanka Freedom Socialist Party	23 July 1960	29 May 1970	Dudley Senanayake	Minister of Land, Irrigation and Power	
Hector Kobbekaduwa		Sri Lanka Freedom Party			Sirimavo Bandaranaike	Minister of Agriculture and Lands	
Lionel Senanayake		United National Party	13 July 1977		J. R. Jayewardene	Minister of Agriculture and Lands	
P. Dayaratna		United National Party			Ranasinghe Premadasa	Minister of Land, Irrigation and Mahaweli Development	
Gamini Atukorale		United National Party	14 March 1991		Ranasinghe Premadasa	Minister of Land, Irrigation and Mahaweli Development	
D. M. Jayaratne		Sri Lanka Freedom Party	19 August 1994		D. B. Wijetunga	Minister of Agriculture, Land and Forestry Conservation	
Salinda Dissanayake		Sri Lanka Freedom Party	19 October 2000		Chandrika Kumaratunga	Minister of Land Development and Minor Export Agricultural Crops	
Anuruddha Ratwatte		Sri Lanka Freedom Party	14 September 2001		Chandrika Kumaratunga	Minister of Lands, Irrigation and Power	
Jeewan Kumaranatunga		Sri Lanka Freedom Party	28 January 2007		Mahinda Rajapaksa	Minister of Land and Land Development	
Janaka Bandara Tennakoon		Sri Lanka Freedom Party	23 April 2010		Mahinda Rajapaksa	Minister of Lands and Land Development	
M. K. D. S. Gunawardena^{✝}		Sri Lanka Freedom Party	12 January 2015	19 January 2016	Maithripala Sirisena	Minister of Lands	
M. K. D. S. Gunawardena^{✝}		Democratic National Movement	12 January 2015	19 January 2016	Maithripala Sirisena	Minister of Lands	
John Amaratunga		United National Party	2 March 2016	22 May 2017	Maithripala Sirisena	Minister of Lands	
Gayantha Karunatileka		United National Party	22 May 2017	21 November 2019	Maithripala Sirisena	Minister of Lands and Parliamentary Reforms	
S. M. Chandrasena		Sri Lanka Freedom Party	22 November 2019	3 April 2022	Gotabaya Rajapaksa	Minister of Lands and Development	
Harin Fernando		Samagi Jana Balawegaya	20 May 2022	9 July 2022	Gotabaya Rajapaksa	Minister of Tourism and Lands	
Harin Fernando		United National Party	22 July 2022	Present	Ranil Wickremesinghe	Minister of Tourism and Lands	

== Secretaries ==
Lands Secretaries
Name	Took office	Left office	Title	Refs
T. Asoka Peiris	25 April 2010		Lands and Land Development Secretary	
I. H. K. Mahanama	19 January 2015		Lands Secretary	
