= S. B. Lenawa =

Sri Lankan politician

Wanasinghe Rajapakse Senanayake Senevirathna Bandara Lenawa was a Sri Lankan politician. He was the member of Parliament of Sri Lanka from Kekirawa representing the Sri Lanka Freedom Party.

He was elected to parliament from Kekirawa in the March 1960 general election and was re-elected in the July 1960 general election. He crossed over to the opposition with C. P. de Silva in December 1964. He was re-elected in the 1965 general election from the Sri Lanka Freedom Socialist Party.
