= Ratnapura Electoral District (1947–1989) =

Former electoral district in Sri Lanka

Ratnapura electoral district was an electoral district of Sri Lanka between August 1947 and February 1989. The district was named after the city of Ratnapura in Ratnapura District, Sabaragamuwa Province. The 1978 Constitution of Sri Lanka introduced the proportional representation electoral system for electing members of Parliament. The existing 160 mainly single-member electoral districts were replaced with 22 multi-member electoral districts. Ratnapura electoral district was replaced by the Ratnapura multi-member electoral district at the 1989 general elections, the first under the proportional representation system, Ratnapura continues to be a polling division of the multi-member electoral district.

== Members of Parliament ==
Key

Independent SLFP UNP

Election	Member	Party	Term
1947	C. E. Attygalle	UNP	1947 - 1952
1952	C. E. Attygalle	UNP	1952 - 1956
1956	Jayaweera Kuruppu	SLFP	1956 - 1960
1960 (March)	H. Weragama	UNP	1960
1960 (July)	Dhanapala Weerasekera	SLFP	1960 - 1965
1965	Dhanapala Attygalle	UNP	1965 - 1970
1970	Nanda Ellawala	SLFP	1970- 1977
1977	G. V. Punchinilame	UNP	1977 - 1989

== Elections ==
=== 1947 Parliamentary General Election ===
Results of the 1st parliamentary election held between 23 August 1947 and 20 September 1947:

Candidate	Party	Symbol	Votes	%
Cyril Eugene Attygalle	United National Party	Cup	6,603	50.06
A. H. Wijetunge	Lanka Sama Samaja Party	Cartwheel	4,804	36.42
J. W. Rodrigo	Independent	Umbrella	587	4.45
K. A. Dalpatadu	Independent	Scales	430	3.26
Valid Votes			12,924	97.99
Rejected Votes			265	2.01
Total Polled			13,189	100.00
Registered Electors			25,961	
Turnout				50.80

=== 1952 Parliamentary General Election ===
Results of the 2nd parliamentary election held between 24 May 1952 and 30 May 1952:

Candidate	Party	Symbol	Votes	%
Cyril Eugene Attygalle	United National Party	Elephant	11,191	53.82
Arthur Reginald Perera	Communist Party of Ceylon	Star	9,380	45.11
Valid Votes			20,571	98.93
Rejected Votes			222	1.07
Total Polled			20,793	100.00
Registered Electors			27,578	
Turnout				75.40

=== 1956 Parliamentary General Election ===
Results of the 3rd parliamentary election held between 5 April 1956 and 10 April 1956:

Candidate	Party	Symbol	Votes	%
Jayaweera Kuruppu	Sri Lanka Freedom Party	Hand	16,644	70.75
Cyril Eugene Attygalle	United National Party	Elephant	6,286	26.72
D. A. Karunaratne		Glasses	405	1.72
Valid Votes			23,335	99.20
Rejected Votes			189	0.08
Total Polled			23,524	100.00
Registered Electors			32,335	
Turnout				72.75

=== 1960 (March) Parliamentary General Election ===
Results of the 4th parliamentary election held on 19 March 1960:

Candidate	Party	Symbol	Votes	%
H. Weragama	United National Party	Elephant	7,434	34.78
Victor Abeyaratne	Mahajana Eksath Peramuna	Cartwheel	5,385	25.19
Sarath Muttetuwegama	Communist Party of Ceylon	Star	4,117	19.26
Kamani Meedeniya		Key	3,047	14.26
Dharmasiri Kuruppu		Book	1,192	5.58
B. Jayasuriya		Umbrella	107	0.50
Valid Votes			21,282	99.57
Rejected Votes			92	0.43
Total Polled			21,374	100.00
Registered Electors			27,677	
Turnout				77.23

=== 1960 (July) Parliamentary General Election ===
Results of the 5th parliamentary election held on 20 July 1960:

Candidate	Party	Symbol	Votes	%
Dhanapala Weerasekera	Sri Lanka Freedom Party	Hand	12,977	60.69
H. Weragama	United National Party	Elephant	8,013	37.47
Nimal Karunatilake	Mahajana Eksath Peramuna	Cartwheel	332	1.55
Valid Votes			21,322	99.71
Rejected Votes			61	0.29
Total Polled			21,383	100.00
Registered Electors			27,677	
Turnout				77.26

=== 1965 Parliamentary General Election ===
Results of the 6th parliamentary election held on 22 March 1965:

Candidate	Party	Symbol	Votes	%
Dhanapala Attygalle	United National Party	Elephant	11,463	39.22
Sarath Muttetuwegama		Lamp	8,860	30.31
Dharmaprema Jayawardena	Sri Lanka Freedom Party	Hand	8,580	29.35
Ananda Wijeratne		Sun	180	0.62
Siripala Weerawardhana		Scales	68	0.23
Valid Votes			29,151	99.73
Rejected Votes			78	0.27
Total Polled			29,229	100.00
Registered Electors			36,027	
Turnout				81.13

=== 1970 Parliamentary General Election ===
Results of the 7th parliamentary election held on 27 May 1970:

Candidate	Party	Symbol	Votes	%
Nanda Ellawala	Sri Lanka Freedom Party	Hand	22,633	64.54
P. B. Wijesundara	United National Party	Elephant	12,002	34.23
K. V. Dharmadasa		Chair	190	0.54
K.T. Manis Singho		Bell	159	0.45
Valid Votes			34,984	99.76
Rejected Votes			83	0.24
Total Polled			35,067	100.00
Registered Electors			42,004	
Turnout				83.49

=== 1977 Parliamentary General Election ===
Results of the 8th parliamentary election held on 21 July 1977:

Candidate	Party	Symbol	Votes	%
G. V. Punchinilame	United National Party	Elephant	23,525	52.50
Nanda Ellawala	Communist Party of Ceylon	Star	16,022	35.75
Piyadasa Pelendagama	Sri Lanka Freedom Party	Hand	5,000	11.16
Mahinda Aabeysekera		Scales	157	0.35
Valid Votes			44,683	99.72
Rejected Votes			123	0.28
Total Polled			44,807	100.00
Registered Electors			51,679	
Turnout				86.70
