= Senanayake family =

Sri Lankan family

The Senanayake family
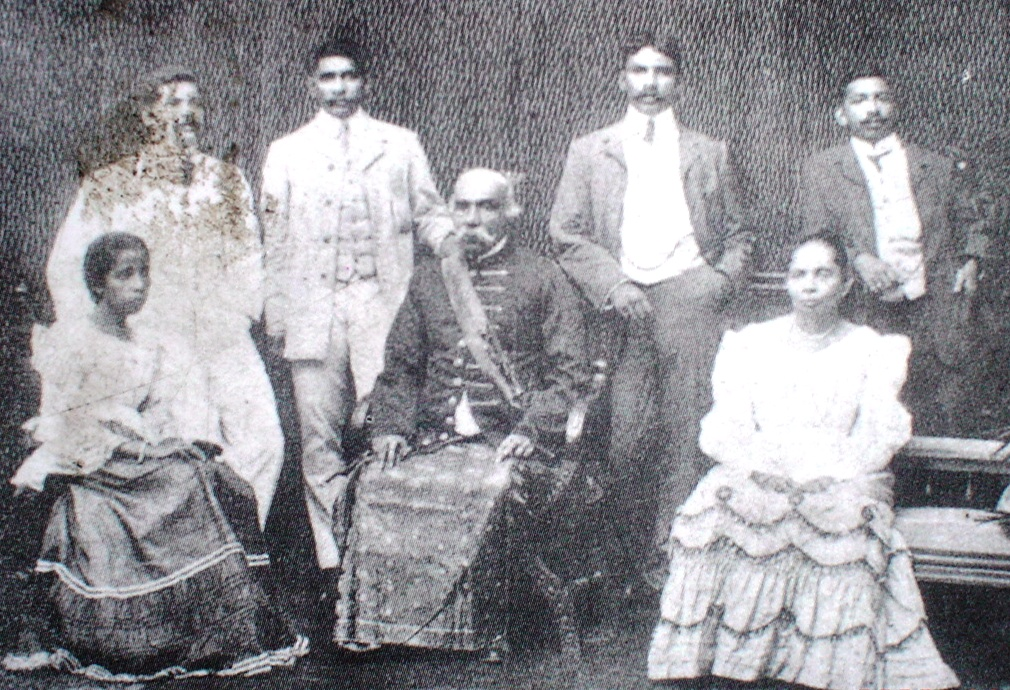
- Mudaliyar Don Spater Senanayake with son-in-law F H Dias-Bandaranaike, sons Don Stephen Senanayake, Don Charles Senanayake and Fredrick Richard Senanayake, daughter Maria Francesca and wife Dona Catherina Elizabeth Perera Gunasekara
- Current region: Colombo
- Origin: Bothale Ihalagama
- Members: Don Stephen Senanayake, Fredrick Richard Senanayake, Don Spater Senanayake, Dudley Senanayake, Rukman Senanayake, Ruwan Wijewardene
- Connected families: Wijewardene family
- Traditions: Theravada Buddhism
- Estates: Bothale Walawwa, Woodlands, Colombo, Grassmere, Colombo

The Senanayake family is a Sri Lankan family that is prominent in enterprise and politics. Along with many members who have been successful politician across generations, the family includes two Prime Ministers of Sri Lanka.

== History ==
Don Spater from the village of Bothale became a successful mine owner. Making his fortune in graphite mining, he invested in plantations and in the arrack renting franchise. He assumed the name Senanayake and was awarded the title of Mudaliyar by the colonial government. His sons continued his business ventures, and was in the forefront of the temperance movement that transitioned into the modern independence movement led by his sons Fredrick Richard Senanayake and Don Stephen Senanayake following the brutal suppression of the 1915 riots by the British. Don Stephen Senanayake who lead the negotiations with the British Government, was elected the first Prime Minister of Ceylon in 1947, having won the first Parliamentary elections after forming the United National Party. On his sudden death, while in office, his son Dudley Senanayake succeeded him as Prime Minister and went on to server several terms.

== Family Tree ==
- Don Bartholomew
  - Don Spater Senanayake (1848–1907), Mudaliyar + Dona Catherina Elizabeth Perera Gunasekera Senanayake (1848-?)
    - Don Charles Senanayake (1878–1931) + Euphemia Grace Millicent
      - Ivy Senanayake (1911–1984) + Dr Edmond Asoka Bulankulame (1900–1978)
        - Visakha Bulankulame (1935–1999) + Tissa Wijeyeratne (1923–2002)
    - Maria Frances Senanayake + Fredrik H. Dias Bandaranaike
      - Effie Manthri Dias Bandaranaike + Sir John Kotelawala (divorced), Prime Minister of Ceylon, Member of Parliament, Member of State Council
        - Lakshmi Kotelawala + Henry Gerald Kotalawala
      - Ranee Dias Bandaranaike + Shirly Alwis
      - Nita Dias Bandaranaike + Seneviratne (divorced)
      - Ramachandra Dias Bandaranaike + Constance Don Carolis (divorced)
    - Fredrick Richard Senanayake (1882–1926), Member of the Colombo Municipal Council and independence activist + Ellen Attygalle
      - Richard Gotabhaya Senanayake (1911–1970) Government Minister, Member of Parliament
      - Phyllis Nedra "Girlie" Senanayake + Siripala Samarakkody, Member of State Council of Ceylon
    - Don Stephen Senanayake (1884–1952), Prime Minister of Ceylon, Member of Parliament, Member of State Council, Member of Legislative Council + Mollie Dunuwila Senanayake
      - Dudley Senanayake (1911–1973), Prime Minister of Ceylon, Government Minister, Member of Parliament
      - Robert Parakrama Senanayake (1913–1986) + Swarna Neela Senanayake (daughter of Fredrick Richard Senanayake)
        - Ranjani Senanayake + Ranjith Wijewardene (of the Wijewardene family)
          - Ruwan Wijewardene (1975- ), Cabinet Minister and Member of Parliament
          - Irushi Wijewardene (1972-) + Shastha Bulathsinhala
            - Shakun Bulathsinhala (2002-)
        - Rukman Senanayake (1948-2024), Assistant Leader of United National Party, Government Minister, Member of Parliament
        - Ranjit Senanayake + Suwanitha
          - Vasantha Senanayake (1973- ), Member of Parliament

Other distant members of the family include;

- Wijewardene family
  - Junius Richard Jayewardene
  - Ranil Wickremesinghe
- Ranjan Wijeratne

== Houses built by family ==
- Bothale Walawwa
- Woodlands, Colombo
- Grassmere, Colombo

== See also ==
- List of political families in Sri Lanka
