= Edmund Samarakkody =

Ceylonese lawyer, trade unionist, politician and Member of Parliament

Hon. Edmund Samarakkody
- එඩ්මන්ඩ් සමරක්කොඩි

Member of the Ceylonese Parliament for Dehiowita
- In office 1952–1960
- Preceded by: Reginald Perera
- Succeeded by: Soma Wickremanayake

Member of the Ceylonese Parliament for Bulathsinhala
- In office 1960–1965
- Preceded by: W. M. Bibile Fonseka
- Succeeded by: Mangala Moonesinghe

Personal details
- Born: 19 April 1912
- Died: 4 January 1992 (aged 79) Colombo, Sri Lanka
- Party: Revolutionary Workers Party
- Spouse: Dagmar née Samarakkody
- Relations: Siripala Samarakkody (brother); Stephen Samarakkody (brother)
- Children: Nahil (son), Chulanganee (daughter)
- Education: Ceylon Law College
- Profession: Lawyer
- Ethnicity: Sinhalese

Edmund Peter Samarakkody (19 April 1912 – 4 January 1992) was a Ceylonese lawyer, trade unionist, politician and Member of Parliament.

== Early life and family ==
Samarakkody was born on 19 April 1912, the fifth of seven children to Charles Peter Augustus de Fonseka Tillekeratne Samarakkody, Muhandiram of the Governor Gate and planter; and Anne Catharine née Tillekeratne, daughter of Nicholas Tillekeratne, Mudaliyar of Matara. He was educated at S. Thomas' College, Mount Lavinia. After school he joined the Ceylon Law College, qualifying as a proctor. Stephen Samarakkody and Siripala Samarakkody were his brothers, while Panini Ilangakoon and Robert Edward Jayatilaka were his brother-in-laws.

Samarakkody married his first cousin Dagmar Samarakkody. They had a daughter (Chulanganee) and a son (Nahil).

== Career ==
Samarakkody became a proctor of the Supreme Court in 1936 and started practicing law in Badulla. He then worked at the Mount Lavinia bar for over four decades.

Samarakkody became involved in anti-imperialist nationalistic politics in the early 1930s when he joined the Colombo South Youth League (CSYL), an affiliate of the All Ceylon Youth Congress. In 1933 Indian workers at the Wellawatte Spinning and Weaving Mills went on strike and were supported by the CSYL. The strike was undermined by A. Ekanayake Gunasinha and his Ceylon Labour Union which used Sinhalese blacklegs to break the strike. In the 1920s Gunasinha had been the first to organise labour in Ceylon. Colvin R. de Silva, Leslie Goonewardene, Philip Gunawardena, Samarakkody and S. A. Wickramasinghe established the Wellawatte Mill Workers Union with de Silva as its president.

Samarakkody was one of the founding members of the Lanka Sama Samaja Party (LSSP) in December 1935 and was elected to its executive committee. He took a leading role in militant leftist action, including the strikes at Vavasseur Coconut Mill and the Colombo Commercial Company Fertiliser Works in 1937, the latter for which he and Goonewardene were arrested. The LSSP was beset with internal divisions - militants within the party (Colvin R. de Silva, William de Silva, Goonewardene, Vernon Gunasekera, Philip Gunawardena, Robert Gunawardena, N. M. Perera, Samarakkody etc.) formed the "T" group (Trotskyist) which sided with Leon Trotsky in the International Communist whilst Stalinists (P. Kandiah, M. G. Mendis, A. Vaidyalingam, Wickramasinghe etc.) formed another group. The Stalinists were expelled from the LSSP in 1940 and went on to form the United Socialist Party (later reconstituted as the Communist Party of Ceylon) in 1941.

When World War II broke out in September 1939 the LSSP opposed the "second imperialist war". The LSSP played a major role in a wave of strikes in 1939/40 and consequently it was proscribed in 1940 and its leaders Colvin R. de Silva, Philip Gunawardena, Perera and Samarakkody arrested in June 1940. Goonewardene evaded arrest and went into hiding. The quartet were imprisoned at Welikada Prison but after staging a hunger striker they were transferred to Bogambara Prison. The four LSSP leaders, aided by sympathetic prison guards, escaped from Bogambara on 7 April 1942 and whilst de Silva, Gunawardena and Perera fled to India Samarakkody went into hiding in Ceylon.

In India the LSSP leaders merged their party with the Bolshevik Leninist Party of the United Provinces and Bihar and the Bolshevik Mazdoor Party of India to create the Bolshevik–Leninist Party of India, Ceylon and Burma (BLPI) in April 1942 with the LSSP as its Ceylonese branch. De Silva, Gunawardena and Perera were arrested by the Indian police in 1943 after being betrayed by Stalinist called Shukla and deported back to Ceylon. Other LSSP members (Hector Abhayavardhana, Doric de Souza, Leslie Goonewardene, Vivienne Goonewardene, V. Karalasingham, Allan Mendis and Bernard Soysa) stayed behind in India to build up the BLPI.

Samarakkody was re-arrested in 1944. De Silva, Philip Gunawardena, Perera and Samarakkody were prosecuted, convicted and sentenced to six months in prison. Samarakkody lost his civic rights and his license to practice law was suspended for two years. Towards the end of World War II in 1945 Gunawardena and Perera broke from the BLPI and resurrected the LSSP as a separate party. De Silva, Leslie Goonewardene, Samarakkody and Soysa remained in the BLPI.

Samarakkody's civic rights had not been re-instated after the end of the war but the government amended the law which allowed Samarakkody to contest parliamentary elections. Samarakkody stood as the BLPI candidate in Mirigama at the 1947 parliamentary election but on was defeated by D. S. Senanayake, leader of the United National Party and future Prime Minister. In 1948 the BLPI merged with the Congress Socialist Party to create the Socialist Party. The BLPI's Ceylon branch became a separate party, the Bolshevik Samasamaja Party (BSP). The BSP and LSSP merged in 1950. Philip Gunawardena, who opposed the merger, left the LSSP and founded the Viplavakari Lanka Sama Samaja Party (VLSSP).

Samarakkody stood as the LSSP candidate in Dehiowita at the 1952 parliamentary election. He won the election and entered Parliament. He was re-elected at the 1956 parliamentary election. He stood as the LSSP candidate in Kesbewa at the March 1960 parliamentary election but failed to get re-elected. He stood as the LSSP candidate in Bulathsinhala at the July 1960 parliamentary election. He won the election and re-entered Parliament.

Whilst Ceylon's main political parties, the United National Party (UNP) and Sri Lanka Freedom Party (SLFP), together with the VLSSP, supported the Sinhala Only Act, the leftists, led by the LSSP, opposed the act. In May 1960 LSSP leader Perera proposed that the party form a coalition government with SLFP. Samarakkody led a group of LSSP members opposed the proposition. De Silva, de Souza, Goonewardene and Soysa initially opposed Perera's proposition but eventually abandoned their beliefs and supported the move. The LSSP joined the SLFP government in June 1964. LSSP members who opposed the move (Meryl Fernando, Karalasingham, Samarakkody, Bala Tampoe etc.) left the LSSP and formed the Lanka Sama Samaja Party (Revolutionary) (LSSP(R)) with Samarakkody as its secretary. In December 1964 the LSSP(R)'s two MPs, Fernando and Samarakkody, together with several rebel SLFP MPs, voted for an opposition amendment to the government's throne speech, defeating the government and precipitating the dissolution of Parliament. Fernando and Samarakkody's action proved controversial within the LSSP(R) as they had in effect supported the capitalist UNP which would go on to win the 1965 parliamentary election. The LSSP(R) supported Fernando and Samarakkody's action but some members who opposed it (Karalasingham and the Sakthi group) left the LSSP(R) and rejoined the LSSP in 1966.

Samarakkody stood as the LSSP(R) candidate in Bulathsinhala at the 1965 parliamentary election but failed to get re-elected. Samarakkody fell out with LSSP(R) leader Tampoe and in 1968 left the party, together with Fernando, and founded the Revolutionary Sama Samaja Party (renamed Revolutionary Workers Party in 1973).

Samarakkody was also a member of Dehiwela-Mt Lavinia Urban Council and served as its chairman. During the Sri Lankan Civil War Samarakkody was one of only a few Sinhalese who spoke up for the Tamils, whom he considered were oppressed by Sinhalese bourgeoisie, and their right to self-determination. Samarakkody died on 4 January 1992 at Colombo General Hospital.

== Electoral history ==
Electoral history of Edmund Samarakkody
Election	Constituency	Party	Votes	Result
1947 parliamentary	Mirigama	BLPI	10,673	Not elected
1952 parliamentary	Dehiowita	LSSP	8,848	Elected
1956 parliamentary	Dehiowita	LSSP	14,954	Elected
1960 March parliamentary	Kesbewa	LSSP	7,433	Not elected
1960 July parliamentary	Bulathsinhala	LSSP	10,103	Elected
1965 parliamentary	Bulathsinhala	LSSP(R)	278	Not elected
