= Dharmasiri Senanayake =

Sri Lankan politician (1933–2000)

Hon. Dharmasiri Senanayake

Personal details
- Born: 30 March 1933 British Ceylon
- Died: 24 July 2000 (aged 67) Sri Lanka
- Party: Sri Lanka Freedom Party
- Education: Udugampola Maha Vidyalaya; Ananda College; University of Peradeniya
- Occupation: Politician
- Profession: Lawyer

Dharmasiri Alwis Senanayake (30 March 1933 – 24 July 2000) was a Sri Lankan politician and member of parliament.

== Early life and education ==
Born in Patthanduwana, Minuwangoda to Senanayake Seneviratne Wasala Mudalige Don David Senanayake and Dona Laisa Abeysinghe. His brother was Ratna Deshapriya Senanayake. Senanayake educated at the Yagomulla School and at Ananda College. He entered University of Celyon, Peradeniya in 1953.

== Early career ==
After graduating from university, Senanayake started working as a lecturer in economics in the Vidyodaya University in 1959 and at the same time gained admission to the Ceylon Law College. He took oaths as an advocate in 1963 and started his legal career in the unofficial bar at the Kegalle Magistrate's Court.

== Political career ==
Senanayake first contested the 1970 general election from the Dedigama electorate and lost to Dudley Senanayake. He was soon after appointed Chairman of the Tourist Board in 1970. He again contested the Dedigama electorate in 1973 in the by election that followed the death of Dudley Senanayake, but was defeated by Rukman Senanayake. He contested the 1977 general election and lost to Nissanka Wijeyeratne. He finally was elected to parliament from Kegalla in the 1989 general election and in 1993 was appointed General Secretary of the Sri Lanka Freedom Party and Vice President of the People's Alliance. He was re-elected to parliament in 1994 following the victory of the People's Alliance, where he was appointed Minister of Tourism, Aviation and Media by President Chandrika Kumaratunga and later Minister of Tourism and Aviation. He died on 24 July 2000, following heart surgery.
