= Maithripala Herath =

Sri Lankan politician (1928–2015)

Hon. Maithripala Herath

Member of the Ceylonese Parliament for Dedigama
- In office 1956–1960
- Preceded by: Dudley Senanayake
- Succeeded by: Dudley Senanayake

Member of the Ceylonese Parliament for Polgahawela
- In office 1970–1977
- Preceded by: M. D. Banda
- Succeeded by: J. A. D. S. R. Jayakody

Personal details
- Born: 5 June 1928
- Died: 20 February 2015 (aged 86)
- Party: Sri Lanka Freedom Party

Maithripala Herath (5 June 1928 - 20 February 2015) was a Sri Lankan teacher and politician. He was a member of parliament from Dedigama and Polgahawela.

Educated at St. Mary's College, Kegalle, he went on to become a teacher at Galigamuwa College. He contested the Dedigama, representing the Sri Lanka Freedom Party at the 1956 general election and was elected to parliament. He unsuccessfully contested the 1960 March general election, polling fourth. He was elected to the Senate in 1956 and was elected in the 1970 general election in the Polgahawela electorate. He was defeated at the 1977 general election.

He was responsible for the construction of the Home for the Elders' in Nelundeniya and also worked as the Chief Devotee of the Dedigama Rajamaha Viharaya.
