= Dhanapala Weerasekera =

Ceylonese politician (1924–2011)

Hon. Dhanapala Weerasekera

Member of the Ceylon Parliament for Ratnapura
- In office 1960–1965
- Preceded by: H. Weragama
- Succeeded by: Dhanapala Attygalle

Member of the Ceylon Parliament for Dehiowita
- In office 1965–1977
- Preceded by: Soma Wickremanayake
- Succeeded by: Post-abolished

Personal details
- Born: 26 May 1924 Ratnapura, Sri Lanka
- Died: 24 February 2011 (aged 86)
- Party: Lanka Sama Samaja Party
- Spouse: Joyce Eleanor Pinto Jayawardena
- Profession: politician

Dhanapala Philip Ranil Weerasekera (26 May 1924 – 24 February 2011) was a Ceylonese politician.

A member of the Lanka Sama Samaja Party, he was elected to parliament from the Ratnapura electorate in the July 1960 general elections. He then contested the Dehiowita electorate and won in the 1965 general elections and the 1970 general elections. He contested and lost the 1977 general elections from the Deraniyagala electorate.

Born to T. B. Weerasekara, Ratey Mahatmaya/රටේ මහත්මයා of Pelmadulla. He was married to Joyce Eleanor Pinto Jayawardena, they had two daughters.
