= Minneriya Electoral District =

Electoral district of Sri Lanka

Minneriya electoral district was an electoral district of Sri Lanka between March 1960 and February 1989. The district was named after the town of Minneriya in Anuradhapura District, North Central Province. The 1978 Constitution of Sri Lanka introduced the proportional representation electoral system for electing members of Parliament. The existing 160 mainly single-member electoral districts were replaced with 22 multi-member electoral districts. Minneriya electoral district was replaced by the Anuradhapura multi-member electoral district at the 1989 general elections, the first under the proportional representation system, continues to be a polling division of the multi-member electoral district.

== Members of Parliament ==
Key

Independent SLFP UNP

Election	Member	Party	Term
1960 (March)	C. P. de Silva		
1960 (July)	C. P. de Silva		
1965	C. P. de Silva		
1970	Ratna Deshapriya Senanayake		
1977	Merril de Silva		

== Elections ==
=== 1960 (March) Parliamentary General Election ===
Results of the 4th parliamentary election held on 19 March 1960:

Candidate	Party	Symbol	Votes	%
C. P. de Silva		Hand	9,770	
D. D. Kulatunga		Elephant	1,707	
Ananda L. Gunaratne		Cartwheel	210	
Wilson Kalansuriy		Umbrella	190	
Martin Wickremasinghe		Key	170	
Valid Votes				
Rejected Votes			126	
Total Polled			12,173	100.00
Registered Electors			15,981	
Turnout				

=== 1960 (July) Parliamentary General Election ===
Results of the 5th parliamentary election held on 20 July 1960:

Candidate	Party	Symbol	Votes	%
C. P. de Silva		Hand	9,489	
Charles Amunugama		Elephant	2,177	
Valid Votes				
Rejected Votes			101	
Total Polled			11,767	100.00
Registered Electors			15,981	
Turnout				

=== 1965 Parliamentary General Election ===
Results of the 6th parliamentary election held on 22 March 1965:

Candidate	Party	Symbol	Votes	%
C. P. de Silva		Sun	9,702	
H. M. William Banda		Hand	8,572	
Valid Votes				
Rejected Votes			203	
Total Polled			18,477	100.00
Registered Electors			23,351	
Turnout				

=== 1970 Parliamentary General Election ===
Results of the 7th parliamentary election held on 27 May 1970:

Candidate	Party	Symbol	Votes	%
Ratna Deshapriya Senanayake			15,705	
C. P. de Silva			13,197	
Valid Votes				
Rejected Votes			118	
Total Polled			29,020	100.00
Registered Electors			34,551	
Turnout				

=== 1977 Parliamentary General Election ===
Results of the 8th parliamentary election held on 21 July 1977:

Candidate	Party	Symbol	Votes	%
Merril de Silva		Elephant	14,513	
Ratna Deshapriya Senanayake		Hand	9,930	
Percy Wickremasekera		Key	263	
P. B. Wattegedera		Eye	131	
M. A. A. Udagedera		Clock	98	
Valid Votes			28,863	
Rejected Votes			87	
Total Polled			25,022	100.00
Registered Electors			28,863	
Turnout				
