= C. P. de Silva =

Sri Lankan politician and civil servant

Hon. C. P. de Silva
- de Silva in 1961

3rd Leader of the Opposition
- In office 30 March 1960 – 23 April 1960
- Prime Minister: Dudley Senanayake
- Preceded by: N. M. Perera
- Succeeded by: Dudley Senanayake

Leader of the House
- In office 5 August 1960 – 25 March 1970
- Preceded by: J. R. Jayewardene
- Succeeded by: Maithripala Senanayake
- In office 19 April 1956 – 5 December 1959
- Preceded by: J. R. Jayewardene
- Succeeded by: J. R. Jayewardene

Minister of Lands, Land Development and Agriculture
- In office 1956–1959

Minister of Power and Irrigation
- In office 1960–1964

Minister of Lands, Irrigation and Power
- In office 1965–1970

Minister of Finance
- In office 28 August 1962 – 8 November 1962
- Prime Minister: Sirimavo Bandaranaike
- Preceded by: Felix Dias Bandaranaike
- Succeeded by: P. B. G. Kalugalla

Member of the Ceylon Parliament for Polonnaruwa
- In office 1952–1960
- Preceded by: P. L. Bauddhasara
- Succeeded by: A. H. de Silva

Member of the Ceylon Parliament for Minneriya
- In office 1960–1970
- Preceded by: Electorate Created
- Succeeded by: Ratna Deshapriya Senanayake

Chairman of the Sri Lanka Freedom Party
- In office 1959–1960
- Preceded by: S. W. R. D. Bandaranaike
- Succeeded by: Sirimavo Bandaranaike

Personal details
- Born: 16 April 1912
- Died: 9 October 1972 (aged 60)
- Party: Sri Lanka Freedom Socialist Party (1964–1972)
- Other political affiliations: Sri Lanka Freedom Party (1952–1964)
- Education: Dharmasoka College; St Thomas' College, Mt. Lavinia; Ceylon University College
- Profession: Civil servant

Charles Percival de Silva (16 April 1912 – 9 October 1972) was a Sri Lankan politician and civil servant. He had served as the Minister of Finance, Minister of Lands, Land Development and Agriculture; and Minister of Power and Irrigation, and Chairperson of the Sri Lanka Freedom Party, and later joined as a senior member of the United National Party.

Born in the southern town of Balapitiya, he was educated at St Thomas' College, Mt. Lavinia and studied mathematics at the Ceylon University College and the University of London. Joining the prestigious Ceylon Civil Service, he served as an Assistant Government Agent in the North Central Province, assisting D. S. Senanayake in his agricultural projects in the province and served as Director of Land Development, in the Ministry of Agriculture under Dudley Senanayake, who succeeded his father as Minister of Agriculture when the latter became the first prime minister of Ceylon. Falling-out with the younger Senanayake, C. P. de Silva resigned from the civil service.

Entering politics from the newly formed Sri Lanka Freedom Party, he played a major role in S. W. R. D. Bandaranaike's landslide victory in the 1956 general elections and became the top cabinet minister. He missed the opportunity to succeed Bandaranaike as prime minister, when the latter was assassinated in 1959 as he himself was in London recovering from a suspect poisoning. Returning to Ceylon he took over the leadership of the Freedom Party, but failed to unite its different fractions and served as the opposition leader for a brief period, before engineering the defeat of the United National Party government led by Dudley Senanayake. But his bid to form a government failed as the Governor General called for fresh elections.

He succeeded in establishing Bandaranaike's widow, Sirima Bandaranaike as the party leader and gaining the party a major victory in the 1960 July general elections. Having been sidelined by Sirima Bandaranaike and her loyalists on caste lines, in December 1964 he led thirteen Freedom Party politicians to cross over to the opposition and defeating the government in parliament resulting in fresh elections which the United National Party won with the support of his new party, the Sri Lanka Freedom Socialist Party and became a minister in the national government that followed. A strong advocate of agriculture and rural development, he played a major role in many of the large agricultural development projects in the North Central Province. He lost his seat in the 1970 general election, after having served in parliament for eighteen consecutive years.

== Early life and education ==
Born in Randombe, Balapitiya to C. R. de Silva, a proctor with a civil practice in Balapitiya and Galle; and Obinamuni Adlin de Silva, he had three brothers and two sisters. His brother A. H. de Silva took over their father's practice and was elected to parliament along with another brother Merril de Silva. His sister Gladys married R. T. de Silva and the other sister Stella became a pediatrician. His brother Dr. L. B. de Silva was a researcher attached to the Medical Research Institute. He was a cousin of socialist politician and renowned lawyer Colvin R. de Silva.

He was educated at Dharmasoka College, Ambalangoda and St Thomas' College, Mt. Lavinia, where he won the Gregory Scholarship, the Miller Award and became head boy. Thereafter he attended the Ceylon University College where he gained a B.Sc. in Mathematics (first Class) in 1933. He thereafter attended University of London for postgraduate studies.

== Civil service ==
Having sat for the Ceylon Civil Service (CCS) entrance exam in the United Kingdom, de Silva was admitted in 1935 and on his return to the island was appointed as a cadet in the Jaffna Kachcheri. At aged 23, he was one of the youngest to gain admission to the CCS. Following his completion of training as a cadet, he was appointed as the Assistant Government Agent (AGA) in Puttalam. He was then selected by D. S. Senanayake, Minister of Agriculture to serve as AGA of the Polonnaruwa District in order to carry forward his agricultural projects in the district. In Polonnaruwa, de Silva served under Richard Aluvihare and played a major role in establishing the Minneriya Colonisation Scheme. Thereafter he was posted as Assistant Secretary to the Minister of Agriculture, assisting Senanayake in his agricultural programs. He was then posted as Assistant Government Agent of the Anuradhapura District. In 1945 he was an Assistant Land Commissioner and in 1949 he was promoted to the post of Director of Land Development, under the then Minister of Agriculture, Dudley Senanayake, who was a contemporary at St Thomas' College, having been two years his senior. However, after a falling out with Dudley Senanayake, he was appointed Assistant Government Agent of the Kalutara District. He resigned shortly thereafter from the Civil Service and retired to his farm in Tabbowa in the Puttalam District becoming a gentleman farmer.

== Political career ==
=== Sri Lanka Freedom Party ===
==== Member of parliament ====
C. P. de Silva was brought into active politics by Herbert Sri Nissanka, who was the secretary of the Sri Lanka Freedom Party. He contested in the general elections in 1952 and was elected to parliament from Polonnaruwa from the Sri Lanka Freedom Party defeating the incumbent P. L. Bauddhasara.

==== Cabinet Minister and Leader of the House ====
He was re-elected in the 1956 general elections and was appointed leader of the house in parliament by S. W. R. D. Bandaranaike who then appointed him to his cabinet as the Minister of Lands, Land Development and Agriculture. In the Bandaranaike cabinet, C. P. de Silva emerged as the most senior member after Bandaranaike and served as acting prime minister during the absence of the latter. In 1957, he personally drove a bulldozer to safely breach the Minneriya tank during the 1957 floods.

He became severely ill at a cabinet meeting on 25 August 1959 after consuming a glass of milk and was flown to the United Kingdom for medical treatment. During his absence Bandaranaike was assassinated on 26 September 1959 and Wijeyananda Dahanayake, who was the acting leader of the house was appointed as prime minister by the Governor General. De Silva returned to the island soon after and was appointed as Minister of Agriculture and Lands in the caretaker cabinet. On 12 December the Freedom Party met and elected De Silva as the new president of the party succeeding Bandaranaike. Thereafter the party executive committee authorized him to request the Governor General to remove Dahanayake and replace him with De Silva as the prime minister of the caretaker government. The Governor General acknowledged receipt of the request but did not act on it. Soon after De Silva resigned from his cabinet ministry.

==== Leader of the Opposition ====
Although not fully recovered, he became the leader of the Sri Lanka Freedom Party and led the party in the 1960 March general elections. Weakened by inter-party rivalries, the Freedom Party was able to gain 46 seats while the United National Party led by Dudley Senanayake gained 50 seats and formed a minority government which lasted only three months. He became the Leader of the Opposition. The government lost the throne speech and Senanayake resigned advising the Governor General to dissolve parliament and call for fresh elections. C. P. de Silva, met the Governor General, Sir Oliver Goonetilleke and stated that he could form a government. Sir Oliver Goonetilleke did not accept de Silva's offer and dissolved the parliament.

==== Minister of Power and Irrigation ====
Sri Lanka Freedom Party selected Bandaranaike's widow, Sirima Bandaranaike as the party leader for the 1960 July general elections. The party won the election and formed a government, with Sirima Bandaranaike becoming the first woman prime minister in the world. C. P. de Silva was appointed the Minister of Power and Irrigation, and leader of the house, once again serving as the senior member of the cabinet until he was surpassed by the Prime Minister's nephew, Felix Dias Bandaranaike who soon became the prominent figure in the government. C. P. de Silva was soon sidelined by the Bandaranaikes based on caste issues. He briefly served as Minister of Finance in 1962. He established two schools in Minneriya; Central College and the Polonnaruwa Royal Central College.

=== Crossing over ===
He soon faced attacks from within his own party and was criticized in parliament by Jaya Pathirana. Citing the Press Take Over Bill which was aimed at taking over its main critic, Associated Newspapers of Ceylon Limited by the government, on 3 December 1964, C. P. de Silva led thirteen SLFP parliamentarians that included Mahanama Samaraweera, P. P. Wickremasuriya, Wijayabahu Wijayasinha, Edmund Wijesuriya, A. H. de Silva, Indrasena de Zoysa, Chandrasena Munaweera, W. G. M. Albert Silva, S. B. Lenawa, Lakshman de Silva, Dr. Edwin Tillekeratne, Sir Razik Fareed, and Robert Singleton-Salmon crossed over to the opposition. The government of Sirima Bandaranaike lost the throne speech by one vote and a general election was called for in March 1965.

=== Sri Lanka Freedom Socialist Party ===
C. P. de Silva formed the Sri Lanka Freedom Socialist Party which in coalition with the United National Party (UNP) contested and won the general elections in 1965. He was appointed Minister of Lands, Irrigation and Power; and the Leader of the House in the new national government of Prime Minister Senanayake. During his tenure, he established the River Valleys Development Board to develop the Udawalawe Project and introduced the Mahaweli Development Authority Act in February 1970 initiating the Mahaweli Development programme. He contested from the Minneriya district from March 1960, and was re-elected in July 1960 and 1965. He lost his seat in the 1970 general elections to Ratna Deshapriya Senanayake, having been a member of parliament for 18 years.

== Death ==
C. P. de Silva died on 9 October 1972. He was a lifelong bachelor. As per his last wishes, his ashes were dispersed in Minneriya. His brother Merril de Silva contested and won from Minneriya in the general elections in 1977.
