= Dehiowita Electoral District =

Former electoral district in Sri Lanka

Dehiowita electoral district was an electoral district of Sri Lanka between August 1947 and July 1977. The district was named after the town of Dehiowita in Kegalle District, Sabaragamuwa Province. The 1978 Constitution of Sri Lanka introduced the proportional representation electoral system for electing members of Parliament. The existing 160 mainly single-member electoral districts were replaced with 22 multi-member electoral districts. Dehiowita electoral district was replaced by the Kegalle multi-member electoral district at the 1989 general elections, the first under the proportional representation system.

== Members of Parliament ==
Key

Independent SLFP UNP LSSP

Election	Member	Party	Term
1947	Reginald Perera	LSSP	1947-52
1952	Edmund Samarakkody	LSSP	1952-56
1956	Edmund Samarakkody	LSSP	1956-60
1960 (March)	Soma Wickremanayake	LSSP	1960
1960 (July)	Soma Wickremanayake	LSSP	1960-65
1965	Dhanapala Weerasekera	LSSP	1965-77
1970	Dhanapala Weerasekera	LSSP	1970-77

== Elections ==
=== 1947 Parliamentary General Election ===
Results of the 1st parliamentary election held between 23 August 1947 and 20 September 1947 for the district:

Candidate	Party	Symbol	Votes	%
Reginald Perera		Chair	6,387	49.11
Mohandas de Mel		Lamp	2,498	19.21
A. J. H. de Thabrew		Cartwheel	1,576	12.12
H. Jayawardena		House	909	6.99
Piyadasa Udabage		Cup	898	6.91
C. W. de Mel		Elephant	303	2.33
Valid Votes			12,571	96.66
Rejected Votes			434	3.34
Total Polled			13,005	100.00
Registered Electors			28,932	
Turnout				44.95

=== 1952 Parliamentary General Election ===
Results of the 2nd parliamentary election held between 24 May 1952 and 30 May 1952 for the district:

Candidate	Party	Symbol	Votes	%
Edmund Samarakkody	Lanka Sama Samaja Party	Star	8,848	46.74
Somaweera Gunasekera		Tree	8,766	46.31
Effie Jayatillaka		Lamp	982	5.19
Valid Votes			18,596	98.23
Rejected Votes			335	1.77
Total Polled			18,931	100.00
Registered Electors			27,177	
Turnout				69.66

=== 1956 Parliamentary General Election ===
Results of the 3rd parliamentary election held between 5 April 1956 and 10 April 1956 for the district:

Candidate	Party	Symbol	Votes	%
Edmund Samarakkody	Lanka Sama Samaja Party	Key	14,954	63.78
C. Dervin Fernando	United National Party	Elephant	8,311	35.44
Valid Votes			23,265	99.22
Rejected Votes			183	0.78
Total Polled			23,448	100.00
Registered Electors			32,694	
Turnout				71.72

=== 1960 (March) Parliamentary General Election ===
Results of the 4th parliamentary election held on 19 March 1960 for the district:

Candidate	Party	Symbol	Votes	%
Soma Wickremanayake	Lanka Sama Samaja Party	Key	6,606	37.07
A. F. Wijemanne	United National Party	Elephant	6,060	34.01
C. P. Ranasinghe	Sri Lanka Freedom Party	Hand	2,072	11.63
A. P. Ranatunge	Mahajana Eksath Peramuna	Cartwheel	1,540	8.64
M. G. Jayawardena		Cockrel	1,198	6.72
M. G. H. Jayawardena		Umbrella	235	1.32
Valid Votes			17,711	99.38
Rejected Votes			110	0.62
Total Polled			17,821	100.00
Registered Electors			23,658	
Turnout				75.33

=== 1960 (July) Parliamentary General Election ===
Results of the 5th parliamentary election held on 20 July 1960 for the district:

Candidate	Party	Symbol	Votes	%
Soma Wickremanayake	Lanka Sama Samaja Party	Key	8,593	50.18
A. F. Wijemanne	United National Party	Elephant	7,990	46.65
Kusumasiri Gunawardena	Mahajana Eksath Peramuna	Cartwheel	481	2.81
Valid Votes			17,064	99.64
Rejected Votes			62	0.36
Total Polled			17,126	100.00
Registered Electors			23,658	
Turnout				72.39

=== 1965 Parliamentary General Election ===
Results of the 6th parliamentary election held on 22 March 1965 for the district:

Candidate	Party	Symbol	Votes	%
Dhanapala Weerasekera		Key	13,299	50.81
Kapilasena Ratnayake	United National Party	Elephant	12,466	47.63
U. E. Perera	Mahajana Eksath Peramuna	Cartwheel	176	0.67
M. G. Jayawardene		Umbrella	76	0.29
Valid Votes			26,017	99.40
Rejected Votes			157	0.60
Total Polled			26,174	100.00
Registered Electors			31,064	
Turnout				84.26

=== 1970 Parliamentary General Election ===
Results of the 7th parliamentary election held on 27 May 1970 for the district:

Candidate	Party	Symbol	Votes	%
Dhanapala Weerasekera	Lanka Sama Samaja Party	Key	17,091	56.07
M. S. Themis	United National Party	Elephant	12,884	42.27
T. H. Fernando	Samajawadi Mahajana Peramuna	Bell	355	1.17
Valid Votes			30,330	99.50
Rejected Votes			153	0.50
Total Polled			30,483	100.00
Registered Electors			34,941	
Turnout				87.24
