= Stephen Samarakkody =

Sri Lankan politician (1919–1968)

Stephen Walter Samarakkody (17 July 1919 – 11 November 1968) was a Sri Lankan politician. He was a member of the Parliament of Sri Lanka from the Polgahawela representing the Sri Lanka Freedom Party (SLFP).

== Early life and background ==
Samarakkody was born into a prominent Radala family of the Kandyan Kingdom. The Samarakkody family traces its lineage to Samanakkody Adigar, who served as Second Adigar under King Kirti Sri Rajasinghe (1747–1782). His ancestors, including Kulatunga Mudali, held high-ranking offices such as Disawa of Wellassa and Rate Rala of Tumpane under King Wimaladharmasuriya II (1687–1707).

His brothers included Edmund Samarakkody and Siripala Samarakkody, both notable figures in Sri Lankan politics.

== Marriage and estate ==
He married Kathalene Vinita "Nita" Senanayake (1924 – 30 May 2002), a member of the influential Senanayake family and niece of F. R. Senanayake, a prominent figure in Sri Lanka’s independence movement.

He inherited Mahalanda Estate and other lands in Kegalle, most of which were later donated. The surviving portion of Mahalanda Estate, along with his residence, remains within the family and falls under the purview of his great-grandson, Iresh Delgoda.

== Political career ==
Samarakkody was elected to parliament from Polgahawela in the March 1960 general election, winning with 6,038 votes. He was re-elected in the July 1960 general election with 9,760 votes. In the 1965 general election, he contested again but was defeated by M. D. Banda with 10,183 votes.

He died in 1968 following a stroke.

== Family and descendants ==
Stephen and Nita Samarakkody had three children:

- Sriyani Samarakkody (b. 27 December 1945), married Mahinda Yatawaka (1939–2023), a planter
  - Nishamani Yatawaka, married Anura Delgoda
    - Iresh Delgoda
    - Maneesha Delgoda
  - Haren Yatawaka, married Dilani Pieris
    - Kiyana Yatawaka
    - Anithra Yatawaka
    - Jaanya Yatawaka
- Nirmala Samarakkody (1947–2021), married Major Shanthi Wickremasinghe
  - Dr. Ayanthi Wickremasinghe
  - Dr. Trishan Wickremasinghe, married Amanda
- Dilkara Samarakkody (b. 8 September 1949), married Shanti Perera (d. 2019), son of Mudliyar H. P. O. Perera of Tangalle
  - Haresh Perera, married Arosha
    - Shanil Perera
    - Shenali Perera
  - Shiara Perera, married Darrel Paiva
    - Dijon Paiva
    - Stefan Paiva
