= Maturata Electoral District =

Electoral district of Sri Lanka

Maturata electoral district was an electoral district of Sri Lanka between August 1947 and March 1960. The district was named after the town of Maturata in Kandy District, Central Province. The 1978 Constitution of Sri Lanka introduced the proportional representation electoral system for electing members of Parliament. The existing 160 mainly single-member electoral districts were replaced with 22 multi-member electoral districts. Maturata electoral district was replaced by the Kandy multi-member electoral district at the 1989 general elections, the first under the proportional representation system.

== Members of Parliament ==
Key

Independent SLFP UNP

| Election | Member | Party | Term |
|---|---|---|---|
| 1947 | M. D. Banda | United National Party | 1947-1952 |
| 1952 | M. D. Banda | United National Party | 1952-1956 |
| 1956 | M. D. Banda | United National Party | 1956-1960 |

== Elections ==
=== 1947 Parliamentary General Election ===
Results of the 1st parliamentary election held between 23 August 1947 and 20 September 1947:

| Candidate | Party | Symbol | Votes | % |
|---|---|---|---|---|
| M. D. Banda | United National Party | Star | 12,438 | 67.44 |
| S. Somasunderam | | Scales | 3,572 | 19.37 |
| I. C. S. Goonatilleke | | Eye | 798 | 4.33 |
| E. W. A. de Silva | | Elephant | 422 | 2.29 |
| [E. Goonawardena | | Hand | 404 | 2.19 |
| I. B. Mani | | Key | 229 | 1.24 |
| Valid Votes | | | 17,863 | 96.86 |
| Rejected Votes | | | 580 | 3.14 |
| Total Polled | | | 18,443 | 100.00 |
| Registered Electors | | | 28,708 | |
| Turnout | | | | 64.24 |

=== 1952 Parliamentary General Election ===
Results of the 2nd parliamentary election held between 24 May 1952 and 30 May 1952:

| Candidate | Party | Symbol | Votes | % |
|---|---|---|---|---|
| M. D. Banda | United National Party | Umbrella | 15,333 | 83.32 |
| I. C. S. Goonatilleke | | Star | 1,122 | 6.10 |
| Charles Barton | | Scales | 941 | 5.11 |
| A. Abeykoon | | Key | 687 | 3.73 |
| Valid Votes | | | 18,083 | 98.27 |
| Rejected Votes | | | 319 | 1.73 |
| Total Polled | | | 18,402 | 100.00 |
| Registered Electors | | | 26,740 | |
| Turnout | | | | 69.52 |

=== 1956 Parliamentary General Election ===
Results of the 3rd parliamentary election held between 5 April 1956 and 10 April 1956:

| Candidate | Party | Symbol | Votes | % |
|---|---|---|---|---|
| M. D. Banda | United National Party | Elephant | 9,523 | 51.23 |
| S. W. Y. B. N. B. Beddewela | Sri Lanka Freedom Party | Hand | 8,083 | 43.48 |
| D. P. A. Jayasekera | | Lamp | 760 | 4.09 |
| Valid Votes | | | 18,366 | 98.80 |
| Rejected Votes | | | 224 | 1.20 |
| Total Polled | | | 18,590 | 100.00 |
| Registered Electors | | | 31,149 | |
| Turnout | | | | 59.68 |
