= Woodlands, Colombo =

Woodlands

General information
- Location: Colombo, Sri Lanka

Woodlands was the town house of D. S. Senanayake and Dudley Senanayake both Prime Ministers of Sri Lanka.

The house was built by D. S. Senanayake in Borella as his principal residence in Colombo and moved in with his family from his family home of Bothale Walawwa. It was at Woodlands, Senanayake was taken into custody under martial law by Punjabi soldiers during the 1915 riots. Even during his tenure as State Council Minister and thereafter Prime Minister D. S. Senanayake remained at Woodlands. Following Senanayake's sudden death in 1952, the house was inherited by his son and political successor Dudley Senanayake who succeeded his father as Prime Minister. He would reside at Woodlands until his death in 1973. Dudley Senanayake's nephew Rukman Senanayake also resided at Woodlands.

== See also ==
- Senanayake family
- Bothale Walawwa
- Grassmere, Colombo
