= Leelaratne =

Leelaratne is a surname. Notable people with the surname include:

- Supun Leelaratne (born 1981), Sri Lankan cricketer
- K. A. Leelaratne Wijesinghe (1923–?), Sri Lankan politician
