= Hanguranketha Electoral District =

Electoral district of Sri Lanka

Hanguranketha electoral district was an electoral district of Sri Lanka between March 1960 and February 1989. The district was named after the town of Hanguranketha in Nuwara Eliya District, Central Province. The 1978 Constitution of Sri Lanka introduced the proportional representation electoral system for electing members of Parliament. The existing 160 mainly single-member electoral districts were replaced with 22 multi-member electoral districts. Hanguranketha electoral district was replaced by the Nuwara Eliya multi-member electoral district at the 1989 general elections.

== Members of Parliament ==
Key

Independent SLFP UNP

Election	Member	Party	Term
1960 (March)	M. D. Banda	United National Party	1960
1960 (July)	M. D. Banda	United National Party	1960-1965
1965	George Abeyagoonasekera	United National Party	1965-1970
1970	P. B. Unantenne	Sri Lanka Freedom Party	1970-1977
1977	George Abeyagoonasekera	United National Party	1977-1989

== Elections ==
=== 1960 (March) Parliamentary General Election ===
Results of the 4th parliamentary election held on 19 March 1960:

Candidate	Party	Symbol	Votes	%
M. D. Banda		Elephant	7,119	48.98
David G. S. Soysa		Star	3,712	25.54
P. B. Unantenne		Clock	2,323	15.98
H. M. P. Banda		Cartwheel	957	6.58
D. P. Abeykoon Jayasekera		Umbrella	190	1.31
Valid Votes			14,301	98.38
Rejected Votes			235	1.62
Total Polled			14,536	100.00
Registered Electors			19,089	
Turnout				76.15

=== 1960 (July) Parliamentary General Election ===
Results of the 5th parliamentary election held on 20 July 1960:

Candidate	Party	Symbol	Votes	%
M. D. Banda	United National Party	Elephant	8,040	53.93
P. B. Unantenne	Sri Lanka Freedom Party	Hand	6,418	43.05
D. G. S. Soysa		Ship	329	2.21
Valid Votes			14,787	99.19
Rejected Votes			121	0.81
Total Polled			14,908	100.00
Registered Electors			19,089	
Turnout				78.10

=== 1965 Parliamentary General Election ===
Results of the 6th parliamentary election held on 22 March 1965:

Candidate	Party	Symbol	Votes	%
George Abeyagoonasekera	United National Party	Elephant	9,164	50.91
P. B. Unantenne	Sri Lanka Freedom Party	Hand	8,207	45.59
D. G. S. Soysa		Butterfly	958	5.32
Valid Votes			17,831	99.06
Rejected Votes			169	0.94
Total Polled			18,000	100.00
Registered Electors			20,470	
Turnout				87.93

=== 1970 Parliamentary General Election ===
Results of the 7th parliamentary election held on 27 May 1970:

Candidate	Party	Symbol	Votes	%
P. B. Unantenne	Sri Lanka Freedom Party	Hand	13,889	56.37
George Abeyagoonasekera	United National Party	Elephant	10,581	42.94
Valid Votes			24,470	99.31
Rejected Votes			169	0.69
Total Polled			24,639	100.00
Registered Electors			27,089	
Turnout				90.96

=== 1977 Parliamentary General Election ===
Results of the 8th parliamentary election held on 21 July 1977:

Candidate	Party	Symbol	Votes	%
George Abeyagoonasekera	United National Party	Elephant	17,750	59.37
P. B. Unantenne	Sri Lanka Freedom Party	Hand	10,750	35.96
V. T .Wijekoon		Butterfly	499	1.67
S. B. Dissanayaka		Star	422	1.41
Alfred Karunatileke		Chair	175	0.59
Nimal Gunasekera		Lamp	121	0.41
Valid Votes			29,717	99.40
Rejected Votes			180	0.60
Total Polled			29,897	100.00
Registered Electors			33,574	
Turnout				89.05
