= Mangala Moonesinghe =

Sri Lankan politician (1931–2016)

Hon. Mangala Moonesinghe

Sri Lankan High Commissioner to the United Kingdom
- In office 2000–2002

Sri Lankan High Commissioner to India
- In office 1995–2000

Member of the Ceylon Parliament for Bulathsinhala
- In office 1965–1977
- Preceded by: Edmund Samarakkody
- Succeeded by: O. S. Perera

Member of Parliament for Kalutara
- In office 1989–1994

Personal details
- Born: Mangala Nath Moonesinghe; 27 July 1931
- Died: 23 July 2016 (aged 84)
- Party: Sri Lanka Freedom Party
- Other political affiliations: Lanka Sama Samaja Party
- Education: Royal College, Colombo
- Occupation: Lawyer, politician
- Profession: Barrister

Mangala Nath Moonesinghe (27 July 1931 – 23 July 2016) was a Sri Lankan lawyer, politician and diplomat. He served as a Member of Parliament for Bulathsinhala electorate between 1965 and 1977, and the Kalutara electorate between 1989 and 1994. He was Sri Lankan High Commissioner to India from 1995 to 2000 and to the United Kingdom from 2000 to 2002.

== Early life and education ==
Born on 27 July 1931, the son of Sanath Moonesinghe, his paternal grandfather was Jacob Moonesinghe from Walgama, Matara married Dona Engeltina Hewawitharana, younger sister of Anagarika Dharmapala. He was a cousin of Anil Moonesinghe and the nephew of Neel Kamal Hewavitharana. He entered Royal College Colombo in 1943 and excelled in athletics as a sprinter, pole vaulter and in cricket. After completing his schooling, he went to London to study law at the Middle Temple and was called to the bar as a barrister.

== Legal career ==
On his return from London, he was enrolled as an advocate of the Supreme Court of Ceylon and started his legal practice which he continued into the 1980s. He lectured on company law at the Ceylon Technical College between 1960 and 1963. In 1975, he was awarded an Eisenhower Fellowship to study space law at Western State University College of Law.

== Political career ==
Drawn to leftist politics with his cousin Anil Moonesinghe he developed a close association with Dr N. M. Perera and Dr Colvin R. de Silva. Moonesinghe contested the 1960 March general elections in the Bulathsinhala electorate from the Lanka Sama Samaja Party (LSSP), but was defeated by Bibile Fonseka from the United National Party. Although the conditions were favorable in the 1960 July general elections, the LSSP selected Edmund Samarakkody to contest Bulathsinhala and he was elected. By 1965, Samarakkody had left the LSSP and Moonesinghe was selected by the party to contest the Bulathsinhala electorate in the 1965 general elections and he was elected to the House of Representatives and was a member of the opposition. He was re-elected from Bulathsinhala in the 1970 general elections and became part of the governing coalition. He left the LSSP in the mid 1970s and joined the Sri Lanka Freedom Party. He was defeated in the 1977 general elections. He contested the 1989 general elections in the Kalutara electorate from the Sri Lanka Freedom Party and was re-elected to parliament. In 1991, he chaired the Parliamentary select committee on the ethnic conflict (known as the Mangala Moonesinghe Committee), gaining consensus among the Sinhala and Tamil members of parliament in the committee. He contested the 1994 general elections, but failed to gain enough preferential votes to be re-elected to parliament, although his party won the election and formed a new government.

== Diplomatic service ==
The Sri Lanka Freedom Party government of Chandrika Kumaratunga appointed Moonesinghe as Sri Lankan High Commissioner to India in 1995 and he served till 2000, when he was appointed Sri Lankan High Commissioner to the United Kingdom, where he served until 2002, when the Sri Lanka Freedom Party government was defeated in the 2001 general elections.

== Later life ==
Following his return from the United Kingdom; he served as chair of the One Text Initiative, Chairman of Marga Institute and was a director of the Carson Cumberbatch & Co. He died in 2016 at the age of 84.

== Personal life ==
Moonesinghe was married to Jocelyn Granjon and had a daughter. He later married Gnana Coomaraswamy. They had a son and a daughter. They lived at Park Road, Battaramulla, before settling at Havelock City. Dr Kumaran Ratnam was his brother-in-law.

== See also ==
- List of political families in Sri Lanka
- Sri Lankan Non Career Diplomats

Diplomatic posts
| Preceded by ? | Sri Lanka's High Commissioner to the United Kingdom; 1995–2000 | Succeeded by ? |
| Preceded by ? | Sri Lanka's High Commissioner to the United Kingdom; 2000–2001 | Succeeded by ? |
