= Polonnaruwa Electoral District (1947–1989) =

Electoral district of Sri Lanka

Polonnaruwa electoral district was an electoral district of Sri Lanka between August 1947 and February 1989. The district was named after the town of Polonnaruwa in Polonnaruwa District, North Central Province. The 1978 Constitution of Sri Lanka introduced the proportional representation electoral system for electing members of Parliament. The existing 160 mainly single-member electoral districts were replaced with 22 multi-member electoral districts. Polonnaruwa electoral district was replaced by the Polonnaruwa multi-member electoral district at the 1989 general elections, the first under the proportional representation system, Polonnaruwa continues to be a polling division of the multi-member electoral district.

== Members of Parliament ==
Key

Independent SLFP UNP

Election	Member	Party	Term
1947	P. L. Bauddhasara	UNP	1947 - 1952
1952	C. P. de Silva	SLFP	1952 - 1956
1956	C. P. de Silva	SLFP	1956 - 1960
1960 (March)	A. H. de Silva	SLFP	1960
1960 (July)	A. H. de Silva	SLFP	1960 - 1965
1965	K. A. Leelaratne Wijesinghe	SLFP	1965 - 1970
1970	K. A. Leelaratne Wijesinghe	SLFP	1970 -1977
1977	H. G. P. Nelson	UNP	1977 - 1989

== Elections ==
=== 1947 Parliamentary General Election ===
Results of the 1st parliamentary election held between 23 August 1947 and 20 September 1947:

Candidate	Party	Symbol	Votes	%
P. L. Bauddhasara	United National Party	Lamp	1,604	44.87
R. B. Wijeratne	United National Party	House	830	23.22
M. S. Abubucker	Lanka Sama Samaja Party	Elephant	818	22.88
S. M. Ismail	United National Party	Pair of Scales	108	3.02
P. D. S. Jayasekera	United National Party	Cup	68	1.90
S. Seneviratne	United National Party	Hand	45	1.26
Valid Votes			3,473	97.15
Rejected Votes			102	2.85
Total Polled			3,575	100.00
Registered Electors			5,838	
Turnout				61.24

=== 1952 Parliamentary General Election ===
Results of the 2nd parliamentary election held between 24 May 1952 and 30 May 1952:

Candidate	Party	Symbol	Votes	%
C. P. de Silva	Sri Lanka Freedom Party	Elephant	5,498	64.24
P. L. Bauddhasara	United National Party	Lamp	2,856	33.37
Ariyawansa Goonasekara	Communist Party	Star	129	1.51
Valid Votes			8,483	99.11
Rejected Votes			76	0.89
Total Polled			8,559	100.00
Registered Electors			15,796	
Turnout				54.19

=== 1956 Parliamentary General Election ===
Results of the 3rd parliamentary election held between 5 April 1956 and 10 April 1956:

Candidate	Party	Symbol	Votes	%
C. P. de Silva		Hand	10,072	68.64
G. Lionel Kotalawala		Elephant	3,948	26.91
D. J. Kuruppu		Eye	479	3.26
Valid Votes			14,499	98.81
Rejected Votes			174	1.19
Total Polled			14,673	100.00
Registered Electors			26,727	
Turnout				54.90

=== 1960 (March) Parliamentary General Election ===
Results of the 4th parliamentary election held on 19 March 1960:

Candidate	Party	Symbol	Votes	%
A. H. de Silva	Sri Lanka Freedom Party	Hand	7,107	54.00
P. L. Bauddhasara	United National Party	Elephant	3,981	30.25
K. A. Leelaratne Wijesinghe		Key	989	7.52
D. B. W. Yapa		Cartwheel	438	3.33
A. Suriya Arachchi		Umbrella	412	3.13
Y. W. Peiris		Lamp	107	1.29
Valid Votes			13,034	99.04
Rejected Votes			127	0.96
Total Polled			13,161	100.00
Registered Electors			17,654	
Turnout				74.55

=== 1960 (July) Parliamentary General Election ===
Results of the 5th parliamentary election held on 20 July 1960:

Candidate	Party	Symbol	Votes	%
A. H. de Silva	Sri Lanka Freedom Party	Hand	7,540	58.26
P. L. Bauddhasara	United National Party	Elephant	5,321	41.12
Valid Votes			12,861	99.38
Rejected Votes			80	0.62
Total Polled			12,941	100.00
Registered Electors			17,654	
Turnout				73.30

=== 1965 Parliamentary General Election ===
Results of the 6th parliamentary election held on 22 March 1965:

Candidate	Party	Symbol	Votes	%
K. A. Leelaratne Wijesinghe	Sri Lanka Freedom Party	Hand	7,840	44.31
A. H. de Silva	Lanka Prajathanthravadi Pakshaya	Sun	5,988	33.85
P. L. Bauddhasara	Independent	Lamp	3,773	21.33
Valid Votes			17,501	98.92
Rejected Votes			191	
Total Polled			17,692	100.00
Registered Electors			22,938	
Turnout				77.13

=== 1970 Parliamentary General Election ===
Results of the 7th parliamentary election held on 27 May 1970:

Candidate	Party	Symbol	Votes	%
K. A. Leelaratne Wijesinghe	Sri Lanka Freedom Party	Hand	11,927	52.30
Merril de Silva	United National Party	Elephant	10,802	47.36
Valid Votes			22,729	99.66
Rejected Votes			78	0.34
Total Polled			22,807	100.00
Registered Electors			27,452	
Turnout				83.08

=== 1977 Parliamentary General Election ===
Results of the 8th parliamentary election held on 21 July 1977:

Candidate	Party	Symbol	Votes	%
H. G. P. Nelson	United National Party	Elephant	14,941	58.80
K. A. Leelaratne Wijesinghe	Sri Lanka Freedom Party	Hand	9,926	39.06
M. M. A. Shelton Moraes		Ladder	219	0.86
H. A. Wipulasena		Star	120	0.47
G. A. K. Arnolis Appu		Lamp	67	0.26
D. G. Saranelis Dayawansa		Tree	37	0.15
L. S. Wimalasekera Silva		Clock	32	0.13
Valid Votes			25,342	99.73
Rejected Votes			69	0.27
Total Polled			25,411	100.00
Registered Electors			30,631	
Turnout				82.96
