= Reginald Perera =

Sri Lankan Trotskyist politician

Ranawaka Arachchige Arthur Reginald Perera (1 December 1915 - 19 November 1977) was a Sri Lankan Trotskyist politician.

Perera received his education at St. John's College, Panadura. In the 1930s he joined the Lanka Sama Samaja Party, actively engaging in the youth league activities of the party. In the late 1930s Perera represented the LSSP at the sessions of the Indian National Congress in Tripura. During World War II, he was imprisoned for over three years by the British for undermining the war effort along with Colvin R. de Silva and N. M. Perera.

In 1947 Perera ran in the 1st parliamentary election in the Dehiowita electorate, where he was elected, receiving 6,387 votes (49.1% of the total vote), defeating five other candidates. He chose not to seek re-election at the subsequent parliamentary elections in 1952 in order to allow Edmund Samarakkody to take his place. Instead he ran in the Ratnapura electorate, where he lost to the sitting member, C. E. Attygalle by 1,811 votes. At the 3rd parliamentary election held April 1956, Perera contested the seat of Matugama. He was unsuccessful in his challenge polling 3,920 votes (10.7% of the total vote) finishing third. In 1959 he was elected as a member of the Senate of Ceylon, representing the Mahajana Eksath Peramuna (People's United Front). He remained a senator until 1971, serving two terms, after which he was appointed as Ceylon's Ambassador to Egypt.

== See also ==
- List of Sri Lankan non-career diplomats
