= H. G. P. Nelson =

Sri Lankan Politician

Hewa Gajaman Paththinige Nelson (1932–2001) was a Sri Lankan politician. He is a Member of Parliament for the Polonnaruwa and former Cabinet Minister.

A member of the United National Party since 1956, Nelson served as the Chairman of Polonnaruwa Town Council and was elected to parliament in the 1977 Sri Lankan parliamentary election from Polonnaruwa defeating K. A. Leelaratne Wijesinghe of the Sri Lanka Freedom Party. He was re-elected in the 1994 Sri Lankan parliamentary election. He was appointed District Minister for Trincomalee in 1978.

His son Kins Nelson is a current member of parliament and his daughter Sujeewa Nelson is married to General Shavendra Silva.
