= George Abeyagoonasekera =

Ceylonese politician (1915-?)

George Abeyagoonasekera (22 January 1915 – unknown) was a Ceylonese politician. He was the member of Parliament of Sri Lanka from Hanguranketha representing the United National Party. He was defeated in the by P. B. Unantenne in the 1970 general election. He was married to Rose Dagmar Seneviratne.
