= P. B. Unantenne =

Ceylonese politician

Punchi Banda Unantenne

Member of Parliament for Hanguranketha
- In office 1970–1977

Personal details
- Born: September 13, 1913 Ceylon
- Party: Sri Lanka Freedom Party
- Occupation: Politician

Punchi Banda Unantenne (born 13 September 1913) was a Ceylonese politician. He was the member of Parliament of Sri Lanka from Hanguranketha representing the Sri Lanka Freedom Party from 1970 to 1977. He was defeated in the general elections in March 1960, July 1960, 1965 and 1977.
