= A. H. de Silva =

Ceylonese lawyer and politician

A. H. de Silva was a Ceylonese lawyer and politician. He was a Member of Parliament from the Polonnaruwa district from 1960 to 1964. He was deafted in the 1965 general election. Educated at St Thomas' College, Mt. Lavinia and the Ceylon Law College, he took over his father's practice as a proctor in Balapitiya and Galle. He was the brother of C. P. de Silva and Merril de Silva, as well as the cousin of Colvin R. de Silva.
