= K. A. Leelaratne Wijesinghe =

Sri Lankan politician (1923–1900s)

Kuruppu Appuhamillage Leelaratne Wijesinghe (21 November 1923 – 1900s) was a Sri Lankan politician. He was a member of Parliament of Sri Lanka from Polonnaruwa representing the Sri Lanka Freedom Party.

He first contested from Polonnaruwa in the March 1960 general election, and polled third. He was able to win the 1965 general election to A. H. de Silva and was re-elected in the 1970 general election. He defeated in the 1977 general election by H. G. P. Nelson.
