= P. L. Bauddhasara =

Ceylonese politician

Hon. P. L. Bauddhasara MP

Member of the Ceylon Parliament for Polonnaruwa
- In office 1947–1952
- Preceded by: seat created
- Succeeded by: C. P. de Silva

Personal details
- Born: Pussewela Liyanage Bauddhasara; 1 June 1915
- Died: Ceylon
- Party: United National Party
- Occupation: Politics

Pussewela Liyanage Bauddhasara (born 1 June 1915) was a Ceylonese politician.

In 1947 Bauddhasara was elected to the Parliament of Ceylon at the 1st parliamentary election, in the Polonnaruwa electorate, representing the United National Party. He secured 1,604 votes (45% of the total vote), defeating five other candidates to win the seat.
