= Dedigama Electoral District =

Electoral district of Sri Lanka

Dedigama electoral district was an electoral district of Sri Lanka between August 1947 and February 1989. The district was named after the town of Dedigama in Kegalle District, Sabaragamuwa Province. The 1978 Constitution of Sri Lanka introduced the proportional representation electoral system for electing members of Parliament. The existing 160 mainly single-member electoral districts were replaced with 22 multi-member electoral districts. Dedigama electoral district was replaced by the Kegalle multi-member electoral district at the 1989 general elections, the first under the proportional representation system.

== Members of Parliament ==
Key

Independent UNP MEP

Election	Member	Party	Term
1947	Dudley Senanayake	United National Party	1947-1952
1952	Dudley Senanayake	United National Party	1952-1956
1956	Maithripala Herath	Mahajana Eksath Peramuna	1956-1960
1960 (March)	Dudley Senanayake	United National Party	1960
1960 (July)	Dudley Senanayake	United National Party	1960-1965
1965	Dudley Senanayake	United National Party	1965-1970
1970	Dudley Senanayake	United National Party	1970-1973
1973 (by-election)	Rukman Senanayake	United National Party	1973-1977
1977	Nissanka Wijeyeratne	United National Party	1977-1989

== Elections ==
=== 1947 Parliamentary General Election ===
Results of the 1st parliamentary election held between 23 August 1947 and 20 September 1947:

Candidate	Party	Symbol	Votes	%
Dudley Senanayake	United National Party	Hand	20,170	85.14
B. J. Fernando		Elephant	3,308	13.96
Valid Votes			23,478	99.10
Rejected Votes			213	0.90
Total Polled			23,691	100.00
Registered Electors			29,556	
Turnout				80.16

=== 1952 Parliamentary General Election ===
Results of the 2nd parliamentary election held between 24 May 1952 and 30 May 1952:

Candidate	Party	Symbol	Votes	%
Dudley Senanayake	United National Party	Elephant	21,206	75.13
Hector Wijetunga		Star	5,647	20.01
Darrell Peiris	Sri Lanka Freedom Party	Hand	1,136	4.02
Valid Votes			27,989	99.16
Rejected Votes			237	0.84
Total Polled			28,226	100.00
Registered Electors			34,764	
Turnout				81.19

=== 1956 Parliamentary General Election ===
Results of the 3rd parliamentary election held between 5 April 1956 and 10 April 1956:

Candidate	Party	Symbol	Votes	%
Maithripala Herath	Sri Lanka Freedom Party	Hand	22,816	77.26
Wimala I. Kannangara	United National Party	Elephant	6,360	21.54
W. A. Munasinghe		Umbrella	191	0.65
Valid Votes			29,367	99.44
Rejected Votes			164	0.56
Total Polled			29,531	100.00
Registered Electors			39,972	
Turnout				73.88

=== 1960 (March) Parliamentary General Election ===
Results of the 4th parliamentary election held on 19 March 1960:

Candidate	Party	Symbol	Votes	%
Dudley Senanayake	United National Party	Elephant	12,208	49.52
W. A. Munasinghe	Sri Lanka Freedom Party	Hand	5,629	22.83
Athauda Seneviratne	Lanka Sama Samaja Party	Key	4,383	17.78
Maithripala Herath		Cartwheel	2,289	9.28
Valid Votes			24,509	99.41
Rejected Votes			146	0.59
Total Polled			24,655	100.00
Registered Electors			29,061	
Turnout				84.84

=== 1960 (July) Parliamentary General Election ===
Results of the 5th parliamentary election held on 20 July 1960:

Candidate	Party	Symbol	Votes	%
Dudley Senanayake	United National Party	Elephant	13,340	53.12
Deshapriya Senanayake	Sri Lanka Freedom Party	Hand	11,683	46.52
Valid Votes			25,023	99.63
Rejected Votes			92	0.37
Total Polled			25,115	100.00
Registered Electors			29,061	
Turnout				86.42

=== 1965 Parliamentary General Election ===
Results of the 6th parliamentary election held on 22 March 1965:

Candidate	Party	Symbol	Votes	%
Dudley Senanayake	United National Party	Elephant	17,987	55.02
Deshapriya Senanayake	Sri Lanka Freedom Party	Hand	14,558	44.53
Valid Votes			32,545	99.54
Rejected Votes			149	0.46
Total Polled			32,694	100.00
Registered Electors			36,072	
Turnout				90.64

=== 1970 Parliamentary General Election ===
Results of the 7th parliamentary election held on 27 May 1970:

Candidate	Party	Symbol	Votes	%
Dudley Senanayake	United National Party	Elephant	19,513	51.29
Dharmasiri Senanayake	Sri Lanka Freedom Party	Hand	18,446	48.48
Valid Votes			37,959	99.77
Rejected Votes			89	0.23
Total Polled			38,048	100.00
Registered Electors			41,595	
Turnout				91.47

=== 1973 Parliamentary by-election ===
Following the death of Dudley Senanayake in April 1973 a by-election for the seat of Dedigama was held on 9 July 1973:

Candidate	Party	Symbol	Votes	%
Rukman Senanayake	United National Party	Elephant	23,306	54.61
Dharmasiri Senanayake	Sri Lanka Freedom Party	Hand	18,798	44.05
Sirisena Rajapakse		Chair	227	0.53
J. D. Sugathadasa		Lamp	205	0.48
Valid Votes			42,536	99.67
Rejected Votes			139	0.33
Total Polled			42,675	100.00
Registered Electors				
Turnout				

=== 1977 Parliamentary General Election ===
Results of the 8th parliamentary election held on 21 July 1977:

Candidate	Party	Symbol	Votes	%
Nissanka Wijeyeratne	United National Party	Elephant	24,436	54.07
Dharmasiri Senanayake	Sri Lanka Freedom Party	Hand	17,704	39.18
A. R. Victor Rajapakse		Chair	2,071	4.58
M. J. F. Ratnayake		Key	829	1.83
A. R. Wijeratne		Ladder	152	0.34
Valid Votes			45,050	99.69
Rejected Votes			124	0.31
Total Polled			45,192	100.00
Registered Electors			50,729	
Turnout				89.09
