= C. E. Attygalle =

Ceylonese politician (1905–1980)

Hon. Cyril Eugene Attygalle MP

Member of the Ceylon Parliament for Ratnapura
- In office 1947–1956
- Preceded by: seat created
- Succeeded by: Jayaweera Kuruppu

Personal details
- Born: 6 February 1905 Weralupe, Ratnapura
- Died: 30 April 1980 (aged 75)
- Party: United National Party
- Spouse: Brenhilde
- Children: Tissa, Aoka, Nelum
- Education: St. Joseph's College, Colombo, Ananda College, Colombo

Cyril Eugene Attygalle (6 February 1905 – 30 April 1980) was a Ceylonese politician.

Cyril Eugene Attygalle was born 6 February 1905 in Weralupe, Ratnapura, the sixth in a family of eleven (nine sons and two daughters), to Don Louis Attygalle, was a shroff and later Mudaliyar at the Ratnapura Kachcheri, and Dolicia Jane Haddagoda. His elder brother Nicholas Attygalle was the President of the Senate of Ceylon (1953 – 1960) and the first Ceylonese Vice-Chancellor of the University of Ceylon.

Attygalle received his education at St. Joseph’s College and Ananda College in Colombo. In 1926 he joined the Ceylon Police Force as a Sub-inspector but resigned six months later and took up planting in Gilimale North. He lived in Colombo and engaged in business as a Produce Broker between 1934 and 1940. In 1936 he married Brenhilde and they had three children. In 1944 he was elected to the Ratnapura Urban Council, representing the Weralupe Ward.

Attygalle was elected to parliament, as the member for the Ratnapura electorate, at the 1st parliamentary election held between 23 August 1947 and 20 September 1947, representing the United National Party. He received 6,603 votes (50% of the total vote), which was 1,799 votes ahead of his nearest rival, A. H. Wijetunge, the Lanka Sama Samaja Party candidate. He was appointed as the Parliamentary secretary to the Minister of Trade and Commerce in the D. S. Senanayake cabinet.

Attygalle was one of the parliamentary members of the Kandyan Peasantry Commission, one of the first Royal Commissions established by the first post-Independence Prime Minister D. S. Senanayake in January 1949, replacing M. D. Banda upon his appointment as a Cabinet Minister. The Commission was convened to investigate the social and economic life of the Kandyan peasantry in the Central and Uva Provinces and to determine what measures should be adopted to ameliorate their condition.

He successfully re-contested the seat at 2nd parliamentary election, held between 24 May 1952 and 30 May 1952, increasing his margin to 53.8% of the total vote, 1,811 votes in front of the other candidate for the seat. He was subsequently appointed the Parliamentary secretary to the Minister of Health in the first Dudley Senanayake and Kotelawala cabinets. In 1952 he represented the country at the World Health Organization.

Attygalle ran again in the 3rd parliamentary election, held between 5 April 1956 and 10 April 1956, however this time he failed to retain the seat of Ratnapura losing to the Sri Lanka Freedom Party candidate, Jayaweera Kuruppu, by 10,358 votes, only managing to secure 26.7% of the total vote.
