= Polgahawela Electoral District =

Electoral district of Sri Lanka

Polgahawela electoral district was an electoral district of Sri Lanka between March 1960 and February 1989. The district was named after the town of Polgahawela in Kurunegala District, North Western Province. The 1978 Constitution of Sri Lanka introduced the proportional representation electoral system for electing members of Parliament. The existing 160 mainly single-member electoral districts were replaced with 22 multi-member electoral districts. Polgahawela electoral district was replaced by the Kurunegala multi-member electoral district at the 1989 general elections.

== Members of Parliament ==
Key

Independent SLFP UNP

Election	Member	Party	Term
1960 (March)	Stephen Samarakkody	Sri Lanka Freedom Party	1960
1960 (July)	Stephen Samarakkody	Sri Lanka Freedom Party	1960-1965
1965	M. D. Banda	United National Party	1956-1970
1970	Maithripala Herath	Sri Lanka Freedom Party	1970-1977
1977	J. A. D. S. R. Jayakody	United National Party	1977-1989

== Elections ==
=== 1960 (March) Parliamentary General Election ===
Results of the 4th parliamentary election held on 19 March 1960:

Candidate	Party	Symbol	Votes	%
Stephen Samarakkody	Sri Lanka Freedom Party	Hand	6,038	33.45
D. B. Welagedara	United National Party	Elephant	5,901	32.69
Susil Moonesinghe	Mahajana Eksath Peramuna	Cartwheel	2,079	11.52
P. S. Alfred	Lanka Sama Samaja Party	Key	1,841	10.20
Dhanapala Kaluhendiwela	Independent	Book	754	4.18
Kalyanaratne Hemachandra	Lanka Prajathanthravadi Pakshaya	Umbrella	410	2.27
Albert Galapatti		Scales	407	2.25
T. B. Potuhera	Independent	Spectacles	208	1.15
P. B. Balasooriya	United Front	Clock	168	0.93
P. B. Amarasinghe	Independent	Eye	111	0.62
Valid Votes			17,917	99.25
Rejected Votes			136	0.75
Total Polled			18,053	100.00
Registered Electors			22,288	
Turnout				80.10

=== 1960 (July) Parliamentary General Election ===
Results of the 5th parliamentary election held on 20 July 1960:

Candidate	Party	Symbol	Votes	%
Stephen Samarakkody	Sri Lanka Freedom Party	Hand	9,760	54.03
D. B. Welagedara	United National Party	Elephant	7,938	43.95
Ariyadasa Sikurajapati		Cartwheel	301	1.67
Valid Votes			17,999	99.65
Rejected Votes			64	0.35
Total Polled			18,063	100.00
Registered Electors			22,288	
Turnout				81.04

=== 1965 Parliamentary General Election ===
Results of the 6th parliamentary election held on 22 March 1965:

Candidate	Party	Symbol	Votes	%
M. D. Banda	United National Party	Elephant	10,928	45.74
Stephen Samarakkody	Sri Lanka Freedom Party	Hand	10,183	42.62
H. Herath Banda		Umbrella	2,695	11.28
Valid Votes			23,806	99.64
Rejected Votes			85	0.36
Total Polled			23,891	100.00
Registered Electors			27,684	
Turnout				86.30

=== 1970 Parliamentary General Election ===
Results of the 7th parliamentary election held on 27 May 1970:

Candidate	Party	Symbol	Votes	%
Maithripala Herath	Sri Lanka Freedom Party	Hand	16,243	58.65
M. D. Banda	United National Party	Elephant	11,358	41.01
Valid Votes			27,601	99.66
Rejected Votes			95	0.34
Total Polled			27,696	100.00
Registered Electors			31,044	
Turnout				89.22

=== 1977 Parliamentary General Election ===
Results of the 8th parliamentary election held on 21 July 1977:

Candidate	Party	Symbol	Votes	%
J. A. D. S. R. Jayakody	United National Party	Elephant	20,128	55.17
Maithripala Herath	Sri Lanka Freedom Party	Hand	15,607	42.78
Kithsiri Senaratne		Key	378	1.04
A. A. Siri Amarasinghe		Lamp	156	0.43
D. M. Rajapakse		Chair	117	0.32
Valid Votes			36,386	99.74
Rejected Votes			95	0.26
Total Polled			36,481	100.00
Registered Electors			40,614	
Turnout				89.82
