= Merril de Silva =

Ceylonese politician

Merril de Silva was a Ceylonese lawyer and politician. He was a Member of Parliament from the Minneriya district from 1977 to 1989. He unsuccessfully contested the Polonnaruwa district in the 1970 general elections from the United National Party, but was successful in the 1977 general elections from the Minneriya district. He was the brother of C. P. de Silva and A. H. de Silva, as well as the cousin of Colvin R. de Silva.
