= Rukman Senanayake =

Sri Lankan politician (1948–2024)

Hon. Rukman Senanayake
- Senanayake in 2008

Personal details
- Born: 21 June 1948 Colombo, Ceylon
- Died: 24 August 2024 (aged 76)
- Party: United National Party
- Occupation: Politician

Rukman Senanayake (21 June 1948 – 24 August 2024) was a Sri Lankan politician. A Cabinet Minister of Environment and Natural Resources from 2002 to 2004 and Member of Parliament for Kegalle District, he was a Vice Leader of the United National Party.

== Early life and family ==
Rukman Senanayake was born on 21 June 1948 as the third son of Robert Parakrama Senanayake and Swarna Neela Senanayake, both cousins of the Senanayake family, a prominent political family that dominated the post-independence years of Sri Lanka. His paternal grandfather, D. S. Senanayake was the first Prime Minister of Ceylon and his maternal grandfather, F. R. Senanayake, elder brother of D. S. Senanayake, was a leading figure in the Ceylonese independence movement. His paternal uncle, Dudley Senanayake, served as Prime Minister of Ceylon for four terms, and his maternal uncle, R.G. Senanayake served as the Cabinet Minister of Trade and Commerce during the period 1952–53, and also during the period 1956–60 in SWRD Bandaranaike's government. His father, Robert Senanayake, was the Chairman of Freudenberg & Co. (Ceylon) Ltd., which owned Freudenberg Shipping Agencies and the Toyota dealership in Ceylon. He had one elder brother, Devinda, and two sisters, Ranjini and Yasmin. The family hailed from Bothale Walawwa in Mihirigama. He was educated at S. Thomas' College, Mount Lavinia.

== Political career ==
Senanayake first entered the Parliament of Sri Lanka in 1973 from the United National Party, representing the Dedigama electorate following the death of his uncle, Dudley Senanayake. He remained a Member of Parliament until 1977 but did not contest the 1977 General Elections. He formed the Eksath Lanka Janatha Party in 1987 and contested to the Kegalle District unsuccessfully through it in the 1989 General Election. In 1990 he rejoined the United National Party. In 1994, Senanayake entered Parliament from the United National Party for the second time. He remained a Member of Parliament, representing the Polonnaruwa District until 2001. Again, in 2001, he entered Parliament from Kegalle District and was appointed Cabinet Minister of Environment and Natural Resources in the United National Party government. Senanayake held the portfolio of Cabinet Minister until 2004. He re-entered Parliament in the 2004 General Elections. He was appointed the United National Party Chairman in 2007 and Vice Leader in 2008. In the 2010 General Election his name was in the National List of the United National Party but he was not appointed to the Parliament following the General Election. He contested through the United National Party for the Kegalle District in the 2015 General Election and did not receive enough preferetial votes to enter Parliament.

== Death ==
Senanayake died on 24 August 2024, at the age of 76.

== See also ==
- List of political families in Sri Lanka
