= Bothale Ihalagama =

Bothale Ihalagama බෝතලේ ඉහලගම
- Location within Sri Lanka
- Coordinates: 7°14′50″N 80°9′45″E
- Country: Sri Lanka
- Province: Western Province, Sri Lanka

Bothale Ihalagama is a village in Gampaha District, Western Province, Sri Lanka. It is 4 kilometres (2.5 mi) from Mirigama. Bothale Ihalagama is the home of Sri Lanka's first Prime Minister D.S. Senanayake.

== Notable places ==
- Bothale Walawwa
- Unudiya ella
- Kinithulagala Aranya Senasanaya
- Kinthulagala Aranya Senasana is a Theravada Tripitaka teaching seminary affiliated with the Sri Kalyani Yogashrama Corporation and is located in the Vilikulakanda Reserve.

== Temples ==
Within Bothale Ihalagama is Sri Ghotabhaya Rajamaha Viharaya. Built by King Ghotabhaya, it is one of Sri Lankan's oldest temples.

== Schools ==
Bothale Kanishta Vidyalaya is a school within Bothale Ihalagama.

== Gallery ==
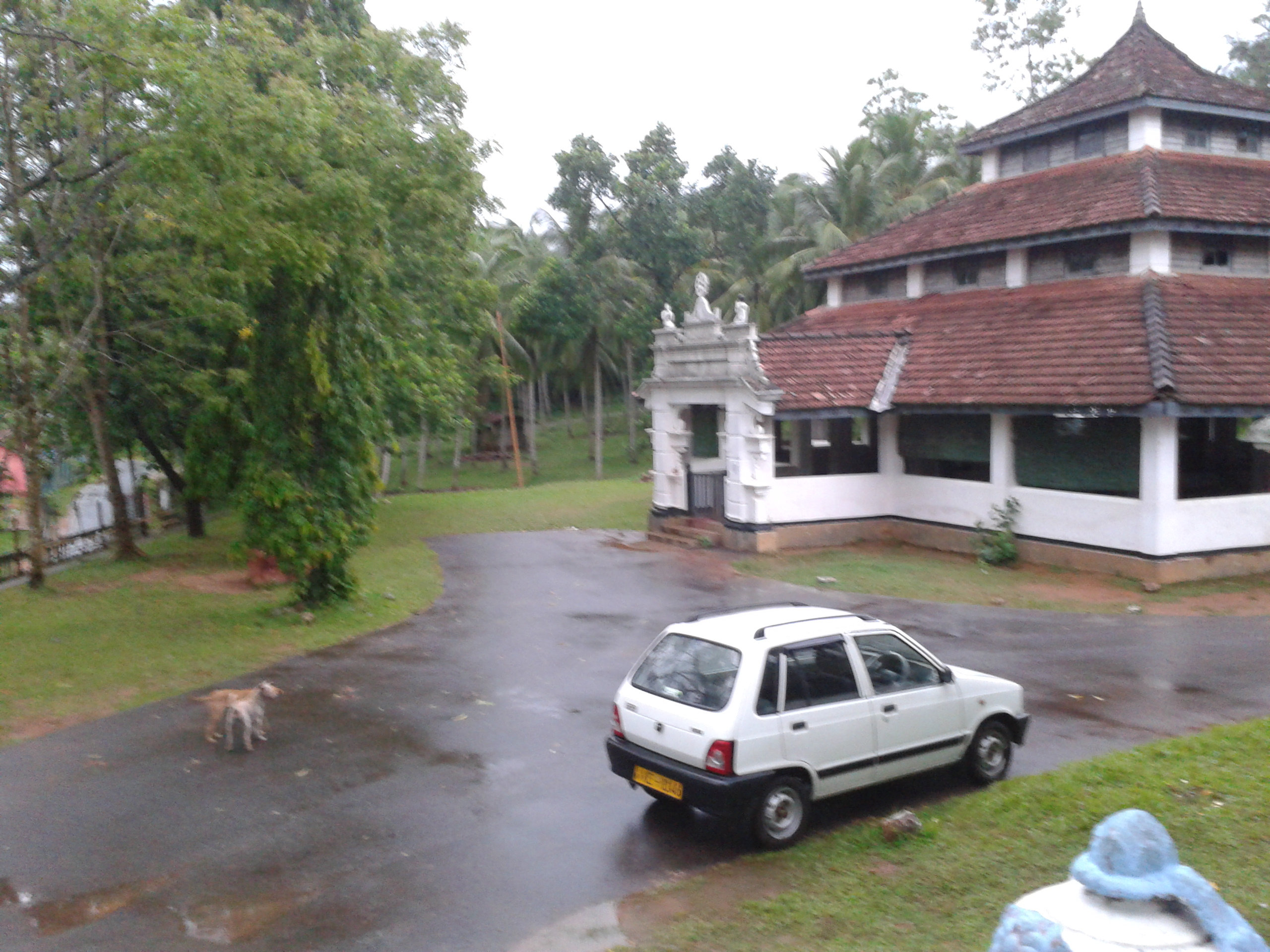

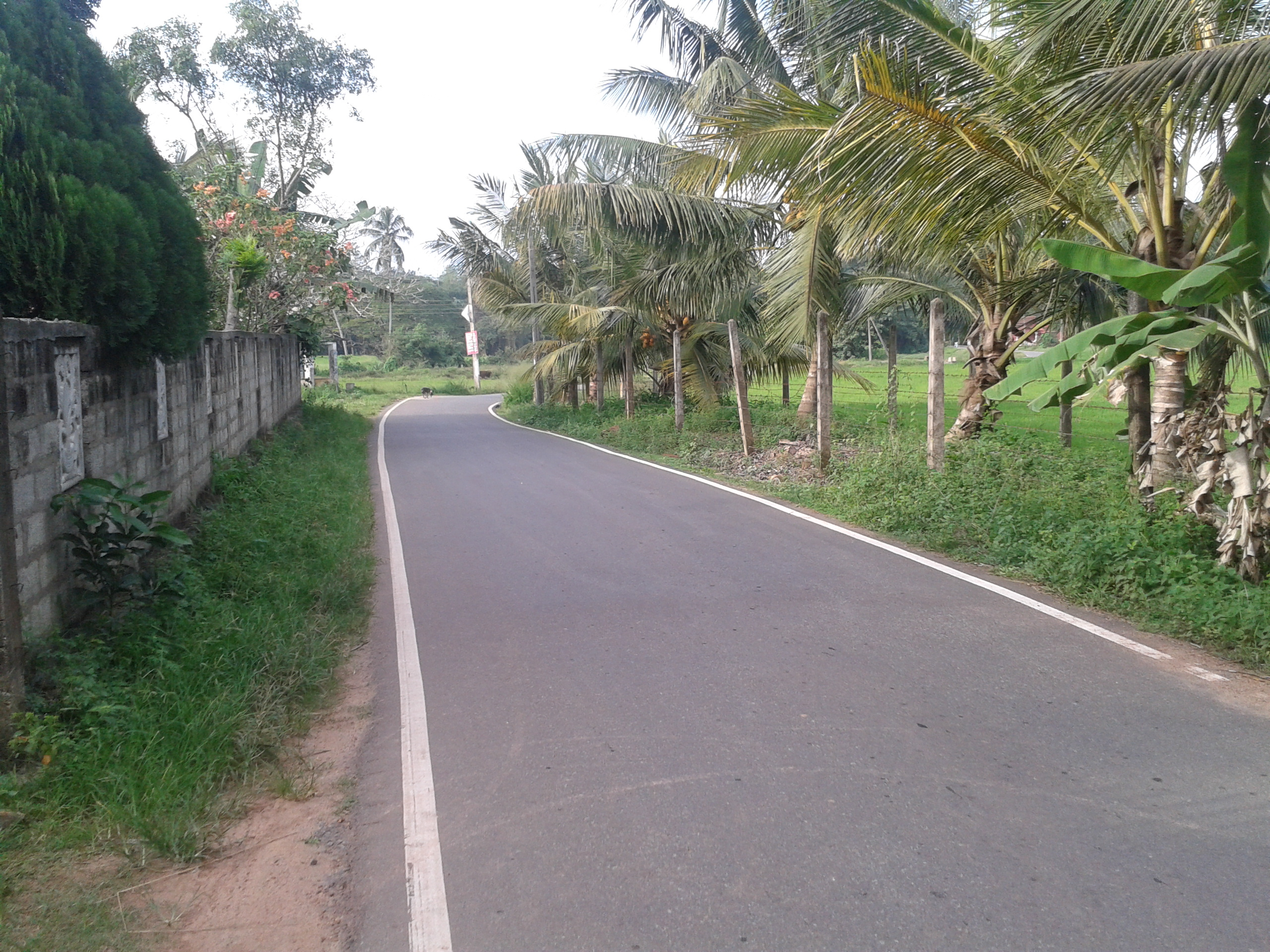

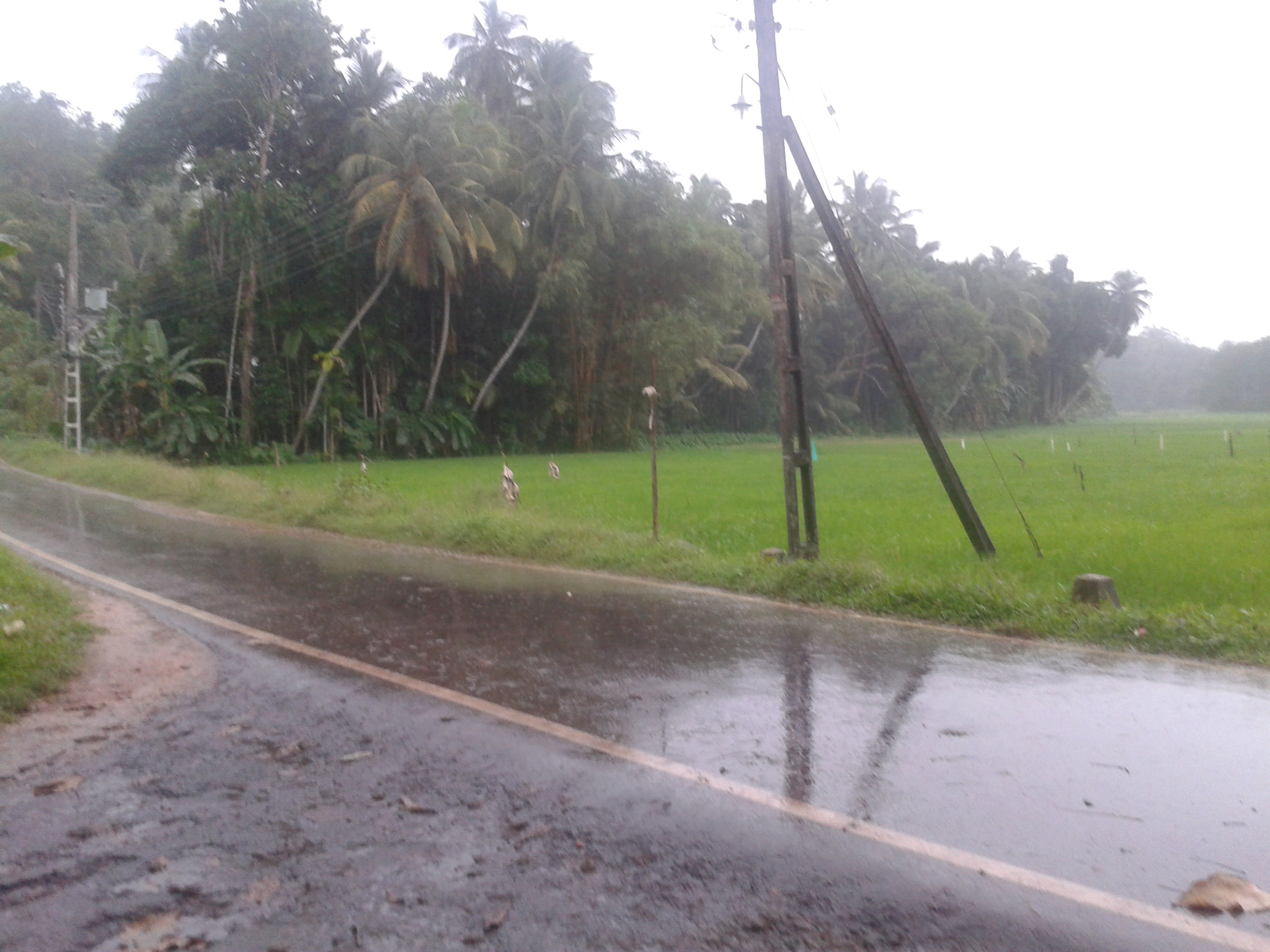

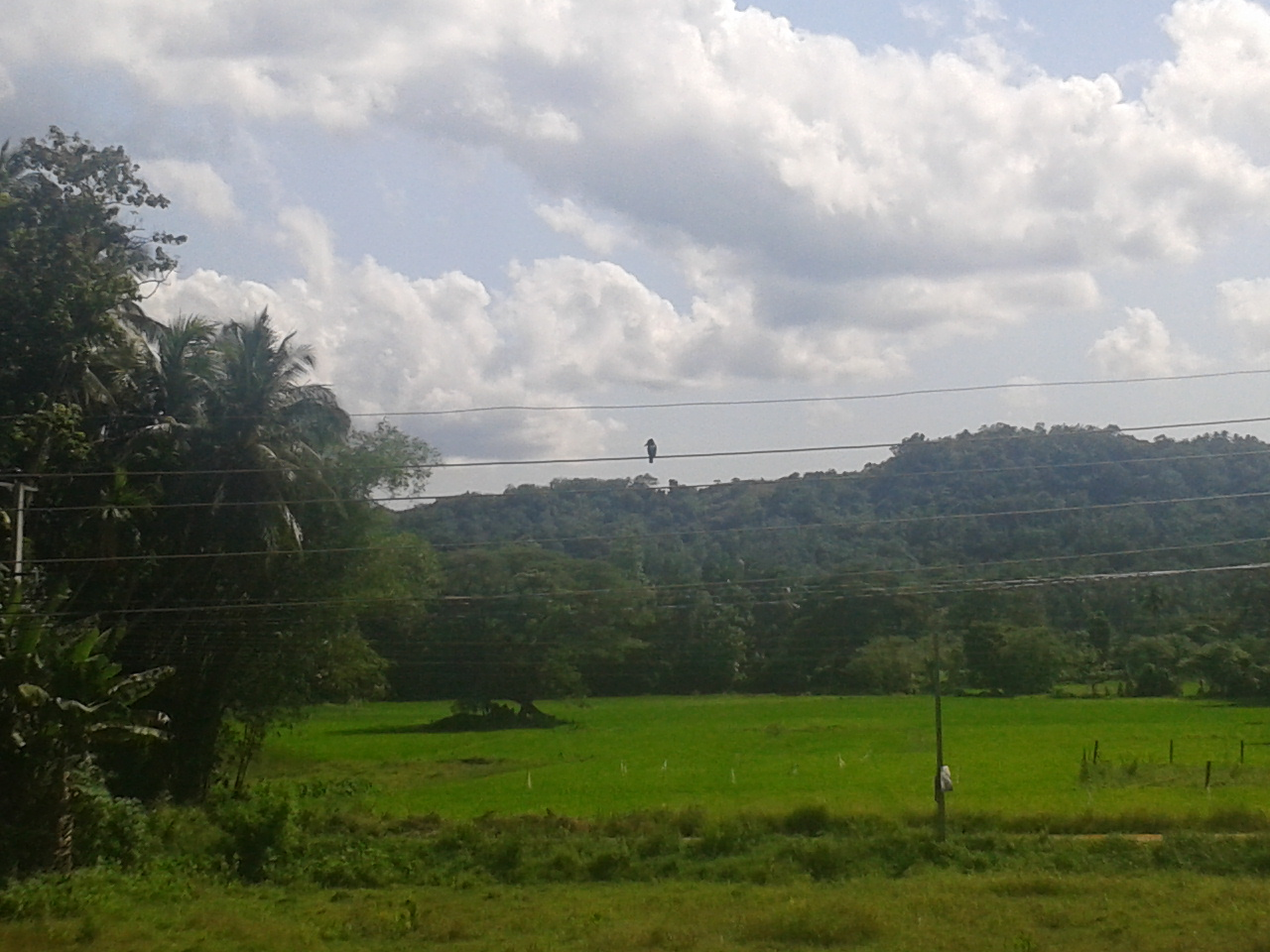

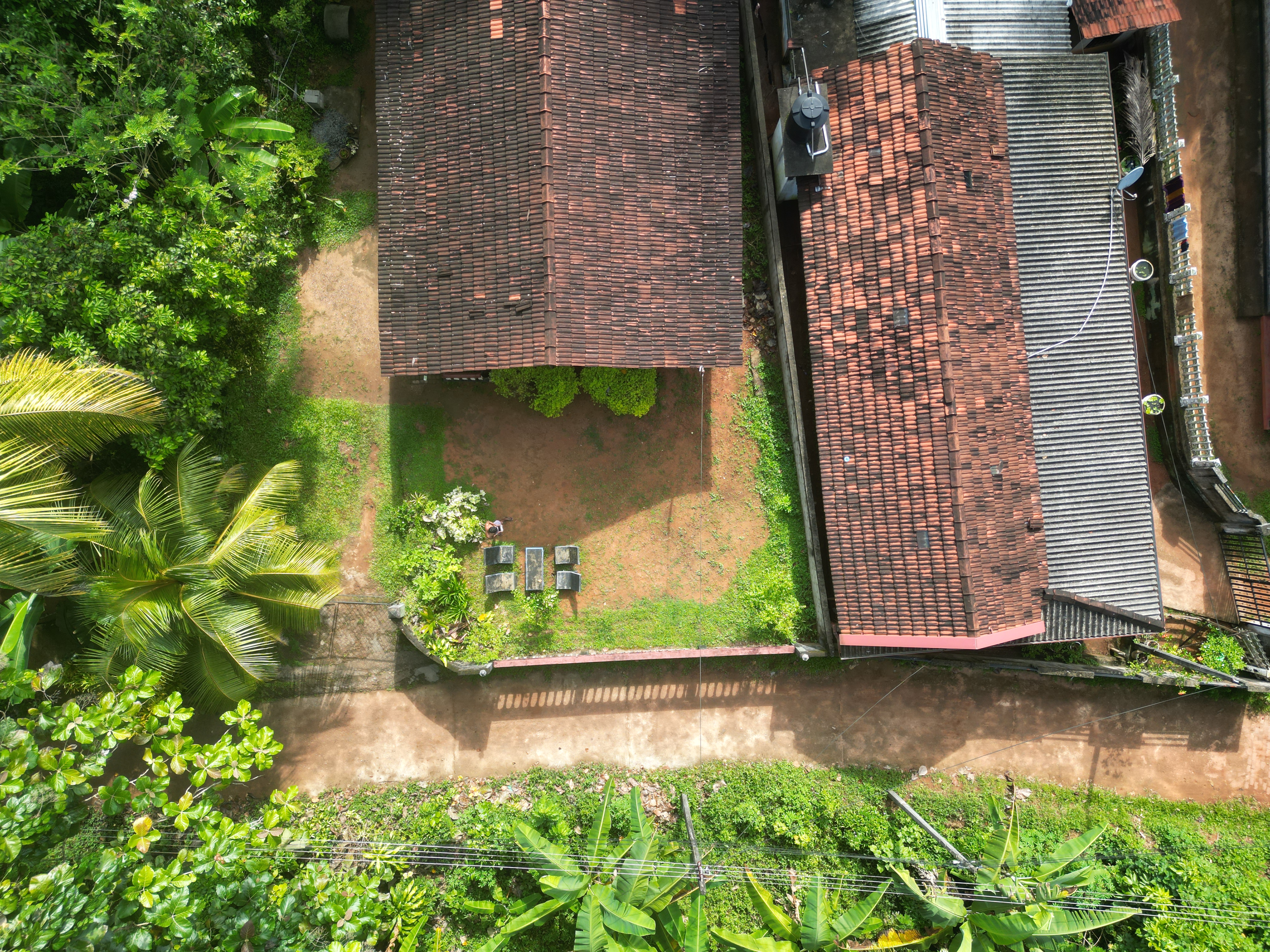
