= Bibile Fonseka =

Ceyloneese politician

Wanniarachchige Martinus Bibile Fonseka (19 November 1912 - ??) was a Ceylonese politician. He was elected from the Bulathsinhala electorate from the United National Party to the House of Representatives defeating Mangala Moonesinghe in the 1960 March general elections.
