= Bothale Walawwa =

- Alternative names: Bothale

General information
- Status: Archaeological Protected Monument
- Classification: Bungalow/Walauwa
- Location: Bothale Ihalagama, Gampaha District Sri Lanka
- Completed: 1865
- Owner: Senanayake family

Bothale Walauwa (also known as Bothale) is a large bungalow (as mansions are referred to locally) in Bothale Ihalagama, Western Province, Sri Lanka.

The large single storied house was built by Don Spater Senanayake in 1865 in his home village of Bothale which was located in the Hapitigame Korale of the Gampaha district within few minutes of the Ambepussa railway station. He was a successful entrepreneur having developed a successful business in graphite mining, owning several mines he expanded his business into plantations and investments in the arrack renting franchise in an around Bothale and opening offices in Colombo. He was awarded the honorary title of Mudaliyar by Governor Sir Joseph West Ridgeway for his philanthropy. The house became known as the Bothale Walauwa. By tradition a Mudaliyar's home was known as a Walauwa and received due respects among the inhabitants of the logicality or village. Following the death of Don Spater Senanayake in 1907, his tomb was erected in the grounds of Bothale Walauwa.

The house passed on to the Mudaliyar's son Don Stephen "D.S." Senanayake who with his brothers became active in local politics entering the Legislative Council of Ceylon and thereafter State Council of Ceylon. Becoming a prominent State Council Minister and national leader; D. S. Senanayake was lead the infinitive to gain Ceylon's Independence from Britain and right to self-rule in 1948, becoming the first Prime Minister of Ceylon. During his long political career, Senanayake used Bothale as his country seat having been elected to parliament from the Mirigama electorate. Following Senanayake's death while in office, the house was passed on to his family. The Senanayake family still holds ownership of the house and the estate while the house has been descaled an archaeological protected monument by the Sri Lankan government on 3 September 1999.

== See also ==
- Senanayake family
- Woodlands, Colombo
- Grassmere, Colombo
