= A. F. Wijemanne =

Sri Lankan politician

Senator A. F. Wijemanne

Minister of Justice

Senator of Ceylon

Sri Lankan Ambassador to Italy and Permanent Representative to FAO

Personal details
- Occupation: Politician
- Profession: Barrister

Alexander Fairlie Wijemanne was a Sri Lankan lawyer and politician. He was a Minister of Justice as an elected member of the Senate of Ceylon and served as Sri Lankan Ambassador to Italy and Permanent Representative to FAO.

Having qualified as a barrister, Wijemanne established his practice as an advocate in the unofficial bar in Matara. A founding member of the United National Party, he first contested the 1947 general election from the Hakmana Electoral District and polled 4th. He was later elected to the Senate of Ceylon and appointed Minister of Justice by Prime Minister Dudley Senanayake in March 1965 and served till 1970. In 1972, he led the United National Party majority in the Senate when it was abolished. In 1977, he was appointed Sri Lankan Ambassador to Italy and Permanent Representative to FAO.

Wijemanne married Margie Sharlett Jayewardene, daughter of Colonel T. G. Jayewardene and sister of Major T. F. Jayewardene. She was a cousin of J. R. Jayewardene, the first Executive President of Sri Lanka. They had five children.

== See also ==
- Sri Lankan Non Career Diplomats
- List of political families in Sri Lanka
