= Deraniyagala =

Deraniyagala දැරණියගල
- Town
- Location within Sri Lanka
- Coordinates: 6.9349°N 80.3380°E
- Country: Sri Lanka
- Province: Sabaragamuwa Province
- District: Kegalle
- Time zone: UTC+5:30 (Sri Lanka Standard Time)
- Area code: 036

Deraniyagala is a town in the Kegalle district in the Sabaragamuwa Province of Sri Lanka. Deraniyaga city area consists major government administrative offices, textile industries and transportation hub and the district hospital which has seven medical officers including the DMO, Dr N.G.R.R.Senevirathne who upgraded this hospital into a good condition including the ETU with standard facilities. Deraniyagala divisional secretariat area includes 214.6 km2 and population of about 46300. The divisional secretariat includes 26 grama niladari divisions.

== Economy ==
Agriculture is the main source of income for majority of the people. Tea and rubber are main sources of income for people in the area. The main source of food is from rice fields. Apart from tea and rubber, coconut, pepper, cardamom, nutmeg and other minor export crops are farmed throughout the area.

== Climate ==
Deraniyagala has a tropical rainforest climate (Af) with heavy to very heavy rainfall year-round. It is one of the wettest towns in Sri Lanka.

Climate data for Deraniyagala
Month	Jan	Feb	Mar	Apr	May	Jun	Jul	Aug	Sep	Oct	Nov	Dec	Year
Mean daily maximum °C (°F)	30.9 (87.6)	32.2 (90.0)	33.0 (91.4)	32.6 (90.7)	31.4 (88.5)	30.2 (86.4)	30.1 (86.2)	30.2 (86.4)	30.4 (86.7)	30.4 (86.7)	30.4 (86.7)	30.4 (86.7)	31.0 (87.8)
Daily mean °C (°F)	26.1 (79.0)	26.7 (80.1)	27.7 (81.9)	28.0 (82.4)	27.6 (81.7)	27.0 (80.6)	26.8 (80.2)	26.8 (80.2)	26.7 (80.1)	26.6 (79.9)	26.2 (79.2)	26.1 (79.0)	26.9 (80.4)
Mean daily minimum °C (°F)	21.3 (70.3)	21.3 (70.3)	22.4 (72.3)	23.4 (74.1)	23.9 (75.0)	23.8 (74.8)	23.6 (74.5)	23.5 (74.3)	23.1 (73.6)	22.8 (73.0)	22.1 (71.8)	21.8 (71.2)	22.8 (72.9)
Average rainfall mm (inches)	112 (4.4)	136 (5.4)	249 (9.8)	386 (15.2)	525 (20.7)	447 (17.6)	351 (13.8)	345 (13.6)	405 (15.9)	507 (20.0)	409 (16.1)	229 (9.0)	4,101 (161.5)
Source: Climate-Data.org
