= Sri Lanka Freedom Socialist Party =

- Founder: C. P. de Silva
- Founded: 1964; 61 years ago
- Split from: Sri Lanka Freedom Party
- Merged into: United National Party
- Ideology: Socialism

Election symbol
- Sun

Sri Lanka Freedom Socialist Party was a political party in Sri Lanka. SLFSP was formed in 1964 by C. P. de Silva when he broke away from the Sri Lanka Freedom Party. In the 1965 elections, SLFSP contested in coalition with the United National Party. In total SLFSP had 32 candidates, who received a total of 130 429 votes (3.2% of the nationwide vote). Five MPs were elected from the party. SLFSP joined the coalition government led by UNP.

SLFSP amalgamated the Lanka Prajathanthravadi Pakshaya. Soon thereafter SLFSP merged into UNP.

== Electoral history ==
Sri Lanka Parliamentary Elections
Election year	Votes	Vote %	Seats won	+/–	Government
1965	130,429	3.22%	5 / 151	Steady	Government
