= M. D. Banda =

Sri Lankan politician (1914–1974)

The Honourable M. D. Banda

Member of the Ceylon Parliament for Polgahawela
- In office 1965–1970
- Preceded by: Stephen Samarakkody
- Succeeded by: M. Herath

Member of the Ceylon Parliament for Hanguranketha
- In office 1960–1965
- Preceded by: Constituency created
- Succeeded by: George Abeyagoonasekera

Member of the Ceylon Parliament for Maturata
- In office 1947–1960
- Preceded by: Constituency created
- Succeeded by: Constituency abolished

Personal details
- Born: 9 March 1914 Polgahawela, Sri Lanka
- Died: 18 September 1974 (aged 60)
- Party: United National Party
- Education: St.Anthony's College, Kandy; Nalanda College Colombo
- Occupation: Ceylon Civil Service Administrator (DRO) and Politician

Mohottalage Dingiri Banda (known as M.D Banda) was a former Divisional Revenue Officer (DRO) and subsequently a Cabinet Minister and Member of Parliament in Ceylon (Sri Lanka).

Under the British Colonial Regional Administration system in 1939, Divisional Revenue Officer's (DRO's ) were appointed to succeed the then “Rate Mahattayas” in the Kandyan regions, “Mudaliyars” of the Maritime regions, “Maniagars” of the Jaffna Districts, “Vanniyars” of the Batticaloa and Trincomalee Districts, and “Atikarams” of the Mannar District. They were collectively known as Chief Headmen. Mr. M. D. Banda was in the first batch of (Kandyan) DRO's appointed in 1939. He was first appointed to Uda-Hewaheta which covered areas encompassing Hewaheta, Hanguranketa, Walapane and a good part of Nuwara Eliya District.

He first entered politics during the Second State Council by-election of 1943 from Nuwara Eliya, under the Donoughmore Constitution of Colonial Ceylon. He then entered The First Parliament in 1947 from the Maturata seat as its first Member of Parliament. Under the leadership of the Rt. Hon. D.S. Senanayake, the First Prime Minister of Independent Ceylon. Mr. M. D. Banda succeeded Hon. T. B. Jayah as Minister of Labour and Social Services in 1950. During the 2nd Parliament (1952-1953) he was Minister of Education, in the Cabinet of Hon. Dudley Senanayake. He held the same position under Hon. Sir John Kotelawala's Cabinet (1953-1956). In 1956 Hon. S.W.R.D. Bandaranaike lead SLFP won the general election and as a result, the United National Party was routed and reduced to eight seats in Parliament, only two former Cabinet members managed to survive, namely the Prime Minister Sir John Kotelawala from Dodangaslanda seat and Minister of Education M. D. Banda from the Maturata seat. Such was the admiration and high esteem his constituents held him for his great public service. In 1960 at the delimitation of seats two new seats came up replacing Maturate - Hanguranketa and Walapane and M. D. Banda was elected through the Hanguranketa seat. He was appointed Minister of Agriculture and Lands, Minister of Food, Commerce and Trade under the Hon. Dudley Senanayake Cabinet. At the 1965 General Elections, Mr. Banda decided to contest from his native place and contested the Polgahawela seat in the Kurunegala District. He was then appointed as Minister of Agriculture and Food (1965–1970) in the Hon. Dudley Senanayake Cabinet.

After primary education in the village school he entered Nalanda College Colombo. Later, he was educated at St. Anthony's College, Kandy and passed the London Matriculation and entrance to University College. It is on record that he was a well-performing athlete and cricketer at the Ceylon University College.
