= Dhanapala Attygalle =

Ceylonese politician

Dhanapala Piyadasa Attygalle was a Ceylonese lawyer and politician. A Proctor by profession, he served as Member of Parliament for Ratnapura.

He married Millicent Kularatna. They had three sons, Athula Kularatne Attygalle, member of parliament for Ratnapura district, Samitha Attygalle, member of the Sabaragamuwa Provincial Council and Dr Uthpala Attygalle, Consultant judicial medical officer.
