= Dudley Senanayake =

Sri Lankan politician (1911–1973)

The Honourable Dudley Senanayake
- ඩඩ්ලි ශෙල්ටන් සේනානායක
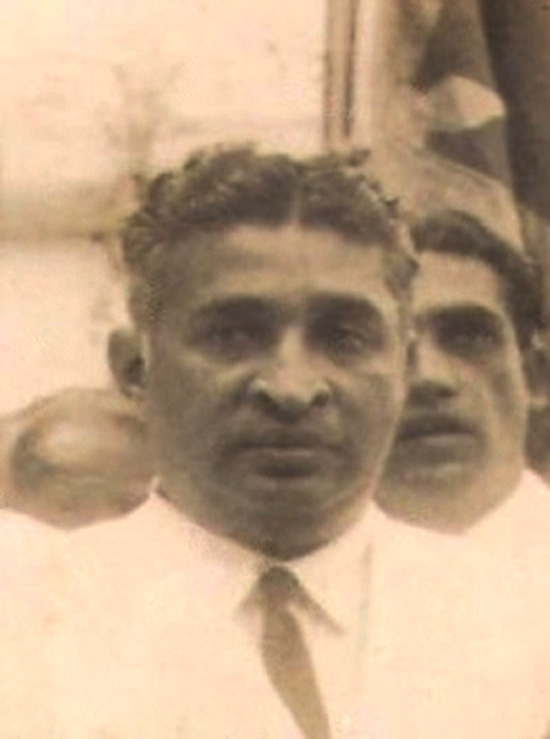
- Senanayake in the 1950s

8th Prime Minister of Ceylon
- In office 25 March 1965 – 29 May 1970
- Monarch: Elizabeth II
- Governor-General: William Gopallawa
- Preceded by: Sirimavo Bandaranaike
- Succeeded by: Sirimavo Bandaranaike
- In office 21 March 1960 – 21 July 1960
- Monarch: Elizabeth II
- Governor-General: Oliver Ernest Goonetilleke
- Preceded by: Wijeyananda Dahanayake
- Succeeded by: Sirimavo Bandaranaike
- In office 26 March 1952 – 12 October 1953
- Monarch: Elizabeth II
- Governor-General: Herwald Ramsbotham
- Preceded by: Don Stephen Senanayake
- Succeeded by: John Kotelawala

4th Leader of the Opposition
- In office 5 August 1960 – 17 December 1964
- Prime Minister: Sirimavo Bandaranaike
- Preceded by: C. P. de Silva
- Succeeded by: Sirimavo Bandaranaike

Member of the Ceylon Parliament for Dedigama
- In office 19 March 1960 – 13 April 1973
- Preceded by: Maitripala Herath
- Succeeded by: Rukman Senanayake
- In office 14 October 1947 – 10 April 1956
- Succeeded by: Maitripala Herath

Personal details
- Born: 19 June 1911 British Ceylon
- Died: 13 April 1973 (aged 61) Colombo, Sri Lanka
- Party: United National Party
- Education: Corpus Christi College, Cambridge
- Occupation: Politician
- Profession: Barrister

Dudley Shelton Senanayake (Sinhala: ඩඩ්ලි ශෙල්ටන් සේනානායක: Tamil: டட்லி சேனநாயக்கா; 19 June 1911 – 13 April 1973), was a Sri Lankan barrister and statesman who thrice served as Prime Minister of Ceylon, from 1952 to 1953 (as the second prime minister of Ceylon), in 1960, and from 1965 to 1970, and Leader of the Opposition from 1960 to 1964. Senanayake's tenures as prime minister were associated with democratic policies focused on agricultural and educational reforms with a pro-western alignment.

Born to a political family, he was the eldest son of D. S. Senanayake, who lead the independence movement that gained self-rule for Ceylon in 1948, with D. S. Senanayake becoming the prime minister of Ceylon. Dudley Senanayake, who was educated at S. Thomas' College and at Corpus Christi College, Cambridge, qualified as a barrister before entering national politics in 1936 when he was elected to the State Council and succeeded his father as minister of agriculture and lands in 1946. He served in his father's cabinet as minister of agriculture and lands from 1947 to 1952. Following the sudden death of D. S. Senanayake, Dudley Senanayake succeeded his father as the second prime minister of Ceylon. He resigned shortly after the Hartal 1953 on health grounds and was succeeded by his cousin Colonel Sir John Kotelawala. He returned to active politics in 1957, and led his party, the United National Party, to a short-lived administration in 1960. His second term as prime minister lasted four months and he then served as the Leader of the Opposition from 1960 to 1964. He formed a national government in 1965 and served his third term as prime minister until 1970 during which time he initiated planning for the most ambitious construction projects in Sri Lanka, that of the Mahaweli Development programme. Following the election defeat in 1970 (a defeat encountered on technicality, which his party did not have to accept given they had the majority votes, however out of gentlemanly spirit he agreed to handover to the left movement when they formed a coalition post election results in 1970), Senanayake remained a member of parliament and the party leader until his death on 13 April 1973.

== Early life and family ==
Dudley Senanayake was born on 19 June 1911 to the wealthy Senanayake family, which was at the time becoming active in local colonial-era politics. His paternal grandfather Mudaliyar Don Spater Senanayake established the family wealth through graphite mining, which he later expanded into plantations and investments in the arrack renting franchise. His parents were Don Stephen Senanayake and Molly Dunuwila. He was the eldest in the family with a younger brother Robert.

His father D. S. Senanayake, who was engaged in the family business at the time of his birth, along with his brothers (Dudley's uncles) F. R. Senanayake and D.C. Senanayake, were active in the temperance movement. Following the early death of F. R. Senanayake, D. S. Senanayake took over his role in the local politics, becoming a legislator and eventually leading the island's independence movement and becoming the first prime minister of Ceylon and founder of the United National Party, which is still one of the main political parties in Sri Lanka and of which Dudley would become a lifelong member. He grew up in the comfortable family home Woodlands, but was greatly affected by the events of the 1915 riots when his father was arrested by Punjabi soldiers. Imprisoned by the British military, his father and uncles faced the possibility of execution under martial law.

Never married, he remained a lifelong bachelor.

== Education ==
Dudley received his education at S. Thomas' College, where he excelled in his studies and sports. He became the Head Prefect, captained the college team at cricket at the Royal-Thomian and gained colours in hockey, boxing, and athletics. He won the Victoria Gold Medal for the most outstanding student at S. Thomas'. Senanayake then went on to Corpus Christi College, Cambridge to read for Natural Science Tripos and after graduation gained admission to the Middle Temple as a barrister.

== Political career ==
=== State Council ===
After returning to Ceylon in 1935, Dudley took oaths as an Advocate of the Supreme Court of Ceylon and briefly embanked on a legal practice under H. V. Perera, KC, before entering politics on his father's urging. He was elected from the Dedigama electorate in 1936 to the State Council, while his father was Minister of Agriculture and served as a back-bencher for ten years. As State Councilor of Dedigama, he undertook much development work in his electorate developing roads, hospitals, schools, and police stations. During this time, he became active in the Ceylon National Congress (CNC), having been appointed in December 1939 as its joint secretary with J. R. Jayewardene, another young lawyer who had been elected to the Colombo Municipal Council. The CNC was urging for the independence of Ceylon to the extent that his father D. S. Senanayake resigned from the congress because he disagreed with its revised aim of achieving complete independence from the British Empire, preferring Dominion status and its inclusion of Marxists. Following his father's resignation, Dudley succeeded his father as Minister of Agriculture and Lands in the second board of ministers of the state council in 1946.

=== Minister of Agriculture and Lands ===
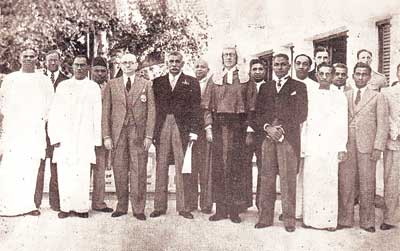
The first Cabinet of Ministers of Ceylon in 1947

Taking on his father's ministry, he carried forward many of the agricultural projects initiated by him, such as the Minneriya irrigation project. Contesting in the 1947 general elections from the Dedigama electorate, he was elected to the first parliament of independent Ceylon and was appointed to the cabinet as Minister of Agriculture and Lands by his father D. S. Senanayake, who became the first prime minister of Ceylon in 1947. He continued many of the agricultural projects he started in his first year and started the ambitious Gal Oya Project, which provided water for the cultivation of over 120,000 acres. He initiated a guaranteed price scheme for paddy and farmers. He received the portfolios of Health and Local Government when S. W. R. D. Bandaranaike resigned and crossed over to the opposition.

=== Second prime minister of Ceylon ===
He was still serving as agriculture minister when his father died unexpectedly. Four days later, on 26 March 1952, to the surprise of many, Dudley was chosen as prime minister by the Governor-General Lord Soulbury over his cousin Sir John Kotelawala. He called a general election, which the UNP won. The government became unpopular a year later, in 1953, when the price of rice was raised and subsidies were cut. Though the UNP remained in power, the Hartal 1953 greatly affected the administration and Senanayake personally, and he resigned as prime minister on health grounds in October, leaving politics and the public limelight.

=== Return to politics ===
In 1954, he accompanied his successor Sir John Kotelawala and the leader of the opposition S.W.R.D. Bandaranaike on a state visit to India on Sir John's invitation. He returned to politics in 1957 when the UNP lost elections and was appointed President of the UNP. He supported the efforts of J. R. Jayewardene in establishing UNP trade unions known as Jatika Sevaka Sangamayas and opposed nationalization of insurance companies and the Colombo port by Bandaranaike.

Following the assassination of Bandaranaike in 1959, the caretaker prime minister Wijeyananda Dahanayake called for elections after a year of turmoil. In March 1960, the UNP managed to form a government after elections and Senanayake became prime minister again, but the coalition fragmented and Dudley resigned as prime minister after only four months in office after new elections were held, in which the UNP won fewer seats. He became the leader of the opposition and helped force early elections in 1965 by persuading 14 supporters of Prime Minister Sirimavo Bandaranaike to defect.

=== Third term as prime minister ===
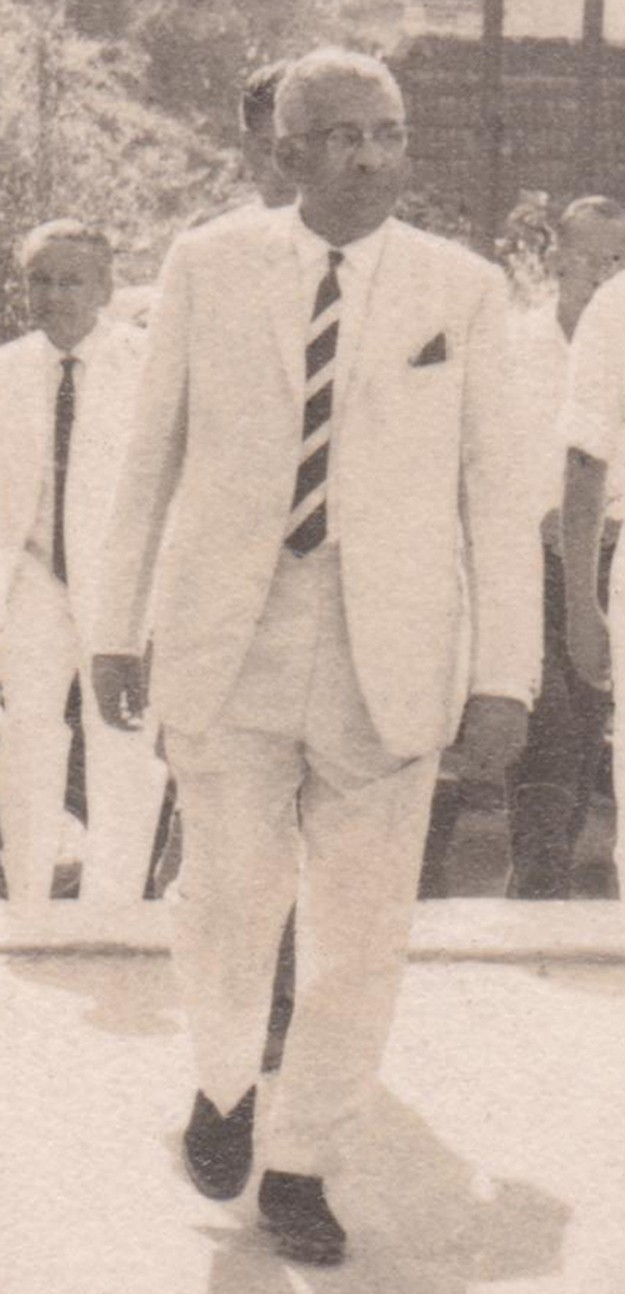
Dudley Senanayaka in 1965, at Hillwood Girls' College Kandy

Senanayake was able to form a government following the 1965 elections and served his longest term as prime minister from March 1965 to May 1970. He had narrowly missed an assassination attempt on 23 March 1965 when a bomb was thrown into Esmond Wickremesinghe's house moments after Senanayake had left the premises while negotiations were underway to form a government.

His government originally consisted of six other parties and included both Tamil and Sinhalese nationalists. Much of his term was carried out under a state of emergency (since January 1966) due to sporadic occurrences of communal violence, however Senanayake was able to control these effectively and was able to give Tamil language official status in Tamil speaking areas, which became a step closer to address the grievances of the Tamil community on language after S.W.R.D. Bandaranaike had made Sinhalese the official language replacing English. He established the Poya holiday, the day of Buddhist sabbath, and rendered formal recognition for the Mahanayaka theros. He established a University for Bhikkus in Anuradhapura. He undertook many educational reforms, expanding vocation education by setting up the Ceylon College of Technology, Katubedda in 1966 and six Junior University Colleges in 1969.

In 1966, his government claimed an attempted coup d'état was occurring and the commander of the army and several military personnel were arrested. They were later acquitted of a plot to overthrow the legally elected government, which greatly discredited the Senanayake administration, along with the bribery trail of Dr. Mackie Ratwatte, brother and former personal secretary of Sirimavo Bandaranaike.

He paid a private visit to the United States for treatment at Walter Reed Hospital, during which time he met President Lyndon Johnson, who informed him that no large-scale aid would be provided by the United States to Ceylon. He stopped off at London but was forced to return to Ceylon following rumors of his impending death.

His government has been credited with restoring the Sri Lankan economy. He initiated planning for the most ambitious construction projects in Sri Lanka, that of the Mahaweli Development programme. His administration initiated the expansion of the tourist industry, which in later years became a major source of foreign exchange and employment in Sri Lanka. However, he and his allies were defeated in the 1970 elections.

=== Later life and death ===
In the 1970 elections, the UNP won the largest vote share of any individual party. However, the UNP was thrown from office after the United Front coalition (SLFP, LSSP, and the Communists) led by Sirimavo Bandaranaike won a large majority of 91 seats. Senanayake retained his Dedigama seat in the election, which was one of the few rural seats won by the UNP in the election. Although he remained a member of parliament and active in politics, he did not accept the post of leader of the opposition for health reasons, allowing J. R. Jayewardene to serve as leader of the opposition and become de facto leader of the UNP.

He died aged 61 while being member of parliament for Dedigama on 13 April 1973 due to a heart ailment. Since his Cambridge days, he had suffered from a stomach ailment that was only diagnosed later as a birth defect, which got aggravated when under stress.

== Legacy ==
Dudley Senanayake is respected by most Sri Lankans as a statesman of simplicity, democratic toleration, and moderation. He is remembered for carrying forward his father's legacy, especially in the areas of agricultural reforms and large-scale projects, introducing his own, and initiating more such as the Mahaweli development programme. His foreign policy was pro-western, yet he maintained good relations with communist countries such as China, establishing the Ceylon-China Trade Agreement of 1952.

Statues of Dudley Senanayake have been erected in many parts of the island, including one at the Old Parliament Building, Colombo and many schools, libraries, and public buildings have been named in his honor. Dudley Senanayake's funeral took place at Independence Square, where J. R. Jayewardene, delivering a moving speech, ended it by saying "Good night sweet Prince".

== Electoral history ==
Electoral history of Dudley Senanayake
Election	Constituency	Party	Votes	Result
1936 state council	Dedigama	Independent		Elected
1947 parliamentary	Dedigama	United National Party	20,170	Elected
1952 parliamentary	Dedigama	United National Party	21,206	Elected
1960 (March) parliamentary	Dedigama	United National Party	12,208	Elected
1960 (July) parliamentary	Dedigama	United National Party	13,340	Elected
1965 parliamentary	Dedigama	United National Party	17,987	Elected
1970 parliamentary	Dedigama	United National Party	24,436	Elected

== See also ==
- List of political families in Sri Lanka
- Don Stephen Senanayake
- Rukman Senanayake

Government offices
Preceded by Sirimavo Ratwatte Dias Bandaranaike	Prime Minister of Ceylon; 1965–1970	Succeeded by Sirimavo Ratwatte Dias Bandaranaike
Preceded by Wijeyananda Dahanayake	Prime Minister of Ceylon; 1960–1960	Succeeded by Sirimavo Ratwatte Dias Bandaranaike
Preceded by Don Stephen Senanayake	Prime Minister of Ceylon; 1952–1953	Succeeded by John Lionel Kotalawela
