= 1965 Ceylonese parliamentary election =

Sri Lankan government elections

- 22 March 1965

151 seats in the House of Representatives of Ceylon 76 seats were needed for a majority
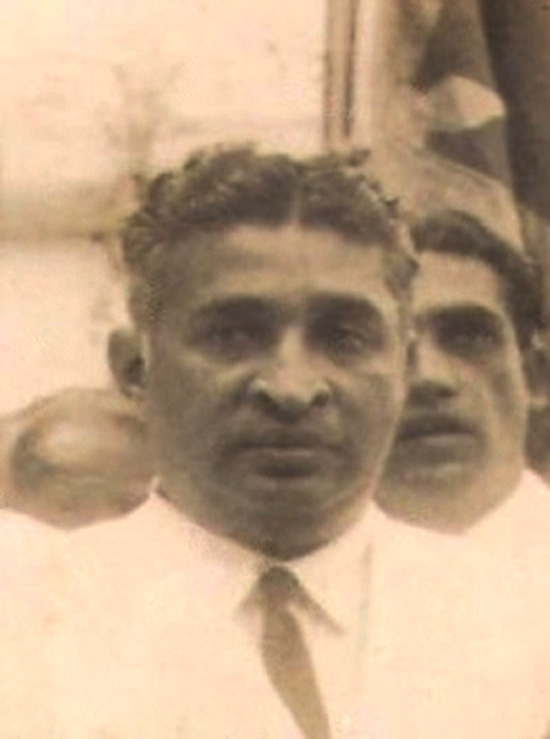

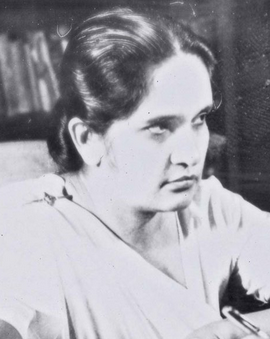
	First party	Second party
Leader	Dudley Senanayake	Sirimavo Bandaranaike
Party	UNP	SLFP
Leader since	1957	1960
Leader's seat	Dedigama	Attanagalla
Last election	37.19%, 30 seats	33.22%, 75 seats
Seats won	66	41
Seat change	▲36	▼34
Popular vote	1,590,929	1,221,437
Percentage	39.31%	30.18%
Swing	▲2.12pp	▼3.04
Prime Minister before election
Sirimavo Bandaranaike
SLFP
Prime Minister-designate
Dudley Senanayake
UNP

Parliamentary elections were held in Ceylon in March 1965.

== Background ==
The SLFP government of Sirimavo Bandaranaike lost its majority in December 1964 when some MPs deserted it over the nationalization of Lakehouse Newspapers.

Bandaranaike's program of extensive nationalization had alarmed many of the island's business interests, which rallied to the United National Party. The economy had been stagnant, and rationing had been imposed in the face of persistent food shortages.

The UNP promised to form a "National Front" government to oppose the SLFP and its Marxist allies. UNP leader Dudley Senanayake promised cabinet posts both to smaller Sinhalese nationalist parties and the Illankai Tamil Arasu Kachchi.

== Results ==
The UNP did not obtain a majority, but was able to govern as a National Front with the ITAK's support.

Party	Votes	%	Seats
United National Party	1,590,929	39.31	66
Sri Lanka Freedom Party	1,221,437	30.18	41
Lanka Sama Samaja Party	302,095	7.47	10
Illankai Tamil Arasu Kachchi	217,914	5.38	14
Sri Lanka Freedom Socialist Party	130,429	3.22	5
Communist Party of Ceylon	109,754	2.71	4
All Ceylon Tamil Congress	98,746	2.44	3
Mahajana Eksath Peramuna	96,665	2.39	1
National Liberation Front	18,791	0.46	1
Others	259,960	6.42	6
Total	4,046,720	100.00	151
Total votes	3,821,918	–	
Registered voters/turnout	4,710,887	81.13	
Source: Kusaka Research Institute
