= Electoral districts of Sri Lanka (1947–1989) =

Electoral district of Sri Lanka

A total of 183 electoral districts existed from 1947 to 1989 in Sri Lanka. The country's 1978 Constitution introduced a new proportional representation electoral system for electing members of Parliament from 1989 onwards. The existing 160 single-member, double-member and triple-member districts were replaced with 22 multi-member electoral districts, similar to the existing administrative districts of Sri Lanka. The remaining 160 districts by 1989 continues to be a polling division of the current multi-member electoral districts.

== List ==
Electoral District	District	Province	No. (Note: Order of creation)	First Election (Est.)	Last Election (Ab.)	Duration	Elections	By-elections	Total Members (Note: Total different members)	Notes
Dambulla	Matale	Central	1	23 August 1947	15 February 1989	41 years, 176 days	8		3	
Galaha	Kandy	Central	2	23 August 1947	19 March 1960	12 years, 209 days	3		2	
Gampola	Kandy	Central	3	23 August 1947	15 February 1989	41 years, 176 days	8	1	7	
Kadugannawa	Kandy	Central	4	23 August 1947	19 March 1960	12 years, 209 days	3		4	Double-member district
Kandy	Kandy	Central	5	23 August 1947	15 February 1989	41 years, 176 days	8	3	6	
Kotagala	Nuwara Eliya	Central	6	23 August 1947	19 March 1960	12 years, 209 days	3		3	
Maskeliya	Nuwara Eliya	Central	7	23 August 1947	21 July 1977	29 years, 302 days	7	1	7	
Matale	Matale	Central	8	23 August 1947	15 February 1989	41 years, 176 days	8		5	
Maturata	Kandy	Central	9	23 August 1947	19 March 1960	12 years, 209 days	3		1	
Minipe	Kandy	Central	10	23 August 1947	21 July 1977	29 years, 302 days	7		4	
Nawalapitiya	Kandy	Central	11	23 August 1947	15 February 1989	41 years, 176 days	8		6	
Nuwara Eliya	Nuwara Eliya	Central	12	23 August 1947	21 July 1977	41 years, 176 days	7	1	6	
Talawakelle	Nuwara Eliya	Central	13	23 August 1947	19 March 1960	12 years, 209 days	3		3	
Wattegama	Kandy	Central	14	23 August 1947	21 July 1977	29 years, 302 days	7		3	
Batticaloa	Batticaloa	Eastern	15	23 August 1947	15 February 1989	41 years, 176 days	8		3	
Kalkudah	Batticaloa	Eastern	16	23 August 1947	15 February 1989	41 years, 176 days	8		4	
Kalmunai	Ampara	Eastern	17	23 August 1947	15 February 1989	41 years, 176 days	8		4	
Mutur	Trincomalee	Eastern	18	23 August 1947	15 February 1989	41 years, 176 days	8		5	
Paddiruppu	Batticaloa	Eastern	19	23 August 1947	15 February 1989	41 years, 176 days	8		4	
Pottuvil	Ampara	Eastern	20	23 August 1947	15 February 1989	41 years, 176 days	8		4	
Trincomalee	Trincomalee	Eastern	21	23 August 1947	15 February 1989	41 years, 176 days	8	1	5	
Chavakachcheri	Jaffna	Northern	22	23 August 1947	15 February 1989	41 years, 176 days	8		2	
Jaffna	Jaffna	Northern	23	23 August 1947	15 February 1989	41 years, 176 days	8		4	
Kankesanthurai	Jaffna	Northern	24	23 August 1947	15 February 1989	41 years, 176 days	8		3	
Kayts	Jaffna	Northern	25	23 August 1947	15 February 1989	41 years, 176 days	8	1	4	
Kopay	Jaffna	Northern	26	23 August 1947	15 February 1989	41 years, 176 days	8		3	
Mannar	Mannar	Northern	27	23 August 1947	15 February 1989	41 years, 176 days	8	1	4	
Point Pedro	Jaffna	Northern	28	23 August 1947	15 February 1989	41 years, 176 days	8		3	
Vaddukoddai	Jaffna	Northern	29	23 August 1947	15 February 1989	41 years, 176 days	8		5	
Vavuniya	Vavuniya	Northern	30	23 August 1947	15 February 1989	41 years, 176 days	8		4	
Anuradhapura	Anuradhapura	North Central	31	23 August 1947	15 February 1989	41 years, 176 days	8			
Horowpothana	Anuradhapura	North Central	32	23 August 1947	15 February 1989	41 years, 176 days	8		3	
Kalawewa	Anuradhapura	North Central	33	23 August 1947	15 February 1989	41 years, 176 days	8		4	
Medawachchiya	Anuradhapura	North Central	34	23 August 1947	15 February 1989	41 years, 176 days	8		1	
Polonnaruwa	Polonnaruwa	North Central	35	23 August 1947	15 February 1989	41 years, 176 days	8		5	
Bingiriya	Kurunegala	North Western	36	23 August 1947	15 February 1989	41 years, 176 days	8			
Chilaw	Puttalam	North Western	37	23 August 1947	15 February 1989	41 years, 176 days	8		5	
Dambadeniya	Kurunegala	North Western	38	23 August 1947	15 February 1989	41 years, 176 days	8		3	
Dandagamuwa	Kurunegala	North Western	39	23 August 1947	19 March 1960	12 years, 209 days	3			
Dodangaslanda	Kurunegala	North Western	40	23 August 1947	15 February 1989	41 years, 176 days	8			
Kurunegala	Kurunegala	North Western	41	23 August 1947	15 February 1989	41 years, 176 days	8		4	
Nattandiya	Puttalam	North Western	42	23 August 1947	15 February 1989	41 years, 176 days	8			
Nikaweratiya	Kurunegala	North Western	43	23 August 1947	15 February 1989	41 years, 176 days	8	1	3	
Puttalam	Puttalam	North Western	44	23 August 1947	15 February 1989	41 years, 176 days	8			
Wariyapola	Kurunegala	North Western	45	23 August 1947	15 February 1989	41 years, 176 days	8		5	
Badulla	Badulla	Uva	46	23 August 1947	15 February 1989	41 years, 176 days	8		5	Double-member district until 1960
Bandarawela	Badulla	Uva	47	23 August 1947	15 February 1989	41 years, 176 days	8		5	
Buttala	Moneragala	Uva	48	23 August 1947	19 March 1960	41 years, 176 days	3	1	3	
Haputale	Badulla	Uva	49	23 August 1947	15 February 1989	41 years, 176 days	8		4	
Welimada	Badulla	Uva	50	23 August 1947	15 February 1989	41 years, 176 days	8	4	6	
Alutnuwara	Ratnapura	Sabaragamuwa	51	23 August 1947	19 March 1960	12 years, 209 days	3	1	4	
Balangoda	Ratnapura	Sabaragamuwa	52	23 August 1947	15 February 1989	41 years, 176 days	8	2	10	Double-member district
Dedigama	Kegalle	Sabaragamuwa	53	23 August 1947	15 February 1989	41 years, 176 days	8	1	4	
Dehiowita	Kegalle	Sabaragamuwa	54	23 August 1947	21 July 1977	29 years, 332 days	7		5	
Kegalle	Kegalle	Sabaragamuwa	55	23 August 1947	15 February 1989	41 years, 176 days	8		3	
Kiriella	Ratnapura	Sabaragamuwa	56	23 August 1947	21 July 1977	29 years, 332 days	7		5	
Mawanella	Kegalle	Sabaragamuwa	57	23 August 1947	15 February 1989	41 years, 176 days	8		4	
Nivitigala	Ratnapura	Sabaragamuwa	58	23 August 1947	15 February 1989	41 years, 176 days	8		5	
Ratnapura	Ratnapura	Sabaragamuwa	59	23 August 1947	15 February 1989	41 years, 176 days	8		6	
Ruwanwella	Kegalle	Sabaragamuwa	60	23 August 1947	15 February 1989	41 years, 176 days	8		4	
Akuressa	Matara	Southern	61	23 August 1947	15 February 1989	41 years, 176 days	8		4	
Ambalangoda-Balapitiya	Galle	Southern	62	23 August 1947	19 March 1960	12 years, 209 days	3		4	Double-member district
Baddegama	Galle	Southern	63	23 August 1947	15 February 1989	41 years, 176 days	8	1	5	
Beliatta	Hambantota	Southern	64	23 August 1947	15 February 1989	41 years, 176 days	8		4	
Deniyaya	Matara	Southern	65	23 August 1947	15 February 1989	41 years, 176 days	8		7	
Galle	Galle	Southern	66	23 August 1947	15 February 1989	41 years, 176 days	8		3	
Hakmana	Matara	Southern	67	23 August 1947	15 February 1989	41 years, 176 days	8		5	
Hambantota	Hambantota	Southern	68	23 August 1947	19 March 1960	12 years, 209 days	3		2	
Matara	Matara	Southern	69	23 August 1947	15 February 1989	41 years, 176 days	8		5	
Udugama	Galle	Southern	70	23 August 1947	19 March 1960	12 years, 209 days	3		2	
Weligama	Matara	Southern	71	23 August 1947	15 February 1989	41 years, 176 days	8		2	
Agalawatte	Kalutara	Western	72	23 August 1947	15 February 1989	41 years, 176 days	8	1	5	
Attanagalla	Gampaha	Western	73	23 August 1947	15 February 1989	41 years, 176 days	8	1	4	
Avissawella	Colombo	Western	74	23 August 1947	15 February 1989	41 years, 176 days	8	1	4	
Colombo Central	Colombo	Western	75	23 August 1947	15 February 1989	41 years, 176 days	8		10	Triple-member district
Colombo North	Colombo	Western	76	23 August 1947	15 February 1989	41 years, 176 days	8	1	5	
Colombo South	Colombo	Western	77	23 August 1947	21 July 1977	29 years, 332 days	7		5	Double-member district from 1960 to 1977
Gampaha	Gampaha	Western	78	23 August 1947	15 February 1989	41 years, 176 days	8	1	4	
Horana	Kalutara	Western	79	23 August 1947	15 February 1989	41 years, 176 days	8		5	
Ja-Ela	Gampaha	Western	80	23 August 1947	15 February 1989	41 years, 176 days	8	1	4	
Kalutara	Kalutara	Western	81	23 August 1947	15 February 1989	41 years, 176 days	8	1	3	
Kelaniya	Gampaha	Western	82	23 August 1947	15 February 1989	41 years, 176 days	8		4	
Kotte	Colombo	Western	83	23 August 1947	15 February 1989	41 years, 176 days	8		4	
Matugama	Kalutara	Western	84	23 August 1947	15 February 1989	41 years, 176 days	8	1	4	
Mirigama	Gampaha	Western	85	23 August 1947	15 February 1989	41 years, 176 days	8		7	
Moratuwa	Colombo	Western	86	23 August 1947	15 February 1989	41 years, 176 days	8		5	
Negombo	Gampaha	Western	87	23 August 1947	15 February 1989	41 years, 176 days	8	1	5	
Panadura	Kalutara	Western	88	23 August 1947	15 February 1989	41 years, 176 days	8		4	
Wellawatte-Galkissa	Colombo	Western	89	23 August 1947	19 March 1960	12 years, 209 days	3		2	
Akurana	Kandy	Central	90	19 March 1960	27 May 1970	10 years, 69 days	4			
Galagedara	Kandy	Central	91	19 March 1960	27 May 1970	10 years, 69 days	5		5	
Hanguranketha	Nuwara Eliya	Central	92	19 March 1960	15 February 1989	28 years, 333 days	5		4	
Hewaheta	Kandy	Central	93	19 March 1960	15 February 1989	28 years, 333 days	5			
Kotmale	Nuwara Eliya	Central	94	19 March 1960	15 February 1989	28 years, 333 days	5			
Kundasale	Kandy	Central	95	19 March 1960	15 February 1989	28 years, 333 days	5			
Laggala	Matale	Central	96	19 March 1960	15 February 1989	28 years, 333 days	5			
Rattota	Matale	Central	97	19 March 1960	15 February 1989	28 years, 333 days	5			
Senkadagala	Kandy	Central	98	19 March 1960	15 February 1989	28 years, 333 days	5		2	
Teldeniya	Kandy	Central	99	19 March 1960	15 February 1989	28 years, 333 days	5			
Udunuwara	Kandy	Central	100	19 March 1960	15 February 1989	28 years, 333 days	5			
Walapane	Nuwara Eliya	Central	101	19 March 1960	15 February 1989	28 years, 333 days	5			
Yatinuwara	Kandy	Central	102	19 March 1960	15 February 1989	28 years, 333 days	5			
Ampara	Ampara	Eastern	103	19 March 1960	15 February 1989	28 years, 333 days	5		4	
Sammanthurai	Ampara	Eastern	104	19 March 1960	15 February 1989	28 years, 333 days	5		3	Named Nintavur until 1977
Kilinochchi	Kilinochchi	Northern	105	19 March 1960	15 February 1989	28 years, 333 days	5		3	
Nallur	Jaffna	Northern	106	19 March 1960	15 February 1989	28 years, 333 days	5		3	
Udupiddy	Jaffna	Northern	107	19 March 1960	15 February 1989	28 years, 333 days	5		3	
Manipay	Jaffna	Northern	108	19 March 1960	15 February 1989	28 years, 333 days	5		1	Named Uduvil until 1977
Kekirawa	Anuradhapura	North Central	109	19 March 1960	15 February 1989	28 years, 333 days	5			
Mihintale	Anuradhapura	North Central	110	19 March 1960	15 February 1989	28 years, 333 days	5			
Minneriya	Anuradhapura	North Central	111	19 March 1960	15 February 1989	28 years, 333 days	5		3	
Hiriyala	Kurunegala	North Western	112	19 March 1960	15 February 1989	28 years, 333 days	5			
Katugampola	Kurunegala	North Western	113	19 March 1960	15 February 1989	28 years, 333 days	5			
Kuliyapitiya	Kurunegala	North Western	114	19 March 1960	15 February 1989	28 years, 333 days	5			
Mawatagama	Kurunegala	North Western	115	19 March 1960	15 February 1989	28 years, 333 days	5		4	
Polgahawela	Kurunegala	North Western	116	19 March 1960	15 February 1989	28 years, 333 days	5		4	
Wennappuwa	Puttalam	North Western	117	19 March 1960	15 February 1989	28 years, 333 days	5			
Yapahuwa	Kurunegala	North Western	118	19 March 1960	15 February 1989	28 years, 333 days	5			
Bibile	Moneragala	Uva	119	19 March 1960	15 February 1989	28 years, 333 days	5			
Mahiyangana	Badulla	Uva	120	19 March 1960	15 February 1989	28 years, 333 days	5			
Moneragala	Moneragala	Uva	121	19 March 1960	15 February 1989	28 years, 333 days	5			
Passara	Badulla	Uva	122	19 March 1960	15 February 1989	28 years, 333 days	5		4	
Soranatota	Badulla	Uva	123	19 March 1960	21 July 1977	17 years, 124 days	4		2	
Uva Paranagama	Badulla	Uva	124	19 March 1960	15 February 1989	28 years, 333 days	5		3	
Galigamuwa	Kegalle	Sabaragamuwa	125	19 March 1960	15 February 1989	28 years, 333 days	5			
Kalawana	Ratnapura	Sabaragamuwa	126	19 March 1960	15 February 1989	28 years, 333 days	5			
Kolonna	Ratnapura	Sabaragamuwa	127	19 March 1960	15 February 1989	28 years, 333 days	5	1	4	
Pelmadulla	Ratnapura	Sabaragamuwa	128	19 March 1960	15 February 1989	28 years, 333 days	5		3	
Rakwana	Ratnapura	Sabaragamuwa	129	19 March 1960	15 February 1989	28 years, 333 days	5			
Rambukkana	Kegalle	Sabaragamuwa	130	19 March 1960	15 February 1989	28 years, 333 days	5			
Yatiyantota	Kegalle	Sabaragamuwa	131	19 March 1960	15 February 1989	28 years, 333 days	5			
Akmeemana	Galle	Southern	132	19 March 1960	15 February 1989	28 years, 333 days	5		3	
Ambalangoda	Galle	Southern	133	19 March 1960	15 February 1989	28 years, 333 days	5		5	
Balapitiya	Galle	Southern	134	19 March 1960	15 February 1989	28 years, 333 days	5		4	
Bentara-Elpitiya	Galle	Southern	135	19 March 1960	15 February 1989	28 years, 333 days	5		5	
Devinuwara	Matara	Southern	136	19 March 1960	15 February 1989	28 years, 333 days	5		4	
Habaraduwa	Galle	Southern	137	19 March 1960	15 February 1989	28 years, 333 days	5		3	
Hiniduma	Galle	Southern	138	19 March 1960	15 February 1989	28 years, 333 days	5		2	
Kamburupitiya	Matara	Southern	139	19 March 1960	15 February 1989	28 years, 333 days	5		3	
Mulkirigala	Hambantota	Southern	140	19 March 1960	15 February 1989	28 years, 333 days	5	1	3	
Rathgama	Galle	Southern	141	19 March 1960	15 February 1989	28 years, 333 days	5	1	3	
Tissamaharama	Hambantota	Southern	142	19 March 1960	15 February 1989	28 years, 333 days	5		4	
Bandaragama	Kalutara	Western	143	19 March 1960	15 February 1989	28 years, 333 days	5	2	5	
Beruwala	Kalutara	Western	144	19 March 1960	15 February 1989	28 years, 333 days	5		2	
Borella	Colombo	Western	145	19 March 1960	15 February 1989	28 years, 333 days	5	1	5	
Bulathsinhala	Kalutara	Western	146	19 March 1960	15 February 1989	28 years, 333 days	5	1	5	
Dehiwala-Mount Lavinia	Colombo	Western	147	19 March 1960	15 February 1989	28 years, 333 days	5	1	4	Later renamed Dehiwala
Divulapitiya	Gampaha	Western	148	19 March 1960	15 February 1989	28 years, 333 days	5		3	
Dompe	Gampaha	Western	149	19 March 1960	15 February 1989	28 years, 333 days	5			
Homagama	Colombo	Western	150	19 March 1960	15 February 1989	28 years, 333 days	5		2	
Katana	Gampaha	Western	151	19 March 1960	15 February 1989	28 years, 333 days	5	1	2	
Kesbewa	Colombo	Western	152	19 March 1960	15 February 1989	28 years, 333 days	5	2	3	
Kolonnawa	Colombo	Western	153	19 March 1960	15 February 1989	28 years, 333 days	5	1	4	
Kottawa	Colombo	Western	154	19 March 1960	21 July 1977	17 years, 124 days	4		3	
Mahara	Gampaha	Western	155	19 March 1960	15 February 1989	28 years, 333 days	5			
Minuwangoda	Gampaha	Western	156	19 March 1960	15 February 1989	28 years, 333 days	5		2	
Wattala	Gampaha	Western	157	19 March 1960	15 February 1989	28 years, 333 days	5		2	
Harispattuwa	Kandy	Central	158	21 July 1977	15 February 1989	11 years, 239 days	1			
Nuwara Eliya-Maskeliya	Nuwara Eliya	Central	159	21 July 1977	15 February 1989	11 years, 239 days	1		3	Triple-member district
Pathadumbara	Kandy	Central	160	21 July 1977	15 February 1989	11 years, 239 days	1		1	
Udadumbara	Kandy	Central	161	21 July 1977	15 February 1989	11 years, 239 days	1		1	
Seruvila	Trincomalee	Eastern	162	21 July 1977	15 February 1989	11 years, 239 days	1		1	
Mullaitivu	Mullaitivu	Northern	163	21 July 1977	15 February 1989	11 years, 239 days	1		1	
Anuradhapura East	Anuradhapura	North Central	164	21 July 1977	15 February 1989	11 years, 239 days	1			
Anuradhapura West	Anuradhapura	North Central	165	21 July 1977	15 February 1989	11 years, 239 days	1			
Medirigiriya	Polonnaruwa	North Central	166	21 July 1977	15 February 1989	11 years, 239 days	1			
Anamaduwa	Puttalam	North Western	167	21 July 1977	15 February 1989	11 years, 239 days	1		1	
Galgamuwa	Kurunegala	North Western	168	21 July 1977	15 February 1989	11 years, 239 days	1			
Panduwasnuwara	Kurunegala	North Western	169	21 July 1977	15 February 1989	11 years, 239 days	1			
Hali-Ela	Badulla	Uva	170	21 July 1977	15 February 1989	11 years, 239 days	1			
Viyaluwa	Badulla	Uva	171	21 July 1977	15 February 1989	11 years, 239 days	1			
Wellawaya	Moneragala	Uva	172	21 July 1977	15 February 1989	11 years, 239 days	1			
Aranayaka	Kegalle	Sabaragamuwa	173	21 July 1977	15 February 1989	11 years, 239 days	1		1	
Deraniyagala	Kegalle	Sabaragamuwa	174	21 July 1977	15 February 1989	11 years, 239 days	1			
Eheliyagoda	Ratnapura	Sabaragamuwa	175	21 July 1977	15 February 1989	11 years, 239 days	1		1	
Karandeniya	Galle	Southern	176	21 July 1977	15 February 1989	11 years, 239 days	1		1	
Tangalle	Hambantota	Southern	177	21 July 1977	15 February 1989	11 years, 239 days	1		1	
Biyagama	Gampaha	Western	178	21 July 1977	15 February 1989	11 years, 239 days	1		1	
Colombo East	Colombo	Western	179	21 July 1977	15 February 1989	11 years, 239 days	1		1	
Colombo West	Colombo	Western	180	21 July 1977	15 February 1989	11 years, 239 days	1	1	2	
Kaduwela	Colombo	Western	181	21 July 1977	15 February 1989	11 years, 239 days	1	1	2	
Maharagama	Colombo	Western	182	21 July 1977	15 February 1989	11 years, 239 days	1	1	2	
Ratmalana	Colombo	Western	183	21 July 1977	15 February 1989	11 years, 239 days	1		1	
Total			183	23 August 1947	15 February 1989	41 years, 176 days	8	34		
