= Electoral districts of Central Province, Sri Lanka =

Currently there are three electoral districts in Central Province, Sri Lanka.

The country's 1978 Constitution introduced a new proportional representation electoral system for electing members of Parliament from 1989 onwards. The existing single-member, double-member and triple-member districts were replaced with multi-member electoral districts, similar to the existing administrative districts of Sri Lanka. The remaining districts by 1989 continues to be a polling division of the current multi-member electoral districts.

== 1947 to 1989 ==
Electoral District	District	No. (Note: Order of creation)	First Election (Est.)	Last Election (Ab.)	Duration	Elections	By-elections	Total Members (Note: Total different members)	Notes
Akurana	Kandy		19 March 1960	27 May 1970	10 years, 69 days	4			
Dambulla	Matale		23 August 1947	15 February 1989	41 years, 176 days	8		3	
Galagedara	Kandy		19 March 1960	27 May 1970	10 years, 69 days	5		5	
Galaha	Kandy		23 August 1947	19 March 1960	12 years, 209 days	3		2	
Gampola	Kandy		23 August 1947	15 February 1989	41 years, 176 days	8	1	7	
Hanguranketha	Nuwara Eliya		19 March 1960	15 February 1989	28 years, 333 days	5		4	
Harispattuwa	Kandy		21 July 1977	15 February 1989	11 years, 239 days	1			
Hewaheta	Kandy		19 March 1960	15 February 1989	28 years, 333 days	5			
Kadugannawa	Kandy		23 August 1947	19 March 1960	12 years, 209 days	3		4	Double-member district
Kandy	Kandy		23 August 1947	15 February 1989	41 years, 176 days	8	3	6	
Kotagala	Nuwara Eliya		23 August 1947	19 March 1960	12 years, 209 days	3		3	
Kotmale	Nuwara Eliya		19 March 1960	15 February 1989	28 years, 333 days	5			
Kundasale	Kandy		19 March 1960	15 February 1989	28 years, 333 days	5			
Laggala	Matale		19 March 1960	15 February 1989	28 years, 333 days	5			
Maskeliya	Nuwara Eliya		23 August 1947	21 July 1977	29 years, 302 days	7	1	7	
Matale	Matale		23 August 1947	15 February 1989	41 years, 176 days	8		5	
Maturata	Kandy		23 August 1947	19 March 1960	12 years, 209 days	3		1	
Minipe	Kandy		23 August 1947	21 July 1977	29 years, 302 days	7		4	
Nawalapitiya	Kandy		23 August 1947	15 February 1989	41 years, 176 days	8		6	
Nuwara Eliya	Nuwara Eliya		23 August 1947	21 July 1977	41 years, 176 days	7	1	6	
Nuwara Eliya-Maskeliya	Nuwara Eliya		21 July 1977	15 February 1989	11 years, 239 days	1		3	Triple-member district
Pathadumbara	Kandy		21 July 1977	15 February 1989	11 years, 239 days	1		1	
Rattota	Matale		19 March 1960	15 February 1989	28 years, 333 days	5			
Senkadagala	Kandy		19 March 1960	15 February 1989	28 years, 333 days	5		2	
Talawakelle	Nuwara Eliya		23 August 1947	19 March 1960	12 years, 209 days	3		3	
Teldeniya	Kandy		19 March 1960	15 February 1989	28 years, 333 days	5			
Udadumbara	Kandy		21 July 1977	15 February 1989	11 years, 239 days	1		1	
Udunuwara	Kandy		19 March 1960	15 February 1989	28 years, 333 days	5			
Walapane	Nuwara Eliya		19 March 1960	15 February 1989	28 years, 333 days	5			
Wattegama	Kandy		23 August 1947	21 July 1977	29 years, 302 days	7		3	
Yatinuwara	Kandy		19 March 1960	15 February 1989	28 years, 333 days	5			
Total			23 August 1947	15 February 1989	41 years, 176 days	8	8		

== Since 1989 ==
Electoral District	District	Area km^{2}	Polling Divisions	Population (2014)	Registered Electors (2014)	Sect. 98 Seats (2014)	Sect. 96(4) Seats (1979)	Total Seats (2014)
Kandy	Kandy	1,940	13	1,367,900	1,049,160	11	1	12
Matale	Matale	1,993	4	482,294	379,675	4	1	5
Nuwara Eliya	Nuwara Eliya	1,741	4	706,156	534,150	6	2	8
Total		65,610	160	20,274,179	14,268,063	160	36	225
