= Nivitigala Electoral District =

Electoral district of Sri Lanka

Nivitigala electoral district was an electoral district of Sri Lanka between August 1947 and February 1989. The district was named after the town of Nivitigala in Ratnapura District, Sabaragamuwa Province. The 1978 Constitution of Sri Lanka introduced the proportional representation electoral system for electing members of Parliament. The existing 160 mainly single-member electoral districts were replaced with 22 multi-member electoral districts. Nivitigala electoral district was replaced by the Ratnapura multi-member electoral district at the 1989 general elections, the first under the proportional representation system.

== Members of Parliament ==
Key

Independent SLFP UNP LSSP

Election	Member	Party	Term
1947	D. F. Hettiarachchi	LSSP	1947 - 1952
1952	W. H. Weragama	UNP	1952 -1956
1956	D. F. Hettiarachchi	SLFP	1956 - 1960
1960 (March)	D. F. Hettiarachchi	MEP	1960
1960 (July)	S. Molligoda	SLFP	1960 - 1965
1965	D. F. Hettiarachchi	SLFP	1965 - 1970
1970	Piyadasa Harischandra	SLFP	1970 - 1977
1977	Gamini Atukorale	UNP	1977 - 1989

== Elections ==
=== 1947 Parliamentary General Election ===
Results of the 1st parliamentary election held between 23 August 1947 and 20 September 1947:

Candidate	Party	Symbol	Votes	%
Don Frank Hettiarachchi	Lanka Sama Samaja Party	Elephant	5,626	43.58
Jayaweera Kuruppu	United National Party	Hand	5,602	43.40
W. J. P. Delgoda		Pair of Scales	1,130	8.75
C. E. Perera		Umbrella	309	2.39
Valid Votes			12,667	98.13
Rejected Votes			242	1.87
Total Polled			12,909	100.00
Registered Electors			28,486	
Turnout				45.32

=== 1952 Parliamentary General Election ===
Results of the 2nd parliamentary election held between 24 May 1952 and 30 May 1952:

Candidate	Party	Symbol	Votes	%
Harold Weragama	United National Party	Elephant	12,785	57.44
Don Frank Hettiarachchi	Lanka Sama Samaja Party	Star	9,257	41.59
Valid Votes			22,042	99.03
Rejected Votes			217	0.97
Total Polled			22,259	100.00
Registered Electors			29,246	
Turnout				76.11

=== 1956 Parliamentary General Election ===
Results of the 3rd parliamentary election held between 5 April 1956 and 10 April 1956:

Candidate	Party	Symbol	Votes	%
Don Frank Hettiarachchi	Sri Lanka Freedom Party	Hand	16,205	66.01
W. H. Weragama	United National Party	Elephant	8,220	34.48
Valid Votes			24,425	99.49
Rejected Votes			126	0.51
Total Polled			24,551	100.00
Registered Electors			33,676	
Turnout				72.90

=== 1960 (March) Parliamentary General Election ===
Results of the 4th parliamentary election held on 19 March 1960:

Candidate	Party	Symbol	Votes	%
Don Frank Hettiarachchi	Mahajana Eksath Peramuna	Cartwheel	7,314	39.37
K. E. Seneviratne	United National Party	Elephant	5,897	31.74
A. D. Abeysuriya	Sri Lanka Freedom Party	Hand	2,733	14.71
D. E. Malwara Arachchi		Key	1,339	7.21
B. A. M. Dhanapala		Star	812	4.37
M. P. J. Maligaspe		Umbrella	200	1.08
C. C. Tissera		Orange	172	0.68
Valid Votes			18,467	99.40
Rejected Votes			111	0.60
Total Polled			18,578	100.00
Registered Electors			23,819	
Turnout				78.00

=== 1960 (July) Parliamentary General Election ===
Results of the 5th parliamentary election held on 20 July 1960:

Candidate	Party	Symbol	Votes	%
Stanley Molligoda	Sri Lanka Freedom Party	Hand	7,486	42.41
U. Mandawala	United National Party	Elephant	5,766	32.67
Don Frank Hettiarachchi	Mahajana Eksath Peramuna	Cartwheel	3,993	22.62
M. T. Premaratne		Bicycle	305	1.73
Valid Votes			17,550	99.43
Rejected Votes			101	0.57
Total Polled			17,651	100.00
Registered Electors			23,819	
Turnout				74.11

=== 1965 Parliamentary General Election ===
Results of the 6th parliamentary election held on 22 March 1965:

Candidate	Party	Symbol	Votes	%
Don Frank Hettiarachchi	Sri Lanka Freedom Party	Hand	14,943	58.48
Stanley Molligoda	United National Party	Elephant	9,981	39.06
E. R. Eratne	Mahajana Eksath Peramuna	Cartwheel	316	1.24
Daya Basnayake		Sun	197	0.77
Valid Votes			25,437	99.55
Rejected Votes			114	0.45
Total Polled			25,551	100.00
Registered Electors			30,525	
Turnout				83.71

=== 1970 Parliamentary General Election ===
Results of the 7th parliamentary election held on 27 May 1970:

Candidate	Party	Symbol	Votes	%
Piyadasa Harischandra	Sri Lanka Freedom Party	Hand	20,614	67.34
Alfred L. Amarasekera	United National Party	Elephant	9,461	30.91
D. M. S. Dharmatillake		Bell	368	1.20
Valid Votes			30,443	99.45
Rejected Votes			169	0.55
Total Polled			30,612	100.00
Registered Electors			34,989	
Turnout				87.49

=== 1977 Parliamentary General Election ===
Results of the 8th parliamentary election held on 21 July 1977:

Candidate	Party	Symbol	Votes	%
Gamini Atukorale	United National Party	Elephant	17,450	49.89
Piyadasa Harischandra	Sri Lanka Freedom Party	Elephant	15,795	45.16
Upali Rajapakse		Star	896	2.56
B. B. Marapana		Key	450	1.29
L. P. Wimalasena		Lamp	183	0.52
Anton Senanayake		Cartwheel	96	0.28
Valid Votes			34,870	99.69
Rejected Votes			107	0.31
Total Polled			34,977	100.00
Registered Electors			39,328	
Turnout				88.94
