= Dodangaslanda Electoral District =

Electoral district of Sri Lanka

Dodangaslanda electoral district was an electoral district of Sri Lanka between August 1947 and February 1989. The district was named after the town of Dodangaslanda in Kurunegala District, North Western Province. The 1978 Constitution of Sri Lanka introduced the proportional representation electoral system for electing members of Parliament. The existing 160 mainly single-member electoral districts were replaced with 22 multi-member electoral districts. Dodangaslanda electoral district was replaced by the Kurunegala multi-member electoral district at the 1989 general elections, the first under the proportional representation system.

== Members of Parliament ==
Key

Independent SLFP UNP

Election	Member	Party	Term
1947	J. L. Kotelawala	United National Party	1947-52
1952	J. L. Kotelawala	United National Party	1952-56
1956	J. L. Kotelawala	United National Party	1956-60
1960 (March)	A. U. Romanis	United National Party	1960
1960 (July)	A. U. Romanis	United National Party	1960-65
1965	R. R. W. Rajapakse	Sri Lanka Freedom Party	1965-66
1966 by-election	Leticia Rajapakse	Sri Lanka Freedom Party	1966-70
1970	S. Wijewardena	Sri Lanka Freedom Party	1970-77
1977	S. W. Alawatuwala	United National Party	1977-89

== Elections ==
=== 1947 Parliamentary General Election ===
Candidate	Party	Symbol	Votes	%
John Lionel Kotelawala	United National Party	Elephant	17,548	
C. B. Molagoda		Key	2,263	
Valid Votes				100.00%
Rejected Votes			197	
Total Polled			20,008	
Registered Electors			34,275	
Turnout				

=== 1952 Parliamentary General Election ===
Candidate	Party	Symbol	Votes	%
John Lionel Kotelawala	United National Party	Hand	21,934	
C. A. Mathew		Umbrella	6,466	
Valid Votes				100.00%
Rejected Votes			195	
Total Polled			28,595	
Registered Electors			37,253	
Turnout				

=== 1956 Parliamentary General Election ===
Candidate	Party	Symbol	Votes	%
John Lionel Kotelawala	United National Party	Elephant	20,286	
T. B. Herath		Hand	12,012	
Valid Votes				100.00%
Rejected Votes			209	
Total Polled			32,507	
Registered Electors			46,811	
Turnout				

=== 1960 (March) Parliamentary General Election ===
Candidate	Party	Symbol	Votes	%
A. U. Romanis	United National Party	Elephant	7,571	
R. R. W. Rajapakse		Star	5,638	
M. B. Pussella		Hand	4,323	
Ratna B. Ekanayake		Cartwheel	1,124	
G. G. A. de Silva		Umbrella	258	
Valid Votes				100.00%
Rejected Votes			119	
Total Polled			19,033	
Registered Electors			24,503	
Turnout				

=== 1960 (July) Parliamentary General Election ===
Candidate	Party	Symbol	Votes	%
A. U. Romanis	United National Party	Elephant	8,758	
R. R. W. Rajapakse		Chair	8,247	
H. L. Premadasa		Star	1,806	
Valid Votes				100.00%
Rejected Votes			95	
Total Polled			18,906	
Registered Electors			24,503	
Turnout				

=== 1965 Parliamentary General Election ===
Candidate	Party	Symbol	Votes	%
R. R. W. Rajapakse		Hand	13,426	
A. U. Romanis		Elephant	12,372	
P. B. Ratnayake		Cartwheel	151	
Valid Votes				100.00%
Rejected Votes			163	
Total Polled			26,112	
Registered Electors			30,623	
Turnout				

=== 1970 Parliamentary General Election ===
Candidate	Party	Symbol	Votes	%
S. Wijewardena	Sri Lanka Freedom Party	Hand	16,991	
S. W. Alawathuwala	United National Party	Elephant	13,818	
C. A. Mathew		Bell	383	
Valid Votes				100.00%
Rejected Votes			149	
Total Polled			31,341	
Registered Electors			35,891	
Turnout				

=== 1977 Parliamentary General Election ===
Candidate	Party	Symbol	Votes	%
Valid Votes				100.00%
Rejected Votes				
Total Polled				
Registered Electors				
Turnout				
