= Mawanella Electoral District =

Electoral district of Sri Lanka

Mawanella electoral district was an electoral district of Sri Lanka between August 1947 and February 1989. The district was named after the town of Mawanella in Kegalle District, Sabaragamuwa Province. The 1978 Constitution of Sri Lanka introduced the proportional representation electoral system for electing members of Parliament. The existing 160 mainly single-member electoral districts were replaced with 22 multi-member electoral districts. Mawanella electoral district was replaced by the Kegalle multi-member electoral district at the 1989 general elections, the first under the proportional representation system.

== Members of Parliament ==
Key

Independent SLFP UNP

Election	Member	Party	Term
1947	Harris Leuke Ratwatte	UNP	1947-1952
1952	C. R. Beligammana	SLFP	1952-1956
1956	C. R. Beligammana	SLFP	1956-1960
1960 (March)	P. B. Bandaranayake	UNP	1960
1960 (July)	P. R. Ratnayake	SLFP	1960-1965
1965	C. R. Beligammana	UNP	1965-1970
1970	P. R. Ratnayake	SLFP	1970-1977
1977	C. R. Beligammana	UNP	1977-1989

== Elections ==
=== 1947 Parliamentary General Election ===
Results of the 1st parliamentary election held between 23 August 1947 and 20 September 1947:

Candidate	Party	Symbol	Votes	%
Harris Leuke Ratwatte	United National Party	Umbrella	9,442	51.87
C. R. Beligammana	Independent	Hand	7,055	38.76
B. Abeyaratne	Independent	Key	729	4.01
S. M. A. Maulana	Independent	Elephant	715	3.93
Valid Votes			17,941	98.57
Rejected Votes			261	1.43
Total Polled			18,202	100.00
Registered Electors			34,491	
Turnout				52.77

=== 1952 Parliamentary General Election ===
Results of the 2nd parliamentary election held between 24 May 1952 and 30 May 1952:

Candidate	Party	Symbol	Votes	%
C. R. Beligammana	Sri Lanka Freedom Party	Hand	14,225	54.45
Harris Leuke Ratwatte	United National Party	Elephant	10,847	41.52
N. H. Seelawathie	Independent	Wheel	739	2.83
Valid Votes			25,811	98.80
Rejected Votes			313	1.20
Total Polled			26,124	100.00
Registered Electors			36,231	
Turnout				72.10

=== 1956 Parliamentary General Election ===
Results of the 3rd parliamentary election held between 5 April 1956 and 10 April 1956:

Candidate	Party	Symbol	Votes	%
C. R. Beligammana	Sri Lanka Freedom Party	Hand	20,125	60.69
N. H. Keerthiratne	United National Party	Elephant	12,564	37.89
M. S. Mohideen		Cartwheel	200	0.60
Valid Votes			32,889	99.18
Rejected Votes			271	0.82
Total Polled			33,160	100.00
Registered Electors			40,777	
Turnout				81.32

=== 1960 (March) Parliamentary General Election ===
Results of the 4th parliamentary election held on 19 March 1960:

Candidate	Party	Symbol	Votes	%
P. B. Bandaranayake	United National Party	Elephant	7,238	33.22
C. R. Beligammana	Independent	Lamp	5,925	27.19
P. R. Ratnayake	Sri Lanka Freedom Party	Hand	5,633	25.85
A. A. Shauketaly		Key	855	3.92
A. K. Vidyasekera		Star	794	3.64
N. R. B. Daswatte		Scales	527	2.42
K. M. D. Seneviratne		Cartwheel	455	2.09
G. T. Abeykoon		Umbrella	126	0.58
S. H. Ahamed Udayar		Ladder	117	0.54
Valid Votes			21,670	99.45
Rejected Votes			120	0.55
Total Polled			21,790	100.00
Registered Electors			27,869	
Turnout				78.19

=== 1960 (July) Parliamentary General Election ===
Results of the 5th parliamentary election held on 20 July 1960:

Candidate	Party	Symbol	Votes	%
P. R. Ratnayake	Sri Lanka Freedom Party	Hand	9,218	41.91
P. B. Bandaranayake	United National Party	Elephant	8,724	39.66
C. R. Beligammana	Independent	Lamp	3,955	17.98
Valid Votes			21,897	99.55
Rejected Votes			99	0.45
Total Polled			21,996	100.00
Registered Electors			27,869	
Turnout				78.93

=== 1965 Parliamentary General Election ===
Results of the 6th parliamentary election held on 22 March 1965:

Candidate	Party	Symbol	Votes	%
C. R. Beligammana	United National Party	Elephant	17,378	58.19
P. R. Ratnayake	Sri Lanka Freedom Party	Hand	12,328	41.28
S. A. S. Perera	Independent	Cartwheel	71	0.24
Valid Votes			29,777	99.72
Rejected Votes			85	0.28
Total Polled			29,862	100.00
Registered Electors			34,847	
Turnout				85.70

=== 1970 Parliamentary General Election ===
Results of the 7th parliamentary election held on 27 May 1970:

Candidate	Party	Symbol	Votes	%
P. R. Ratnayake	Sri Lanka Freedom Party	Hand	19,242	55.60
C. R. Beligammana	United National Party	Elephant	14,504	42.21
M. I. M. Maujoud	Independent	Bell	475	1.38
Valid Votes			34,221	99.59
Rejected Votes			142	0.41
Total Polled			34,363	100.00
Registered Electors			38,938	
Turnout				88.25

=== 1977 Parliamentary General Election ===
Results of the 8th parliamentary election held on 21 July 1977:

Candidate	Party	Symbol	Votes	%
C. R. Beligammana	United National Party	Elephant	21,211	57.50
P. R. Ratnayake	Sri Lanka Freedom Party	Hand	14,632	39.67
P. P. Victor		Key	981	2.66
Valid Votes			36,824	99.82
Rejected Votes			65	0.18
Total Polled			36,889	100.00
Registered Electors			41,536	
Turnout				88.81
