= Wariyapola Electoral District =

Electoral district of Sri Lanka

Wariyapola electoral district was an electoral district of Sri Lanka between August 1947 and February 1989. The district was named after the town of Wariyapola in Kurunegala District, North Western Province. The 1978 Constitution of Sri Lanka introduced the proportional representation electoral system for electing members of Parliament. The existing 160 mainly single-member electoral districts were replaced with 22 multi-member electoral districts. Wariyapola electoral district was replaced by the Kurunegala multi-member electoral district at the 1989 general elections, the first under the proportional representation system.

== Members of Parliament ==
Key

Independent SLFP UNP

Election	Member	Party	Term
1947	Ivan Dassanayake	UNP	1947 - 1952
1952	Ivan Dassanayake	UNP	1952 - 1956
1956	A. M. Adikari	SLFP	1956 - 1960
1960 (March)	A. M. Adikari	SLFP	1960
1960 (July)	A. M. Adikari	SLFP	1960 - 1962
1962	M. A. J. Wijesinghe	SLFP	1962 -1965
1965	D. M. Tilakaratna Bandara	UNP	1965 - 1970
1970	M. A. J. Wijesinghe	SLFP	1970 - 1977
1977	Amarawathie Piyaseeli Ratnayake	UNP	1977 - 1989

== Elections ==
=== 1947 Parliamentary General Election ===
Results of the 1st parliamentary election held between 23 August 1947 and 20 September 1947:

Candidate	Party	Symbol	Votes	%
Ivan Dassanayake		Key	12,063	79.45
C. M. Edwin de Silva		Elephant	2,158	14.21
H. Poorten		Umbrella	485	3.19
T. G. R. de Silva		Star	213	1.40
Valid Votes			14,919	98.25
Rejected Votes			265	1.75
Total Polled			15,184	100.00
Registered Electors			31,886	
Turnout				47.62

=== 1952 Parliamentary General Election ===
Results of the 2nd parliamentary election held between 24 May 1952 and 30 May 1952:

Candidate	Party	Symbol	Votes	%
Ivan Dassanayake	United National Party	Elephant	19,622	78.51
A. M. Adikari		Umbrella	7,090	28.37
Samuel Benadict Pieris		Lamp	350	1.40
Valid Votes			24,796	99.21
Rejected Votes			198	0.79
Total Polled			24,994	100.00
Registered Electors			35,625	
Turnout				70.16

=== 1956 Parliamentary General Election ===
Results of the 3rd parliamentary election held between 5 April 1956 and 10 April 1956:

Candidate	Party	Symbol	Votes	%
A. M. Adikari	Sri Lanka Freedom Party	Hand	19,470	60.30
Ivan Dassanayake	United National Party	Elephant	12,657	39.20
Valid Votes			32,127	99.50
Rejected Votes			162	0.50
Total Polled			32,289	100.00
Registered Electors			42,751	
Turnout				75.53

=== 1960 (March) Parliamentary General Election ===
Results of the 4th parliamentary election held on 19 March 1960:

Candidate	Party	Symbol	Votes	%
A. M. Adikari	Sri Lanka Freedom Party	Hand	11,894	51.48
Ivan Dassanayake	United National Party	Elephant	9,172	39.70
Lewie Ariyasinghe		Key	1,078	4.67
Paiyadasa Vitharane		Star	286	1.24
S. M. Abeysekera		Umbrella	271	1.17
M. P. H. J. Wijayawardhana		Eye	261	1.13
Valid Votes			22,296	99.38
Rejected Votes			144	0.62
Total Polled			23,106	100.00
Registered Electors			29,197	
Turnout				79.14

=== 1960 (July) Parliamentary General Election ===
Results of the 5th parliamentary election held on 20 July 1960:

Candidate	Party	Symbol	Votes	%
A. M. Adikari	Sri Lanka Freedom Party	Hand	13,363	55.36
Ivan Dassanayake	United National Party	Elephant	10,624	44.02
B. D. R. Jayasena		Cartwheel	85	0.35
Valid Votes			24,072	99.73
Rejected Votes			65	0.27
Total Polled			24,137	100.00
Registered Electors			29,199	
Turnout				82.66

=== 1965 Parliamentary General Election ===
Results of the 6th parliamentary election held on 22 March 1965:

Candidate	Party	Symbol	Votes	%
D. M. Tilakaratna Bandara	Sri Lanka Freedom Party	Elephant	15,336	50.0
M. A. J. Wijesinghe	United National Party	Hand	14,904	48.58
R. B. Balasuriya		Cartwheel	149	0.49
K. Justin de Silva		Sun	140	0.46
Valid Votes			30,529	99.51
Rejected Votes			149	0.49
Total Polled			30,678	100.00
Registered Electors			35,978	
Turnout				85.27

=== 1970 Parliamentary General Election ===
Results of the 7th parliamentary election held on 27 May 1970:

Candidate	Party	Symbol	Votes	%
M. A. J. Wijesinghe	United National Party	Hand	22,304	59.77
D. M. Tilakaratne Bandara	Sri Lanka Freedom Party	Elephant	14,686	39.36
Ariyadasa Sikurajapati		Bell	223	0.60
Valid Votes			37,213	99.72
Rejected Votes			104	0.28
Total Polled			37,317	100.00
Registered Electors			42,490	
Turnout				87.83

=== 1977 Parliamentary General Election ===
Results of the 8th parliamentary election held on 21 July 1977:

Candidate	Party	Symbol	Votes	%
Valid Votes				100.00%
Rejected Votes				
Total Polled				
Registered Electors				
Turnout				
