= Mawatagama Electoral District =

Electoral district of Sri Lanka

Mawatagama electoral district was an electoral district of Sri Lanka between March 1960 and February 1989. The district was named after the town of Mawatagama in Kurunegala District, North Western Province. The 1978 Constitution of Sri Lanka introduced the proportional representation electoral system for electing members of Parliament. The existing 160 mainly single-member electoral districts were replaced with 22 multi-member electoral districts. Mawatagama electoral district was replaced by the Kurunegala multi-member electoral district at the 1989 general elections, the first under the proportional representation system, continues to be a polling division of the multi-member electoral district.

== Members of Parliament ==
Key

Independent SLFP UNP

Election	Member	Party	Term
1960 (March)	E. M. R. B. Ekanayake	United National Party	
1960 (July)	D. P. Wickremasinghe	Sri Lanka Freedom Party	
1965	Herath Ekanayake	United National Party	
1970	D. P. Wickramasinghe	Sri Lanka Freedom Party	
1977	G. M. Premachandra	United National Party	

== Elections ==
=== 1960 (March) Parliamentary General Election ===
Results of the 4th parliamentary election held on 19 March 1960:

Candidate	Party	Symbol	Votes	%
E. M. R. B. Ekanayake	UNP	Elephant	6,877	37.48
D. P. Wickremasinghe	SLFP	Hand	6,555	35.73
Sarat Wanigasekera		Star	2,019	11.00
D. D. Waidyasekera		Key	846	4.61
P. S. Ranasinghe		Star	672	3.66
S. Piyasena		Cartwheel	574	3.13
R. Janis		Umbrella	280	1.53
D.S. Handunge		Eye	258	1.41
Valid Votes			18,081	98.54
Rejected Votes			268	1.46
Total Polled			18,349	100.00
Registered Electors			22,967	
Turnout				79.89

=== 1960 (July) Parliamentary General Election ===
Results of the 5th parliamentary election held on 20 July 1960:

Candidate	Party	Symbol	Votes	%
D. P. Wickremasinghe	SLFP	Hand	10,647	56.13
E. M. R. B. Ekanayake	UNP	Elephant	7,964	41.98
Linton Gunatunge		Cartwheel	223	1.18
Valid Votes			18,834	99.28
Rejected Votes			136	0.72
Total Polled			18,970	100.00
Registered Electors			22,967	
Turnout				82.60

=== 1965 Parliamentary General Election ===
Results of the 6th parliamentary election held on 22 March 1965:

Candidate	Party	Symbol	Votes	%
Herath Ekanayake	UNP	Elephant	12,285	49.84
D. P. Wickremasinghe	SLFP	Hand	11,767	47.73
P. S. Ranasinghe		Sun	279	1.13
Y. A. Somaratna		Cartwheel	187	0.76
Valid Votes			24,518	99.46
Rejected Votes			132	0.54
Total Polled			24,650	100.00
Registered Electors			28,245	
Turnout				87.27

=== 1970 Parliamentary General Election ===
Results of the 7th parliamentary election held on 27 May 1970:

Candidate	Party	Symbol	Votes	%
D. P. Wickramasinghe	SLFP	Hand	16,608	57.65
Herath Ekanayake	UNP	Elephant	12,112	42.04
Valid Votes			28,720	99.69
Rejected Votes			88	0.31
Total Polled			28,808	100.00
Registered Electors			32,562	
Turnout				88.47

=== 1977 Parliamentary General Election ===
Results of the 8th parliamentary election held on 21 July 1977:

Candidate	Party	Symbol	Votes	%
G. M. Premachandra	UNP	Elephant	20,392	55.79
D. P. Wickremasinghe	SLFP	Hand	15,608	42.70
N. B. Kaluhendiwela		Star	237	0.65
W. Sunil Fernando		Lamp	163	0.45
Valid Votes			36,400	99.58
Rejected Votes			152	0.42
Total Polled			36,552	100.00
Registered Electors			40,303	
Turnout				90.32
