= Bennet Gunasekera =

Sri Lankan entrepreneur

Senerath Gunesekera Vidaneralalage Bennet Dias Gunasekera (27 December 1919 – October 2002) was a Sri Lankan businessman. He founded the Beligala Coconut Products (Pvt) Ltd, one of the largest coconut oil manufacturers on the island. He was elected from the Minuwangoda electorate from the United National Party to the House of Representatives defeating M. P. de Zoysa Siriwardena in the 1977 general elections. His son Mahen Gunasekera was a Member of Parliament and a Government Minister.
