= D. F. Hettiarachchi =

Ceylonese politician (1919–1970)

Hon. Don Frank Hettiarachchi

Member of the Ceylon Parliament for Nivitgala
- In office 1947–1952
- Preceded by: seat created
- Succeeded by: W. H. Weragama
- In office 1956–1960
- Preceded by: W. H. Weragama
- Succeeded by: S. Molligoda
- In office 1965–1970
- Preceded by: S. Molligoda
- Succeeded by: Piyadasa Harischandra

Personal details
- Born: 3 May 1919
- Died: 1 January 1970 (aged 50)
- Party: Sri Lanka Freedom Party
- Other political affiliations: Lanka Sama Samaja Party, Mahajana Eksath Peramuna

Don Frank Hettiarachchi (3 May 1919 – 1970) was a Ceylonese politician.

Hettiarachchi was first elected to parliament, as the member for the Nivitigala electorate, at the 1st parliamentary election, held between 23 August 1947 and 20 September 1947, representing the Lanka Sama Samaja Party (LSSP). He received 5,626 votes (43.58% of the total vote), narrowly defeating the United National Party (UNP) candidate, Jayaweera Kuruppu, by 24 votes. This was a significant upset as Kuruppu was a former member of the State Council of Ceylon and a principal organiser for the UNP in the district.

He re-contested the seat at 2nd parliamentary election, held between 24 May 1952 and 30 May 1952, losing to the UNP candidate Harold Weragama, who polled 12,785 votes (57.4% of the total vote) as opposed to Hettiarachchi's 9,257 votes (41.6% of the total vote).

Hettiarachchi ran again in the 3rd parliamentary election, held between 5 April 1956 and 10 April 1956, however this time as the Sri Lanka Freedom Party (SLFP) candidate, successfully regaining the seat of Nivitagala. He received 16,205 votes (66% of the total votes), 7,985 votes ahead of his UNP rival and sitting member, Weragama.

At the 4th parliamentary election, held on 19 March 1960, Hettiarachchi ran as the Mahajana Eksath Peramuna (MEP) candidate, winning the seat with 7,314 (39.4% of the total vote), 1,417 votes ahead of the UNP candidate, K. E. Seneviratne, and 4,581 votes ahead of the SLFP candidate, A. D. Abeysuriya. However, as neither of the major political parties managed to obtain a sufficient majority in the election a new election was called. At the subsequent July 1960 election Hettiarachchi lost the seat to the SLFP candidate, Stanley Molligoda, running third in a field of four candidates, only securing 22.6% of the total vote.

Hettiarachchi contested the next parliamentary elections, held on 22 March 1965, this time as the SLFP candidate, where he defeated the sitting member, Molligoda, who ran as the UNP candidate. Hettiarachchi polled 14,943 votes (58.5% of the total), as opposed to Molligoda's 9,981 votes (39.1% of the total).

Hettiarachchi died shortly before the May 1970 parliamentary elections, with the vacant seat of Nivitagala being filled by his SLFP replacement, Piyadasa Harischandra.
