= Mihintale Electoral District =

Electoral district of Sri Lanka, 1960–1989

Mihintale electoral district was an electoral district of Sri Lanka between March 1960 and February 1989. The district was named after the town of Mihintale in Anuradhapura District, North Central Province. The 1978 Constitution of Sri Lanka introduced the proportional representation electoral system for electing members of Parliament. The existing 160 mainly single-member electoral districts were replaced with 22 multi-member electoral districts. Mihintale electoral district was replaced by the Anuradhapura multi-member electoral district at the 1989 general elections, the first under the proportional representation system, continues to be a polling division of the multi-member electoral district.

== Members of Parliament ==
Key

Independent SLFP UNP

| Election | Member | Party | Term |
|---|---|---|---|
| 1960 (March) | | | |
| 1960 (July) | | | |
| 1965 | | | |
| 1970 | | | |
| 1977 | | | |

== Elections ==
=== 1960 (March) Parliamentary General Election ===
Results of the 4th parliamentary election held on 19 March 1960:

| Candidate | Party | Symbol | Votes | % |
|---|---|---|---|---|
| Valid Votes | | | | |
| Rejected Votes | | | | |
| Total Polled | | | | 100.00 |
| Registered Electors | | | | |
| Turnout | | | | |

=== 1960 (July) Parliamentary General Election ===
Results of the 5th parliamentary election held on 20 July 1960:

| Candidate | Party | Symbol | Votes | % |
|---|---|---|---|---|
| Valid Votes | | | | |
| Rejected Votes | | | | |
| Total Polled | | | | 100.00 |
| Registered Electors | | | | |
| Turnout | | | | |

=== 1965 Parliamentary General Election ===
Results of the 6th parliamentary election held on 22 March 1965:

| Candidate | Party | Symbol | Votes | % |
|---|---|---|---|---|
| Valid Votes | | | | |
| Rejected Votes | | | | |
| Total Polled | | | | 100.00 |
| Registered Electors | | | | |
| Turnout | | | | |

=== 1970 Parliamentary General Election ===
Results of the 7th parliamentary election held on 27 May 1970:

| Candidate | Party | Symbol | Votes | % |
|---|---|---|---|---|
| Valid Votes | | | | |
| Rejected Votes | | | | |
| Total Polled | | | | 100.00 |
| Registered Electors | | | | |
| Turnout | | | | |

=== 1977 Parliamentary General Election ===
Results of the 8th parliamentary election held on 21 July 1977:

| Candidate | Party | Symbol | Votes | % |
|---|---|---|---|---|
| Valid Votes | | | | |
| Rejected Votes | | | | |
| Total Polled | | | | 100.00 |
| Registered Electors | | | | |
| Turnout | | | | |
