= Ivan Dassanayake =

Ceylonese politician (1910-?)

Hon. Ivan Dassanyake OBE

Member of the Ceylon Parliament for Wariyapola
- In office 1947–1956
- Preceded by: seat created
- Succeeded by: A. M. Adikari

Personal details
- Born: Hewananarachchige Ivan Tiddy Dassanayake; 10 March 1910
- Died: Ceylon

Hewananarachchige Ivan Tiddy Dassanayake, OBE (10 March 1910 - ??) was a Ceylonese politician.

In 1947 Dassanayake was elected to the Parliament of Ceylon at the 1st parliamentary election, in the Wariyapola electorate, representing the United National Party. He secured 12,063 votes (79.5% of the total vote), defeating three other candidates to win the seat.

Dassanayake successfully retained the seat at the 2nd parliamentary election held in May 1952, where he received 19,622 votes (78.5% of the total vote). He was the Parliamentary Secretary to the Minister of Education.

In 1956 at the 3rd parliamentary elections he was defeated by the Sri Lanka Freedom Party candidate, A. M. Adikari, 19,470 votes (60.3% of the total vote) to 12,657 votes (39.2% of the total vote).

Dassanayake contested both the 4th parliamentary elections in March 1960 and the 5th parliamentary elections in July 1960 but was defeated on both occasions by Adikari.

He was appointed an Officer of the Order of the British Empire (OBE) in the 1955 Birthday honours.
