= Viyaluwa Electoral District =

Electoral district of Sri Lanka

Viyaluwa electoral district was an electoral district of Sri Lanka between July 1977 and February 1989. The district was named after the town of Viyaluwa in Badulla District, Uva Province. The 1978 Constitution of Sri Lanka introduced the proportional representation electoral system for electing members of Parliament. The existing 160 mainly single-member electoral districts were replaced with 22 multi-member electoral districts. Viyaluwa electoral district was replaced by the Badulla multi-member electoral district at the 1989 general elections, the first under the proportional representation system.

== Members of Parliament ==
Key

Independent SLFP UNP

Election	Member	Party	Term
1977			
