= Anuradhapura West Electoral District =

Electoral district of Sri Lanka between July 1977 and February 1989

Anuradhapura West electoral district was an electoral district of Sri Lanka between July 1977 and February 1989. The district was named after the town of Anuradhapura in Anuradhapura District, North Central Province. The 1978 Constitution of Sri Lanka introduced the proportional representation electoral system for electing members of Parliament. The existing 160 mainly single-member electoral districts were replaced with 22 multi-member electoral districts. Anuradhapura West electoral district was replaced by the Anuradhapura multi-member electoral district at the 1989 general elections, the first under the proportional representation system, though Anuradhapura continues to be a polling division of the multi-member electoral district.

== Members of Parliament ==
Key

Independent SLFP UNP

Election	Member	Party	Term
1977	K. D. M. C. Bandara	United National Party	1970-89

== Elections ==
=== 1977 Parliamentary General Election ===
Results of the 8th parliamentary election held on 21 July 1977:

Candidate	Party	Symbol	Votes	%
K. D. M. C. Bandara	United National Party	Elephant	13,942	53.00
Herath Banda Semasinghe	Sri Lanka Freedom Party	Hand	11,087	42.18
K. H. Chandrapala		Bell	797	3.03
Kalu Bandage Mudiyanse		Star	354	1.35
Valid Votes			26,180	99.53
Rejected Votes			125	0.48
Total Polled			26,305	100.00
Registered Electors			30,233	
Turnout				87.01
