= Mervyn Kularatne =

Sri Lankan politician

Mervyn Kularatne (17 August 1938 – ??) was a Sri Lankan politician. He was the former Deputy Minister of Defence. He was elected to parliament from the Eheliyagoda defeating Vasudeva Nanayakkara in the 1977 general election.
