= Galigamuwa Electoral District =

Electoral district of Sri Lanka

Galigamuwa electoral district was an electoral district of Sri Lanka between March 1960 and February 1989. The district was named after the town of Galigamuwa in Kegalle District, Sabaragamuwa Province. The 1978 Constitution of Sri Lanka introduced the proportional representation electoral system for electing members of Parliament. The existing 160 mainly single-member electoral districts were replaced with 22 multi-member electoral districts. Galigamuwa electoral district was replaced by the Kegalle multi-member electoral district at the 1989 general elections.

== Members of Parliament ==
Key

Independent SLFP UNP

Election	Member	Party	Term
1960 (March)			
1960 (July)			
1965			
1970			
1977	wimala kannangara	United National Party	

== Elections ==
=== 1960 (March) Parliamentary General Election ===
Candidate	Party	Symbol	Votes	%
Valid Votes				100.00%
Rejected Votes				
Total Polled				
Registered Electors				
Turnout				

=== 1960 (July) Parliamentary General Election ===
Candidate	Party	Symbol	Votes	%
Valid Votes				100.00%
Rejected Votes				
Total Polled				
Registered Electors				
Turnout				

=== 1965 Parliamentary General Election ===
Candidate	Party	Symbol	Votes	%
Valid Votes				100.00%
Rejected Votes				
Total Polled				
Registered Electors				
Turnout				

=== 1970 Parliamentary General Election ===
Candidate	Party	Symbol	Votes	%
Valid Votes				100.00%
Rejected Votes				
Total Polled				
Registered Electors				
Turnout				

=== 1977 Parliamentary General Election ===
Candidate	Party	Symbol	Votes	%
Valid Votes				100.00%
Rejected Votes				
Total Polled				
Registered Electors				
Turnout				
