= R. R. W. Rajapakse =

Ceylonese politician (1924–1966)

Rajapakse Dewage Ranapala Wijayawardena Rajapakse (1924-1966) was a Ceylonese politician. He was the Member of Parliament from the Dodangaslanda from 1965 to 1966. Rajapakse first contested the Dodangaslanda electorate in March 1960 general elections and in the July 1960 general elections, but was defeated by the United National Party candidate A. U. Romanis and again in the July 1960 general elections. He contested 1965 general elections and won defeating Romanis. He died in office in 1966 and was succeeded by his wife, Leticia Rajapakse in a by election in 1967.
