= M. A. J. Wijesinghe =

Sri Lankan politician (born 1920)

Mutukuda Arachchige Jayasinghe Wijesinghe (born 1 August 1920) was a Sri Lankan politician. He was a member of Parliament of Sri Lanka from Wariyapola representing the Sri Lanka Freedom Party.

Wijesinghe first contested from Wariyapola in the 1962 by-election following the death of A. M. Adikari and was elected parliament. He lost his seat in the 1965 general election to D. M. Tilakaratna Bandara. He was re-elected in the 1970 general election, but lost the 1977 general election.
