= M. A. Adikari =

Ceylonese politician (1920–1962)

Hon. M. A. Adikari MP

Member of the Ceylon Parliament for Wariyapola
- In office 1956–1962
- Preceded by: Ivan Dassanayake
- Succeeded by: M. A. J. Wijesinghe

Personal details
- Born: Adikari Mudiyanselage Appuhamy Adikari; 26 December 1920
- Died: 17 October 1962 (aged 41) Ceylon
- Party: Sri Lanka Freedom Party
- Education: Maliyadeva College, Nalanda College, Pembroke Academy

Adikari Mudiyanselage Appuhamy, Adikari (26 December 1920 - 17 October 1962) was a Ceylonese landowner, businessman and politician.

Adikari was born on 26 December 1920 and was educated at Maliyadeva College, Kurunegala, Nalanda College and Pembroke Academy, Colombo.

He was elected to the Kalugamuwa Urban Council and as its chairman in 1949.

Adikari contested the seat of Wariyapola at the 2nd parliamentary election held in May 1952. He lost to the incumbent, Ivan Dassanayake by 12,532 votes. He challenged again at the 3rd parliamentary election held in April 1956. This time he was successful, representing the Sri Lanka Freedom Party, securing 60% of the total vote, defeating Dassanayake by 6,813 votes.

He retained his seat at the 4th parliamentary election, held on 19 March 1960, defeating Dassanayake by 2,722 votes and at the subsequent 5th parliamentary election, held on 20 July 1960, again defeating Dassanayake, this time by 2,739 votes.

On 5 August 1960 he was appointed Deputy Chairman of Committees, serving in that position until 17 October 1962.

Adikari died on 17 October 1962, whilst still in office. His parliamentary seat was taken up by D. M. Tilakaratne Bandara, who was elected at the Parliamentary by-election held on 19 December 1962.

Adikari Mawatha in Wariyapola is named after him.
