= Anuradhapura East Electoral District =

Defunct electoral district in Sri Lanka

Anuradhapura East electoral district was an electoral district of Sri Lanka between July 1977 and February 1989. The district was named after the town of Anuradhapura in Anuradhapura District, North Central Province. The 1978 Constitution of Sri Lanka introduced the proportional representation electoral system for electing members of Parliament. The existing 160 mainly single-member electoral districts were replaced with 22 multi-member electoral districts. Anuradhapura East electoral district was replaced by the Anuradhapura multi-member electoral district at the 1989 general elections, the first under the proportional representation system, though Anuradhapura continues to be a polling division of the multi-member electoral district.

== Members of Parliament ==
Key

Independent SLFP UNP

Election	Member	Party	Term
1977	W. Y. Herath	United National Party	1977-89

== Elections ==
=== 1977 Parliamentary General Election ===
Results of the 8th parliamentary election held on 21 July 1977:

Candidate	Party	Symbol	Votes	%
W. Y. Herath	United National Party	Elephant	13,948	52.34
K. B. Ratnayake	Sri Lanka Freedom Party	Hand	12,066	45.28
K. E. Silva		Key	531	1.99
Valid Votes			26,545	99.61
Rejected Votes			105	0.39
Total Polled			26,650	100.00
Registered Electors			35,451	
Turnout				75.17
