= Eheliyagoda Electoral District =

Electoral district of Sri Lanka

Eheliyagoda electoral district was an electoral district of Sri Lanka between July 1977 and February 1989. The district was named after the town of Eheliyagoda in Ratnapura District, Sabaragamuwa Province. The 1978 Constitution of Sri Lanka introduced the proportional representation electoral system for electing members of Parliament. The existing 160 mainly single-member electoral districts were replaced by 22 multi-member electoral districts. Eheliyagoda electoral district was replaced by the Ratnapura multi-member electoral district at the 1989 general elections, the first under the proportional representation system.

== Members of Parliament ==
Key

Independent SLFP UNP

| Election | Member | Party | Term |
|---|---|---|---|
| 1977 | Mervyn Kularatne | United National Party | |

== Elections ==
=== 1977 Parliamentary General Election ===
Results of the 8th parliamentary election held on 21 July 1977 for the district:

| Candidate | Party | Symbol | Votes | % |
|---|---|---|---|---|
| Mervyn Kularatne | | Elephant | 21,776 | 50.54 |
| Vasudeva Nanayakkara | | Umbrella | 14,804 | 34.36 |
| Dharmaprema Jayawardena | | Hand | 6,128 | 14.22 |
| T. Dharmapala | | Tree | 211 | 0.49 |
| Rohana Wijesighe | | Lamp | 103 | 0.24 |
| Wickremasinghe Jayasekera | | Bell | 42 | 0.10 |
| Valid Votes | | | 43,064 | 99.94 |
| Rejected Votes | | | 25 | 0.06 |
| Total Polled | | | 43,089 | 100.00 |
| Registered Electors | | | 48,447 | |
| Turnout | | | | 88.94 |
