= Aranayaka Electoral District =

Electoral district of Sri Lanka

Aranayaka electoral district was an electoral district of Sri Lanka between July 1977 and February 1989. The district was named after the town of Aranayaka in Kegalle District, Sabaragamuwa Province. The 1978 Constitution of Sri Lanka introduced the proportional representation electoral system for electing members of Parliament. The existing 160 mainly single-member electoral districts were replaced with 22 multi-member electoral districts. Aranayaka electoral district was replaced by the Kegalle multi-member electoral district at the 1989 general elections, the first under the proportional representation system.

== Members of Parliament ==
Key

Independent SLFP UNP

Election	Member	Party	Term
1977	Wasantha Udayaratne	United National Party	1977-1989

== Elections ==
=== 1977 Parliamentary General Election ===
Results of the 8th parliamentary election held on 21 July 1977 for the district:

Candidate	Party	Symbol	Votes	%
Wasantha Udayaratne	United National Party	Elephant	15,758	61.03
A. Muthunayake	Sri Lanka Freedom Party	Hand	9,578	37.10
T. Piyadasa		Key	300	0.49
H. G. Gunaratna		Lamp	127	3.02
Valid Votes			25,763	99.78
Rejected Votes			57	0.22
Total Polled			25,820	100.00
Registered Electors			29,269	
Turnout				88.22
