= Anamaduwa Electoral District =

Electoral district of Sri Lanka

Anamaduwa electoral district was an electoral district of Sri Lanka between July 1977 and February 1989. The district was named after the town of Anamaduwa in Puttalam District, North Western Province. The 1978 Constitution of Sri Lanka introduced the proportional representation electoral system for electing members of Parliament. The existing 160 mainly single-member electoral districts were replaced with 22 multi-member electoral districts. Anamaduwa electoral district was replaced by the Puttalam multi-member electoral district at the 1989 general elections, the first under the proportional representation system.

== Members of Parliament ==
Key

Independent SLFP UNP

Election	Member	Party	Term
1977	Saddhatissa Wadigamangawa	Sri Lanka Freedom Party	1977–1989

== Elections ==
=== 1977 Parliamentary General Election ===
Results of the 8th parliamentary election held on 21 July 1977 for the district:

Candidate	Party	Symbol	Votes	%
Saddhatissa Wadigamangawa		Hand	16,497	49.99
M. M. Chandrasena		Elephant	15,414	46.71
H. M. Abhayaratne		Key	512	1.55
N. K. Senanayake		Chair	181	0.55
R. A. H. M. Raja Kirimetiyawa		Flower	175	0.53
D.B. E. Illangakoon		Lamp	144	0.44
Valid Votes			32,923	99.76
Rejected Votes			79	0.24
Total Polled			33,002	100.00
Registered Electors			38,835	
Turnout				82.41
