= Walapane Electoral District =

Former electoral district of Sri Lanka

Walapane electoral district was an electoral district of Sri Lanka between March 1960 and February 1989. The district was named after the town of Walapane in Nuwara Eliya District, Central Province. The 1978 Constitution of Sri Lanka introduced the proportional representation electoral system for electing members of Parliament. The existing 160 mainly single-member electoral districts were replaced with 22 multi-member electoral districts. Walapane electoral district was replaced by the Nuwara Eliya multi-member electoral district at the 1989 general elections.

== Members of Parliament ==
Key

Independent SLFP UNP

Election	Member	Party	Term
1960 (March)			
1960 (July)			
1965			
1970			
1977			

== Elections ==
=== 1960 (March) Parliamentary General Election ===
Results of the 4th parliamentary election held on 19 March 1960:

Candidate	Party	Symbol	Votes	%
Valid Votes				
Rejected Votes				
Total Polled				100.00
Registered Electors				
Turnout				

=== 1960 (July) Parliamentary General Election ===
Results of the 5th parliamentary election held on 20 July 1960:

Candidate	Party	Symbol	Votes	%
Valid Votes				
Rejected Votes				
Total Polled				100.00
Registered Electors				
Turnout				

=== 1965 Parliamentary General Election ===
Results of the 6th parliamentary election held on 22 March 1965:

Candidate	Party	Symbol	Votes	%
Valid Votes				
Rejected Votes				
Total Polled				100.00
Registered Electors				
Turnout				

=== 1970 Parliamentary General Election ===
Results of the 7th parliamentary election held on 27 May 1970:

Candidate	Party	Symbol	Votes	%
Valid Votes				
Rejected Votes				
Total Polled				100.00
Registered Electors				
Turnout				

=== 1977 Parliamentary General Election ===
Results of the 7th parliamentary election held on 21 July 1977:

Candidate	Party	Symbol	Votes	%
Valid Votes				
Rejected Votes				
Total Polled				100.00
Registered Electors				
Turnout				
