= Laggala Electoral District =

Electoral district of Sri Lanka

Laggala electoral district was an electoral district of Sri Lanka between March 1960 and February 1989. The district was named after the town of Laggala in Matale District, Central Province. The 1978 Constitution of Sri Lanka introduced the proportional representation electoral system for electing members of Parliament. The existing 160 mainly single-member electoral districts were replaced with 22 multi-member electoral districts. Laggala electoral district was replaced by the Matale multi-member electoral district at the 1989 general elections.

== Members of Parliament ==
Key

Independent SLFP UNP

Election	Member	Party	Term
1960 (March)	K. M. K. Banda	Sri Lanka Freedom Party	1960
1960 (July)	K. M. K. Banda	Sri Lanka Freedom Party	1960-1965
1965	P. G. Muthubanda	United National Party	1965-1970
1970	M. C. Gopallawa	Sri Lanka Freedom Party	1970-1977
1977	J. G. Wijeratne Banda	United National Party	1977-1989

== Elections ==
=== 1960 (March) Parliamentary General Election ===
Results of the 4th parliamentary election held on 19 March 1960:

Candidate	Party	Symbol	Votes	%
K. M. K. Banda	Sri Lanka Freedom Party	Hand	3,073	39.16
P. B. Ekanayake	United National Party	Elephant	1,542	19.65
H. M. K. Gunatilake		Tumbler	1,274	16.24
D. Piyumasinghe Yapa		Cartwheel	871	
Alfred Somaratne		Eye	399	
K. D. J. W. Sumanasekera		Key	346	
W. Dias Desinghe		Umbrella	117	
Sydney Tenne		Clock	57	
Valid Votes			7,679	97.86
Rejected Votes			168	2.14
Total Polled			7,847	100.00
Registered Electors			11,000	
Turnout				71.34

=== 1960 (July) Parliamentary General Election ===
Results of the 5th parliamentary election held on 20 July 1960:

Candidate	Party	Symbol	Votes	%
K. M. K. Banda	Sri Lanka Freedom Party	Hand	4,629	56.61
P. G. Muthubanda	United National Party	Elephant	3,438	42.05
Valid Votes			8,067	98.66
Rejected Votes			110	1.34
Total Polled			8,177	100.00
Registered Electors			11,000	
Turnout				74.34

=== 1965 Parliamentary General Election ===
Results of the 6th parliamentary election held on 22 March 1965:

Candidate	Party	Symbol	Votes	%
P. G. Muthubanda	United National Party	Elephant	6,342	
K. M. K. Banda	Sri Lanka Freedom Party	Hand	4,767	
H. M. Muthubanda		Sun	325	
L. P. Banda		Cartwheel	176	
Valid Votes				
Rejected Votes				
Total Polled				100.00
Registered Electors				
Turnout				

=== 1970 Parliamentary General Election ===
Results of the 7th parliamentary election held on 27 May 1970:

Candidate	Party	Symbol	Votes	%
Valid Votes				
Rejected Votes				
Total Polled				100.00
Registered Electors				
Turnout				

=== 1977 Parliamentary General Election ===
Results of the 7th parliamentary election held on 21 July 1977:

Candidate	Party	Symbol	Votes	%
Valid Votes				
Rejected Votes				
Total Polled				100.00
Registered Electors				
Turnout				
