= K. M. K. Banda =

Sri Lankan politician

K. M. K. Banda was a Sri Lankan politician. He was the member of Parliament of Sri Lanka from Laggala representing the Sri Lanka Freedom Party.

He was elected to parliament from Laggala in the March 1960 general election and was re-elected from July 1960 general election defeating P. G. Muthubanda. He lost is seat in the 1965 general election to Muthubanda of the United National Party.
