= Wimala Kannangara =

Sri Lankan politician (1920–2006)

Hon. Wimala Kannangara

Member of Parliament for Galigamuwa
- In office March 1960 – July 1960
- In office 1965–1970
- In office 1977–1989

Personal details
- Born: 15 June 1920
- Died: January 2006
- Party: United National Party
- Spouse: Don Peter Kannangara

Irene Wimala Kannangara (15 June 1920 - January 2006) was a Sri Lankan politician and a former member of the Parliament of Sri Lanka. At the 8th parliamentary election, held on 21 July 1977, she was elected to the seat of Galigamuwa. Kannangara, the United National Party candidate, received 18,608 (54% of the total vote) defeating the Sri Lanka Freedom Party nominee, Jagathsiri Balasuriya, who polled 14,853 (43% of the total vote).

She was married to Dr Don Peter Kannangara, LMS of Kegalle.
