= Hali-Ela Electoral District =

Electoral district of Sri Lanka

Hali-Ela electoral district was an electoral district of Sri Lanka between July 1977 and February 1989. The district was named after the town of Hali-Ela in Badulla District, Uva Province. The 1978 Constitution of Sri Lanka introduced the proportional representation electoral system for electing members of Parliament. The existing 160 mainly single-member electoral districts were replaced with 22 multi-member electoral districts. Hali-Ela electoral district was replaced by the Badulla multi-member electoral district at the 1989 general elections, the first under the proportional representation system.

== Members of Parliament ==
Key

Independent SLFP UNP

Election	Member	Party	Term
1977			
