= M. P. de Z. Siriwardena =

Ceylonese politician (1906–1978)

Michael Paul de Zoysa Siriwardena (6 September 1906 – 15 October 1978) was a Ceylonese politician. He was a Cabinet Minister and Chief Government Whip. He served as Member of Parliament from the Minuwangoda from 1960 to 1977.

Siriwardena was elected to Parliament from the Minuwangoda Electoral District in the Parliamentary elections in March 1960 from the Sri Lanka Freedom Party retaining the seat in the subsequent elections in July that year. He was appointed as the Minister of Labour and Nationalised Services in 1960 and served until 1963, when he was appointed Minister of Public Works and Post. In 1964 he was appointed Chief Government Whip. He was re-elected in the Parliamentary elections in 1965 and Parliamentary elections in 1970.

He was a cousin of Stanley de Zoysa, Minister of Finance.
