= Harold Weragama =

Ceylonese politician

Hon. W. H. Weragama

Member of the Ceylon Parliament for Nivitgala
- In office 1952–1956
- Preceded by: Don Frank Hettiarachchi
- Succeeded by: Don Frank Hettiarachchi

Personal details
- Born: William Harold Weragama; 1907
- Died: 1988 (aged 80–81)
- Party: United National Party
- Spouse: Amitha née Katugaha

William Harold Weragama (1907 – 1988) was a Ceylonese politician.

Weragama was elected to parliament, as the member for the Nivitigala electorate, at the 2nd parliamentary election, held between 24 May 1952 and 30 May 1952, defeating the sitting member, D. F. Hettiarachchi, polling 12,785 votes (57.4% of the total vote) as opposed to Hettiarachchi's 9,257 votes (41.6% of the total vote).

Weragama re-contested the seat at the 3rd parliamentary election, held between 5 April 1956 and 10 April 1956, losing to the Sri Lanka Freedom Party (SLFP) candidate, Hettiarachchi, who received 16,205 votes (66% of the total votes), 7,985 votes ahead of Weragama.
