= Harispattuwa Electoral District =

Electoral district of Sri Lanka

Harispattuwa electoral district was an electoral district of Sri Lanka between July 1977 and February 1989. The district was named after the town of Harispattuwa in Kandy District, Central Province. The 1978 Constitution of Sri Lanka introduced the proportional representation electoral system for electing members of Parliament. The existing 160 mainly single-member electoral districts were replaced with 22 multi-member electoral districts. Harispattuwa electoral district was replaced by the multi-member electoral district at the 1989 general elections, the first under the proportional representation system.

== Members of Parliament ==
Key

Independent SLFP UNP

Election	Member	Party	Term
1977	Abdul Cader Shahul Hameed	United National Party	1977

== Elections ==
=== 1977 Parliamentary General Election ===
Results of the 7th parliamentary election held on 21 July 1977:

Candidate	Party	Symbol	Votes	%
Abdul Cader Shahul Hameed	United National Party	Elephant	49,173	39.72
R. Premachandra Wijesiri		Umbrella	23,943	19.34
Heenbanda Ratnayake		Scales	23,671	19.12
G. Sirisena Dayananda		Umbrella	12,539	10.13
H. M. Mauroof		Lamp	10,854	8.77
Valid Votes			122,193	98.71
Rejected Votes			1,597	1.29
Total Polled			123,790	100.00
Registered Electors			169,295	
Turnout				73.12
