= Leticia Rajapakse =

Ceylonese social worker

- Born: Dedigama Dewage Lilian Leticia Rajapakse
- Occupations: social worker, member of Sri Lanka Parliament

Dedigama Dewage Lilian Leticia Rajapakse was a Ceylonese social worker. She was elected Member of Parliament from the Dodangaslanda Electoral District in a by election on 15 January 1967 from the Sri Lanka Freedom Party. She succeeded the seat made vacant by the death of her husband R. R. W. Rajapakse. She served until 1970 when the parliament was dissolved for fresh elections.
