= Udadumbara Electoral District =

Former Sri Lankan electorate

Udadumbara electoral district was an electoral district of Sri Lanka between July 1977 and February 1989. The district was named after the town of Udadumbara in Kandy District, Central Province. The 1978 Constitution of Sri Lanka introduced the proportional representation electoral system for electing members of Parliament. The existing 160 mainly single-member electoral districts were replaced with 22 multi-member electoral districts. Udadumbara electoral district was replaced by the multi-member electoral district at the 1989 general elections, the first under the proportional representation system.

== Members of Parliament ==
Key

Independent SLFP UNP

| Election | Member | Party | Term |
|---|---|---|---|
| 1977 | R. B. Attanayake | United National Party | 1977-1989 |

== Elections ==
=== 1977 Parliamentary General Election ===
Results of the 7th parliamentary election held on 21 July 1977:

| Candidate | Party | Symbol | Votes | % |
|---|---|---|---|---|
| R. B. Attanayake | United National Party | Elephant | 12,243 | 53.31 |
| M. Seneviratne Banda | Sri Lanka Freedom Party | Hand | 9,841 | 42.85 |
| Y. M. Gunatilleke | | Lamp | 543 | 2.36 |
| Piyasiri Abeykoon | | Key | 279 | 1.22 |
| W. M. Muthubanda | | Umbrella | 60 | 0.26 |
| Valid Votes | | | 22,870 | 99.58 |
| Rejected Votes | | | 96 | 0.42 |
| Total Polled | | | 22,966 | 100.00 |
| Registered Electors | | | 25,575 | |
| Turnout | | | | 89.80 |
