= Gamini Atukorale =

Sri Lankan politician (1951–2002)

Hon. Gamini Atukorale

Minister of Transport, Highways, and Civil Aviation

Member of Parliament for Nivithigala

Personal details
- Born: 2 April 1951 Ratnapura, Sri Lanka
- Died: 1 January 2002 (aged 50) Ratnapura, Sri Lanka
- Spouse(s): Harindrani Atukorale nee Dissanayake
- Occupation: Politician
- Profession: Lawyer

Gamini Atukorale (2 April 1951 – 1 January 2002) was a former Transport, Highways and Civil Aviation Minister in Sri Lanka and former General Secretary and Deputy Leader of United National Party. Former member of parliament Thalatha Atukorale is the sister of Gamini Atukorale.

== Death ==
Atukorale died as a result of a cardiac arrest on 1 January 2002 at his residence in Ratnapura. In 2005, UPFA Presidential candidate's election coordinator, former Minister Mangala Samaraweera termed Atukorale's death suspicious and proposed a "Special Commission" to probe it.

== See also ==
List of political families in Sri Lanka
