= A. U. Romanis =

Ceylonese politician

Aruma Upasakage Romanis (born 27 April 1908) was a Ceylonese politician. He was the Member of Parliament for Dodangaslanda from 1960 to 1965.

Romanis started his political life with the support of Sir John Lionel Kotelawala. When Kotelawala retired from politics, he recommended Romanis as his party candidate for the Dodangaslanda Electorate for the March 1960 general elections and then July 1960 general elections, where he won the seat defeating the Sri Lanka Freedom Party candidate R. R. W. Rajapakse.
