= Mahen Gunasekera =

Sri Lankan politician

Senerath Gunesekera Vidaneralalage Mahen Dias Gunasekera (born 29 March 1953) was a Sri Lankan lawyer and politician. He was elected from the Gampaha District from the United National Party to the Parliament of Sri Lanka in the 1989 general elections and served as Deputy Minister of Justice. He was the third son of Bennet Gunasekera.

== See also ==
- List of political families in Sri Lanka
