= Pathadumbara Electoral District =

Electoral district of Sri Lanka

Pathadumbara electoral district was an electoral district of Sri Lanka between July 1977 and February 1989. The district was named after the town of Pathadumbara in Kandy District, Central Province. The 1978 Constitution of Sri Lanka introduced the proportional representation electoral system for electing members of Parliament. The existing 160 mainly single-member electoral districts were replaced with 22 multi-member electoral districts. Pathadumbara electoral district was replaced by the multi-member electoral district at the 1989 general elections, the first under the proportional representation system.

== Members of Parliament ==
Key

Independent SLFP UNP

Election	Member	Party	Term
1977	T. B. Werapitiya	United National Party	

== Elections ==
=== 1977 Parliamentary General Election ===
Results of the 7th parliamentary election held on 21 July 1977:

Candidate	Party	Symbol	Votes	%
T. B. Werapitiya	United National Party	Elephant	19,936	65.90
A. G. Fernando	Sri Lanka Freedom Party	Hand	9,439	31.20
V. W. Jayasiri Perera		Star	771	2.55
Valid Votes			30,146	99.65
Rejected Votes			105	0.35
Total Polled			30,251	100.00
Registered Electors			34,865	
Turnout				86.77
