= T. B. Werapitiya =

Sri Lankan cricketer (1924–1996)

Tikiri Banda Werapitiya

Member of Parliament for Pathadumbara
- In office 1977–1989

Personal details
- Born: July 16, 1924 Kandy, Sri Lanka
- Died: May 18, 1996 (aged 71) Kandy, Sri Lanka
- Party: United National Party
- Education: Trinity College, Kandy
- Occupation: Politician
- Profession: Police Officer

Military service
- Allegiance: Sri Lanka
- Branch/service: Sri Lanka Police Service
- Years of service: 1950 - 1974
- Rank: Deputy Inspector-General of Police

Tikiri Banda 'T. B.' Werapitiya (16 July 1924 – 18 May 1996) was a Sri Lankan police officer and a politician. He was the former Minister of Internal Security.

Werapitiya was born on 16 July 1924 the youngest of three sons to S. B. Werapitiya, the Rate Mahatmaya of Pathadumbara in Kandy. He was educated at Trinity College, Kandy and graduated from University of Ceylon. He then became a teacher at Jinaraja College, Gampola, and later at Mahinda College, Galle. He also played for the All Ceylon Cricket Team, captained by B.R. Heyn.

He then joined the Ceylon Police Force as a Probationary Assistant Superintendent of Police. Serving may capacities including Director of the Police Training School, he reached the rank of Senior Deputy Inspector General of Police retiring in 1974.

He entered politics in 1977, contesting the Pathadumbara Electoral District and gaining a seat in Parliament. He was appointed Deputy Minister of Defence and later Minister of Internal Security by President J. R. Jayewardene. He was the President of the Cricket Board in 1979.

Retiring from politics in 1989, he died on 18 May 1996.

== See also ==
- Sri Lankan Civil War
