= 1947 Ceylonese parliamentary election =

First Ceylonese Parliamentary elections (1947)

- 23 August–20 September 1947

95 seats in the House of Representatives of Ceylon 48 seats were needed for a majority
- Turnout: ▲61.3%
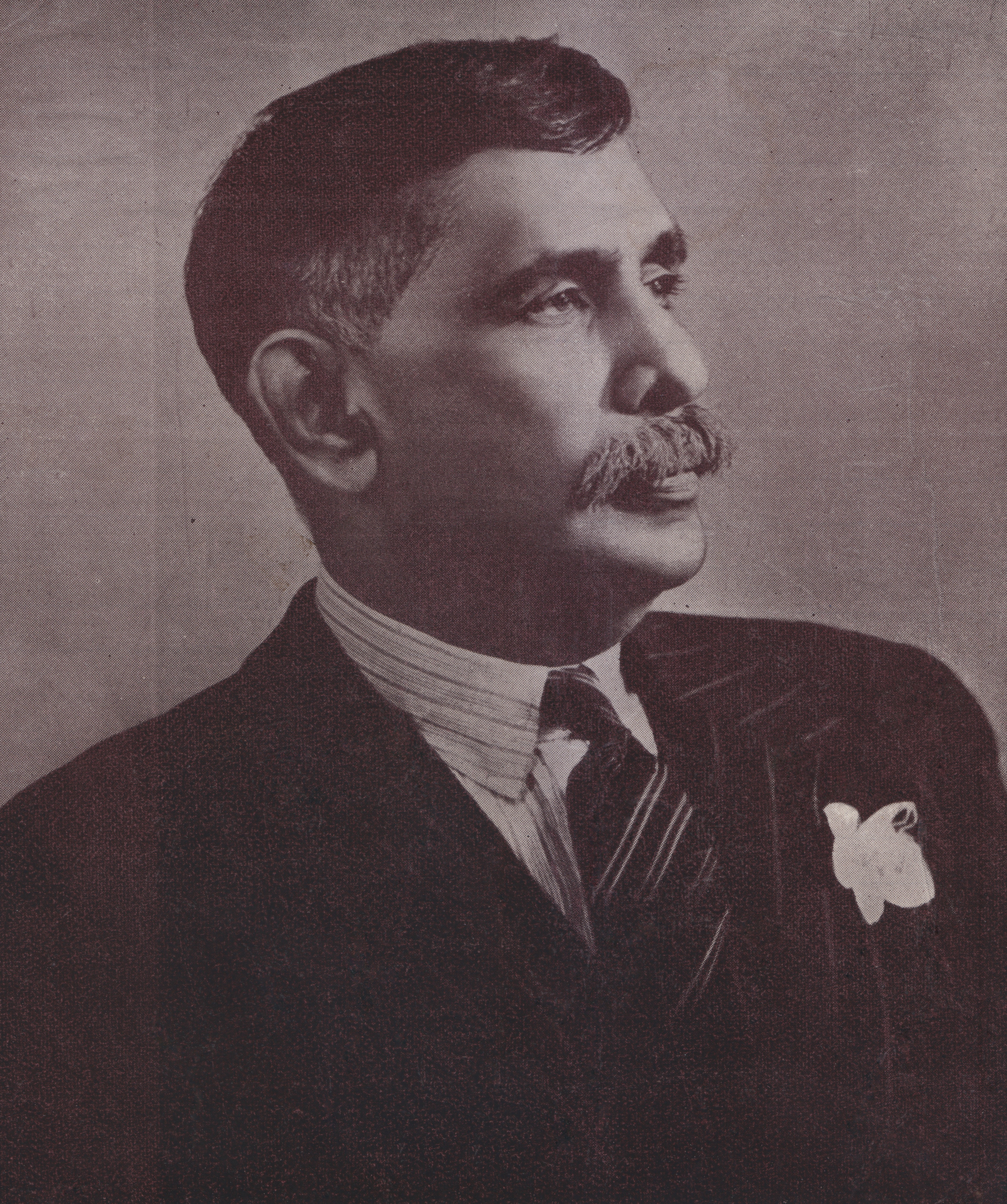

	First party	Second party
Leader	D. S. Senanayake	N. M. Perera
Party	UNP	LSSP
Leader since	1946	1945
Leader's seat	Mirigama	Ruwanwella
Seats won	42	10
Popular vote	751,432	204,020
Percentage	39.81%	10.81%
- Results by constituency
Prime Minister before election
Position established
Prime Minister after election
D. S. Senanayake
UNP

Parliamentary elections were held in British Ceylon between 23 August and 20 September 1947. They were the first elections overseen and administered by the newly formed Department of Parliamentary Elections ahead of independence. The election resulted in a hung parliament, with the United National Party entering into coalition with the All Ceylon Tamil Congress.

== Background ==
This is considered the first national election held in British Ceylon. Although it took place before independence was actually granted, it was the first election under the Soulbury Constitution. The constituencies were drawn up by an independent panel led by the Chief Justice of Ceylon to ensure that minority groups would have a greater chance of representation proportionate to their numbers in Ceylon.

Some of the major figures who had led the independence struggle were found in the right-wing United National Party led by D.S. Senanayake. In opposition were the Trotskyist Lanka Sama Samaja Party and Bolshevik Leninist Party of India, the Communist Party of Ceylon, the Ceylon Indian Congress and an array of independents. Each candidate in each constituency was each allocated a symbol on the ballot paper, instead of a colour as was previously used, for the benefit of voters who were illiterate. The symbols were different in each constituency so there was no unified symbol for each party.

== Results ==
Senanayake's UNP fell short of a majority, but was able to form a government in coalition with the All Ceylon Tamil Congress, which had taken most of the seats in the Tamil-majority regions of the island.

This was the last parliamentary elections for Ceylon under British rule before Ceylon's independence from the British Empire. They obtained full independence as a dominion in 1948. The British nevertheless retained military bases in the country and English remained as the official language along with much of the administrative system put in place by the British along with British officials.

Party	Votes	%	Seats
United National Party	751,432	39.81	42
Lanka Sama Samaja Party	204,020	10.81	10
BSP–BLP	113,193	6.00	5
All Ceylon Tamil Congress	82,499	4.37	7
Ceylon Indian Congress	72,230	3.83	6
Communist Party of Ceylon	70,331	3.73	3
Ceylon Labour Party	38,932	2.06	1
United Lanka Congress	3,953	0.21	0
Swaraj Party	1,393	0.07	0
Independents	549,381	29.11	21
Total	1,887,364	100.00	95
Total votes	1,701,150	–	
Registered voters/turnout	3,048,145	55.81	
Source: Nohlen et al. (Note: Actual turnout was slightly higher due to H. S. Ismail (UNP) being elected from Puttalam Electoral District without a contest.)
