= March 1960 Ceylonese parliamentary election =

- 19 March 1960

151 seats in the House of Representatives of Ceylon 76 seats were needed for a majority
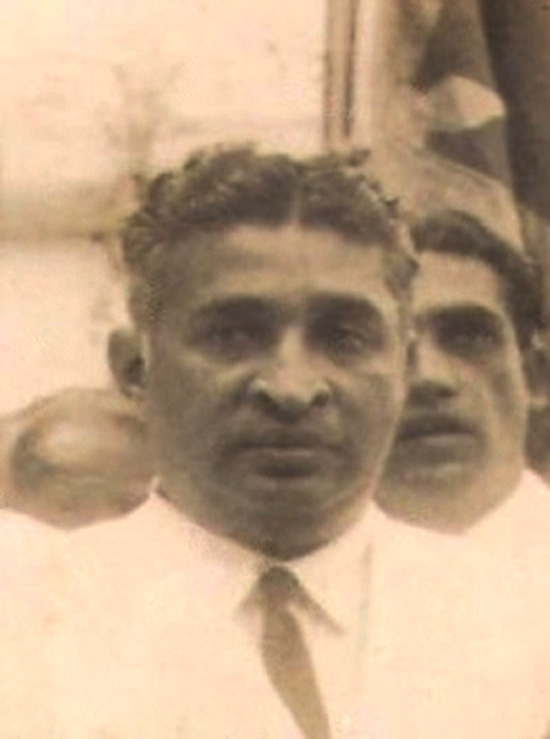

	First party	Second party
Leader	Dudley Senanayake	C. P. de Silva
Party	UNP	SLFP
Leader since	1957	1960
Leader's seat	Dedigama	Minneriya
Last election	27.91%, 8 seats	39.52%, 51 seats (Note: As the Mahajana Eksath Peramuna)
Seats won	50	46
Seat change	▲42	▼5
Popular vote	909,043	647,175
Percentage	29.89%	21.28%
Swing	▲1.98pp	▼18.24pp
Prime Minister before election
Wijeyananda Dahanayake
MEP
Prime Minister-designate
Dudley Senanayake
UNP

Parliamentary elections were held in Ceylon on 19 March 1960.

== Background ==
By 1960, Ceylon's governing Mahajana Eksath Peramuna (MEP) coalition was falling apart. The Marxist parties that were junior partners of the coalition had broken with the dominant Sri Lanka Freedom Party over the issue of paddy lands. The Marxist Viplavakari Lanka Sama Samaja Party formed a new party that took the name MEP. The SLFP itself had been torn by an internal power struggle since the death of its leader, S. W. R. D. Bandaranaike, the previous year.

Both the United National Party and the SLFP campaigned on a strongly anti-Tamil line, promising to repatriate the estate Tamils to India, and implement the Sinhala Only Act.

== Results ==
Dudley Senanayake and the UNP obtained a plurality of seats, but without a majority could not form a stable government. This led to the July 1960 elections.

Party	Votes	%	Seats
United National Party	909,043	29.39	50
Sri Lanka Freedom Party	647,175	20.92	46
Lanka Sama Samaja Party	325,286	10.52	10
Mahajana Eksath Peramuna	324,332	10.49	10
Illankai Tamil Arasu Kachchi	176,444	5.70	15
Communist Party of Ceylon	147,612	4.77	3
Lanka Democratic Party	135,138	4.37	4
All Ceylon Tamil Congress	38,275	1.24	1
Socialist People's Front of Ceylon	23,253	0.75	1
Sinhala National Association	13,835	0.45	0
Ceylon Independent Congress	11,321	0.37	0
National Liberation Front	11,201	0.36	2
Sri Lanka National Front	11,115	0.36	1
Bosath Bandaranaike Front	9,749	0.32	1
Ceylon Democratic Congress	8,877	0.29	0
Tamil Speaking Front	8,699	0.28	0
Udarata Peramuna	6,741	0.22	0
Buddhist Republican Party	1,188	0.04	0
Sri Lanka Dharma Rajya Party	744	0.02	0
Ceylon Socialist Party	171	0.01	0
Others	282,797	9.14	7
Total	3,092,996	100.00	151
Registered voters/turnout	3,724,507	77.6	
Source: Report on the Sixth Parliamentary General Election of Ceylon

== Provincial results ==
=== Western Province ===
==== Colombo District ====
Electorate	Elected Member	Symbol	Votes
1 Colombo North	V.A.Sugathadasa	Elephant	9,446
2 Colombo Central	M.C.M. Kaleel	Pair of Spectacles	33,121
	Pieter Keuneman	Star	30,574
	R. Premadasa	Elephant	29,828
3 Borella	R.B. Lenora	Elephant	7,261
4 Colombo South	Edmund Samarawickrema	Elephant	25,312
17 Kolonnawa	K.E. Perera	Cart Wheel	8,608
18 Kotte	A.J. Niyathapala	Elephant	8,850
19 Dehiwela Mt. Lavinia	S. de S. Jayasinghe	Elephant	12,971
20 Moratuwa	M. Ruskin Fernando	Elephant	10,262
21 Kesbewa	Somaweera Chandrasiri	Spoon	11,115
22 Kottawa	D.B.R. Gunawardena	Key	12,928
23 Homagama	Gamini Jayasuriya	Elephant	10,873
24 Avissawella	Philip Gunawardena	Cart Wheel	16,648

==== Gampaha District ====
Electorate	Elected Member	Symbol	Votes
5 Wattala	D. Shelton Jayasinghe	Elephant	9,665
6 Negombo	T. Quintin Fernando	Elephant	11,207
7 Katana	Wijayapala Mendis	Elephant	9,117
8 Divulapitiya	Percy Jayakody	Elephant	10,509
9 Mirigama	A.E. Jayasinghe	Hand	12,430
10 Minuwangoda	M.P. de Z. Siriwardena	Hand	11,565
11 Attanagalla	J.P. Obeysekera	Hand	20,985
12 Gampaha	S.D. Bandaranayake	Butterfly	9,565
13 Ja-ela	Paris Perera	Elephant	11,960
14 Mahara	S.K.K. Suriarachchi	Hand	15,098
15 Dompe	Felix Dias Bandaranaike	Hand	16,227
16 Kelaniya	J.R. Jayawardane	Elephant	10,227

==== Kalutara District ====
Electorate	Elected Member	Symbol	Votes
26 Bulathsinghala	Bibile Fonseka	Elephant	5,728
27 Bandaragama	D.C.W. Kannangara	Elephant	10,154
28 Panadura	Leslie Goonewardena	Key	9,266
29 Kalutara	Cholmondeley Goonewardena	Key	7,749
30 Beruwala	Mohamed A. Bakeer Markar	Elephant	9,339
31 Matugama	Dayasena T. Pasqual	Hand	7,099
32 Agalawatte	Anil Moonesinghe	Key	12,007

=== Central Province ===
==== Matale District ====
Electorate	Elected Member	Symbol	Votes
33 Dambulla	Tikiri Banda Tennekoon	Hand	10,792
34 Laggala	K.M.K. Banda	Hand	3,073
35 Matale	B.H. Aluvihare	Elephant	8,022
36 Rattota	Chandrasena Munaweera	Hand	6,198

==== Kandy District ====
Electorate	Elected Member	Symbol	Votes
37 Wattegma	P. B. A. Weerakoon	Hand	8,680
38 Akurana	D. H. Jayawickrema	Umbrella	15,856
39 Galagedara	C. A. S. Marikkar	Hand	4,493
40 Yatinuwara	S. S. Abeysundera	Elephant	4,352
41 Udunuwara	T.B. Jayasundera	Hand	7,650
42 Kandy	E. L. Senanayake	Elephant	6,924
43 Senkadagala	N. Wimalasena	Elephant	5,831
44 Kundasale	U. P. Y. Jinadasa	Hand	7,121
45 Teldeniya	Tissa Kapukotuwa	Elephant	3,726
46 Minipe	R. W. Tennekoon	Elephant	3,868
49 Hewaheta	T.B. Illangaratne	Hand	5,570
50 Gampola	R.R.D. Bandaranayake	Hand	5,911
51 Nawalapitiya	R.S. Pelpola	Hand	7,200

==== Nuwaraeliya District ====
Electorate	Elected Member	Symbol	Votes
47 Walapane	T.B.M. Herath	Hand	5,727
48 Hanguranketha	M.D. Banda	Elephant	7,119
53 Nuwara Eliya	T. William Fernando	Hand	2,397
54 Maskeliya	Donald J. Ranaweera	Elephant	4,192
52 Kotmale	J.D.Weerasekera	Umbrella	4,643

=== Southern Province ===
==== Galle District ====
Electorate	Elected Member	Symbol	Votes
55 Balapitiya	Lakshman de Silva	Hand	8,465
56 Ambalangoda	William de Silva	Cart Wheel	8,716
57 Bentara-Elpitiya	R. G. Samaranayake	Elephant	7,769
58 Hiniduma	M. S. Amarasiri	Cart Wheel	4,173
59 Baddegama	Neal de Alwis	Key	4,871
60 Ratgama	M. P. de Zoysa	Hand	7,700
61 Akmeemana	Senapala Samarasekera	Umbrella	11,815
62 Galle	W. D. S. Abeygoonawardena	Elephant	10,480
63 Habaraduwa	Prins Gunasekera	Cart Wheel	7,217

==== Matara District ====
Electorate	Elected Member	Symbol	Votes
64 Weligama	Montague Jayawickrema	Elephant	14,270
65 Akuressa	S. A. Wickremasinghe	Star	13,191
66 Deniyaya	P. L. Jinadasa	Elephant	6,555
67 Hakmana	Don Roy Rajapaksa	Cart Wheel	9,083
68 Kamburupitiya	Percy Wickremasinghe	Star	9,442
69 Matara	Justin Wijayawardhene	Elephant	8,409
70 Devinuwara	C. A. Dharmapala	Elephant	8,748

==== Hambantota District ====
Electorate	Elected Member	Symbol	Votes
71 Beliatta	D. P. Atapattu	Elephant	14,379
72 Mulkirigala	George Rajapaksa	Cartwheel	13,533
73 Tissamaharama	Lakshman Rajapaksa	Cartwheel	10,665

=== Northern Province ===
==== Jaffna District ====
Electorate	Elected Member	Symbol	Votes
74 Kayts	V. A. Kandiah	House	10,820
75 Vaddukkoddai	A. Amirthalingam	House	11,524
76 Kankesanturai	S.J.V. Chelvanayakam	House	13,545
77 Uduvil	Visuvanathar Tharmalingam	House	9,033
78 Jaffna	A.T. Durayappah	Sun	6,201
79 Nallur	E.M.V. Naganathan	House	9,651
80 Kopai	M.Balasundaram	House	10,279
81 Uduppiddi	M. Sivasithamparam	Bicycle	7,365
82 Point Pedro	K. Thurairatnam	House	5,679
83 Chavakachcheri	V.N. Navaratnam	House	13,907

==== Vanni District ====
Electorate	Elected Member	Symbol	Votes
84 Kilinochchi	A. Sivasunderam	House	3,741
85 Mannar	V.A. Alegacone	House	6,463
86 Vavuniya	T. Sivasithamparam	Sun	5,370

=== Eastern Province ===
==== Trincomalee District ====
Electorate	Elected Member	Symbol	Votes
87 Trincomalee	N.R. Rajavarothiam	House	8,872
88 Mutur T.	Ahambaram	House	10,685

==== Batticaloa District ====
Electorate	Elected Member	Symbol	Votes
89 Kalkudah	P. Manicavasagam	House	7,318
90 Batticaloa	C. Rajadurai	House	28,309
91 Amparai	Wijayabahu Wijayasinha	Hand	4,237
92 Paddiruppu	S.M.Rasamanickam	House	10,799
93 Kalmunai	M.S. Kariapper	Umbrella	5,743
94 Nintavur	M.I.M. Abdul Majeed	Radio Set	10,017
95 Pottuvil	M.A. Abdul Majeed	Cockerel	9,874

=== North Western Province ===
==== Puttalam and Kurunegaka Districts ====
Electorate	Elected Member	Symbol	Votes
96 Puttalam	M.H. Naina Marikkar	Elephant	7,344
97 Nikaweratiya	Mudiyanse Tennekoon	Hand	13,409
98 Yapahuwa	R.B. Tennekoon	Hand	8,536
99 Hiriyala	A.H. Senanayake	Elephant	9,202
100 Wariyapola	A. Adikari	Hand	11,894
101 Bingiriya	L.B. Jayasena	Hand	6,673
102 Chilaw	W.J.C. Munasinghe	Hand	9,302
103 Nattandiya	Albert F. Peries	Elephant	10,914
104 Wennappuwa	Hugh Fernando	Hand	11,043
105 Katugampola	T.B. Subasinghe	Mortar	8,766
106 Kuliyapitiya	I.M.R.A. Iriyagolle	Eye	8,257
107 Dambadeniya	R.G. Senanayake	Hand	14,401
108 Polgahawela	Stephen Samarakkody	Hand	6,038
109 Kurunegala	D.B. Monnekulama	Hand	8,176
110 Mawatagama	E.M.R.B.Ekanayake	Elephant	6,877
111 Dodangaslanda	A.U. Romanis	Elephant	7,571

=== North Central Province ===
==== Anuradapura District ====
Electorate	Elected Member	Symbol	Votes
112 Anuradhapura	Sirimewan Godage	Hand	5,922
113 Medawachchiya	Maithripala Senanayake	Hand	9,475
114 Horowupotana	E.L.B. Hurulle	Elephant	5,120
115 Mihintale	P.M.K. Tennakoon	Key	2,581
116 Kalawewa	R.B. Ratnamalala	Hand	7,455
117 Kekirawa	S.B. Lenawa	Hand	4,590

==== Polonnaruwa District ====
Electorate	Elected Member	Symbol	Votes
118 Minneriya	C.P. de Silva	Hand	9,770
119 Polonnaruwa	A.H. de Silva	Hand	7,107

=== Uva Province ===
==== Badulla District ====
Electorate	Elected Member	Symbol	Votes
120 Mahiyangane	C. P. J. Seneviratne	Elephant	3,164
122 Passara	S. A. Peeris	Elephant	3,286
123 Badulla	B. H. Bandara	Hand	4,775
124 Soranatota	K. Y. M WijeratneBanda	Hand	3,821
125 Uva Paranagama	Kusuma Rajaratne	Aeroplane	4,662
126 Welimada	K. M. P. Rajaratne	Aeroplane	6,539
127 Bandarawela	J. G. Gunasekera	Hand	5,603
128 Haputale	W. P. G. Ariyadasa	Hand	3,655

==== Monaragala District ====
Electorate	Elected Member	Symbol	Votes
129 Monaragala	W.G.M. Albert Silva	Hand	3,738
121 Bibile R.M.	Gunasekera	Elephant	3,361

=== Sabaragamuwa Province ===
==== Kegalle District ====
Electorate	Elected Member	Symbol	Votes
130 Dedigama	Dudley Senanayake	Elephant	12,208
131 Galigamuwa	Wimala Kannangara	Elephant	9,025
132 Kegalle	P. B. G. Kalugalle	Hand	10,572
133 Rambukkana	N. H. A. M. Karunaratne	Hand	11,938
134 Mawanella	P. B. Bandaranayake	Elephant	7,238
135 Yatiyantota	N. M. Perera	Key	10,432
136 Ruwanwella	H. G. Somabandu	Key	9,883
137 Dehiowita	Soma Wickremanayake	Key	6,606

==== Ratnapura District ====
Electorate	Elected Member	Symbol	Votes
138 Kiriella	A. E. B. Kiriella	Elephant	6,816
139 Ratnapura	H. Weragama	Elephant	7,434
140 Pelmadulla	W. A. Karunasena	Hand	4,535
141 Balangoda	C. S. Ratwatte	Hand	9,494
142 Rakwana	V. T. G. Karunaratne	Hand	4,766
143 Nivitigala	D. F. Hettiarachchi	Cart Wheel	7,314
144 Kalawana	Abeyratne Pilapitiya	Sun	3,291
145 Kolonna	Cyril Mathew	Elephant	3,420
