= 1977 Sri Lankan parliamentary election =

- 21 July 1977

All 168 seats in the National State Assembly 85 seats were needed for a majority
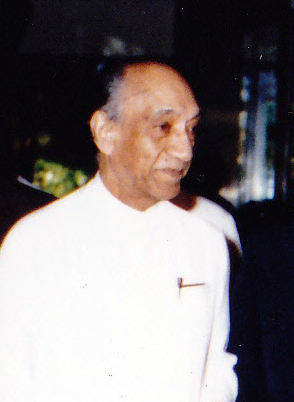

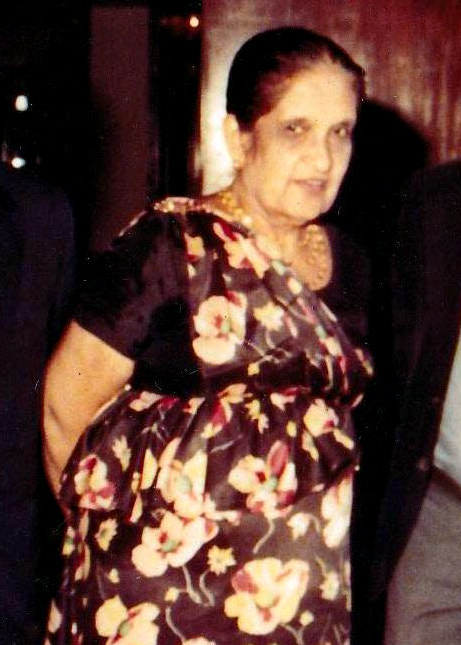
	First party	Second party	Third party
Leader	J. R. Jayewardene	A. Amirthalingam	Sirimavo Bandaranaike
Party	UNP	TULF	SLFP
Leader since	1973	1977	1960
Leader's seat	Colombo West	Kankesanthurai	Attanagalla
Last election	37.91%, 17 seats	Did not exist	36.86%, 91 seats
Seats won	140	18	8
Seat change	▲123	New party	▼83
Popular vote	3,179,221	421,488	1,855,331
Percentage	50.92%	6.75%	29.72%
Swing	▲13.01pp	New party	▼7.14pp
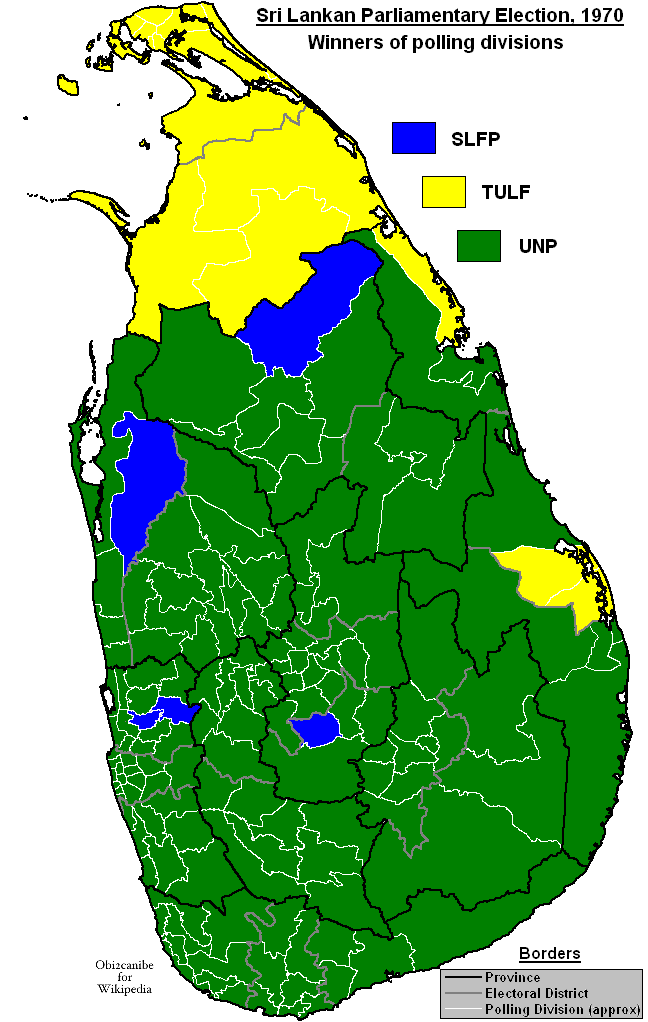
- Winners of polling divisions. UNP in green, TULF in yellow and SLFP in blue.
Prime Minister before election
Sirimavo Bandaranaike
SLFP
Prime Minister-designate
Junius Richard Jayewardene
UNP

Parliamentary elections were held in Sri Lanka on 21 July 1977. The result was a landslide victory for the United National Party, which won 140 of the 168 seats in the National State Assembly.

== Background ==
Prime Minister Sirimavo Bandaranaike had become extraordinarily unpopular. Her economic policies had led to industrial growth and self-reliance, but were insufficient to overcome unemployment. Constitutionally, she had taken advantage of the 1972 constitution to delay the election until 1977, instead of 1975 as would have been the case under the old Soulbury constitution. The government's strong Sinhala nationalist stance had led to unrest in the Tamil north; in response, an island-wide state of emergency was imposed, causing hardship to many people. The UF coalition Bandaranaike had built for the 1970 elections had disintegrated.

By contrast, the United National Party had made a surprising comeback since its 1970 humiliation. Under the leadership of J.R. Jayewardene it had assiduously built up its ground organization. The UNP promised to solve the ethnic problem with a devolution package. Economically, it proposed opening up the Sri Lankan economy again. Constitutionally, the UNP called for replacing the Westminster-based political system with one modelled along French lines. Most importantly, it promised a free extra ration of eight pounds of cereal (the so-called eta ata), on top of the existing ration of two kilograms of rice.

More portentous was the status of the Tamil parties. The old federalist Tamil parties had merged to form the Tamil United Liberation Front, led by Appapillai Amirthalingam, which had gone beyond regional autonomy to openly call for independence of the Tamil-speaking regions of the country.

== Results ==
The UNP won the largest landslide in Sri Lankan history, taking over half the vote and 140 of the 168 seats, five-sixths of the legislature. The size of the landslide was magnified by the first-past-the-post system. The SLFP was decimated, falling from 91 seats to only eight–easily the worst defeat that a Sri Lankan ruling party has ever suffered, and one of the worst ever suffered by a governing party in a Westminster system.

For the first time, a Tamil party won the second-highest number of seats in Parliament and became the Official Opposition.

Abeyratne Pilapitiya of the UNP was elected MP for Kalawana, but was subsequently unseated in an election petition. Sarath Muttetuwegama of the Communist Party was returned to Parliament in the ensuing by-election.

The 1977 election was the only one held in Sri Lanka under the 1972 constitution. A year later, the UNP-dominated legislature amended the constitution to replace the parliamentary system with a presidential system. Under the provisions of the new document, Prime Minister Jayewardene became president on 4 February 1978.

Party	Votes	%	Seats
United National Party	3,179,221	50.92	140
Sri Lanka Freedom Party	1,855,331	29.72	8
Tamil United Liberation Front	421,488	6.75	18
Lanka Sama Samaja Party	225,317	3.61	0
Communist Party of Sri Lanka	123,856	1.98	0
Ceylon Workers' Congress	62,707	1.00	1
Mahajana Eksath Peramuna	22,639	0.36	0
Independents	353,014	5.65	1
Total	6,243,573	100.00	168
Registered voters/turnout	6,667,589	–	
Source: Kusaka Research Institute

== Results by electorate ==
=== Western Province ===
==== Colombo District ====
Electorate	Name of the Elected	Symbol
Colombo North	M. Vincent Perera	Elephant
Colombo Central	R.Premadasa	Elephant
Colombo Central	M.Jabir A. Cader	Eye
Colombo Central	M.Haleem Ishak	Hand
Borella	M.H.Mohomed	Elephant
Colombo East	A.Edmund Samarawickrema	Elephant
Colombo West	J.R.Jayewardene	Elephant
Dehiwala	S. de S. Jayasinghe	Elephant
Ratmalana	Lalith Athulathmudali	Elephant
Kolonnawa	Weerasinghe Mallimarachchi	Elephant
Kotte	Anandatissa de Alwis	Elephant
Kaduwela	M.D.H. Jayawardana	Elephant
Awissawella	M.D.Premarathna	Elephant
Homagama	Gamini Jayasuriya	Elephant
Maharagama	Premaratne Gunasekera	Elephant
Kesbewa	Dharmasena Attygalle	Elephant
Moratuwa	Tyronne Fernando	Elephant

==== Gampaha District ====
Electorate	Name of the Elected	Symbol
Wattala	D. Shelton Jayasinghe	Elephant
Negambo	N. Denzil Fernando	Elephant
Katana	Wijayapala Mendis	Elephant
Divulapitiya	Ariyaratne Jayatillake	Elephant
Mirigama	Mahendra Wijeratne	Elephant
Minuwangoda	Bennet Gunasekera	Elephant
Attanagalla	Sirimavo Bandaranaike	Hand
Gampaha	S. D. Bandaranayake	Hand
Ja-ela	Joseph Michael Perera	Elephant
Mahara	Tudor Gunasekara	Elephant
Dompe	Sarathchandra Rajakaruna	Elephant
Biyagama	Ranil Wickremasinghe	Elephant
Kelaniya	Kaluwadewage Cyril Mathew	Elephant

==== Kalutara District ====
Electorate	Name of the Elected	Symbol
Panadura	Neville Fernando	Elephant
Bandaragama	Senaraja Samaranayake	Elephant
Horana	Indradasa Hettiarachchi	Elephant
Bulathsinhala	O.S. Perera	Elephant
Mathugama	Reginold V. Wijegooneratne	Elephant
Kalutara	V.L.Wijemanne	Elephant
Beruwala	Abdul Bakeer Markar	Elephant
Beruwala	R. G. Samaranayake	Hand
Agalawatta	Merill Kariyawasam	Elephant

=== Central Province ===
==== Matale District ====
Electorate	Name of the Elected	Symbol
Dambulla	K.W.R.M.Ekananayake	Elephant
Laggala	J.G.Wijeratne Banda	Elephant
Matale	Alick Aluvihare	Elephant
Rattota	P.B.Kaviratne	Elephant

==== Kandy District ====
Electorate	Name of the Elected	Symbol
Galagedara	W.M.G.T. Banda	Elephant
Harispattuwa	Abdul Cader Shahul Hameed	Elephant
Harispattuwa	R. Premachandra Wijesiri	Umbrella
Pathadumbara	T. B. Werapitiya	Elephant
Udadumbara	R.B. Attanayake	Elephant
Teldeniya	Gamini Rajapakse	Elephant
Kundasale	D.M. Chandrapala	Elephant
Hewaheta	Anura Daniel	Elephant
Senkadagala	Shelton Ranaraja	Elephant
Mahanuwara	E.L. Senanayake	Elephant
Yatinuwara	Sunil Subasiri Abeysundara	Elephant
Udunuwara	D.B. Wijetunga	Elephant
Gampola	W.P.B. Dissanayake	Elephant

==== Nuwaraeliya District ====
Electorate	Name of the Elected	Symbol
Navalapitiya	Chandradra Karunaratne	Elephant
Nuwaraeliya Maskeliya	Gamini Dissanayake	Elephant
Nuwaraeliya Maskeliya	Anura Bandaranaike	Hand
Nuwaraeliya Maskeliya	S. Thondaman	Cockerel
Kothmale	Ananda Dassanayake	Hand
Hanguranketha	George Abeygoonasekera	Elephant
Walapane	Renuka Herath (Mrs.)	Elephant

=== Southern Province ===
==== Galle District ====
Electorate	Name of the Elected	Symbol
Balapitiya	Norman Waidyaratna	Elephant
Ambalangoda	Raitor Thilakasekara	Elephant
Karandeniya	Bandulahewa Senadheera	Elephant
Bentara-Elpitiya	Rupasena Karunatilake	Elephant
Hiniduma	M.S. Amarasiri	Elephant
Baddegama	E.D. Wickrematilaka	Elephant
Rathgma	Edwin Thilakaratne	Elephant
Galle	Albert de Silva	Elephant
Akmeemana	Sumanadasa Abeywickrama	Elephant
Habaraduwa	P. Sumathiratne	Elephant

==== Matara District ====
Electorate	Name of the Elected	Symbol
Deniyaya	Keerthisena Abeywickrama	Elephant
Hakmana	Harshanath Wanigasekara	Elephant
Akuressa	Dayananda Wickremasinghe	Elephant
Kamburupitiya	D.E. Malawaraarachchi	Elephant
Devinuwara	Ronnie de Mel	Elephant
Matara	S.K. Piyadasa	Elephant
Weligama	Montague Jayawickrema	Elephant

==== Hambantota District ====
Electorate	Name of the Elected	Symbol
Mulkirigala	T.D.Fransisku	Elephant
Beliatta	Ranjith Atapattu	Elephant
Tangalle	Jinadasa Weerasinghe	Elephant
Tissamaharama	P.M.B. Cyril	Elephant

=== Northern Province ===
==== Jaffna District ====
Electorate	Name of the Elected	Symbol
Kayts	K.P. Ratnam	Sun
Vaddukkodai	T. Thirunavukarasu	Sun
Kankesanthurai	A. Amirthalingam	Sun
Manipay	V. Dharmalingam	Sun
Kopai	S. Kathiravelupillai	Sun
Udduppidi	T. Rasalingam	Sun
Point-Pedro	K. Thurairatnam	Sun
Chavakachcheri	V.N. Navaratnam	Sun
Nallur	M. Sivasithamparam	Sun
Jaffna	V. Yogeswaran	Sun

==== Vanni District ====
Electorate	Name of the Elected	Symbol
Kilinochchi	V. Anandasangary	Sun
Mannar	P.S. Soosaithasan	Sun
Mulativu	X.M.Sellathambu	Sun
Vavuniya	T. Sivasithamparam	Sun

=== Eastern Province ===
==== Trincomalee District ====
Electorate	Name of the Elected	Symbol
Seruvila	H.D.L. Leelaratne	Elephant
Mutur	M.E.H. Maharoof	Elephant
Trincomalee	R. Sampathan	Sun

==== Batticalao District ====
Electorate	Name of the Elected	Symbol
Kalkudah	K.W. Devanayagam	Elephant
Batticaloa	C.Rajadurai & Farid Meeralebbai	Sun/Elephant
Paddiruppu	P. Ganeshalingam	Sun

==== Ampara District ====
Electorate	Name of the Elected	Symbol
Ampara	P. Dayaratna	Elephant
Sammanthurai	M. A. Abdul Majeed	Elephant
Kalmunai	Abdul Rasak Mansoor	Elephant
Potuvil	M.A.M. Jalaldeen & C.Kanagaratnam	Elephant/Sun

=== North Western Province ===
==== Puttalam District ====
Electorate	Name of the Elected	Symbol
Puttalam	M.H.M. Neina Marikkar	Elephant
Anamaduwa	Saddhatissa Wadigamangawa	Hand
Chilaw	Harindra Corea	Elephant
Nattandiya	Harold Herath	Elephant
Wennappuwa	Festus Perera	Elephant

==== Kurunegala District ====
Electorate	Name of the Elected	Symbol
Galgamuwa	H.M.A. Lokubanda	Elephant
Nikaweratiya	H.B. Wanninayake	Elephant
Yapahuwa	H.B. Abeyratne	Elephant
Hiriyala	S.B. Herath	Elephant
Wariyapola	Amara Piyaseeli Ratnayake	Elephant
Panduwasnuwara	Kalubanda Ratnayake	Elephant
Bingiriya	J.L. Sirisena	Elephant
Katugampola	Gamini Jayawickrama Perera	Elephant
Kuliyapitiya	Lionel Jayatillake	Elephant
Dambadeniya	Ukkubanda Wijekoon	Elephant
Polgahawela	J.A.D.S. R. Jayakody	Elephant
Kurunegala	Dingiri Banda Welagedera	Elephant
Mawathagama	G.M. Premachandra	Elephant
Dodangaslanda	S.W. Alawatuwala	Elephant

=== North Central Province ===
==== Anuradapura District ====
Electorate	Name of the Elected	Symbol
Medawachchiya	Maithripala Senanayake	Hand
Horoupothana	E.L.B.Hurulle	Elephant
Anuradhapura East	W.Y. Herath	Elephant
Anuradhapura West	K.D.M.C. Bandara	Elephant
Kalawewa	A.M.S. Adikari	Elephant
Mihintale	Dayaratne Walagambahu	Elephant
Kekirawa	G.D. Mahindsoma	Elephant

==== Polonnaruwa District ====
Electorate	Name of the Elected	Symbol
Minneriya	Merril de Silva	Elephant
Medirigiriya	A.D.B. Ekanayake	Elephant
Polonnaruwa	H.G.P. Nelson	

=== Uva Province ===
==== Badulla District ====
Electorate	Name of the Elected	Symbol
Mahiyangana	C.P.J.Seneviratne	Elephant
Viyaluwa	Weerawanni Samaraweera	Elephant
Passara	W.M. Karunaratne	Elephant
Badulla	D. Vincent Dias	Elephant
Hali-ela	R.M. Abeykoon	Elephant
Uva-paranagama	R.M. Karunaratne	Elephant
Welimada	Percy Samaraweera	Elephant
Bandarawela	R.M.Apphamy	Elephant
Haputale	W.J.M.Lokubandara	Elephant

==== Monaragala District ====
Electorate	Name of the Elected	Symbol
Bibile	R.M.Dharmadasa Banda	Elephant
Moneragala	R.M. Punchi Bandara	Elephant
Wellawaya	J.M. Kumaradasa	Elephant

=== Sabaragamuwa Province ===
==== Kegalle District ====
Electorate	Name of the Elected	Symbol
Dedigama	Nissanka Parakrama Wijayaratne	Elephant
Galigamuwa	Wimala Kannangara (Mrs.)	Elephant
Kegalle	N.A. Seneviratne	Elephant
Rambukkana	Asoka Karunaratne	Elephant
Mawanella	C.R. Beligammana	Elephant
Aranayaka	Wasantha Udayaratne	Elephant
Yatiyantota	K. Vincent Perera	Elephant
Ruwanwella	P.C. Imbulana	Elephant
Deraniyagala	A.K.D. Wanigaratne	Elephant

==== Ratnapura District ====
Electorate	Name of the Elected	Symbol
Ehaliyagoda	Mervyn Kularatne	Elephant
Ratnapura	G.V. Punchinilame	Elephant
Pelmadulla	Chandrasekera Gankanda	Elephant
Balangoda	M.L.M.Aboosally	Elephant
Rakwana	H. Kularatne	Elephant
Nivitigala	Gamini Athukorale	Elephant
Kalawana	Abeyratna Pilapitiya	Elephant
Kolonna	Caluwadewage Nanda Mathew	Elephant

== Violence ==
Post-poll violence killed 34 people between 22 and 25 July 1977.
