= Elections in Sri Lanka =

Sri Lanka, pursuant to the provisions of its constitution, elects an executive president as head of state and members of its national unicameral legislature, the Parliament at a national level; as well as other provincial and local government representatives in a periodic manner. The country has a multi-party political system. Elections are organised and overseen by the Election Commission of Sri Lanka.

== The Executive President ==
The President of Sri Lanka is directly elected for a five-year term, through a version of Instant-runoff voting in which electors rank up to three candidates, and limited to only two rounds in total. If no candidate wins a majority in the first round of voting, second and third preferences from ballots whose first preference candidate has been eliminated are used to determine the winner. However, there has been no instance where a "run-off" count was needed since the introduction of the executive presidency in the 1980s until the 2024 Sri Lankan presidential election. No candidate reached 50% of the votes or more in the first count of the 2024 Presidential Election, which subsequently led to a second count being performed.

== Parliament ==
The Parliament of Sri Lanka has 225 members, elected for a five-year term, 196 members elected in multi-seat constituencies through proportional representation system where each party is allocated a number of seats from the quota for each district according to the proportion of the total vote that party obtains in the district. The remaining 29 MPs are appointed by each party secretary according to the island wide proportional vote the party obtains, a procedure referred to as the "National List".

== Local Government ==
The Local government bodies in Sri Lanka;

- Municipal Councils
- Urban Councils
- Pradeshiya Sabha

are elected through the mixed electoral system.

== Latest elections ==
=== 2024 presidential election ===
Candidate	Party	First preference		Total votes	
Candidate	Party	Votes	%	Votes	%
Anura Kumara Dissanayake	National People's Power	5,634,915	42.31	5,740,179	55.89
Sajith Premadasa	Samagi Jana Balawegaya	4,363,035	32.76	4,530,902	44.11
Ranil Wickremesinghe	Independent	2,299,767	17.27		
Namal Rajapaksa	Sri Lanka Podujana Peramuna	342,781	2.57		
P. Ariyanethiran	Independent	226,343	1.70		
Dilith Jayaweera	Communist Party of Sri Lanka	122,396	0.92		
K. K. Piyadasa	Independent	47,543	0.36		
D. M. Bandaranayake	Independent	30,660	0.23		
Sarath Fonseka	Independent	22,407	0.17		
Wijeyadasa Rajapakshe	National Democratic Front	21,306	0.16		
Anuruddha Polgampola	Independent	15,411	0.12		
Sarath Keerthirathne	Independent	15,187	0.11		
K. R. Krishan	Arunalu People's Front	13,595	0.10		
Suranjeewa Anoj de Silva	Democratic United National Front	12,898	0.10		
Priyantha Wickremesinghe	Nava Sama Samaja Party	12,760	0.10		
Namal Rajapaksha	Samabima Party	12,700	0.10		
Akmeemana Dayarathana Thero	Independent	11,536	0.09		
Nuwan Bopege	Socialist People's Forum	11,191	0.08		
Ajantha de Zoyza	Ruhunu People's Party	10,548	0.08		
Victor Anthony Perera	Independent	10,374	0.08		
Siripala Amarasinghe	Independent	9,035	0.07		
Siritunga Jayasuriya	United Socialist Party (Sri Lanka)	8,954	0.07		
Battaramulle Seelarathana Thero	People's Welfare Front	6,839	0.05		
Abubakar Mohamed Infaz	Democratic Unity Alliance	6,531	0.05		
Pemasiri Manage	Independent	5,822	0.04		
Mahinda Dewage	Socialist Party of Sri Lanka	5,338	0.04		
Keerthi Wickremeratne	Our People's Power Party	4,676	0.04		
Pani Wijesiriwardena	Socialist Equality Party (Sri Lanka)	4,410	0.03		
Oshala Herath	New Independent Front	4,253	0.03		
Roshan Ranasinghe	Independent	4,205	0.03		
P. W. S. K. Bandaranayake	National Development Front	4,070	0.03		
Ananda Kularatne	Independent	4,013	0.03		
Lalith de Silva	United National Freedom Front	3,004	0.02		
Sidney Jayarathna	Independent	2,799	0.02		
Janaka Ratnayake	United Lanka People's Party	2,405	0.02		
M. Thilakarajah	Independent	2,138	0.02		
Sarath Manamendra	New Sinhala Heritage	1,911	0.01		
A. S. P. Liyanage	Sri Lanka Labour Party	1,860	0.01		
Total		13,319,616	100.00	10,271,081	100.00

=== 2024 parliamentary election ===
Party	Votes	%	Seats		
Party	Votes	%	District	National	Total
National People's Power	6,863,186	61.56	141	18	159
Samagi Jana Balawegaya	1,968,716	17.66	35	5	40
New Democratic Front (Sri Lanka)	500,835	4.49	3	2	5
Sri Lanka Podujana Peramuna	350,429	3.14	2	1	3
Ilankai Tamil Arasu Kachchi	257,813	2.31	7	1	8
Sarvajana Balaya	178,006	1.60	0	1	1
Sri Lanka Muslim Congress	87,038	0.78	2	1	3
United Democratic Voice	83,488	0.75	0	0	0
United National Party	66,234	0.59	1	0	1
Democratic Tamil National Alliance	65,382	0.59	1	0	1
Democratic Left Front (Sri Lanka)	50,836	0.46	0	0	0
Democratic National Alliance (Sri Lanka)	45,419	0.41	0	0	0
Tamil National People's Front	39,894	0.36	1	0	1
Tamil Makkal Viduthalai Pulikal	34,440	0.31	0	0	0
All Ceylon Makkal Congress	33,911	0.30	1	0	1
People's Struggle Alliance	29,611	0.27	0	0	0
Eelam People's Democratic Party	28,985	0.26	0	0	0
Jaffna – Independent Group 17	30,637	0.27	1	0	1
National Democratic Front (Sri Lanka)	25,444	0.23	0	0	0
United National Alliance	22,548	0.20	0	0	0
Sri Lanka Labour Party	17,710	0.16	1	0	1
Devana Parapura	16,950	0.15	0	0	0
Tamil People's Alliance	13,295	0.12	0	0	0
Jana Setha Peramuna	12,743	0.11	0	0	0
National Front for Good Governance	8,447	0.08	0	0	0
United National Freedom Front	7,796	0.07	0	0	0
Arunalu Peoples Alliance	7,666	0.07	0	0	0
New Independent Front	7,182	0.06	0	0	0
National People's Party (Sri Lanka)	6,307	0.06	0	0	0
Our Power of People's Party	6,043	0.05	0	0	0
Tamil United Liberation Front	5,061	0.05	0	0	0
Democratic United National Front	4,480	0.04	0	0	0
Samabima Party	4,449	0.04	0	0	0
Patriotic People's Power	3,985	0.04	0	0	0
Eros Democratic Front	2,865	0.03	0	0	0
Democratic Unity Alliance	2,198	0.02	0	0	0
Socialist Party of Sri Lanka	2,087	0.02	0	0	0
Jathika Sangwardhena Peramuna	1,920	0.02	0	0	0
United Socialist Party (Sri Lanka)	1,838	0.02	0	0	0
Socialist Equality Party (Sri Lanka)	864	0.01	0	0	0
Freedom People's Front	841	0.01	0	0	0
United Peace Alliance	822	0.01	0	0	0
Lanka Janatha Party	759	0.01	0	0	0
Eksath Lanka Podujana Pakshaya	659	0.01	0	0	0
Liberal Democratic Party (Sri Lanka)	635	0.01	0	0	0
New Lanka Freedom Party	601	0.01	0	0	0
Nava Sama Samaja Party	491	0.00	0	0	0
Akhila Ilankai Tamil Mahasabha	450	0.00	0	0	0
Democratic Party (Sri Lanka)	283	0.00	0	0	0
Sri Lanka Mahajana Pakshaya	269	0.00	0	0	0
Independents	245,458	2.20	0	0	0
Total	11,148,006	100.00	196	29	225

== See also ==
- Electoral calendar
- Electoral system
