= Kavantissa (elephant) =

Sri Lankan wild tusker elephant (died 2026)

Kawanthissa
- Kavantissa crossing the main road
- Species: Sri Lankan elephant (Elephas maximus maximus)
- Sex: Male
- Born: 1966–1981; Galgamuwa, Kurunegala
- Died: 16 October 2026 (aged 45-60); Siyambalangamuwa, Kurunegala
- Cause of death: Infected gunshot wound
- Residence: Galgamuwa forest range, Kurunegala
- Weight: 5,400 kg (11,905 lb; 850 st 5 lb)
- Height: 11.2 ft (3.4 m)
- Named after: Kavan Tissa, Prince of Ruhuna

Kavantissa, also spelled as Kawanthissa, (Sinhala: කාවන්තිස්ස), also known as the Gentle Giant of Galgamuwa (Sinhala: ගල්ගමුවේ මහ ඇතා), (c. 1966-1981 – 16 October 2026) was a Sri Lankan elephant that was known for his long tusks and great size, being the tallest and largest living elephant in Sri Lanka. Kavantissa gained notoriety for his daily commute across the main road in the area. Locals and tourists alike came to witness this crossing. His tusk had a length of 2.5 m (8 ft 2 in) and was named after King Kawan Tissa.

== Background and behaviour ==
Kawanthissa was first identified in 2008 and was named in 2015 by wildlife experts. He was named Kawanthissa because of his docile nature and to represent the royal status he had in the forest. He roamed the Galgamuwa, Meegalewa, Siyambalangamuwa and Kahalla-Pallekele Sanctuary range and was considered the tallest and largest wild tusker in Sri Lanka.

He was most famous for his unique behaviour at the Gatadivula–Kasikote elephant crossing on the Anuradhapura–Colombo main road. His daily movement required him to cross the busy road to move between forest patches. A local resident, Chaminda Kumara, known as "Kumara Uncle", would step onto the road and stop traffic to allow Kawanthissa and his herd to cross safely. After crossing, Kawanthissa would lift his trunk toward Kumara and the crowd, a gesture known locally as his "Wave of Gratitude" or "The Kasikote Salute". Villagers gathered every evening at Kasikote to witness this ritual. According to villagers in Galgamuwa, Kawanthissa never harmed anyone in the village nor caused significant damage to crops, despite regularly moving through human settlements.

Because of this gentle temperament and accessibility, Kawanthissa became a major wildlife tourism attraction in the North Western Province. Local safari operators offered dedicated tracking tours and photographers waited for days near Siyambalangamuwa tank. He was marketed as the "Gentle Giant of Galgamuwa".

== Death ==
On 20 September 2026, Kawanthissa was discovered with a gunshot wound to his front right leg. Four days later, a team of wildlife veterinary surgeons was dispatched to Galgamuwa to treat Kawanthissa. Due to the delay of the treatment, the wound became infected, limiting his ability to walk and to put weight on to his injured leg. Kawanthissa was sedated, allowing the veterinary team to clean the wound and administer antibiotics. Initially, the Ministry of Environment reported that there was signs the elephant was recovering.

Due to his injury, Kawanthissa became aggressive toward humans and his movement through Galgamuwa became slow.

On 12 October, Kawanthissa was moved to Thambuttegama and was suffering from severe diarrhea and was given treatment for his illness and his gunshot wound.

On 16 October, Kawanthissa was found collapsed near a paddy field in Siyambalangamuwa, a few kilometers away from the site where he originally received treatment. Wildlife officials launched an emergency operation to try to save him, requesting further medical assistance from Thailand. Despite their efforts, Kawanthissa passed away at 6:18 pm.

== Aftermath and impact ==
The shooting of the Kawanthissa elephant is currently under investigation by the Criminal Investigation Department.

On 18 October wildlife officials and Walana anti-corruption unit has arrested a suspect linked to the shooting of Kawanthissa in Meegalewa area, in the suspect’s position a 12-bore firearm, muzzleloader and 24 shells has been discovered, the suspect is a employee under Ehetuwewa Divisional Secretariat.

Further investigation revealed that the suspect was involved in the shooting of Kawanthissa.

A national elephant conservation program was held at the presidential secretariat on 21 October to investigate the death of Kawanthissa and to develop an effective procedure for the welfare and conservation of wild elephants.

Developing of a Rapid Response Veterinary Unit and an emergency science-based procedure was also discussed in the meeting.

== See also ==
- Nadungamuwa Raja
- Raja (elephant)
- Heiyantuduwa Raja
- Millangoda Raja
