= Kataragama Wasana =

Holy Tusker of Kataragama Devalaya

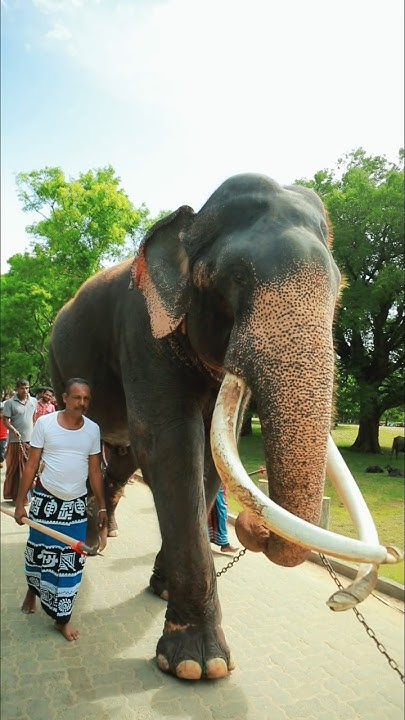
- Wasana tusker with mahout Ajith

Main casket bearer of the procession of Grand Randoli Esala Perahara
- Held title 2025 – To date
- Preceded by: Indi Raja

Personal details
- Born: c. 1970 Anuradhapura District, Sri Lanka
- Height: 10 ft (3.0 m)
- Known for: Casket bearer
- Species: Sri Lankan elephant (Elephas maximus maximus)
- Sex: Male
- Owner: Kataragama Temple

Kataragama Wasana (Sinhala: කතරගම වාසනා), commonly known as Wasana, (formerly known as Kataragama Raja) is a Sri Lankan tusker elephant that belongs to the Kataragama Temple in Kataragama, Sri Lanka. Wasana participates at the annual Esala processions in Sri Lanka and is the sacred casket bearer of the final Randoli perehera of Kandy Esala Perahera and also in many other processions in the country.

Around in 1970, Wasana was born in the wild in the jungles of Anuradhapura where it was initially found and later taken to the Pinnawala Elephant Orphanage. When the elephant was about six years old, the late minister Wimala Kannangara donated him to the Kataragama Devalaya. His original name was Raja, which was later changed to Wasana, a name associated with wealth and blessings. With a height of 10 feet (3.0 m), Wasana is currently the tallest tamed elephant in Sri Lanka.

Wasana is admired by both visitors and devotees for his magnificent tusks, and other regal elephant characheteristics known as 'Maha Gaja Lakshana'. His disciplined demeanor and regal appearance make him a highlight of the spiritual events such as annual Esala Processions, drawing large crowds to witness his presence.

== See also ==
- Raja (elephant)
- Nadungamuwa Raja
- List of individual elephants

== External link ==
- Wasana Tusker: The Majestic Cultural Icon of Sri Lanka
