= Arafa Muslim Mahavidyalaya Handessa =

Arafa Muslim Maha Vidyala
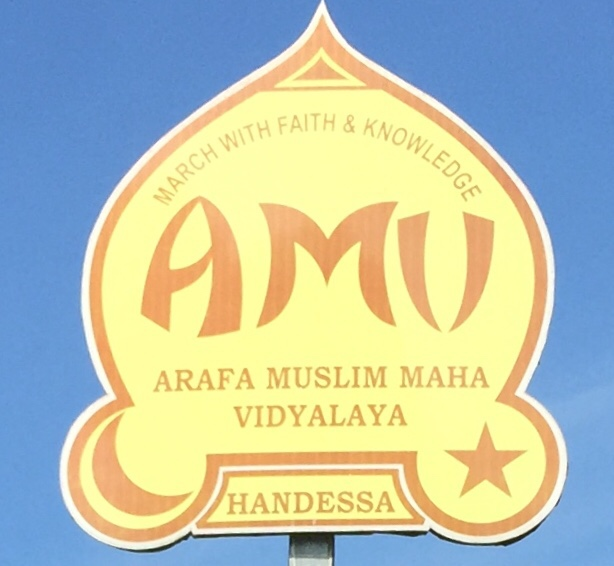

Location
- Handessa; Kandy; Sri Lanka; 7°14′53″N 80°34′14″E E|display=inline,title}}

Information
- Type: Public
- Motto: Arabic: Rabbi Izni Ilmi (march with knowledge & faith)
- Established: 1 September 1966; 60 years ago
- Founder: community leaders, A. H Jainudeen JP H L A Majeed AL Badurdeen U L Haamid Lebbe A L Jainudeen
- Principal: Sajahan
- Staff: 30
- Grades: 1–13 ( Tamil Medium)
- Gender: Boys
- Age: 6 to 19
- Colours: Green, white & maroon
- Alumni: Old Arafans

Arafa Muslim Maha Vidyalaya, commonly called Arafa MMV, (1966 - 2020) is a coeducational school in Udunuwara, under the administration of the Central Province, Sri Lanka in the Kandy District . The school conducts classes from grade 1 to grade 13 in Tamil. In the 2019 General Examination of Advance Level exam, 15 students sat the examination and 13 got admission to the university and one student obtained a university admission entry to the faculty of law.

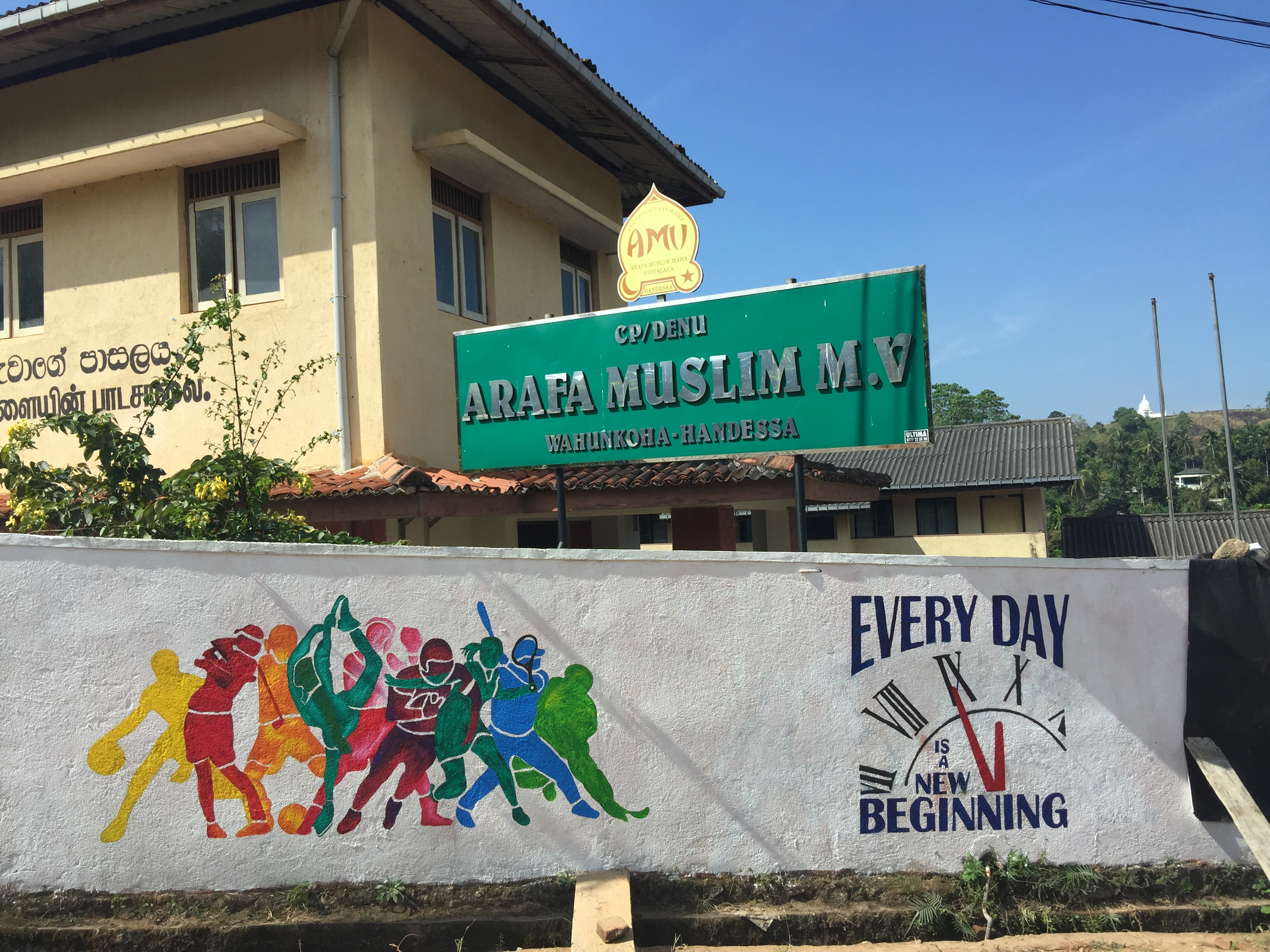
Arafa mmv front view

== History ==
From 1960, a request was made to the education department to establish a primary school by the community leaders led by then school teacher H. L. A. Majeed, which was approved after the intervention of the local member of parliament Dingiri Banda Wijetunga. As customary those days schools were generally established by religious institutions, and this school started in the Wahunkoha Jummah Mosque building, with the 25 students with the first principal Noor Mohammed. He ran the school alone for one month until another three teachers were assigned to the school. In September 1966 another 82 students who were studying at the nearby Alamanar Mahavidyalaya (presently a national school) moved to the school. The school's inauguration ceremony occurred in 1974, under the patronage of Wijetunga.

On 15 August 1968 A. M. Riyal was appointed as new principal, with grade 6 commencing in 1970. The existing building were considered inadequate and the school administration and parents acquiring land, bulgahapitiya watts, from Alan Nugawela, a local philanthropist. In 1971 Sulaiman Lebbe was appointed principal and a request was made through then village council member, H. L. M. Rasheed, to the member for Udunuwara T. B. Jayasundera for funding of Rs 50000/. Building work started in 1972 and the school moved to its present location, with an inauguration conducted by Neal de Alwis, Deputy Minister of Public Administration, Local Government and Home Affairs, along with Jayasundera.

In 1977 a second building was proposed by Wijetunga. In 1979 H. L. A. Majeed was appointed as the new principal and on 29 April 1979 the inauguration of the new school building took place. In the same year an exhibition was held, the student body was divided into houses and a sports meet conducted. On 10 January 1982 the houses were Hira Safa and Mina when Majeed retired and H. M. L. M. Samoon, who was working as a teacher, took over the as principal. of the school when the population of the students were repeatedly increasing there were lack of space again so they took measures to obtain another building as a result they received the 3rd building the inaugural ceremony of the 3rd building took place on 1982.03.13 Wijetunga who was the minister of postal and telecommunications affairs and participated as the chief guest opened the building

Another important incident took place in 1984 it in this year that the students of the schools sat for the ordinary level examinations for the first time 5 students sat for the examination among them four were qualified for the advance level it is on the 18th year of the schools that this incident took place. With this GCE OL examination results of the students population were increasing rapidly in the meantime H. M. L. M. Samoon who was the principal at that time was transferred to another school in 1994 and his successor was J. M. Nizam Welamboda Udunuwara the opening ceremony of the building construction by Hon premadasa through the recommendation of the youth commission formed by him led by professor G L Peries the building consists of a main hall library science lab home science room and the life skill section.

The opening ceremony was conducted by the Wijethunge many shortcomings were fulfilled throughout this building in 1997.01.31 J. M. Nijam was transferred and his successor was S. N. Nizardeen of Galle who was then a resident of Hendeniya. In 1999.02.12 the name of this school was officially changed to as Arafa Muslim Vidyalaya then the principal Nizardeen retired in 2003.06.06 and N. P. M. Awoon from Muruthagahamula was his successor. In 2004 school was granted permission to start advance level and first AL class composed of 07 students and notable thing was female student, Rishama Haris, got best result and entered Peradeniya University and completed BA in arts. In 2006 .06.03 Awoon retired and his successor was A. C. Faleel from Kalugamuwa in 2006. Mr Faleel principal then transferred to another school in 2009.06.13 and his successor was Mrs faizal Umma finally with the recommendation of then provincial council members S. M. M. Marjan under the nanoda project Sarath Ekanayaka then chief minister of central Province allocated Rs 7million as a result of this 02 storied building was constructed and it was declared open on 09.04.2014 by Sarath Ekanayaka chief minister of the Central Province. On that occasion, the guest of honour was S. M. M. Marjan with this class inadequate classes for students were fulfilled. When mrs faizan Umma was principal G C E O/L exam one student got for the first time in the history of the Schools 02 student got 9A followed by 8A 01B too. In 2009.6.13 Faizan Umma principal retired and her successor was Aisha Bee I briefly and Fazly Sulaiman took over the principals post in 2015 and he returned in 2017. His successor is Sajahan who is the current principal.

== Smart Room ==
in 2017 a smart room was planned accordingly old boys and philanthropist helped to prepare a room and installed smart board and projector it's almost 60% completed but teachers are using the facilities to teach students though it has not been fully completed
