= Indi Raja =

Indian elephant

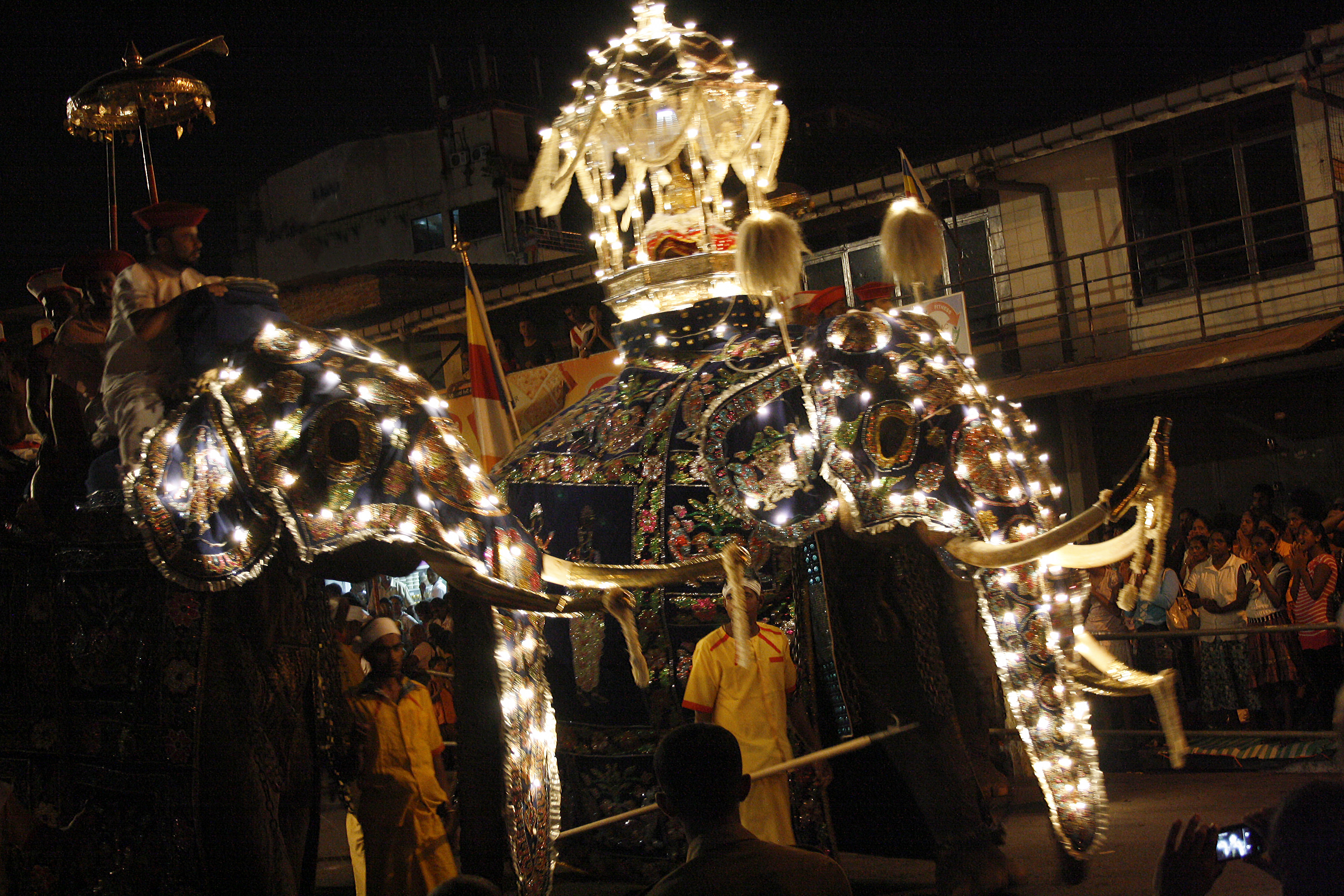
- Indi Raja carrying the main casket

Main casket bearer of the procession of Grand Randoli Esala Perahara
- Held title 2022–2024
- Preceded by: Nadungamuwa Raja
- Succeeded by: Kataragama Wasana

Main casket bearer of the Esala Perahera procession of Kumball Perahara & The First Three Randoli Perahara
- Held title 2009 – To date
- Preceded by: Ruwan Raja & Millangoda Raja

The Leader of the Royal Elephant Ranks of Sri Dalada Maligawa
- In office c. 2000 – To Date

The Royal Elephant Ranks of Sri Dalada Maligawa
- In office c. 1990 – To Date

Personal details
- Born: c. 1980 (age 45–46) India
- Height: 3.15 m (10.3 ft)
- Occupation: Main casket bearer of the procession of Esala
- Known for: Casket bearer
- Species: Indian elephant (Elephas maximus indicus)
- Sex: Male
- Owner: Sri Dalada Maligawa

Indi Raja (c. 1980: Sinhala: ඉන්දි රාජා), also known as Bashir or Indiraja, is an Indian elephant used as a ceremonial tusker in Sri Lanka. Indiraja is a main casket bearer of the Kandy Esala Perahera, an annual religious procession held to pay homage to the Sacred Tooth Relic of Buddha, at the Temple of the Tooth in Kandy, Sri Lanka. He is also the leading tusker of the elephant troop at the Sri Dalada Maligawa in Kandy.

== History ==
The tusker was born around 1980 in India and was gifted to the Temple of the Tooth by Former Prime Minister of India Rajiv Gandhi to then president J. R. Jayewardene at a solemn ceremony on February 2, 1988. Indi Raja was around 6 years when he was gifted to Sri Lanka. In his younger days, Indiraja was docile though playful. He is the second most senior elephant in Dalada Maligawa troop, after Janaraja.

== Perahera procession ==
When there were no suitable tusker elephants to carry the main casket in 2009 with the absence of other tuskers such as Nadungamuwa Raja and Millangoda Loku Raja, Indi Raja got the opportunity to carry the main casket for the first time for 10 days of the Perahera. Thereafter Indi raja carried the casket of the Sacred Tooth Relic in the Esala Perahera when Nadungamuwe Raja was not participating the procession. In 2014, Indiraja was attacked by another elephant on a side at the corner of Kotugodella Street. However, he walked to the Temple of the Tooth carrying the casket without becoming aggressive. In August 2019, the tusker fell ill during the first kumbal Esala perahera.

With the demise of Nadungamuwe Raja in March 2022, Indi Raja became the main casket bearer of Kandy Esala Perahera.

== Rampage ==
In 2004, Indiraja suddenly attacked a mahout, Vijaya. The incident occurred at Vilbawa in the Kurunegala district on the banks of a tank where the elephants had been relaxing before the Perahera of Vilbawe Paththini Devala. The mahout was rushed to the Kurunegala Hospital in critical condition. Later, he was transferred to the Kandy Hospital but died two days without regaining consciousness. After the incident, Indiraja was kept in chains with another Maligawa tusker, Sinharaja. At that time, he broke the chains and charged at Sinharaja and pierced Sinharaja's mouth. Indiraja was sedated for a few days.

== See also ==
- List of individual elephants
