= Assassination of Ranasinghe Premadasa =

1993 murder in Colombo, Sri Lanka

- Part of the Sri Lankan civil war
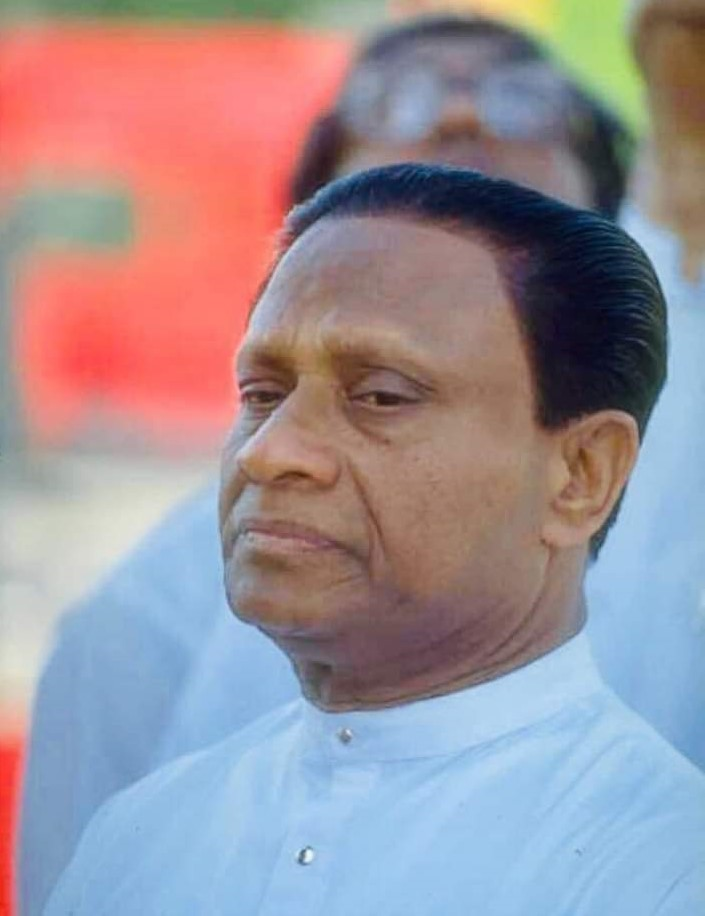
- Premadasa in 1991
- Location: 6°56′31″N 79°51′54″E; Colombo, Sri Lanka
- Date: 1 May 1993; 12:45 PM (SLST)
- Target: Ranasinghe Premadasa
- Attack type: Suicide bombing
- Weapon: 0.91 kg (2 lb) of plastic explosives strapped to perpetrator's body
- Deaths: 23 (including Premadasa and Perpetrator)
- Injuries: 38-60
- Victims: Ranasinghe Premadasa; E. E. P. Mohideen (Note: The valet of President Ranasinghe Premadasa.); SSP Ronnie Gunasinghe; Most of President's personal staff
- Perpetrator: Kulaveerasingam 'Babu' Veerakumar under orders of the Liberation Tigers of Tamil Eelam

Ranasinghe Premadasa, the 3rd President of Sri Lanka, was assassinated on 1 May 1993, in the Sri Lankan capital of Colombo, during a May Day rally organized by the United National Party (UNP). Premadasa and 23 others were killed in a suicide bombing conducted by the LTTE.

The explosion took place at around 12:45 PM at the junction of Armour Street and Grandpass Road in Hulftsdorp, Colombo. President Premadasa was unofficially supervising the procession as it was heading from Sugathadasa Stadium to its end destination of Galle Face Green. The suicide bomber was later identified as Kulaveerasingam Veerakumar (alias 'Babu'), who was working with direction from the LTTE and was a close friend of the President's valet, E. M. P. Mohideen. In addition to the 23 fatalities, an estimated 60 more were injured in the explosion. Confusion prevailed as it was unclear what had happened, with Premadasa and his security detail missing. His death was only confirmed several hours later by his personal physician when his ring and watch were identified on body parts found in the morgue.

The site of the explosion was cleaned within hours before a proper investigation was conducted. An island-wide curfew was imposed hours after the assassination. Prime Minister D. B. Wijetunga became acting president, and was officially sworn in on 7 May 1993. The government did not announce the death of President Premadasa until 6 PM local time when state-owned television network Rupavahini broadcast a tape of the BBC's report of the incident. A period of national mourning was announced until the funeral, which took place on 9 May 1993 at Independence Square in Colombo, Sri Lanka.

== Background ==
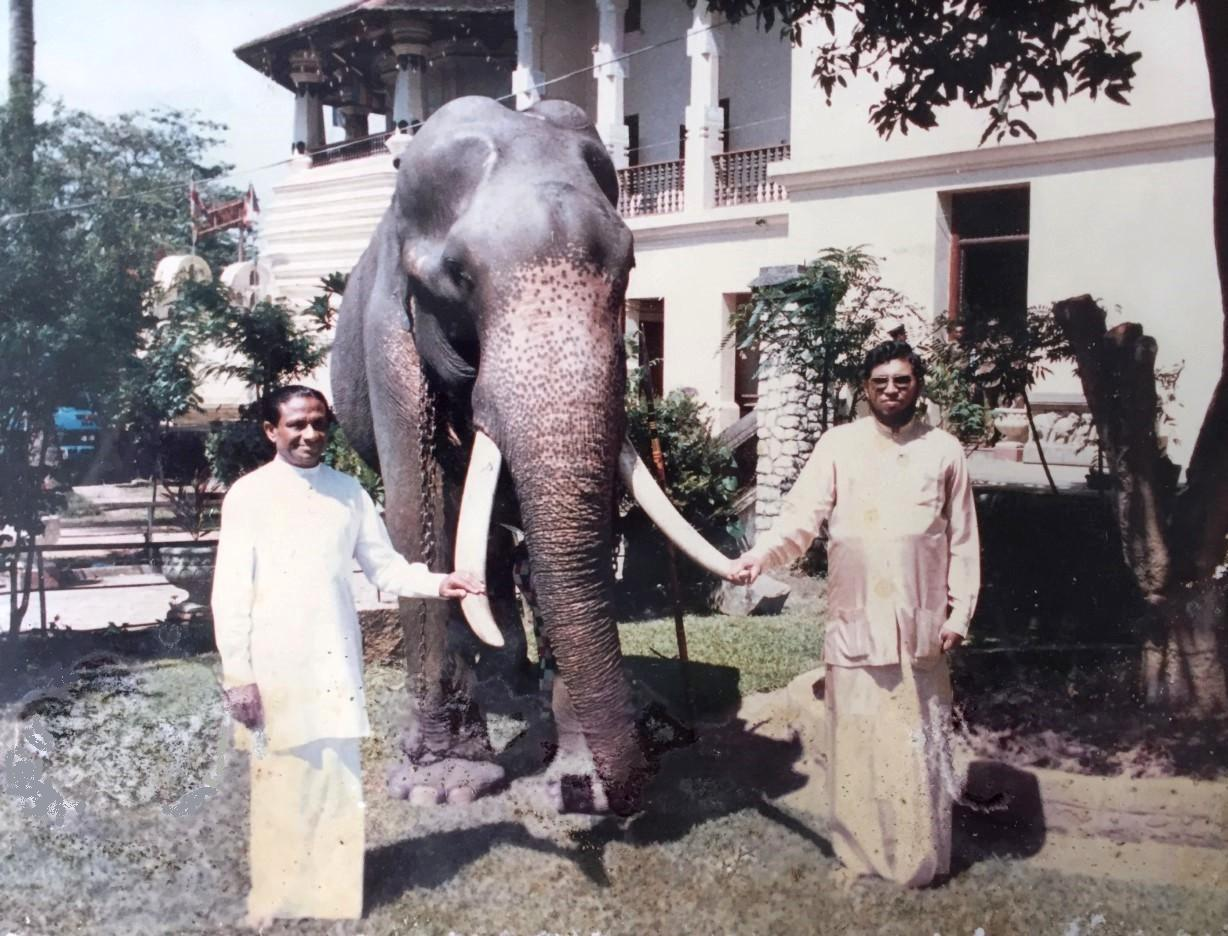
Premadasa (left) with Raja the Elephant and his caretaker Neranjan Wijeyeratne.

=== Premadasa ===
Ranasinghe Premadasa (born 1924) was the 3rd president of Sri Lanka. After serving as the country's 8th Prime Minister, and an MP from Colombo Central district, Premadasa was elected president in 1988. Soon after being elected president, he dissolved parliament and called for fresh elections. In the 1989 parliamentary election, his party, the UNP, won 125 seats, forming a government with a majority in parliament. At the time he became president, the country faced both a civil war in the north and a communist insurgency in the south, both key issues Premadasa concentrated on, with particularly ruthless actions against the insurgents. His security forces brutally put down the revolt and killed many of its leaders.

His handling of the country's civil war was less successful. In the north, the Liberation Tigers of Tamil Eelam (LTTE) faced off against the Indian Peace Keeping Force (IPKF). The Indian presence on the island was unpopular, and Premadasa requested India to pull its troops out of Sri Lanka. In order to force the IPKF to leave the island, Premadasa supplied arms to the LTTE to fight the IPKF-backed Eelam People's Revolutionary Liberation Front. (Note: This collusion came to light in the report published by the Sri Lankan Presidential Commission to inquire into the 1992 assassination of Lieutenant General Denzil Kobbekaduwa.) Premadasa's arming of the LTTE has since been acknowledged by his party, and many acknowledge that this may have set the government back severely in fighting the war. The 1990 massacre of Sri Lankan Police officers, which occurred after the policemen were asked to surrender to the LTTE in Batticaloa at Premadasa's request, was later established to have been performed with the same weapons he had supplied them. While the IPKF was recalled by New Delhi in 1990, the government's war with the LTTE resumed, beginning Eelam War II. By 1991, the LTTE retaliated against the Indian government by assassinating Indian Prime Minister Rajiv Gandhi.

In September 1991, Premadasa faced an impeachment attempt in parliament led by former prime minister Sirimavo Bandaranaike, and backed by two formidable rivals from his own political party, Lalith Athulathmudali and Gamini Dissanayake, both of whom were also eventually assassinated by the LTTE. Premadasa was accused of corruption, favoritism, nepotism, as well as subverting the Constitution. The impeachment proceedings were later dismissed by Speaker of the Parliament M. H. Mohamed due to a lack of signatures.

=== Liberation Tigers of Tamil Eelam ===
The Liberation Tigers of Tamil Eelam (LTTE) were a Tamil militant organization that was based in northeastern Sri Lanka. The LTTE fought to create an independent Tamil state, which they called Tamil Eelam, in the north-east of the island where the majority of Tamils resided. They cited the continuous discrimination and violent persecution against Sri Lankan Tamils by the Sinhalese-dominated Sri Lankan Government as their motive.

Founded in May 1976 by Velupillai Prabhakaran, the LTTE was involved in armed clashes against the Sri Lankan government and its armed forces. Initially starting out as a guerrilla force, the LTTE increasingly came to resemble that of a conventional fighting force with a well-developed military wing that included a navy, an airborne unit, an intelligence wing, and a specialised suicide attack unit. The LTTE popularised and perfected the use of a suicide vest as a weapon, a tactic now used by many current militant organizations.

In the years during and since the civil war, many nations have recognized the LTTE as a terrorist organization. Nations that have designated the LTTE as a terrorist group are: European Union, Canada, India, Malaysia, Sri Lanka, United Kingdom, and United States.

On May Day 1993, the LTTE employed Kulaveerasingam 'Babu' Veerakumar to target and assassinate President Premadasa.

=== Veerakumar and Mohideen ===
Kulaveerasingam Veerakumar, who commonly went under the alias 'Babu', was a 23-year old male from the coastal village of Gurunagar in Jaffna, who had spent years prior becoming acquainted with many people close to Premadasa. Specifically, Veerakumar exploited the president's valet, E.M.P Mohideen's fondness of liquor, to gain his confidence. According to former deputy inspector general with the Criminal Investigation Department, Amarasena Rajapakse, "The assassination occurred due to the negligence of domestic staff and mid-level security personnel." Rajapakse states that Veerakumar often flew in helicopters with advance presidential parties, including security men, in the company of Mohideen, but the valet carefully concealed him from Premadasa in such instances. Investigators believe Mohideen even helped Veerakumar pass a security check when he carried out the actual assassination. It is unknown if Mohideen had prior knowledge of the attack, considering that even he perished in it.

Veerakumar moved to Colombo in April 1992 and began operating a grocery shop. He also ran a trucking service that operated between Colombo and Jaffna. There were reportedly instances in which Mohideen allowed his trucks to pass without having to stop at checkpoints.

Rajapakse said that he had been warned in early March 1993 of an attempt to poison Premadasa, and advised Premadasa as well as his domestic and security staff. "I asked them the places where vegetables were purchased. We wanted the purchases to be made at random from different places. This was because of fears of poisoning... Our request for the domestic staff was if they knew anyone in particular getting close to them to let us know,' Rajapakse said. "But the answer, particularly by late Mr. Mohideen, was that there was nothing."

== Assassination ==
On 1 May 1993, Premadasa's political party, the United National Party, organised an event in commemoration of May Day. Politicians in Sri Lanka very often use this day to gain favor with laborers and labor unions. The rally started at Sugathadasa Stadium and was set to end at Galle Face Green.

At around 12:45 PM, Veerakumar rode a bicycle up to the president's Range Rover, and walked towards the President when security personnel attempted to stop him. By the time of the rally, Mohideen fully trusted Veerakumar, and told security to let him through. After Veerakumar got within 2.4–3.0 m (8–10 ft) of the president, he detonated an explosive belt that he had strapped to his body, killing himself, the President, Mohideen, SSP Ronnie Gunasinghe, and nineteen others including most of Premadasa's personal staff. Another estimated 38-60 people were injured in the bombing including seven who were seriously wounded. Confusion prevailed as it was unclear what had happened, with Premadasa and his security detail missing. His death was only confirmed several hours later by his personal physician when his ring and watch were identified on body parts found in the morgue.

== Immediate aftermath ==
The site of the explosion was cleaned within hours before a proper investigation was conducted. The May Day parade continued even after the explosion for some time as it was unclear what had happened. An island-wide curfew was imposed hours after the assassination. Twenty three people, including eighteen Tamils and two Sinhalese members of the president's domestic staff, were taken into custody in connection with the assassination. Security sources said those arrested included a sergeant from the police Special Task Force and a sergeant from the now disbanded Presidential Security Division, both of whom Veerakumar had entertained with liquor.

Prime Minister Dingiri Banda Wijetunga became acting president, and was officially elected and sworn in as the new president of Sri Lanka on 7 May 1993. The government did not announce the death of President Premadasa until 6 PM local time when state-owned television network Rupavahini broadcast a tape of the BBC's report of the incident. A period of national mourning was announced until the funeral, which took place on 9 May 1993 at Independence Square in Colombo.

Malaysian Prime Minister Mahathir Mohamad signed a condolence book at the Sri Lankan High Commission to pay his respects to slain Premadasa.

== Legacy ==
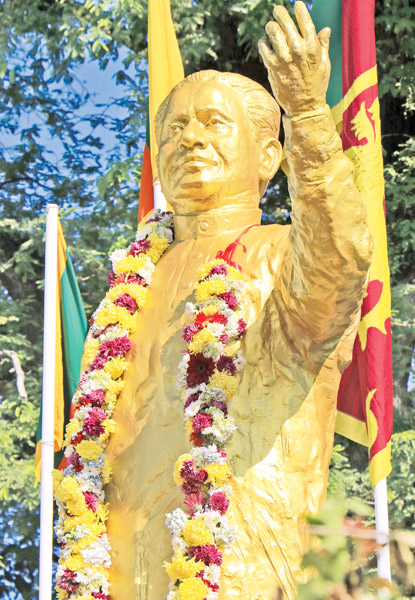
The Sri Lankabhimanya Ranasinghe Premadasa Memorial in Colombo, Sri Lanka

Amongst Sri Lankans, Premadasa has left behind a mixed legacy. While he was seen as a spokesperson of the poor, common man, his handling of the country's two civil conflicts, the JVP insurrection and the Sri Lankan Civil War, have been heavily criticised. While May Day is still celebrated in Sri Lanka, it is also a day of mourning for the death of the President.

The R. Premadasa International Cricket Stadium, which was built under Premadasa's supervision in 1986, still remains named after him.

The Sri Lankabhimanya Ranasinghe Premadasa Memorial is a statue depicting Premadasa, which stands in Hulftsdorp, Colombo.

The Former President Sri Lankabhimanya Ranasinghe Premadasa Memorial Monument stands at the location of the bomb blast, at the junction of Armour Street and Grandpass Road in Hulftsdorp.

Ranasinghe Premadasa's son, Sajith Premadasa, went on to become a politician in his own right. Sajith ran for president in 2019, winning 41.99% of the vote. He is the current Leader of the Opposition representing the Samagi Jana Balawegaya political party, a breakaway party of the United National Party which his father once led.

=== In popular culture ===
- The 1993 Indian Tamil-language film Gentleman was rewritten by the director S. Shankar based on the assassination of Ranasinghe Premadasa after a request by film producer K. T. Kunjumon. The film was in the post-production stage when Premadasa was assassinated, and the film was released on 30 July 1993.
- The 2013 Indian Hindi-language film Madras Cafe, which takes place during the Sri Lankan Civil War, refers to a Sri Lankan president being killed by a suicide bomber. While the film never names Premadasa, he is the only Sri Lankan president to be assassinated in this manner.

== See also ==
- Assassination of Rajiv Gandhi, another LTTE suicide bombing which killed Indian Prime Minister Rajiv Gandhi
