= S. S. Abeysundara =

Sri Lankan politician (1927–1989)

Sunil Subasiri Abeysundara

Deputy Minister of Fisheries
- In office 1977–1989
- Constituency: Yatinuwara

Personal details
- Born: 15 April 1927
- Died: 1989 (aged 61–62)
- Party: United National Party

Sunil Subasiri Abeysundara (15 April 1927 – 1989) was a Sri Lankan politician. He was the Deputy Minister of Fisheries and member of Parliament of Sri Lanka from Yatinuwara representing the United National Party.

Abeysundara was elected to parliament from Yatinuwara in the March 1960 general election defeating Hector Kobbekaduwa (future presidential candidate) and D.B. Wijetunga (future President of Sri Lanka), but lost his seat in the July 1960 general election to U. B. Weerasekera. He was elected again in the 1965 general election defeating Weerasekera. He then lost the 1970 general election to Hector Kobbekaduwa and was able to defeat Kobbekaduwa in the 1977 general election and was appointed Deputy Minister of Fisheries.

Abeysundara died in 1989.
