= Weerasekera =

Weerasekera is a surname. Notable people with the surname include:

- Dhanapala Weerasekera (1924–2011), Ceylonese politician
- J. D. Weerasekera (1917–2011), Ceylonese politician
- U. B. Weerasekera (fl. 1960–1964), Sri Lankan politician
