= T. B. Jayasundera =

Sri Lankan politician (1927–2009)

Member of the Ceylon Parliament for Udunuwara
- In office 1960–1965
- Succeeded by: D. B. Wijetunga

Personal details
- Born: Tikiri Banda Jayasundera; 4 May 1927
- Party: Sri Lanka Freedom Party
- Spouse: L. K. Jayasundera

Tikiri Banda Jayasundera (4 May 1927 – before 17 September 2009) was a Ceylonese politician and Member of Parliament. He represented the Udunuwara electorate from the Sri Lanka Freedom Party (SLFP). He was defeated by D. B. Wijetunga in the 1965 general parliamentary elections. Jayasundera is deceased.
