= 1993 Sri Lankan presidential election =

Indirect Sri Lankan presidential election held in 1993

- 7 May 1993
Candidate	Dingiri Banda Wijetunga
Party	UNP
Electoral vote	Unopposed
President before election
Dingiri Banda Wijetunga (acting)
UNP
Elected President
Dingiri Banda Wijetunga
UNP

An indirect presidential election was held in the Parliament of Sri Lanka on 7 May 1993, following the assassination of president Ranasinghe Premadasa by the Liberation Tigers of Tamil Eelam in Colombo. The president of Sri Lanka was elected by the Parliament of Sri Lanka in a secret ballot to decide who would complete the remainder of Premadasa's term.

Incumbent prime minister and acting president Dingiri Banda Wijetunga was the only contester for the presidency and was unanimously elected, without a vote, as the fourth president of Sri Lanka. He was named as the candidate of the ruling United National Party. Wijetunga was to continue the presidential term of Premadasa until the 1994 Sri Lankan presidential election was held in November 1994.

== Procedure ==
According to the Presidential Elections (Special Provisions) Act of 1981, "Where the office of President becomes vacant in terms of paragraph (1) of Article 38 of the Constitution, as provided by Article 40 of the Constitution, Parliament shall elect as President one of its members who is qualified to be elected to the office of President, to hold office for the unexpired period of the term of office of the President vacating office.

== Election schedule ==
According to the Presidential Elections (Special Provisions) Act of 1981, "Where the office of President becomes vacant in terms of paragraph (1) of Article 38 of the Constitution, as provided by Article 40 of the Constitution, Parliament shall elect as President one of its members who is qualified to be elected to the office of President, to hold office for the unexpired period of the term of office of the President vacating office." The constitution requires for a successor to be elected within 30 days.

Date	Day	Event
1 May 1993	Saturday	President Ranasinghe Premadasa is assassinated by a LTTE bomb blast in Colombo while attending a May Day rally.
1 May 1993	Saturday	Prime Minister Dingiri Banda Wijetunga takes oath as acting president.
1 May 1993	Saturday	Speaker announces presidential election through Parliament within seven days.
7 May 1993	Friday	Secretary General of Parliament officially informs the House that the office of President has fallen vacant and calls for nominations.
7 May 1993	Friday	As he was the sole candidate, prime minister Dingiri Banda Wijetunga is elected as the 4th president of Sri Lanka without a vote, and assumes office until the end of Premadasa's term.

== Candidates ==
=== Declared ===
Candidate	Political office and constituency	Date declared	Proposer/ seconder	Notes	Ref.
Dingiri Banda Wijetunga (77); United National Party	Acting President (1–7 May 1993); Prime Minister (1989–1993); Kandy	7 May 1993	Wijayapala Mendis; A. C. S. Hameed	Elected unanimously.	

== Aftermath ==
Following his appointment, Wijetunga appointed UNP MP Ranil Wickremesinghe as Prime Minister.

The UNP government was defeated by the Sri Lanka Freedom Party led by Chandrika Kumaratunga in the August 1994 parliamentary elections, thus Kumaratunga would briefly succeed Wickremesinghe as Prime Minister.

== See also ==
- 9th Parliament of Sri Lanka
- Assassination of Ranasinghe Premadasa
