= Yatinuwara Electoral District =

Electoral district of Sri Lanka

Yatinuwara electoral district was an electoral district of Sri Lanka between March 1960 and February 1989. The district was named after the town of Yatinuwara in Kandy District, Central Province. The 1978 Constitution of Sri Lanka introduced the proportional representation electoral system for electing members of Parliament. The existing 160 mainly single-member electoral districts were replaced with 22 multi-member electoral districts. Yatinuwara electoral district was replaced by the Kandy multi-member electoral district at the 1989 general elections.

== Members of Parliament ==
Key

Independent SLFP UNP

Election	Member	Party	Term
1960 (March)	S. S. Abeysundara	United National Party	1960
1960 (July)	U. B. Weerasekera	Sri Lanka Freedom Party	190-1964
1965	S. S. Abeysundara	United National Party	1965-1970
1970	Hector Kobbekaduwa	Sri Lanka Freedom Party	1970-1977
1977	S. S. Abeysundara	United National Party	1977-1989

== Elections ==
=== 1960 (March) Parliamentary General Election ===
Results of the 4th parliamentary election held on 19 March 1960:

Candidate	Party	Symbol	Votes	%
S. S. Abeysundara		Elephant	4,352	
Hector Kobbekaduwa		Hand	4,159	
D.B. Wijetunga		Sun	3,156	
Valid Votes				
Rejected Votes			155	
Total Polled			16,527	100.00
Registered Electors			20,983	
Turnout				

=== 1960 (July) Parliamentary General Election ===
Results of the 5th parliamentary election held on 20 July 1960:

Candidate	Party	Symbol	Votes	%
Valid Votes				
Rejected Votes				
Total Polled				100.00
Registered Electors				
Turnout				

=== 1965 Parliamentary General Election ===
Results of the 6th parliamentary election held on 22 March 1965:

Candidate	Party	Symbol	Votes	%
Valid Votes				
Rejected Votes				
Total Polled				100.00
Registered Electors				
Turnout				

=== 1970 Parliamentary General Election ===
Results of the 7th parliamentary election held on 27 May 1970:

Candidate	Party	Symbol	Votes	%
Valid Votes				
Rejected Votes				
Total Polled				100.00
Registered Electors				
Turnout				

=== 1977 Parliamentary General Election ===
Results of the 7th parliamentary election held on 21 July 1977:

Candidate	Party	Symbol	Votes	%
Valid Votes				
Rejected Votes				
Total Polled				100.00
Registered Electors				
Turnout				
