= Hector Kobbekaduwa =

Sri Lankan politician (1916–1983)

Hon. Hector Kobbekaduwa
- හෙක්ටර් කොබ්බෑකඩුව

Minister for Agriculture and Lands
- In office 1970–1977
- Prime Minister: Sirimavo Bandaranaike
- Preceded by: M. D. Banda
- Succeeded by: Lionel Senanayake

Member of Parliament for Yatinuwara
- In office 1970–1977
- Preceded by: S. S. Abeysundara
- Succeeded by: S. S. Abeysundara
- Majority: 5,493 (1970)

Personal details
- Born: 19 August 1916
- Died: 18 September 1983 (aged 67)
- Party: Sri Lanka Freedom Party
- Occupation: Politician
- Profession: Advocate

Hector Senarath Rajakaruna Bandara Kobbekaduwa (29 August 1916 – 17 September 1983) was a Sri Lankan politician and lawyer. He was the Sri Lanka Freedom Party candidate in the 1982 Sri Lankan presidential election and the Minister for Agriculture and Lands from 1970 to 1977. He is remembered for nationalizing privately owned land and restricting the ownership of private land to 20 hectares for the purpose of giving land to landless peasants. He created collectively owned settlement programs called Janawasas in some of the land that was acquired. He contested the 1982 presidential election and lost. The campaign of the SLFP led by him advocated for restoring previous Sri Lanka Freedom Party policies. His opponents ran an effective campaign criticising the closed economy & socialist policies of his Sri Lanka Freedom Party-led regime from 1970 to 1977; they blamed the SLFP policies for creating scarcities of essential goods and unemployment. Although the SLFP led by him lost the 1982 Sri Lankan presidential election, he managed to gain a significant number of votes in Tamil-speaking areas like Point Pedro, defeating Tamil nationalist parties.

== Early life and education ==
He was born to a prominent family from Yatinuwara. His father was Dr Tikiri Banda Kobbekaduwa, the first British qualified physician from Kandy and his mother was Sangamitta Dullewe Kumarihamy from Matale. Educated at Trinity College, Kandy, he studied Law at the Ceylon Law College, taking oath as an Advocate in 1942. He started his legal practice in Kandy.

== Political career ==
Entering politics in 1947, Kobbekaduwa joined the Mahanuwara Samajawadi Peramuna founded by Herbert Sri Nissanka, QC and T. B. Ilangaratne. He became a member of the Sri Lanka Freedom Party (SLFP), when it was formed in 1952. In 1954, he contested the Ampitiya Ward and was elected as a member of the Kandy Municipal Council, where he served until 1960. He was appointed by the Mahajana Eksath Party which was led by S.W.R.D. Bandaranaike to a fact-finding mission to formulate what was to become the Paddy Lands Act. Kobbekaduwa contested the March 1960 general election from the Yatinuwara electorate and was defeated by the United National Party candidate S. S. Abeysundara. He did not contest the July 1960 general election and following it he was appointed as Chairman of the Public Service Commission by Sirimavo Bandaranaike.

=== Minister for Agriculture and Lands ===
In the 1970 general elections, he was elected as a member of parliament from the Yatinuwara electorate, and was appointed Minister for Agriculture and Lands by Sirimavo Bandaranaike. During his tenure he introduced the Land Reforms Act which nationalized private land and limited private holdings to 50 acres. From the nationalized lands he initiated the Janawasas scheme which gave land to the landless. He initiated the Agrarian Research and Training Centre (ARTI) in 1972 as well as the Land Reforms Commission and the State Plantations Corporation. He established Agricultural Productivity Centres at the village level.

The Land Reforms Act resulted in a major social change in the country as the old landed gentry lost their primary source of wealth and reduced their political influence. The land reforms of the 1970s under Kobbekaduwa saw the nationalization of large extents of private land and vesting of these in public companies such as State Planation Corporation. Only less than 12% of the land acquired were redistributed to landless peasants. Following the land reforms, the production of the primary economic crops of Tea, Rubber and Coconut dropped following in reduced productivity of the nationalized estates. This effected the national economy which depended on economic crops as a source of foreign exchange.

The resulting economic stagnation and import restrictions resulted in major public discontent and food shortage in the country leading to massive defeat of the Sri Lanka Freedom Party in the 1977 Sri Lankan parliamentary election and Kobbekaduwa losing his own seat.

=== Presidential candidate ===
When presidential elections were called in 1982, the leader of the SLFP Sirimavo Bandaranaike could not contest as she had had her civic rights suspended by parliament in 1980 for seven years. Therefore, the SLFP nominated Kobbekaduwa as its candidate. He gained 39.07% of the votes against the incumbent J. R. Jayewardene who gained 52.91%.

== Legacy ==
The Agrarian Research and Training Centre was renamed as the Hector Kobbekaduwa Agrarian Research and Training Institute in his memory.
