= Molagoda =

Coordinates: 7°15′N 80°23′E

- Village
- Interactive map of Molagoda
- Country: Sri Lanka
- Province: Sabaragamuwa Province
- Time zone: UTC+5:30 (Sri Lanka Standard Time)

Molagoda is a village in Sri Lanka. It is located within Sabaragamuwa Province.

== See also ==
- List of settlements in Sabaragamuwa Province
