= Heiyantuduwa Raja =

Sri Lankan elephant

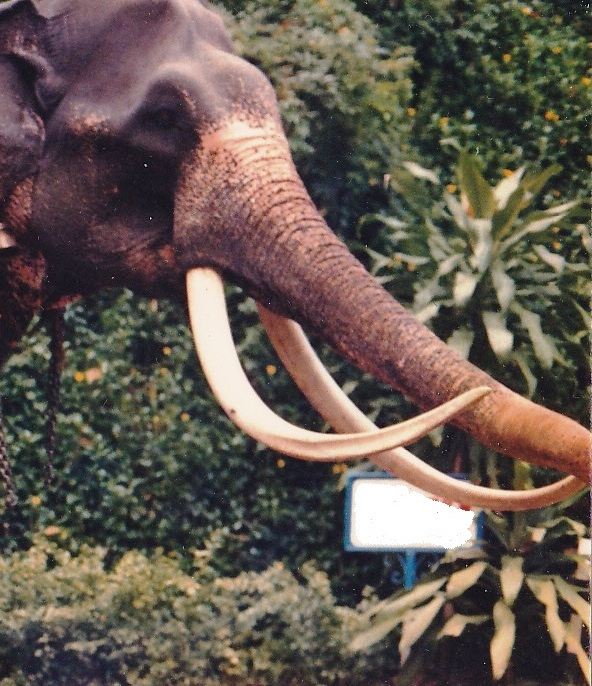

Main casket bearer of the procession of Esala
- Held title 1991–1998
- Preceded by: Raja & Saman Raja
- Succeeded by: Ruwan Raja & Millangoda Raja

Personal details
- Born: c. 1924 Hambantota District, Sri Lanka
- Died: 6 November 2002 (aged about 78) Kandy District, Sri Lanka
- Resting place: National Museum of Colombo
- Occupation: Main casket bearer of the Kandy Esala Perahera
- Species: Sri Lankan elephant (Elephas maximus maximus)
- Sex: Male
- Owner: Gunasekara family of Heiyantuduwa

Heiyantuduwa Raja (Sinhala:හෙයියන්තුඩුවේ රාජා)(c. 1924 – 6 November 2002) was a Sri Lankan elephant, which carried the Relic of the tooth of the Buddha casket in the Dalada Perahera for 11 years after the demise of Maligawa Raja. Heiyantuduwa Raja's tusks were each 7 ft 6 in (2.3 m) in length when he was living, and it was considered one of the longest-tusked elephants in the country.

== Owner ==
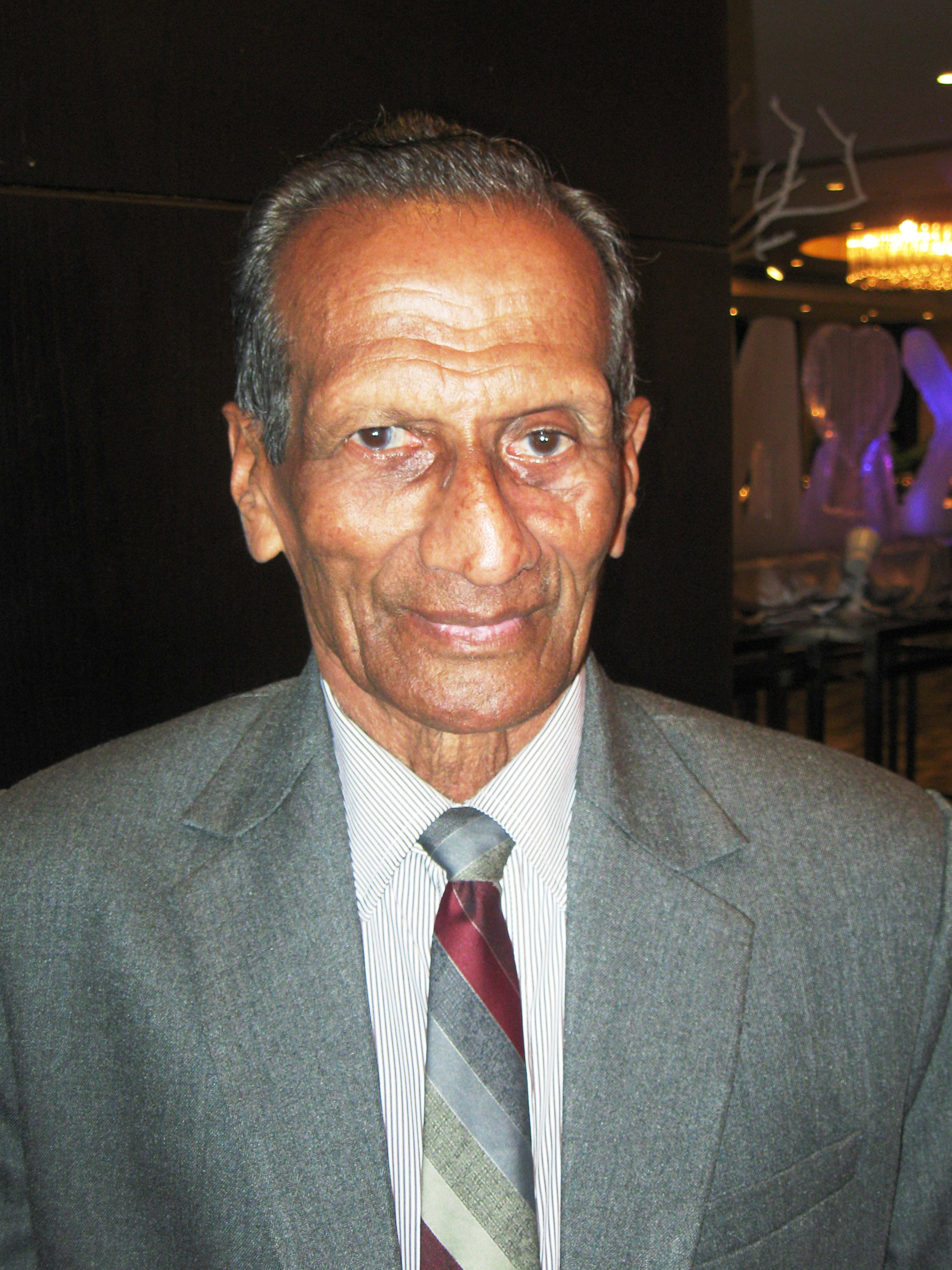
Henry Gunasekara, the last owner of Heiyantudawa Raja

First owner of Heiyantuduwa Raja, William Gunasekara with his wife Eugine Gunasekara

Heiyantuduwa Raja was captured from the Kattakaduwana jungle in Hambantota District. On 8 March 1945, the tusker had been publicly auctioned by then British Ceylon government at Hambantota Kachcheri. William Gunasekara (also known as 'Heiyantuduwa Ralahami') of Heiyantuduwa in Biyagama had bought him for 10,500 Rupees. Gunasekara was a wealthy landed proprietor and owned fourteen elephants at that era. Later, Heiyantuduwa Raja was owned by his youngest son, Henry Gunasekara of Kandy.

== Historic Elephant ==
Heiyantuduwe Raja participated at the Esala Perahera in Kandy for several years. After the demise of Maligawa Raja, he also carried the casket of tooth relic for 11 years from 1989 to 2000 with permission from Neranjan Wijeyeratne, then Diyawadana Nilame of Sri Dalada Maligawa. Carrying the casket of tooth relic was an opportunity bestowed upon only a few elephants in Sri Lanka. Heiyantuduwe Raja had also carried the main casket of Buddha's relics at the Kelaniya Duruthu Perahera, Bellanwila Perahera and Gangaramaya Navam Perahera in addition to the Sri Dalada casket.

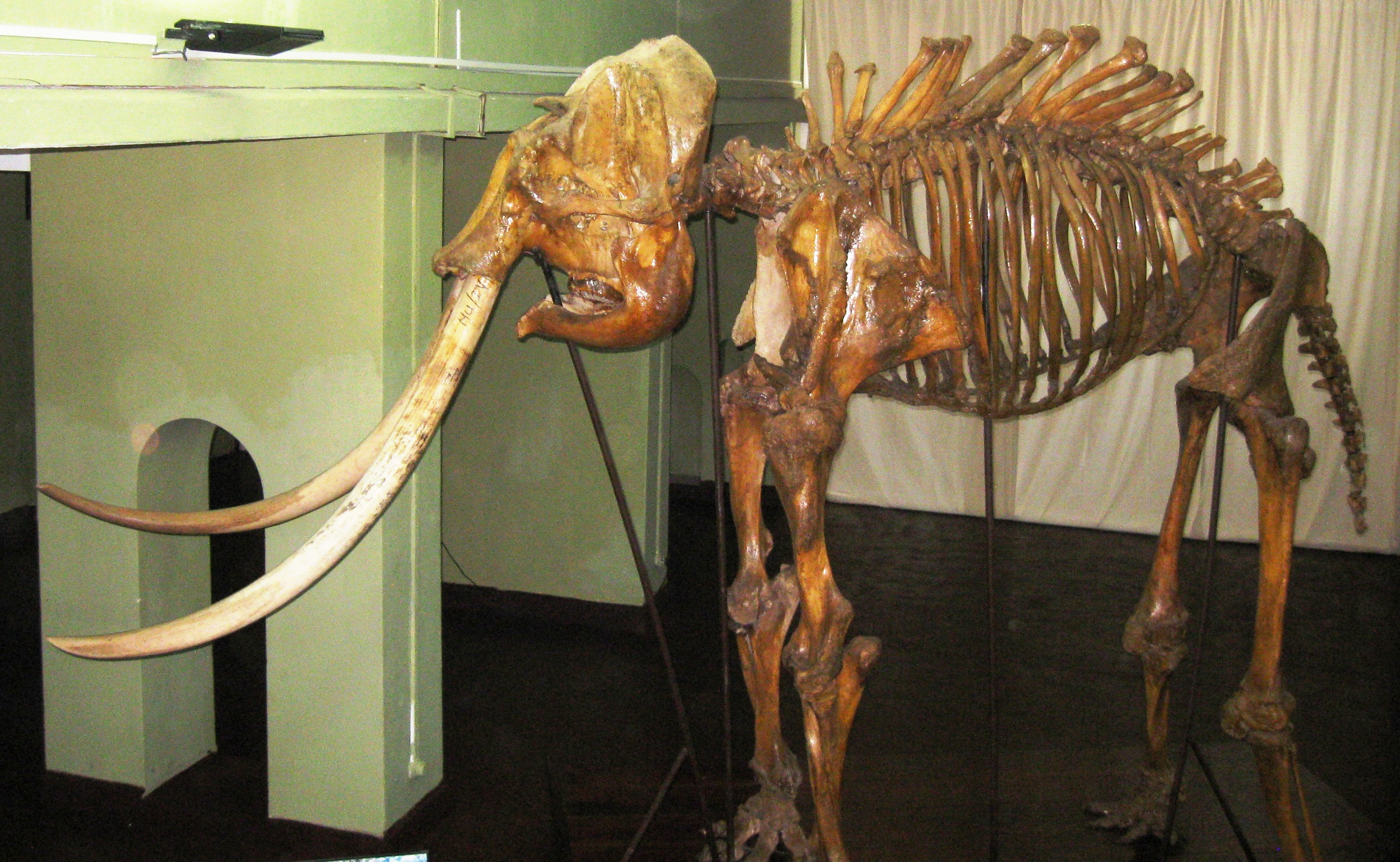
Heiyantuduwa Raja's Skeleton at National Museum, Colombo

Heiyantuduwa Raja's Skeleton Opening Ceremony to public display at National Museum, Colombo Sri Lanka on 29 January 2013 by Dr. Jagath Balasooriya Cabinet Minister of National Heritage

== In popular culture ==
In Indiana Jones and the Temple of Doom, Heiyantuduwa Raja was featured in scenes filmed around Kandy, where actor Harrison Ford rode on his back.

== National Heritage ==
Heiyantuduwa Raja died on 6 November 2002. He was about 78 years old at the time of his death. Despite an offer of 120,000 U.S. Dollars by a Japanese company, Henry Gunasekara gave his skeleton to the Sri Lankan government in recognition of his part in the nation's heritage. Heiyantuduwa Raja's skeleton has been on display to the public at the National Museum of Colombo since 29 January 2013

== See also ==
- Raja (elephant)
- Nadungamuwa Raja
- List of individual elephants
