= Kandy Esala Perahera =

Festival held August in Kandy, Sri Lanka

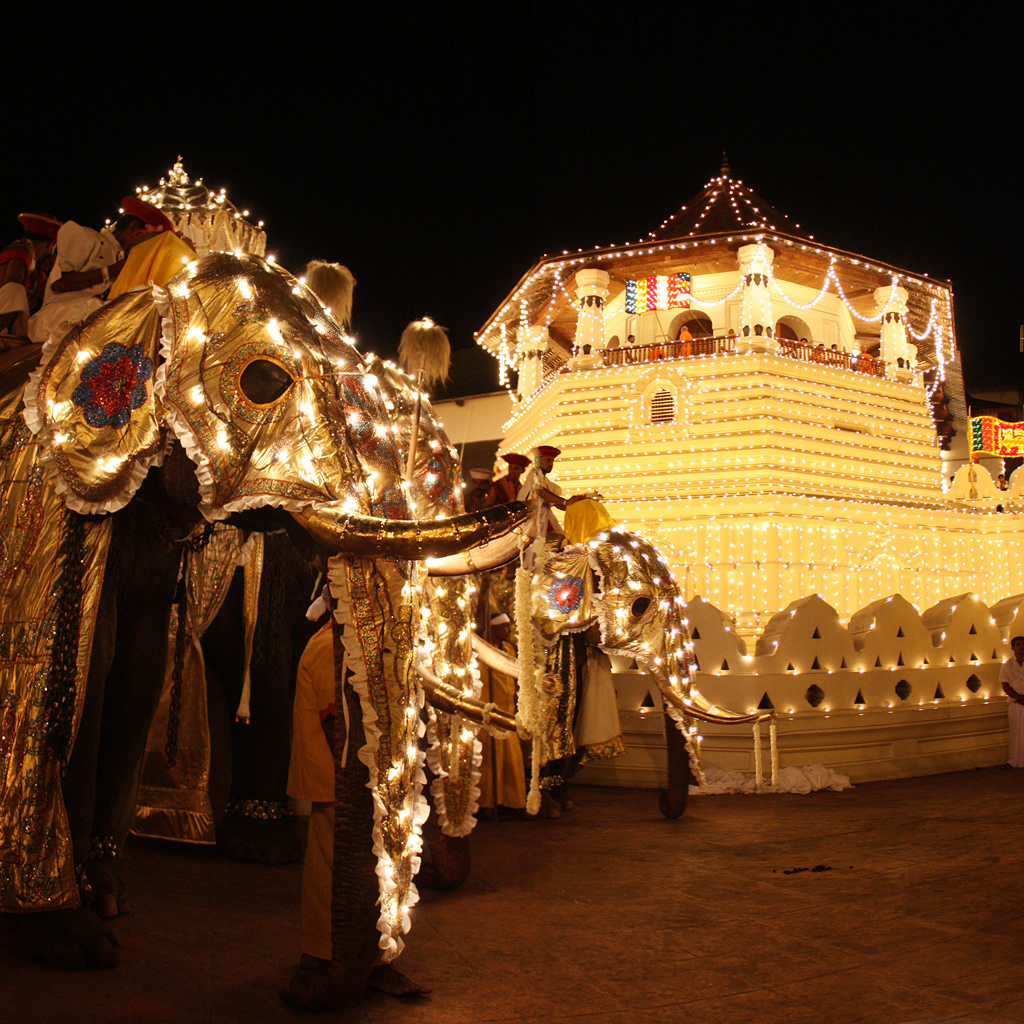
Perahera Tuskers in front of Temple of the Tooth

The Kandy Esala Perahera (the Sri Dalada Perahara procession of Kandy) also known as The Festival of the Tooth, is an annual religious and cultural festival held in the months of July and August in Kandy, Sri Lanka. This historic procession is conducted to pay homage to the Sacred Tooth Relic of the Buddha, which is enshrined at the Sri Dalada Maligawa (Temple of the Sacred Tooth Relic) in Kandy.

The Perahera is considered a unique symbol of Sri Lankan heritage and features a vibrant array of traditional performances, including fire dances, whip dances, and other cultural displays. The festival concludes with the Diya Kepeema, a water-cutting ceremony held at the Mahaweli River in Getambe, Kandy.

== History ==
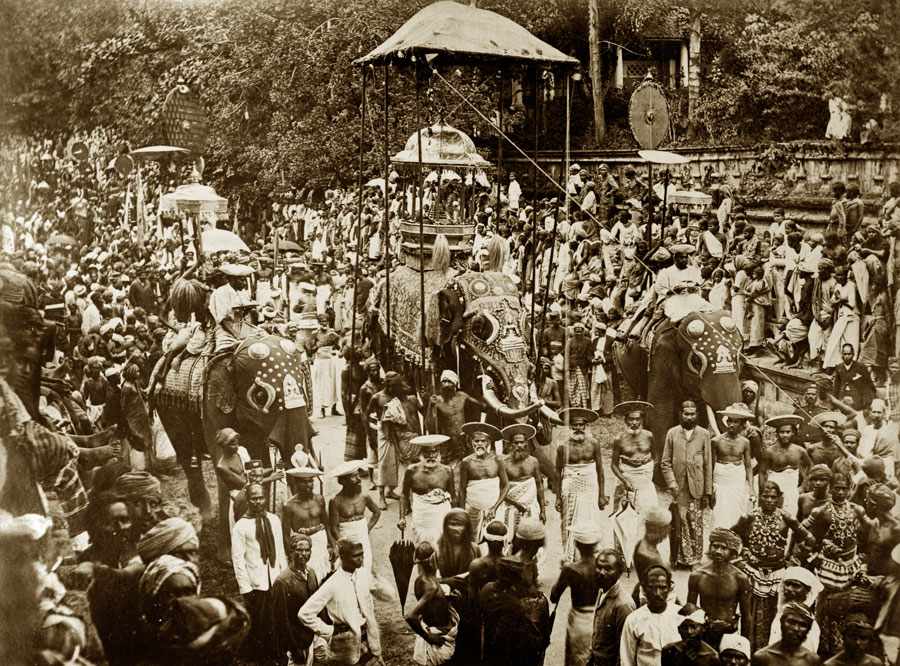
Esala Perehera festival, around 1885

The Esala Perahera is believed to be a fusion of two distinct yet interconnected processions: the Esala Perahera and the Dalada Perahera. The Esala Perahera, which is thought to have originated in the 3rd century BCE, was a ritual performed to invoke the blessings of the gods for timely rainfall. The Dalada Perahera is said to have commenced following the arrival of the Sacred Tooth Relic of the Buddha in Sri Lanka from India during the 4th century CE, approximately eight centuries after the passing of the Buddha.

=== Modern Perahera ===
The present form of the Perahera dates back to the period of the Kingdom of Kandy; however, the tradition of parading the Sacred Tooth Relic is over 1,500 years old. The efforts of the Buddhist monk Upali Thera played a significant role in the evolution of the Kandy Esala Perahera. Initially, the procession primarily honoured Brahminical deities who had been assimilated into local Buddhist practices. Upali Thera considered this approach inconsistent with the Buddhist principles of the nation. Influenced by his teachings, the reigning king proclaimed: "Henceforth, gods and men are to follow the Buddha."

Following the fall of the Kandyan Kingdom to the British in 1815, the custody of the Sacred Tooth Relic was entrusted to the Maha Sangha (the Buddhist monastic order). In the absence of a ruling monarch, the position of Diyawadana Nilame (chief lay custodian) was instituted to oversee the day-to-day administrative functions relating to the relic and its veneration.

== The Procession ==
The Kandy Esala Perahera begins with the Kap Situveema (also known as Kappa), a ritual in which a sanctified young jackfruit tree (Artocarpus integrifolia) is cut and planted in the premises of each of the four Devales (shrines) dedicated to the guardian deities—Natha, Vishnu, Katharagama, and the goddess Pattini. Traditionally, this ceremony was believed to invoke blessings upon the king and the people.

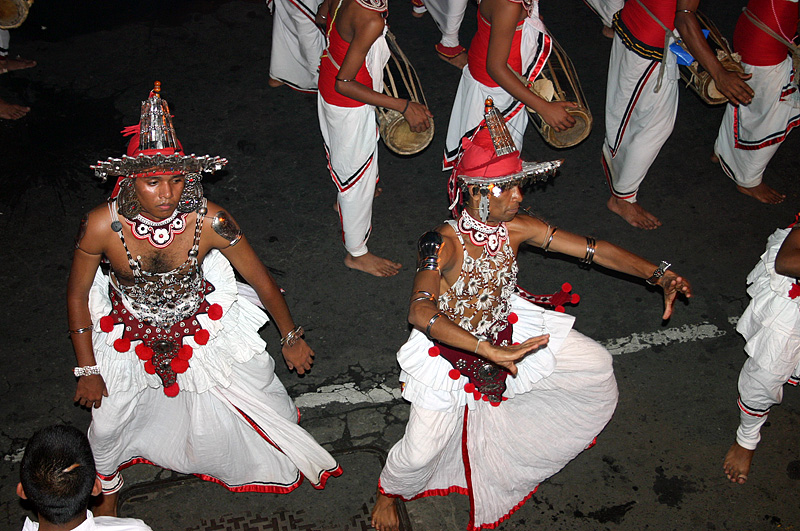
Dancers at the Esala Perahera

=== The Kumbal Perahera ===
For the next five nights, the Devale Peraheras are conducted within the precincts of the four Devales. Each evening, the chief priest of the respective Devale leads the procession, accompanied by traditional drummers, musicians, flag and canopy bearers, spearmen, and the Ran Ayudha (golden insignia of the deities). On the sixth night, the Kumbal Perahera commences and continues for five days.

The Devale Peraheras converge in front of the Temple of the Sacred Tooth Relic (Sri Dalada Maligawa), the most venerated Buddhist site in Sri Lanka, where the Sacred Tooth Relic has been housed since the 16th century. The insignia of each deity is placed in a ransivige (a domed canopy) and carried in procession by elephants under the guidance of the respective Basnayake Nilames (lay custodians of the Devales).

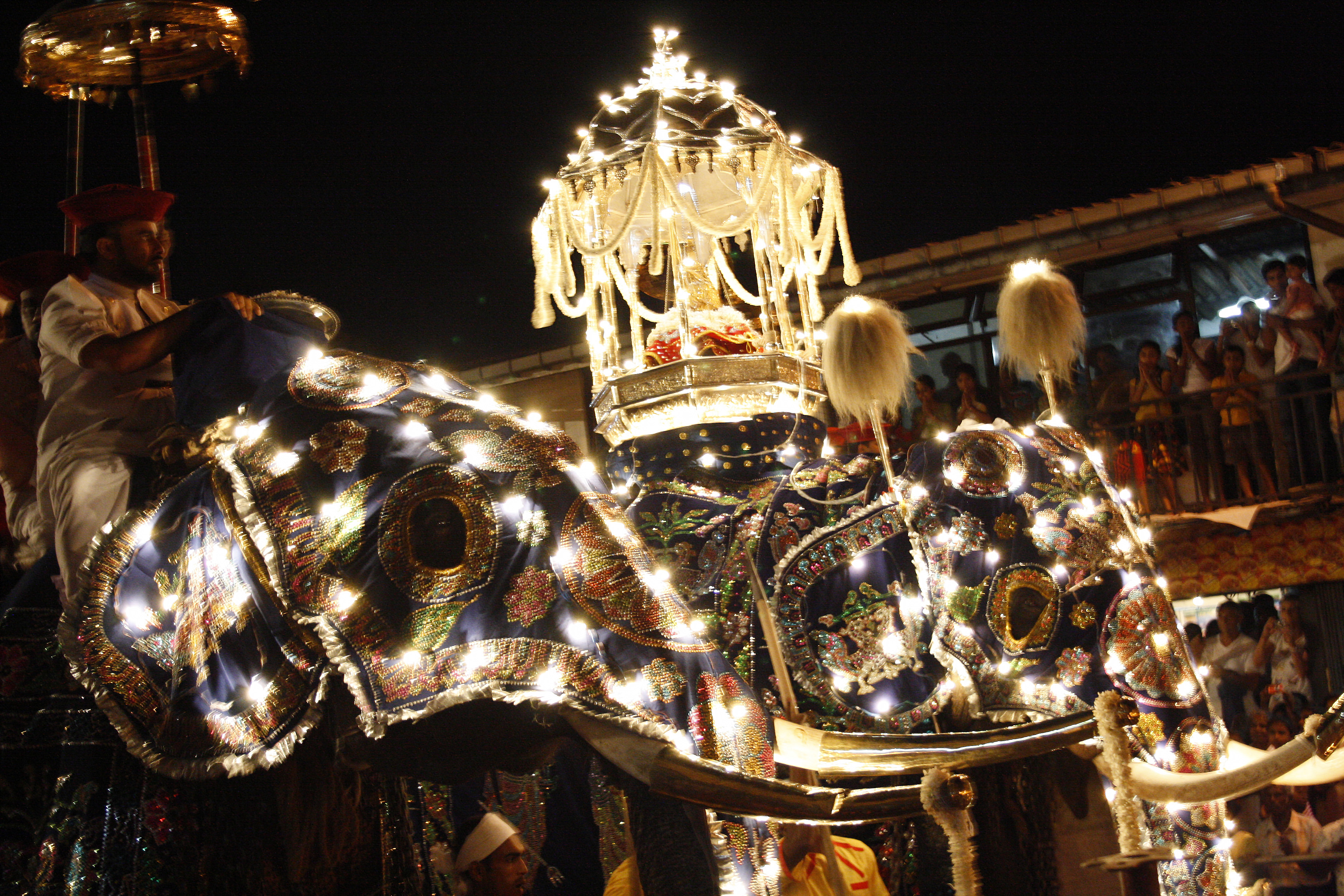
Ceremonial Tusker carrying the Sacred Casket

The Sacred Casket, a replica of the Tooth Relic, is enshrined in a ransivige mounted on the back of the Maligawa Tusker. The Maligawa Perahera then leads the main procession. Whip-crackers and fireball acrobats go ahead to clear the path, followed by Buddhist flag bearers. Leading the official segment is the Peramuna Rala (Front Official), mounted on the first elephant.

He is followed by traditional Kandyan drummers and dancers, who captivate the onlookers with their performances. Subsequent sections include additional elephants, musicians, dancers, and flag bearers. A group of singers clad in white heralds the arrival of the Maligawa Tusker carrying the Sacred Casket. Behind the tusker walks the Diyawadana Nilame, the chief lay custodian of the relic, dressed in ceremonial Kandyan attire. Traditionally, he is considered responsible for invoking rainfall in due season.

The second procession originates from the Natha Devale, situated facing the Dalada Maligawa. It is considered the oldest building in Kandy, dating back to the 14th century. The third procession is from the Vishnu Devale (also known as Maha Devale), dedicated to the Hindu god Vishnu, and located in front of the main entrance to the Natha Devale.

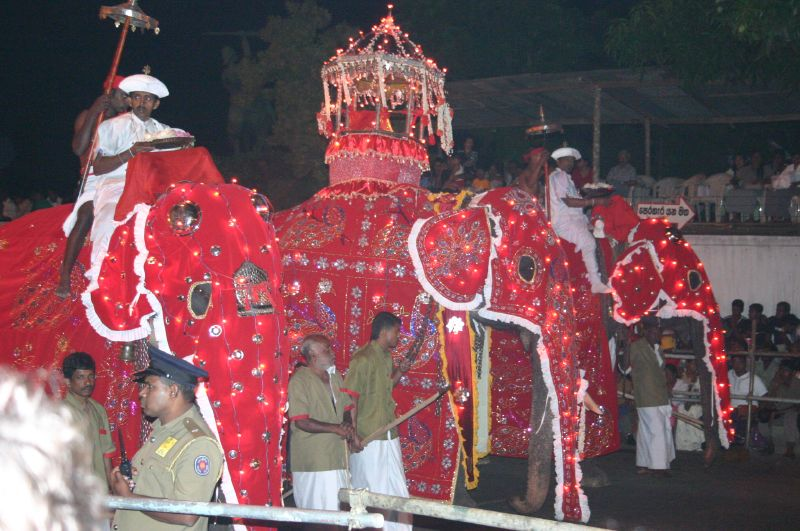
The procession of Kataragama Devale

The fourth procession comes from the Kataragama Devale, dedicated to Kataragama deviyo (identified with the warrior god Skanda). This Devale is located on Kottugodalle Vidiya in Kandy. A unique element of this segment is the Kavadi dance, where pilgrims perform a traditional peacock dance while carrying semi-circular wooden structures adorned with peacock feathers on their shoulders.

The fifth and final procession is from the Pattini Devale, located west of the Natha Devale. The goddess Pattini is associated with the cure of infectious diseases and is invoked during times of drought and famine. This is the only procession that includes female dancers.

Key events during the Perahera are signalled by the firing of cannonballs, audible across Kandy. These include:

1. The commencement of the Devale Peraheras
2. The placement of the casket on the tusker's back
3. The commencement of the Dalada Perahera
4. The conclusion of the Perahera

=== The Randoli Perahera ===
The Randoli Perahera begins after the conclusion of the five nights of the Kumbal Perahera. Randoli refers to the royal palanquins in which the queens of the ancient Kandyan kings were carried. The final Randoli Perahera usually holds on the Nikini full moon Poya day, and witnessed the participation of hundreds of thousands of spectators.

=== Diya Kepeema and the Day Perahera ===
After five nights of the Randoli Perahera, the festival concludes with the Diya Kepeema, a traditional water-cutting ceremony held at the Mahaweli River in Getambe, a town located a few kilometres from Kandy. A Day Perahera is conducted to mark the occasion.

== Organisation of the Perahera ==
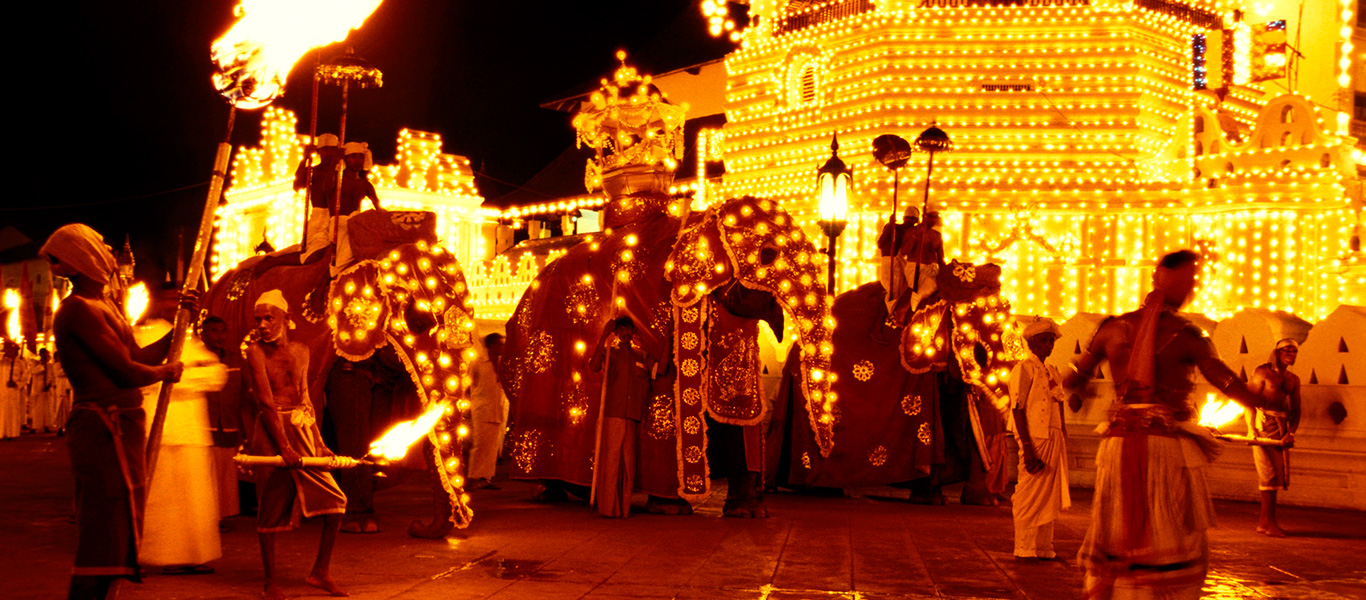
Elephant at the Kandy Esala Perahera

The rituals associated with the Sacred Tooth Relic are conducted by the monks of the Malwatte and Asgiriya Chapters of the Buddhist monastic order in Sri Lanka. The overall responsibility for organising the Perahera rests with the Diyawadana Nilame, the chief lay custodian of the Temple of the Sacred Tooth Relic.

The Diyawadana Nilame convenes the officials of the Sri Dalada Maligawa and assigns them specific ceremonial duties in preparation for the festival. The initial step involves consulting the Nekath Mohottala, the official astrologer, to determine the most auspicious times for the commencement and various rituals of the Perahera.

The responsibility of coordinating the various drumming groups is delegated to four senior officials known as the Panikka Mura Baarakaruwo. Meanwhile, officials from the Maligawa liaise with the owners of the elephants selected to participate in the procession, as the majority of elephants are privately owned.

The invited dance troupes are given time to rehearse and prepare their performances. Subsequently, the Basnayake Nilames, the lay custodians of the four Devales (shrines), are instructed to make arrangements for their respective Devale Peraheras.

== Perahera Sandeshaya ==
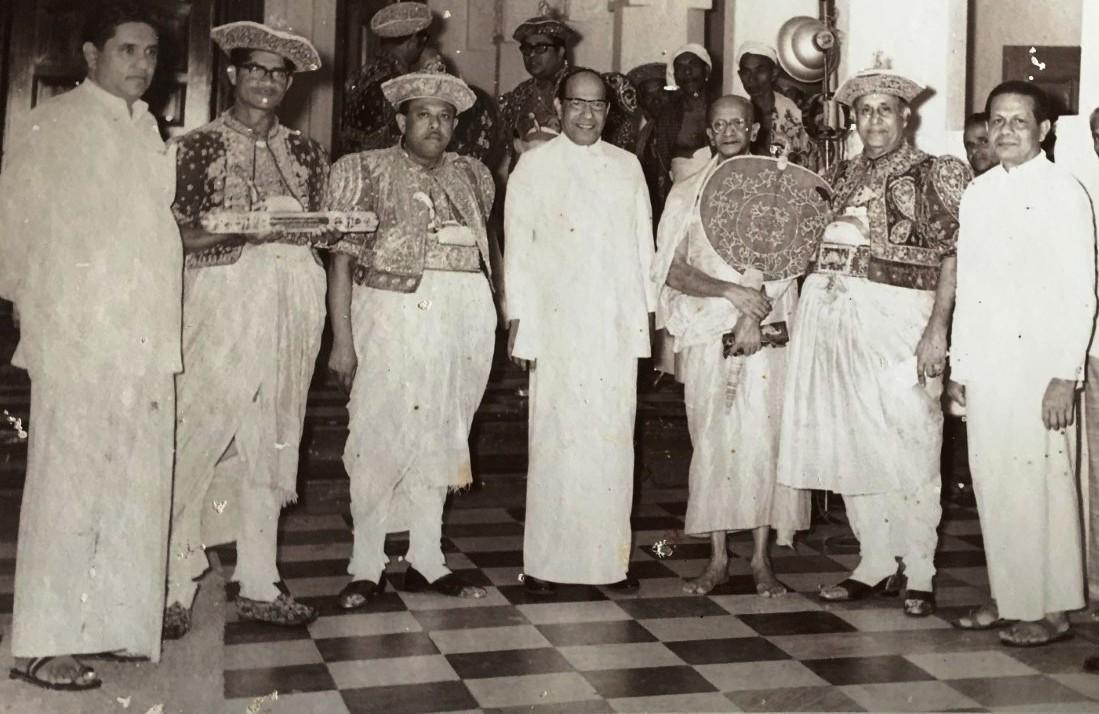
President William Gopallawa receiving the sannasa.

Upon the conclusion of the Esala Perahera, the Diyawadana Nilame leads a ceremonial procession comprising the Nilames of the Sathara Maha Devalas and the Nilames of rural devalas to the President's Pavilion. This procession carries a formal letter, known as the Perahera Sandeshaya, addressed to the President, signifying the successful completion of that year's Esala Perahera.

The President traditionally receives the sannasa at the entrance to the Pavilion, in a symbolic gesture acknowledging the continuation of this significant cultural and religious event.

== Notable Sacred Casket Bearer Tuskers ==
Several distinguished tusker elephants have served as the main casket bearers (Dalada Maligawa tuskers) during the Kandy Esala Perahera. These elephants carried the Sacred Casket containing the replica of the Sacred Tooth Relic of the Buddha and played a central role in the procession. Notable among them are:

- Raja (රාජා)
- Heiyantuduwa Raja (හෙයියන්තුඩුවේ රාජා)
- Millangoda Raja (මිල්ලන්ගොඩ රාජා)
- Nadungamuwa Raja (නැදුන්ගමුවේ රාජා)

These tuskers are revered in Sri Lankan cultural and religious history for their service in one of the country's most sacred and iconic festivals.

== See also ==
- Cetiya
- Relics associated with Buddha
