= U. B. Weerasekera =

Sri Lankan politician

Weerasekara Mudiyanselage Ukku Banda (known as U. B. Weerasekera) was a Sri Lankan politician. He was the member of Parliament of Sri Lanka from Yatinuwara representing the Sri Lanka Freedom Party.

He was elected to parliament from Yatinuwara in the July 1960 general election defeating S. S. Abeysundara.
