= Galgamuwa =

Galgamuwa ගල්ගමුව கல்கமுவ
- Town
- Location within Sri Lanka
- Coordinates: 8°0′0″N 80°16′59″E
- Country: Sri Lanka
- District: Kurunegala

Area
  - Total: 278.4 km^{2} (107.5 sq mi)

Population
  - Total: 63,273
- Time zone: UTC+5:30 (SLST)
- Postal code: 60700
- Area code: 037
- Website: http://www.galgamuwa.ds.gov.lk

Galgamuwa (Sinhala: ගල්ගමුව, Tamil: கல்கமுவ) is a town in Kurunegala District, North Western Province, Sri Lanka. It consists of 62 Grama Niladhari divisions and is situated between the Kala Oya and the Mee Oya Rivers. It borders Ambanpola, Nawagaththegama, Giribawa, Thambuththegama and Ehetuwewa.

In 2012, the town had a total population of 55,078. Galgamuwa is an agricultural area, and cultivation is carried out in both Yala and Maha seasons. There are 35 schools in Galgamuwa.

Religion in Galgamuwa DS Division (2012)
1. Buddhist (91.6%)
2. Hindu (0.32%)
3. Muslim (6.33%)
4. Roman Catholic (1.06%)
5. Other Christian (0.65%)
6. Other (0.00%)
