= D. B. Wijetunga =

President of Sri Lanka from 1993 to 1994

His Excellency Sri Lankabhimanya D. B. Wijetunga
- ඩිංගිරි බණ්ඩා විජේතුංග டிங்கிரி பண்ட விஜேதுங்க

4th President of Sri Lanka
- In office 7 May 1993 – 12 November 1994; Acting: 1–7 May 1993
- Prime Minister: Ranil Wickremesinghe; Chandrika Kumaratunga
- Preceded by: Ranasinghe Premadasa
- Succeeded by: Chandrika Kumaratunga

12th Prime Minister of Sri Lanka
- In office 6 March 1989 – 7 May 1993
- President: Ranasinghe Premadasa
- Preceded by: Ranasinghe Premadasa
- Succeeded by: Ranil Wickremesinghe

Leader of the United National Party
- In office 7 May 1993 – 12 November 1994
- Preceded by: Ranasinghe Premadasa
- Succeeded by: Ranil Wickremesinghe

Personal details
- Born: 15 February 1916 Udunuwara, British Ceylon (now in Sri Lanka)
- Died: 21 September 2008 (aged 92) Kandy, Sri Lanka
- Party: United National Party
- Spouse: Wimalawathi Kumarihami
- Children: Chithrangani Wijetunga

Sri Lankabhimanya Dingiri Banda Wijetunga (Sinhala: ඩිංගිරි බණ්ඩා විජේතුංග; Tamil: டிங்கிரி பண்ட விஜேதுங்க; 15 February 1916 – 21 September 2008) was a Sri Lankan politician who served as the fourth president of Sri Lanka from 7 May 1993 to 12 November 1994, Prime Minister of Sri Lanka from 3 March 1989 to 7 May 1993, and Governor of North Western Province from 1988 to 1989. He was awarded Sri Lankabhimanya, Sri Lanka's highest civilian award, in 1993 by President Ranasinghe Premadasa.

Wijetunga's presidency was marked by Sinhala nationalist rhetoric, a hardline position on the ethnic conflict and a commitment to preserving Sri Lanka's territorial integrity through military action against the LTTE. He rejected the view that the conflict stemmed from ethnic grievances, maintaining that it was fundamentally a problem of terrorism, and opposed negotiations with the LTTE as a route to peace. His administration oversaw the military's recovery of much of the Eastern Province from LTTE control, although Thoppigala remained outside government control. Domestically, his tenure saw the erosion of the United National Party's electoral dominance that had lasted for 17 years and the emergence of the People's Alliance and Chandrika Kumaratunga as a major political challenger. Following the PA's victory in the 1994 general election, Wijetunga appointed Kumaratunga as Prime Minister and despite remaining President until the end of his term, largely refrained from exercising executive authority.

== Early life and education ==
Wijetunga was born on 15 February 1916 to Wijethunga Mudiyanselage Delgahapitiya Arachchila and his wife Manamperi Mudiyanselage Palingumanike Manamperi, as the eldest child in a middle-class Kandyan Govigama Sinhala Buddhist family living on the outskirts of the then-Udunuwara parliamentary seat in the Kandy District of the Central Province of Sri Lanka. Wijetunga completed his primary education at Waligalla Central College and transferred to St Andrew's College in Gampola shortly after.

== Early career ==
After completing his schooling, Wijetunga joined the Ceylon Police as a constable in 1939 and served in Borella, Fort and Maradana before leaving service in 1942. He subsequently served in the Co-operative Department as a Co-operative Inspector from 1947 to 1959.

== Political career ==
Wijetunga was closely associated with veteran politicians including George E. de Silva and A. Ratnayaka. Ratnayake, who was then Minister of Food and Co-operatives in the D. S. Senanayake cabinet, took Wijetunga in as his private secretary.

Wijetunga joined the United National Party in 1946 and unsuccessfully contested the Kadugannawa electorate in the 1956 general election, the Yatinuwara electorate in the March 1960 general election and the Udunuwara electorate in the July 1960 general election. He entered parliament for the first time when he successfully contested the Udunuwara electorate in the 1965 general election.

He lost the Udunuwara electorate in 1970, but returned to parliament in the 1977 general election which saw a massive landslide for the UNP. Wijetunga was subsequently appointed as Cabinet Minister of Information and Broadcasting in the Jayewardene cabinet. Throughout Jayawardene's presidency, Wijetunga functioned in various ministerial capacities holding the portfolios of Posts and Telecommunication, Power, Highways and Agricultural Development.

He served briefly as the governor of North Western Province in 1988 before returning to parliamentary politics a few months later. In the 1989 general election, he secured the largest number of preferential votes in the Kandy District.

=== Prime Minister (1989–1993) ===
Wijetunga was surprisingly appointed as prime minister in 1989 by president Ranasinghe Premadasa. He also held the Ministries of Finance and Labour and Vocational Training in addition to being the state minister of defence in the Premadasa administration.

Lalith Athulathmudali was shot dead in April 1993 while campaigning for the provincial council elections. The killing provoked widespread protests against the government and allegations were hurled at the president for complicity in the assassination. A week later, president Premadasa was also assassinated in Colombo at a May Day rally in a suicide bombing widely considered to be an act of the Liberation Tigers of Tamil Eelam. Wijetunga became acting president until parliament convened to elect a successor to the president Premadasa under the terms of the Constitution.

Wijetunga was unanimously elected by Parliament to complete the remainder of Premadasa's term and was sworn in as the third executive president of Sri Lanka on 7 May 1993.

=== Presidency (1993–1994) ===
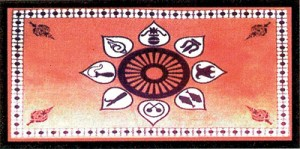
Presidential Standard of Dingiri Banda Wijetunga

Wijetunga appointed Ranil Wickremesinghe as his prime minister, a close relative of former president Jayawardene. Wijetunga's presidency coincided with the rise of Chandrika Kumaratunga within the ranks of the Sri Lanka Freedom Party, and her coalition, the People's Alliance (PA) as the main opposition party.

Wijetunga did not believe that peace could be achieved by negotiating with the LTTE. The Eastern Province was liberated from the LTTE during his tenure except for Thoppigala.

==== 1994 Southern Provincial Council Election ====
During the 1994 Southern Provincial Council election campaign, Wijetunga adopted a strategy centred on defending the UNP's record in government and emphasising the advantages of retaining the party in control of provincial administration. Political analyst Jayadeva Uyangoda identified four principal elements of the UNP's campaign: projecting the party as an experienced and established governing force after 17 consecutive years in office; arguing that electing an opposition administration would be ineffective while the central government remained under UNP control; announcing new development projects for the Southern Province; and appealing to Sinhala nationalist sentiment.

Wijetunga personally reinforced the argument over central government control, asking voters, "The spoon is in our hands. How can the PA deliver the goods?" He also declared that he would not permit a parallel government to operate in any part of the country, reflecting his opposition to provincial administrations controlled by rival political parties. The UNP simultaneously announced development initiatives, including the expansion of Galle Harbour, the extension of the railway line beyond Matara and the provision of electricity to rural communities.

Wijetunga also personally incorporated Sinhala nationalist themes into the UNP's election campaign, presenting the party as the defender of the country's territorial integrity against the separatist demands of the LTTE. In the final week of the campaign, posters bearing his photograph appeared across the Southern Province with the slogan, "I shall be reborn in Sri Lanka to defeat the Eelam claim and save the motherland." According to Uyangoda, the campaign sought to portray Wijetunga as the defender of the Sinhala nation and to mobilise Sinhala nationalist sentiment among the electorate.

Despite the UNP's extensive campaign and Wijetunga's personal involvement, the People's Alliance won the election decisively on 24 March 1994, securing 32 of the 55 seats in the Southern Provincial Council, compared with 23 for the UNP.

==== 1994 General Election ====
On 24 June 1994, Wijetunga dissolved Parliament and called a general election approximately six months ahead of schedule. The decision came amid a series of defections from opposition parties to the UNP, including that of Anura Bandaranaike in 1993, the SLFP's then National Organiser and son of former Prime Minister Sirimavo Bandaranaike. Six additional SLFP parliamentarians crossed over to the UNP shortly before the dissolution. Wijetunga had also facilitated the return to the party of several prominent former members, including Gamini Dissanayake and Ronnie de Mel, despite opposition from sections of the UNP. The decision to bring forward the election followed the PA's victories in the 1993 and March 1994 provincial council elections. The Southern Provincial Council result, in particular, had demonstrated the PA's growing electoral strength. Wijetunga's decision to call an early general election was widely interpreted as an attempt to capitalise on the recent defections and prevent the PA from consolidating its electoral gains and building further momentum ahead of a national contest. Contemporary reporting described the dissolution as a major political gamble that had taken both the opposition and sections of the governing party by surprise.

Wijetunga's hardline nationalist position on the ethnic conflict also became an issue during the election campaign. His repeated assertion that "there is no ethnic problem in Sri Lanka, only a terrorist problem" attracted criticism and was cited as a factor undermining the UNP's traditional support among minority communities. In an effort to strengthen the party's position among the Indian Tamil electorate, Wijetunga subsequently entered into an electoral agreement with the leader of the Ceylon Workers' Congress (CWC), S. Thondaman. Under the arrangement, CWC candidates would contest the parliamentary election under the UNP's electoral symbol.

Despite these moves, the UNP saw a major defeat to the People's Alliance in the 1994 general election and Wijetunga appointed Kumaratunga as prime minister. Even though under the constitution Wijetunga was still the head of state and executive president, he chose not to exercise much authority, letting Prime Minister Kumaratunga manage the affairs of the country.

==== 1994 Presidential Election ====
He decided not to contest the 1994 presidential election and appointed Lucky Jayawardena as the party organizer for his former electorate, Udunuwara. He relinquished office in November 1994 after Kumaratunga was elected president in a historic landslide.

== Death ==
Wijetunga died after a prolonged illness around 9.30 am on 21 September 2008 at Kandy General Hospital at 92 years old. He was granted a State funeral as a Privilege of a Former President and a holder of the Sri Lankabhimanya award. His remains lay in repose at his home in Pilimathalawa, before taking to the Parliament Complex on 25 September, to enable all Parliamentarians to pay their last respects. His cremation took place on the Kandy Municipal Council grounds, in Getambe. The Government declared a National Mourning period until 8 October, as a condolence motion bought up by the Parliament.

Government offices
Preceded by Ranasinghe Premadasa	President of Sri Lanka; 1993–1994	Succeeded by Chandrika Kumaratunga
Preceded by Ranasinghe Premadasa	Prime Minister of Sri Lanka; 1989–1993	Succeeded by Ranil Wickremesinghe
Political offices
Preceded by Office created	Governor of the North Western Province; 1988–1989	Succeeded by Montague Jayawickrama
