= Getambe =

Coordinates: 7°16′N 80°37′E

- Village
- Interactive map of Getambe
- Country: Sri Lanka
- Province: Central Province
- Time zone: UTC+5:30 (Sri Lanka Standard Time)

Getambe is a village in Sri Lanka. It is located within Central Province. Getambe has a population of 2.725 people.

== See also ==
- List of towns in Central Province, Sri Lanka
