= Millangoda Raja =

Sri Lankan elephant

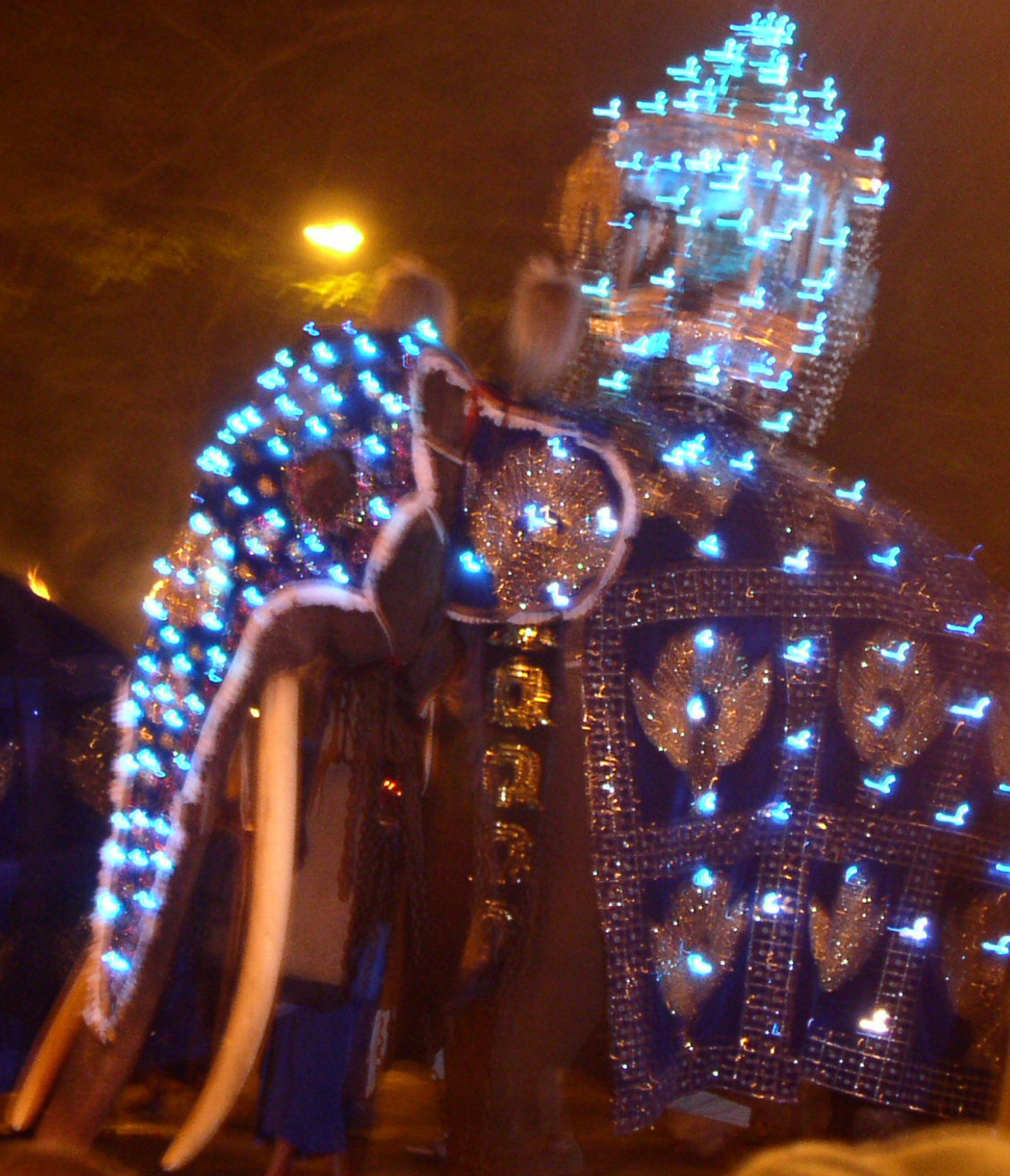

Main casket bearer of the procession of Esala
- Held title 1998–2008
- Preceded by: Heiyantuduwa Raja & Ruwan Raja
- Succeeded by: Nadungamuwa Raja

Personal details
- Born: c. 1938 Ceylon (now Sri Lanka)
- Died: 30 July 2011 (aged 73) Kegalle, Sri Lanka
- Resting place: Elephant Village, Molagoda, Kegalle
- Height: 9 ft (2.7 m) – 10 ft (3.0 m)
- Species: Sri Lankan elephant (Elephas maximus maximus)
- Sex: Male
- Owner: Millangoda family of Molagoda

Millangoda Raja (c. 1938 – 30 July 2011: Sinhala: මිල්ලන්ගොඩ රාජා), also known as Millangoda tusker, was a Sri Lankan elephant. Over 9 feet tall and with 7.5 foot (2.3 meters) long tusks, he was considered to be among the longest tusked captive Asian elephant during his lifetime. ("The longest African elephant tusk measured around 3.5m, the longest woolly mammoth tusk measured around 4m and the longest Asiatic elephant tusk measured around 3m.") The tusker was one of the main casket bearers of the procession of Esala, an annual procession held to pay homage to the Sacred Tooth Relic of Buddha, held in Kandy, Sri Lanka.

== History ==
Raja was captured at a jungle in Nawagaththegama, Anamaduwa, Puttalam District in 1945 when he was six or seven years old. In Raja's herd, nineteen elephants were captured, 15 of them were sold in Anamaduwa Wev Pitiya. Thereafter, he was owned by M. R. A. Millangoda Appuhamy of Molagoda, Kegalle, who owned five six-foot tall, eight year old small elephants, including Millangoda Raja.

Millangoda Raja stood about 9 feet. His tusks were 7 feet 6 inches long. According to the owner, he was gigantic and majestic in appearance and had reportedly never been aggressive except during musth. The tusker was known to have had a fondness for eating jaggery and toffees. Two mahouts have taken care of Raja.

== Perahera procession ==
Millangoda Raja has participated in the Esala Perahera in Kandy for about 40 years. Raja first participated in the Perahera of the Maha Vishnu Devalaya in Kandy. Thereafter he has participated in the Esala Perahera as an elephant in the trunk of the elephant carrying the casket. Raja had the opportunity to carry the casket of the Tooth for about 10-12 years. After the death of the Raja elephant in Kandy, the Millangoda Raja got that opportunity. Raja last visited the Perahera procession in 2008.

== Death ==
Raja's tusks gradually grew longer as he aged, eventually reaching a length that made it difficult for him to move and feed properly. When he lowered his head to eat, his tusks would strike the ground, making it difficult for him to graze. He reportedly suffered from digestive problems for more than a year prior to his death. As elephants age, their teeth gradually wear down and eventually fall out, which can further weaken them and make feeding difficult. According to his handlers, during his illness he was fed foods such as figs, leaves, and jackfruit to help sustain him. It is also reported that the then President, Mahinda Rajapaksa, arranged for nutritional supplements to be provided to the elephant through the Wildlife Department. During the final stage of his life, several saline infusions with vitamins were administered to support his condition. Shortly before his death, Buddhist religious rites were performed, including the chanting of pirith. The Atapirikara was ceremonially shown to the elephant and then presented to Buddhist monks. Following the chanting and the tying of pirith strings, the elephant reportedly greeted the monks with great effort. The tusker died on 30 July 2011 at 12:25 pm and was about 73 years old at the time of his death. Funeral rites were conducted by a group of Buddhist monks. His body was later preserved and placed on public display in a museum constructed by Ananda Millangoda at the Elephant Village in Molagoda, Kegalle.

== See also ==
- List of individual elephants
