= Nadungamuwa Raja =

Indian elephant (1953–2022)

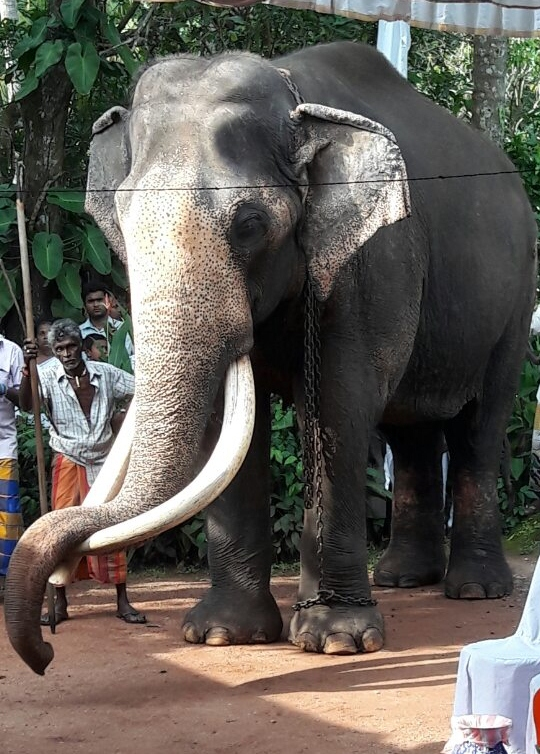

Main casket bearer of the procession of Esala
- Held title 2005–2021
- Preceded by: Ruwan Raja; Millangoda Raja
- Succeeded by: Indi Raja

Personal details
- Born: c. 1953 Mysore, India
- Died: 7 March 2022 (aged 68–69) Weliweriya, Gampaha District, Sri Lanka
- Resting place: Colombo National Museum
- Height: 10.5 ft (3.2 m)
- Occupation: Main casket bearer of the procession of Esala
- Known for: Casket bearer
- Species: Indian elephant (Elephas maximus indicus)
- Sex: Male
- Owner: Dr. Harsha Dharmavijaya

Nadungamuwa Vijaya Raja (Sinhala: නැදුන්ගමුව විජය රාජා, Tamil: நெதுன்கமுவ விஜய ராஜா), simply Nadungamuwa Raja (c. 1953 – 7 March 2022), was an Indian elephant used as a ceremonial tusker in Sri Lanka.

From 2005 to 2021, he was the main Casket bearer of the Kandy Esala Perahera, an annual procession held to pay homage to the Sacred Tooth Relic of Buddha, held in Kandy, Sri Lanka. One of the most celebrated elephants in Asia during his lifetime, Nadungamuwa Raja was one of the largest tame elephants in Asia.

Following Nadungamuwe Raja's death, the then Sri Lankan President Gotabaya Rajapaksa declared Raja a national treasure, in recognition of his valuable services to the religion and culture of Sri Lanka.

== History ==
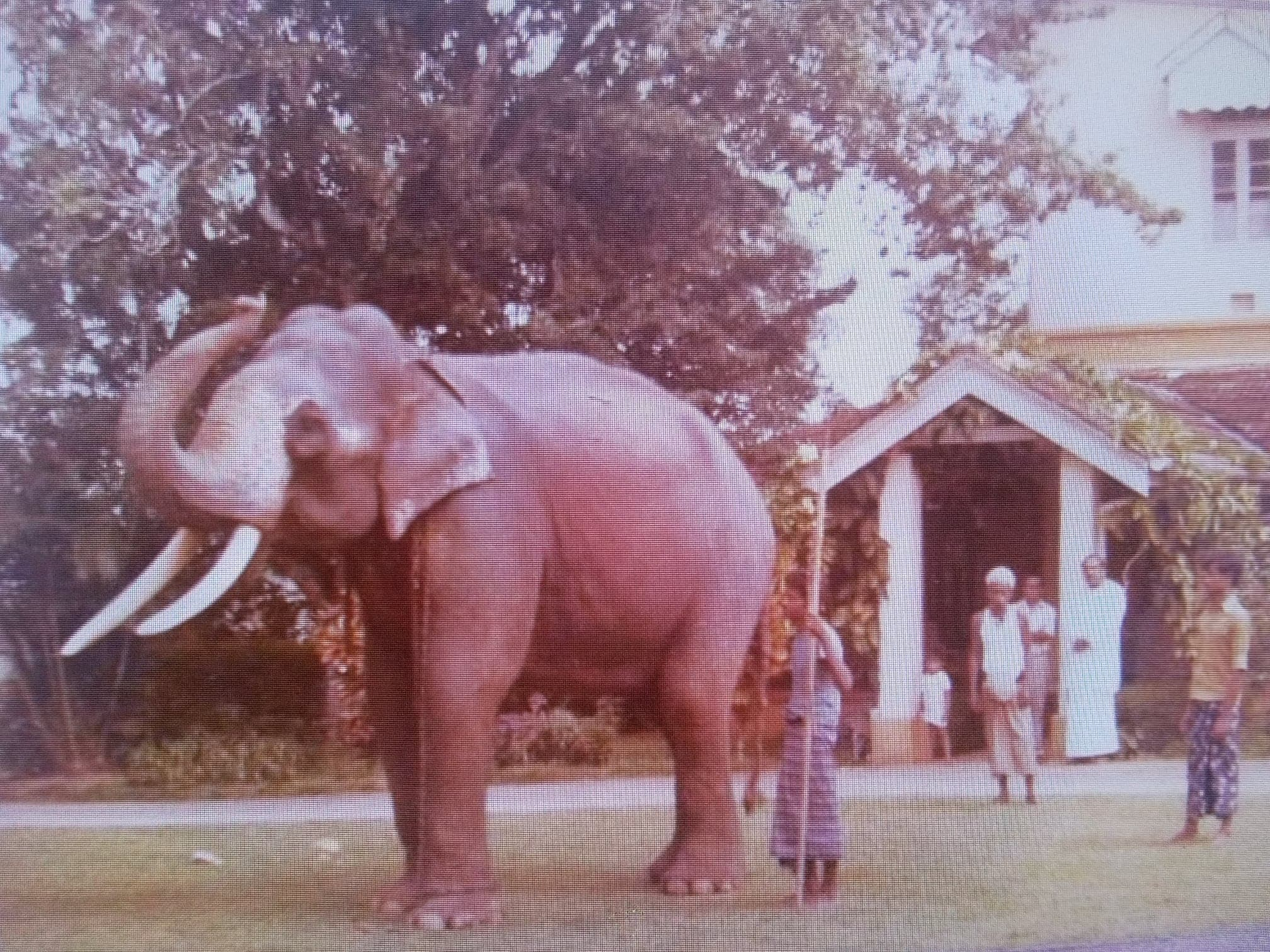
Nagungamua Raja saying goodbye to his second owner in 1978.

Raja was born c. 1953 in Mysore, India. The village of Nadungamuwa has been home to temple elephants since 1917, when Livnis Perera, the grandfather of Raja's final owner, Harsha Dharmavijaya, bought an elephant in order to take his younger brother in a procession to the Balummahara Godagedara Pirivena, Perera. That elephant was the first in the Nadungamuwa elephant lineage. The village of Nadungamuwa celebrated the centenary of the lineage in 2018 with Raja, who was considered to be the most important elephant in the country.

In 1978, when Raja was 25 years old, he was acquired from his second owner, Herbert Wickramasinghe, a former parliamentarian from Bandaragama, for Rs. 75,000. His new owner was Dharmavijaya Veda Ralahamy, an eminent Ayurvedic physician. After the death of Ralahamy, the elephant was looked after by his son, Harsha Dharmavijaya, also an Ayurvedic doctor. Raja was attended by four mahouts over his lifetime: Seaman, Soma, Simon, and finally Wilson Kodithuwakku, known locally as "Kalu Mama", who cared for Raja for more than 15 years.

== Perahera procession ==
Before participating in the Kandy Esala Perahera, Raja continually participated in many perahera festivals in Gampaha and Colombo and joined the procession of the Sabaragamuwa Maha Saman Devalaya in 1985. In 2005, at age 52, Raja joined the Kandy Esala Perahera by request of Pradeep Nilanga Dela, who is the Diyawadana Nilame of Sri Dalada Maligawa. Raja went on to participate in the Kandy Esala Perahera for more than a decade.

On all these occasions the elephant travelled to Kandy on foot, covering a distance of about 90 km from Weliweriya, Gampaha to Kandy. Due to a road accident in 2016, the government provided military protection to the elephant when it arrived in Kandy. Raja always left the Nedungamuwa Palace after the monks' and employers' worship by sprinkling Pirith and tying Pirith strings. The relics casket was carried 13 times by the tusker during the Dalada Perahera, the last time being in 2021.

== Death ==
Nadungamuwa Raja died on 7 March 2022, believed to be 68 or 69, following a brief illness. Raja was posthumously honoured as a national treasure and given full state honours. The President of Sri Lanka Gotabaya Rajapaksa directed that Raja's body be preserved as a stuffed body.

== Legacy ==
A postage stamp of Rs. 15 and a first day cover were issued on 30 December 2019 in appreciation of the elephant's religious and cultural mission. After the chanting of the Pirith by the Mahanayake Theras, the first day cover was released. The 2354 First Day Cover Issue was the second occasion for the release of an elephant stamp and first day cover.

== Preservation and public display ==
After the demise of Nadungamuwa Raja on 7 March 2022, the government decided to preserve its body due to its cultural and religious importance. After completing the Buddhist funeral rites, the body was handed over to the Department of National Museums with the permission of the custodian of the elephant, Dr. Harsha Dharmavijaya, and on the request of the Diyawadana Nilame of the Temple of the Sacred Tooth Relic. The body was reconstructed by the Zoology Division and Exhibition Design Unit of the Department of National Museums through taxidermy methods. The skin of the elephant has been treated and placed on a specially constructed structure to resemble its original form. The cost incurred on reconstructing the elephant is around LKR 7 million. Additionally, a specially designed glass chamber to display the reconstructed body has been built for around LKR 16 million. The reconstructed body was officially inaugurated on 10 March 2026 and opened to public viewing on 11 March 2026 at the Natural History Museum located within the premises of the Colombo National Museum.

== See also ==
- Heiyantuduwa Raja (elephant)
- List of individual elephants
- Millangoda Raja
- Raja (elephant)
