= Raja (elephant) =

Holy Tusker of Temple of the Tooth

Maligawa Raja
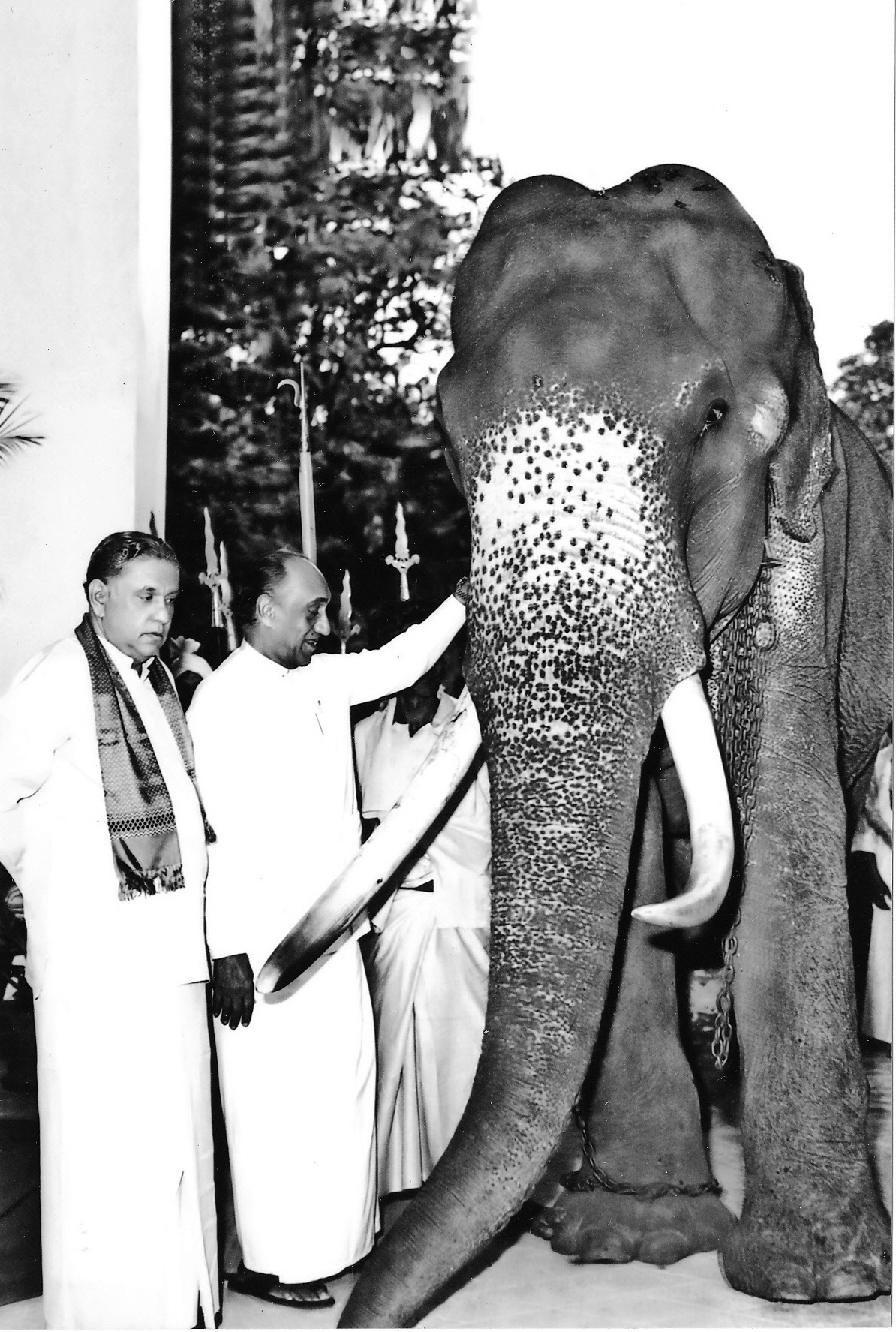
- Diyawadana Nilame of Sri Dalada Maligawa Nissanka Wijeyeratne & President of Sri Lanka J. R. Jayewardene with 'Raja' tusker in Mid 1983 Kandy, Sri Lanka
- Species: Sri Lankan Elephant
- Sex: Male
- Born: c. 1913; Eravur, Sri Lanka
- Died: 16 July 1988 (aged 75); Kandy, Sri Lanka
- Resting place: Raja Tusker Museum
- Notable role: Main casket bearer of the procession of Esala
- Years active: 1937 - 1987
- Predecessor: Dhanthaloota
- Successor: Saman Raja (Wijedantha); Heiyantuduwa Raja
- Owner: Sri Dalada Maligawa

Raja (Sinhala: රාජා ඇතා - Raja Atha) (also known as Maligawa Raja, c. 1913 - 16 July 1988) was a Sri Lankan tusker elephant belonging to the Sri Dalada Maligawa temple in Kandy. Raja participated at the annual Esala procession in Kandy for around 50 years and was the sacred casket bearer of the final Randoli perehera for 37 years. He was one of the most celebrated elephants in Asia during his lifetime, and was world famous for his noble behavior. On 20 August 1986 former Sri Lankan President J. R. Jayewardene declared Raja as a national treasure, in recognition of his valuable services to the religion and culture of Sri Lanka.

== Early years ==
It is believed that Raja was born in the jungles of Eravur in Batticaloa District circa 1913. He was captured by a group of men headed by Umaru Lebbe Panikkar in November 1925. Panikkar is a name given to the men who mastered capturing elephants in the eastern parts of the country. The young elephant Raja had been purchased by Tikiribanda Mampitiya Disawe of Giragama Walauwa in Kandy for 3300 rupees, a huge sum at that time, along with another young elephant named Skanda. With a permit issued by the British government, both the elephants were brought by train to the Kadugannawa railway station and then to the Giragama Walauwa on 11 December 1925. Arambegama Kirihamy was appointed as the mahout of the young elephants. He attached the young elephants to the female elephant he was looking after, who became the foster mother of young elephants.

When the two elephants were around 24 years old, they were ceremonially gifted to the Sri Dalada Maligawa. A deed of transfer was drawn up and gifted to the Diyawadana Nilame by Mampitiya Dissawa on 22 August 1937. The Diyawadana Nilame of the Temple of the Tooth, at that time was T. B.Ratwatte. Authorities of Sri Dalada Maligawa were happy about this new elephant who not only had all the physical requirements, but also showed much promise. Thereafter both Raja and Skanda were trained for the responsibilities of the temple elephants and were given the experience of participating in the procession, in the same year.

== Noble tusker ==
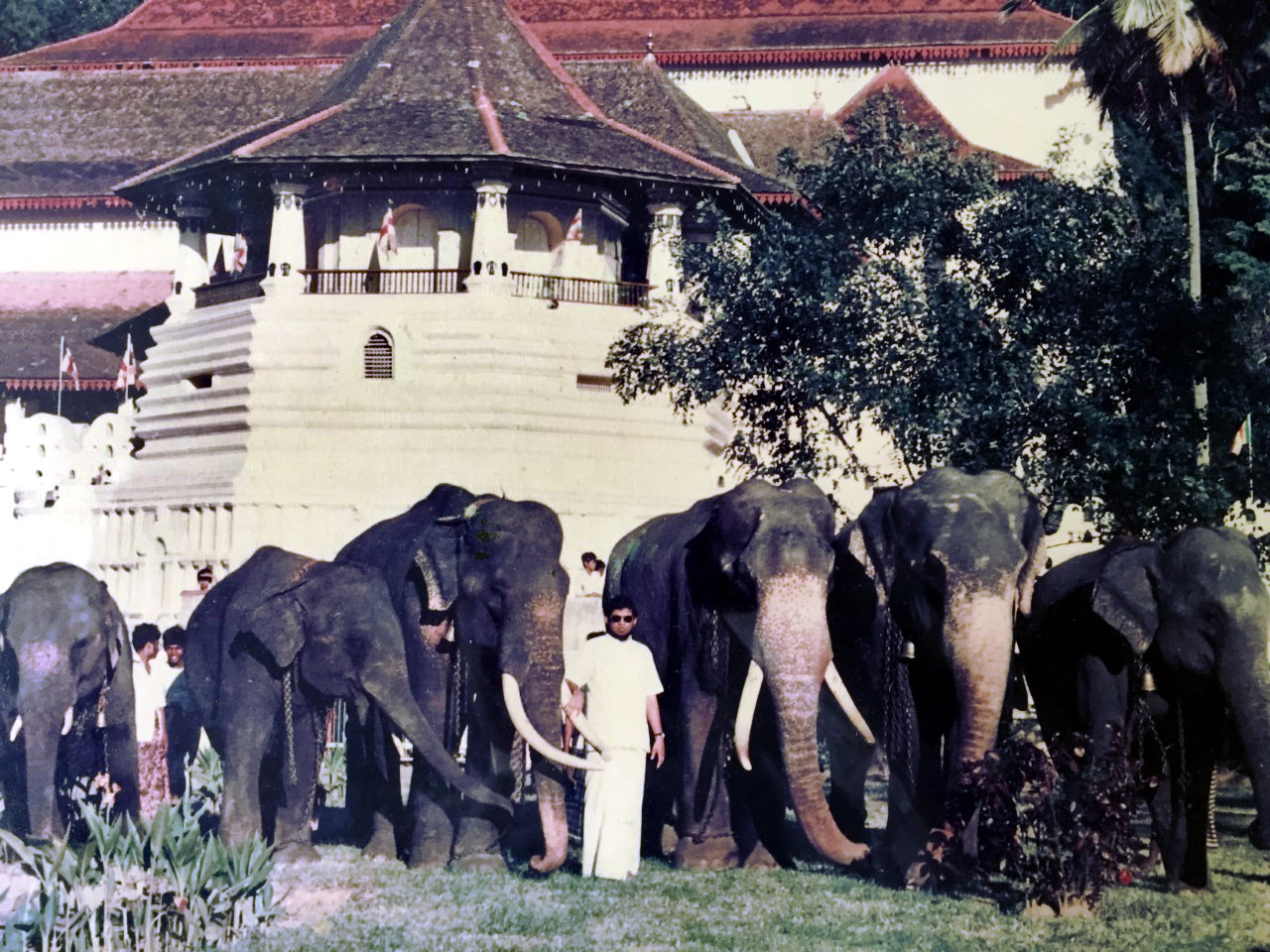
Diyawadana Nilame Neranjan Wijeyeratne with the Sri Dalada Maligawa elephants Raja, Skanda, Jaya Raja & a few more

Raja possessed the rare Maha Gaja Lakshana physical characteristics that put him in the aristocratic caste of Sri Lankan elephants, Chaddhantha. After observing the great physical characteristics of the elephant and his obedient behavior, Raja was given the responsibility of carrying the sacred casket at the Esala Perahehra in 1950. Raja by then, had been fully trained and satisfied the authorities about its capabilities. He fulfilled his duties satisfactorily during the initial years, which cemented his place as the chief elephant of the procession for years to come. Raja never had any problems with his mahouts and was very obedient to them. He always respected Buddhist priests and also liked to be in the premises of the Sri Dalada Maligawa.

Raja on Rs. 1,000 Sri Lankan Rupee bank notes

Most of the times Raja carried the sacred casket at the annual perahera in Kandy flanked by Skanda and another tusker elephant. Sometimes Skanda too carried the casket, but Raja was the casket bearer of the important final Randoli perehera. Even after the demise of Skanda, the fellow tusker elephant in 1986, Raja continued his responsibilities as the chief tusker of the Esala procession in 1987. After serving Buddhist processions for about 50 years, Raja died in July 1988 due to an illness and his death prompted the government to order a day of national mourning in Sri Lanka. A postage stamp was issued in its memory on 12 December 1989, and also the 1,000 Rupee bill, with Raja and the Muslim trainer Umar Lebbe Panicker from Eravur in Batticola.

== Raja's Museum ==
Raja's stuffed remains are presently kept in a special museum within the grounds of the Temple of the Tooth. The museum is a special attraction to the hundreds of people who visit the temple of the Tooth Relic daily.

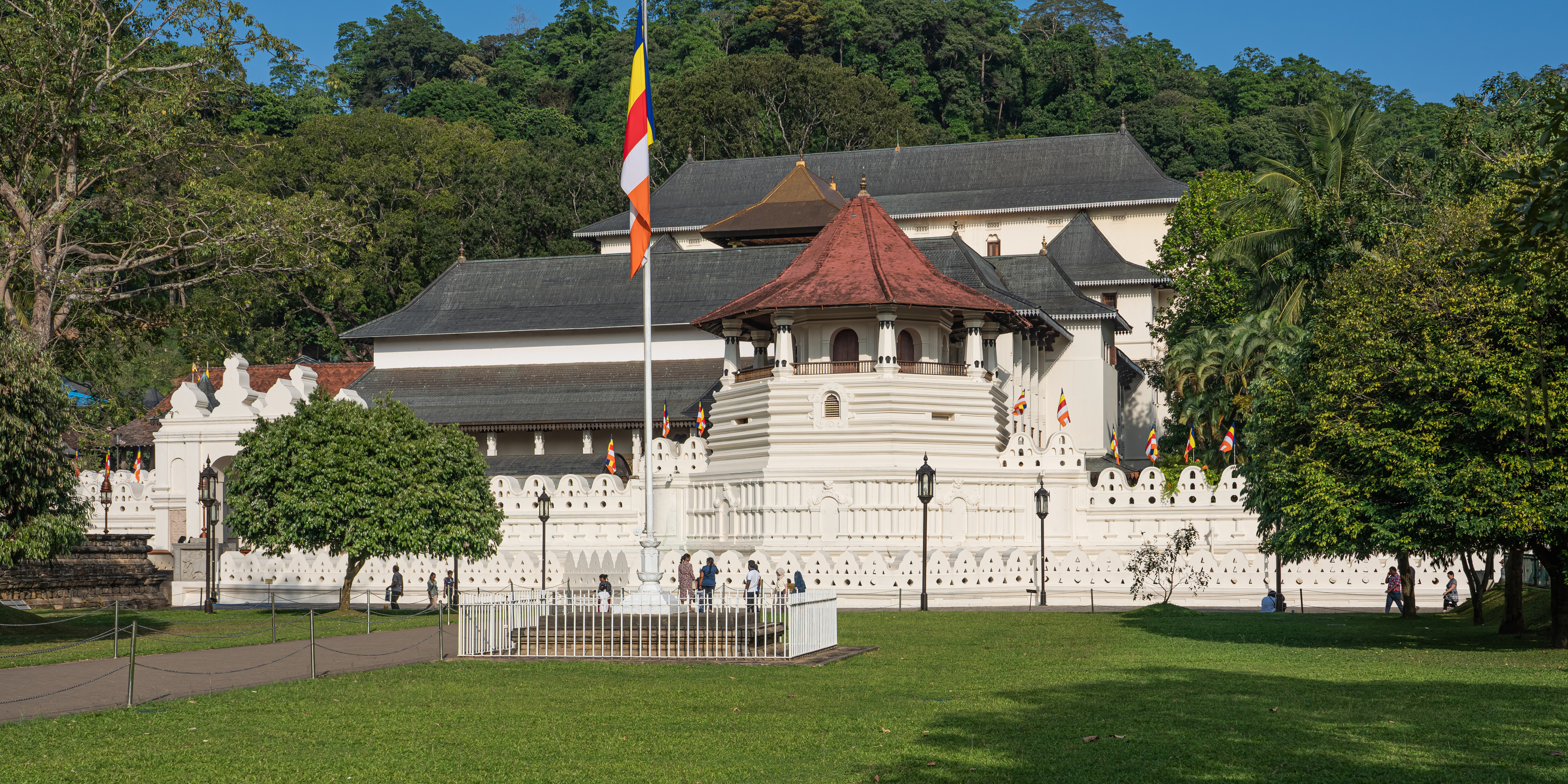
Sri Dalada Maligawa, Kandy, Sri Lanka.

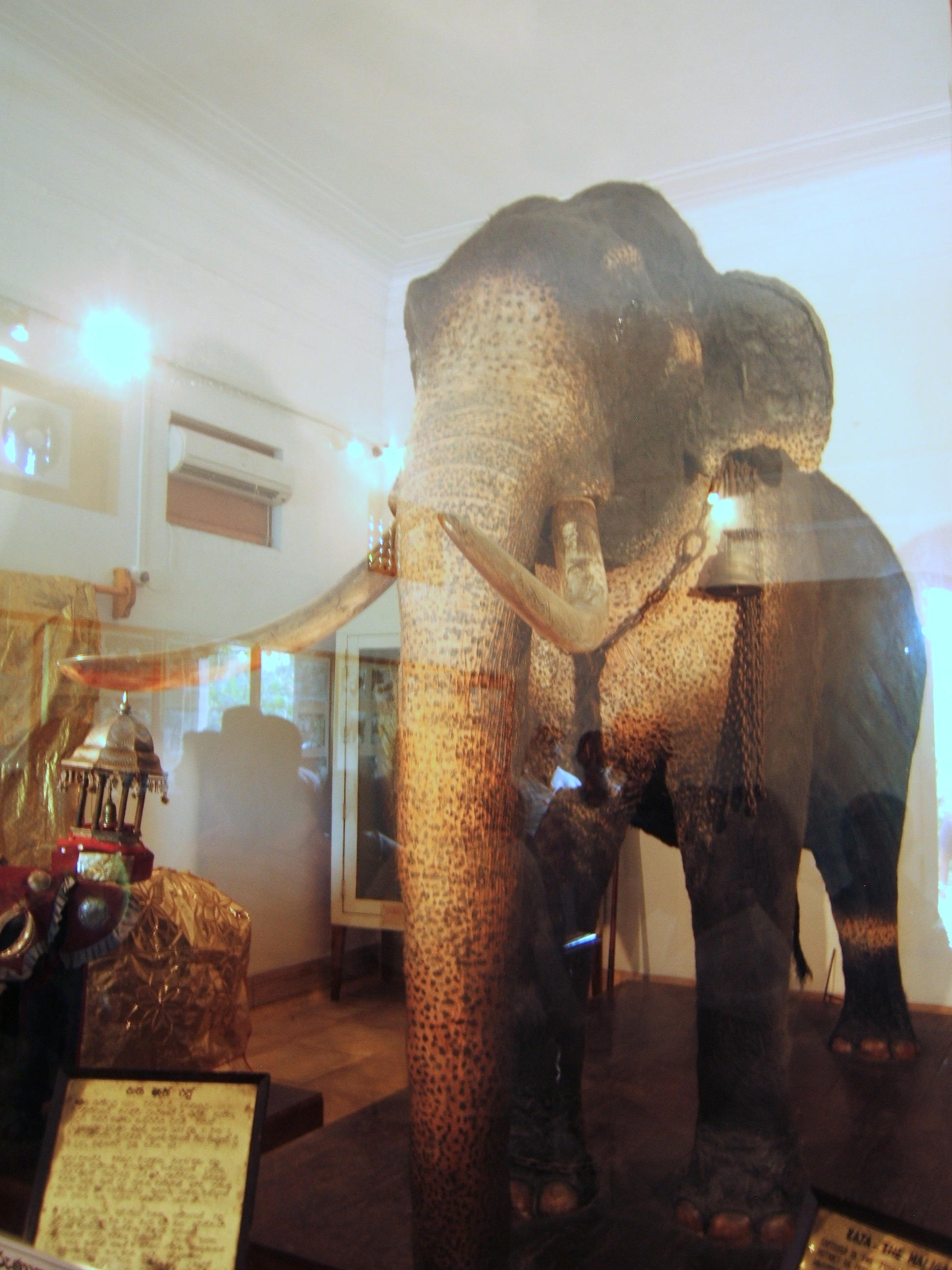
Raja's museum.

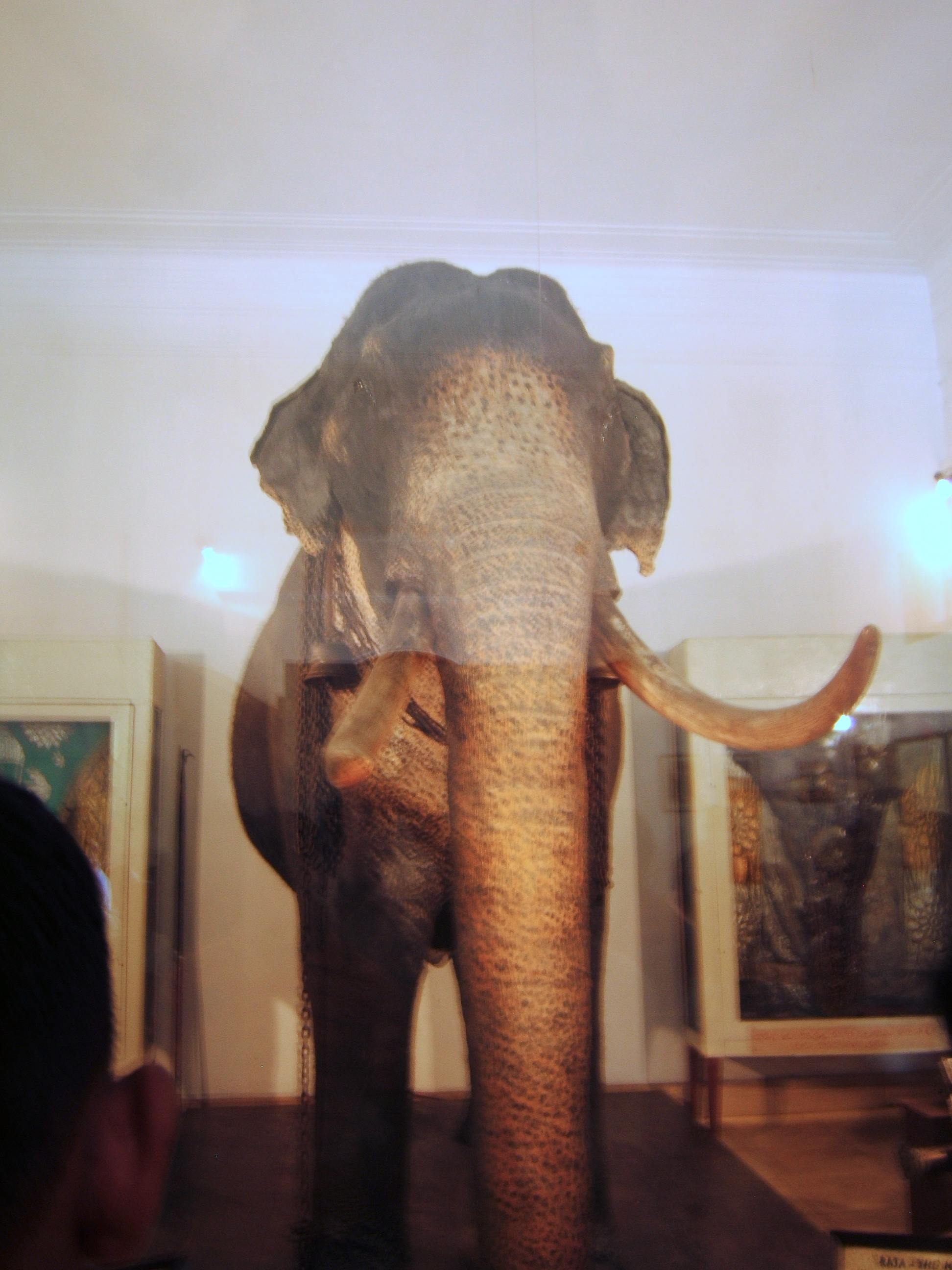
Raja's stuffed remains.

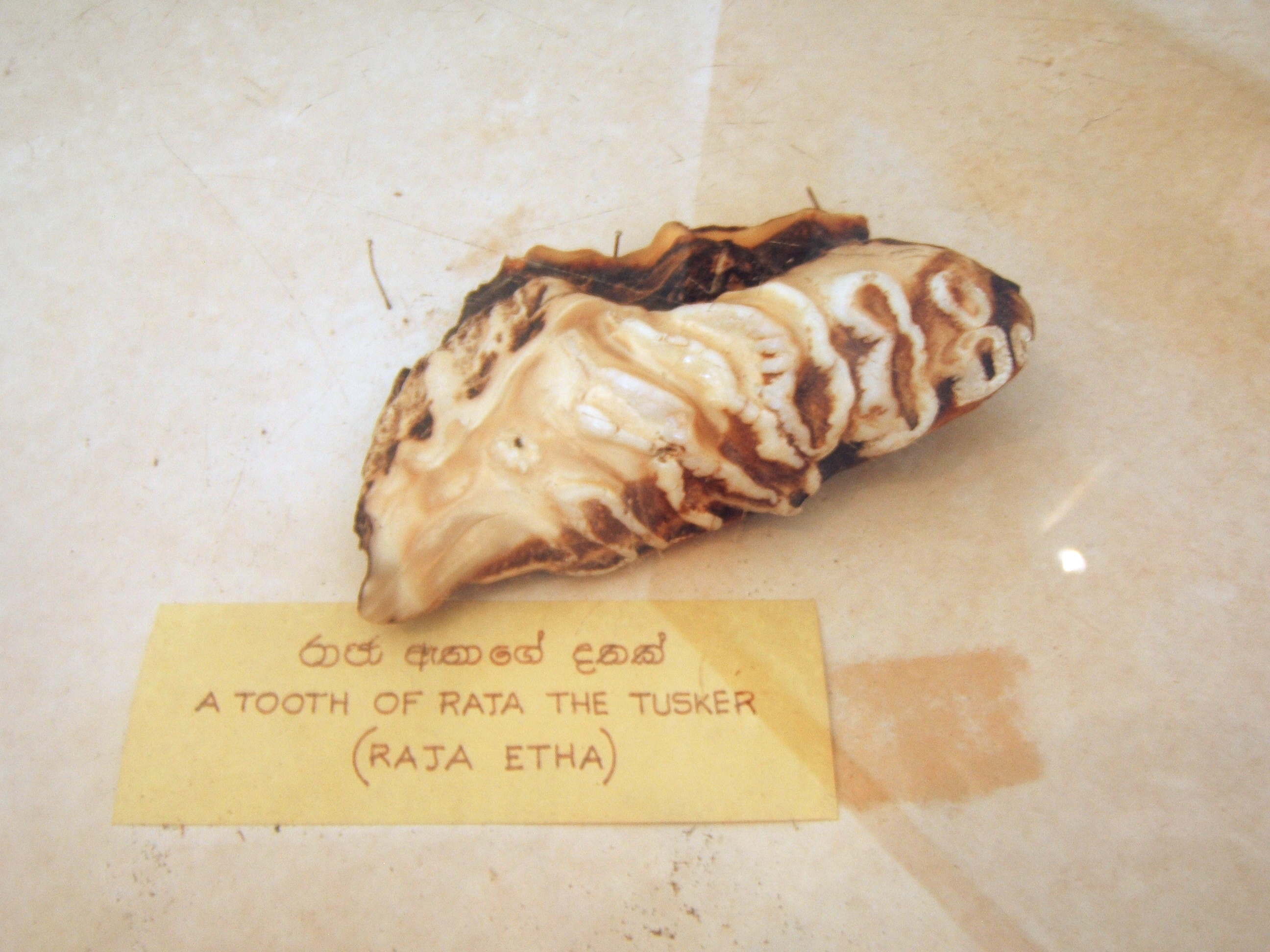
A tooth of Raja.

== See also ==
- Heiyantuduwa Raja
- Millangoda Raja
- Nadungamuwa Raja
- List of individual elephants
