= Herbert Sri Nissanka =

Ceylonese lawyer and legislator

Hon. Herbert Sri Nissanka QC

Member of the Ceylon Parliament for Kurunegala
- In office 1947–1952
- Preceded by: seat created
- Succeeded by: Dingiri Bandara Welagedara

Personal details
- Born: 7 December 1898
- Died: 26 February 1954 (aged 55)
- Party: Sri Lanka Freedom Party
- Other political affiliations: Lanka Sama Samaja Party
- Education: St Edmund Hall, Oxford; Royal College, Colombo; Ananda College
- Occupation: Advocate
- Profession: Barrister

Herbert Sri Nissanka, QC (also known as Nissanka Herbert Mendis) (7 December 1898 – 26 February 1954) was a Ceylonese lawyer and legislator. Elected to the first post-independence parliament, he was one of the founding members of the Sri Lanka Freedom Party.

== Early life and education ==
Born Nissanka Herbert Mendis on 17 January 1898 at his maternal grandparent's home, Garumuni Walawwa in Balapitiya, to Anoma Wickramaratne De Zoysa and Nissanka Diveris Mendis, a clerk in the Ceylon Government Railway. His uncles Robert De Zoysa, Arthur De Zoysa and Ian De Zoysa were members of the State Council of Ceylon. Sri Nissanka was educated at Ananda College, Colombo and at the Royal College Colombo. He entered Ceylon Law College, before proceeding to St Edmund Hall, Oxford in 1919 where he obtained his Bachelor of Arts degree, following which he studied law and was called to the bar at Middle Temple as a barrister. He was contemporary of S. W. R. D. Bandaranaike at Oxford and was a member of the debating team.

== Legal career ==
On his return to Ceylon, he took oaths as an advocate and began his legal practice in the Colombo unofficial bar in 1923, with his first appearance in court before Sir Thomas De Sampayo, KC as a junior to E. W. Jayewardene, KC. He went on to develop a reputed practice in criminal law. He was a commissioned as second lieutenant in the Ceylon Light Infantry in 1928, but resigned his commission on a matter of principle after R. L. Pereira, KC was barred from the King's House by the British administration. Sri Nissanka was the Member of the Board of Appeal of the Rubber Commissioner's Department (1938) and a member of the Archeological Commission. He was appointed a King's Counsel in 1944.

== Political career ==
Sri Nissanka entered politics having been elected to the Colombo Municipal Council in January 1944. He served as a municipal councilor until December 1946. He contested the 1947 general election as an independent candidate from Kurunegala and was elected to the first Parliament. Following the election, Sri Nissanka and 42 parliamentarians pledge their support to S. W. R. D. Bandaranaike to form a government as prime minister, which Bandaranaike turned down. However, in July 1951, Bandaranaike resigned from his government posts and crossed the floor to the opposition. Sri Nissanka lead the formation of Bandaranaike's new party the Sri Lanka Freedom Party (SLFP) having its inaugural meeting at Town Hall on 2 September 1951. He contested the 1952 general election from Kurunegala as an independent candidate, but was defeated by Dingiri Bandara Welagedara from the United National Party. He died on 26 February 1954.

== Social service ==
Nissanka was a founder of the Salagala Monastery (1936), the Biyagama Monastery and headed the 1936 Ceylon Delegation to the Pan Pacific Conference of Buddhist Associations held in Tokyo. He was also the President, Dumb Friends League and Honorary Counsel to the Society for the Prevention of Cruelty to Animals.

== Family ==
He married Muriel Spurling Christoffelz. They had three children, including Manil Yamuna Devi.
