= Weerasinghe de Silva =

Sri Lankan politician (1935–2006)

Hon. Weerasinghe de Silva

Member of Parliament

Member of Parliament for Balapitiya
- In office 1970–1977
- Preceded by: L. C. de Silva
- Succeeded by: Norman Waidyaratna

Personal details
- Born: Pettagan Dedreck Weerasingha de Silva; 21 January 1935 Balapitiya, Sri Lanka
- Died: November 2006 Colombo, Sri Lanka
- Party: Lanka Sama Samaja Party
- Education: Siddharta Maha Vidyalaya, Balapitiya; Nalanda College Colombo
- Occupation: Politics
- Profession: Lawyer

Pettagan Dedreck Weerasingha de Silva (21 January 1935 – November 2006) was a Sri Lankan politician and a former MP who represented the seat of Balapitiya.

De Silva was the nephew of Dr. Colvin R. de Silva, his younger brother was Asoka Weerasinghe de Silva and his brother-in-law was Sarath Muthetuwegama.

He was educated at Siddharta Maha Vidyalaya Balapitiya for primary education and then received secondary education from Nalanda College Colombo before entering the Law College, where he passed out as a Senior Counselor.

At the 1970 general parliamentary elections he successfully contested the seat of Balapitiya, as part of the United Front, winning by over 8,000 votes. At the next parliamentary elections in 1977 he was defeated by almost 9,000 votes by the United National Party's candidate, Norman Waidyaratna.
