= Lakshman de Silva =

Ceylonese politician

Ruwanpura Lakshman de Silva (born 15 October 1916) was a Ceylonese politician.

At the 4th parliamentary election, held on 19 March 1960, de Silva ran as the Sri Lanka Freedom Party candidate in the newly created electorate of Balapitiya. He polled 8,465 votes (33% of the total vote), 647 votes ahead of the Lanka Sama Samaja Party candidate, L. C. de Silva, and 2,230 votes ahead of the United National Party candidate, Ian de Zoysa. The election results however left neither of Ceylon's two major parties with a majority, with the result being the calling of another election. He was subsequently re-elected at the 5th parliamentary election held on 20 July 1960. This time receiving 13,812 votes (55% of the total vote) and 2,971 votes ahead of the United National Party candidate, V. T. de Zoysa. On the 3 December 1964 Lakshman was one of thirteen SLFP members who crossed the floor with the deputy leader, Charles Percival de Silva, to defeat the Sirimavo Bandaranaike government's throne speech, to nationalise the press, which led to the government calling for fresh elections.

At the ensuing 6th parliamentary election, held on 22 March 1965, he contested the seat of Balapitiya as the candidate for the Sri Lanka Freedom Socialist Party (SLFSP). The United National Party having formed a coalition with the SLFSP didn't run a candidate in the electorate, neither did the Sri Lanka Freedom Party. De Silva received 16,519 votes (49% of the total vote) but was defeated 96 votes by the Lanka Sama Samaja Party candidate, Lokuge Chandradasa de Silva. In December 1967 Lokuge de Silva was unseated on the ground that he had a contract with government. A by-election for the seat was subsequently held on 17 December 1968 for the electorate, where de Silva, representing the United National Party was re-elected, defeating the Lanka Sama Samara Party candidate, Weerasinghe de Silva, by 1,530 votes.

At the 1970 general parliamentary elections de Silva was defeated by Weerasinghe de Silva, who ran as part of the United Front, winning the seat by over 8,000 votes. At the 8th parliamentary election held on 21 July 1977, de Silva failed to obtain the nomination of the United National Party and therefore ran as an independent. He was unsuccessful in his bid to get re-elected, polling 4,556 votes (16.4% of the total votes), falling short of the United National Party candidate, Norman Waidyaratna, by 11,189 votes.
