= Neal de Alwis =

Ceylonese politician (born 1914)

Hon. Neal de Alwis

Deputy Minister of Finance
- In office 1 October 1975 – 4 February 1977
- Preceded by: Nanediri Wimalasena
- Succeeded by: Festus Perera

Deputy Minister of Public Administration, Local Government and Home Affairs
- In office September 1970 – 1975

Member of the Ceylon Parliament for Udugama
- In office 1952–1956
- Preceded by: D. S. Goonesekera
- Succeeded by: Udugama

Member of the Ceylon Parliament for Baddegama electorate
- In office March 1960 – 1977
- Preceded by: Henry Abeywickrema
- Succeeded by: E. D. Wickrematilaka

Personal details
- Born: 19 January 1914 Galle, Ceylon
- Party: Lanka Sama Samaja Party
- Profession: politician

William Neal de Alwis (born 19 January 1914) was a Ceylonese politician and a senior member of the Lanka Sama Samaja Party.

William Neal de Alwis was born on 19 January 1914, and he received his education at Newstead Girls' School, Negombo, All Saints College, Galle and St. Joseph's College, Colombo.

At the 1st parliamentary election, held between 23 August 1947 and 20 September 1947, he ran as the LSSP candidate in the Udugama electorate. He failed to get elected losing by 5,464 votes to the United National Party candidate, D. S. Goonesekera. At the 2nd parliamentary election, held between 24 May 1952 and 30 May 1952, he successfully contested the seat of Udugama, securing 43% of the total vote, defeating Goonesekera by 2,735 votes. He was unable to retain the electorate at the 3rd parliamentary election held between 5 April 1956 and 10 April 1956, where he lost to Goonesekera, who represented the newly formed Sri Lanka Freedom Party, by 2,311 votes.

At the 4th parliamentary election, held on 19 March 1960, he ran as the LSSP candidate in the Baddegama electorate. Whilst de Alwis only received less than 20% of the total vote, out of a field of nine candidates, it was sufficient for him to secure the seat and re-enter parliament. At the subsequent parliamentary elections held on 20 July 1960 he retained the seat with an increased majority, receiving 11,692 votes (49% of the total vote).

On 27 January 1962, officers of the Army and Police attempted a coup d'état aimed at overthrowing the government of Prime Minister Sirimavo Bandaranaike. The key leaders were arrested before the coup was carried out however not before the first and only arrest of the coup occurred, with de Alwis was arrested at his residence at 9.30pm and detained for nine hours in Police custody.

At the 1970 parliamentary election, held in May, de Alwis was re-elected to Baddegama, with 22,126 votes (57.5% of the total vote). In 1968 the LSSP formed a political alliance, the United Front, with the Sri Lanka Freedom Party (SLFP) and the Communist Party of Sri Lanka (CPSL), with the United Front successfully winning the 1970 parliamentary election. In September 1970 de Alwis was appointed Deputy Minister of Public Administration, Local Government and Home Affairs.

On 1 October 1975 de Alwis was appointed as Deputy Minister of Finance as part of the Second Sirimavo Bandaranaike cabinet, a position he retained until February 1977.

At the 8th parliamentary election held on 21 July 1977, de Alwis switched allegiance to the Sri Lanka Freedom Party, however he failed to get re-elected, and was defeated at the polls by the UNP candidate, E. D. Wickrematilaka, who received 23,375 votes (52% of the total vote) as opposed to de Alwis’ 17,778 votes (39.5% of the total vote).
