= Balapitiya Electoral District =

Former electoral district of Sri Lanka

Balapitiya electoral district was an electoral district of Sri Lanka between March 1960 and February 1989. The district was named after the town of Balapitiya in Galle District, Southern Province. The 1978 Constitution of Sri Lanka introduced the proportional representation electoral system for electing members of Parliament. The existing 160 mainly single-member electoral districts were replaced with 22 multi-member electoral districts. Balapitiya electoral district was replaced by the Galle multi-member electoral district at the 1989 general elections.

== Members of Parliament ==
Key

Independent SLFP UNP

Election	Member	Party	Term
1960 (March)	Lakshman de Silva	SLFP	1960
1960 (July)	Lakshman de Silva	SLFP	1960-1965
1965	L. C. de Silva	LSSP	1965-1968
1968 parliamentary by-election	Lakshman de Silva	UNP	1968-1970
1970	Weerasinghe de Silva	LSSP	1970-1977
1977	Norman Waidyaratna	UNP	1977-1989

== Elections ==
=== 1960 (March) Parliamentary General Election ===
Results of the 4th parliamentary election held on 19 March 1960:

Candidate	Party	Symbol	Votes	%
Lakshman de Silva	Sri Lanka Freedom Party	Hand	8,465	32.86
L. C. de Silva	Lanka Sama Samaja Party	Key	7,818	30.35
Ian de Zoysa	United National Party	Elephant	6,235	24.20
Dharmasekera Welaratne		Sun	1,304	5.06
A. S. de Zoysa Jayatilaka		Umbrella	1,027	3.99
Wijayananda Lokusuriya		Lamp	525	2.04
A. P. de Zoysa	Buddhist Republican Party	Flower	145	0.56
Jayasena Munasinghe		Cockrel	116	0.45
Valid Votes			25,635	99.51
Rejected Votes			126	0.49
Total Polled			25,761	100.00
Registered Electors			34,384	
Turnout				74.92

=== 1960 (July) Parliamentary General Election ===
Results of the 5th parliamentary election held on 20 July 1960:

Candidate	Party	Symbol	Votes	%
Lakshman de Silva	Sri Lanka Freedom Party	Hand	13,812	55.31
V. T. de Zoysa	United National Party	Elephant	10,841	43.42
Jayasena Munasinghe	Buddhist Republican Party	Flower	317	1.27
Valid Votes			24,970	100.00
Rejected Votes			-	0.0
Total Polled			24,970	100.00
Registered Electors			34,384	
Turnout				72.62

=== 1965 Parliamentary General Election ===
Results of the 6th parliamentary election held on 22 March 1965:

Candidate	Party	Symbol	Votes	%
L. C. de Silva	Lanka Sama Samaja Party	Key	16,615	49.39
Lakshman de Silva	Sri Lanka Freedom Socialist Party	Sun	16,519	49.10
Jayasena Munasinghe		Lamp	164	0.49
P. L. V. Gunawardane		Eye	130	0.39
Valid Votes			33,428	99.36
Rejected Votes			214	0.64
Total Polled			33,642	100.00
Registered Electors			41,823	
Turnout				80.44

=== 1968 Parliamentary By-Election ===
In December 1967 the incumbent, Lokuge de Silva, was unseated on the ground that he had a contract with government. The results of the 1968 parliamentary by-election held on 17 December for the electorate:

Candidate	Party	Symbol	Votes	%
Lakshman de Silva	United National Party	Elephant	19,485	51.87
Weerasinghe de Silva	Lanka Sama Samaja Party	Key	17,955	47.78
Valid Votes			37,440	99.67
Rejected Votes			124	0.33
Total Polled			37,564	100.00
Registered Electors			44,043	
Turnout				85.29

=== 1970 Parliamentary General Election ===
Results of the 7th parliamentary election held on 27 May 1970:

Candidate	Party	Symbol	Votes	%
Weerasinghe de Silva	Lanka Sama Samaja Party	Key	22,659	59.18
Lakshman de Silva	United National Party	Elephant	14,431	37.69
E. M. M. Wijerama		Bell	951	2.48
Jayasena Munasinghe		Ship	169	0.44
Valid Votes			38,210	99.80
Rejected Votes			76	0.20
Total Polled			38,286	100.00
Registered Electors			45,862	
Turnout				83.48

=== 1977 Parliamentary General Election ===
Results of the 8th parliamentary election held on 21 July 1977:

Candidate	Party	Symbol	Votes	%
Norman Waidyaratna	United National Party	Elephant	15,745	56.60
Weerasinghe de Silva	Lanka Sama Samaja Party	Key	6,803	24.46
Lakshman de Silva	Independent	Hand	4,556	16.38
H. P Sudarman de Silva		Eye	343	1.23
W. S. M. M. Abeysekera		Table	156	0.56
S. de S. Alankara		Lamp	128	0.46
Valid Votes			27,731	99.69
Rejected Votes			87	0.31
Total Polled			27,818	100.00
Registered Electors			33,016	
Turnout				84.26
