= Baddegama Samitha Thera =

Sri Lankan Buddhist monk and politician (1952–2021)

Ven. Baddegama Samitha Thera
- පූජ්‍ය බද්දේගම සමිත හිමි
- Title: Chief Incumbent of the Baddegama Gothatuwa Sripada Chaithyaramaya

Personal life
- Born: 14 September 1952 Baddegama, Dominion of Ceylon
- Died: 30 May 2021 (aged 68) Matara, Sri Lanka
- Cause of death: Complications from COVID-19
- Education: University of Kelaniya; Lancaster University

Religious life
- Religion: Buddhism
- Temple: Baddegama Gothatuwa Sripada Chaithyaramaya
- School: Theravada
- Dharma names: Ven. Baddegama Samitha Thera

Member of Parliament for Galle District
- In office 2001–2004

Personal details
- Party: Sri Lanka Podujana Peramuna
- Other political affiliations: Lanka Sama Samaja Party; United People's Freedom Alliance

Baddegama Samitha Thera also simply known as Samitha Thera (14 September 1952 – 30 May 2021: Sinhala: පූජ්‍ය බද්දේගම සමිත හිමි) was a Sri Lankan Buddhist monk and a politician. A member of the Lanka Sama Samaja Party (LSSP), Ven. Baddegama Samitha Thera was a member of the Sri Lankan Parliament for Galle District from 2001 to 2004. He represented the Southern Provincial Council under United People's Freedom Alliance. Samitha Thera is regarded as the first ever Buddhist monk to enter the Parliament of Sri Lanka.

== Early life ==
He was born on 14 September 1952 at Opatha Naiduwa Estate in Baddegama, Dominion of Ceylon (now Sri Lanka). His birth name was Harold Thrimavithana and became a novice monk on 24 June 1965. Later he was ordained with Upasampada on June 25, 1972 at the age of 20. He was a student of Ven. Ganegama Sri Saranankara Thera and received his primary education from Opatha Government College; Baddegama Rathanasara College, and Baddegama Rathanasara Vidya Pirivena.

He entered Kelaniya University in 1976, and got involved in student politics by becoming an active member of the left-wing student movement at the university. He also served as the president of the student wing. But in 1978 his studentship at the university was suspended due to a student clash that occurred. He was not allowed to complete his degree at the Kelanya University.

== Political life ==
Ven. Samitha continued with his politics and through the party, he attended many international seminars. It was while attending a seminar on Third World development in Germany in 1986, that he went across to England where, he received a scholarship to Lancaster University. There he read "Comparative Religions and Third World Development" for his degree. Even in university he got involved in the fight against apartheid. After completing his degree he returned to Sri Lanka in 1988, and became a member of the executive committee of the Nava Sama Samaja Party.

In 1991, he entered mainstream politics when he contested the local government elections through the Nava Sama Samaja Pakshaya where he gained over 3000 preferential votes. He was elected to the council. However, in 1994 along with Vasudeva Nanayakkara, he joined the Lanka Sama Samaja Pakshaya. In 1997, he was elected as a member of the Southern Provincial Council for the first time and later in 2001 he was elected to the parliament of Sri Lanka. In 2002, Samitha Thera presided over the Hiroshima Conference in Japan.

But Samitha Thera lost his parliament seat in the 2004 Sri Lankan general election and he served as an active member of the Southern Provincial Council. He also contested the 2020 Sri Lankan parliamentary election representing Sri Lanka Podujana Peramuna.

== Death ==
He was receiving treatment at the Karapitiya Teaching Hospital in Galle for COVID-19. Samitha Thera recovered and stayed at the Sri Pada Chaithyarama Temple in Gothatuwa, Baddegama for about 10 days. However his condition worsened again and he attended a private hospital in Matara. Later, Samitha Thera died on 30 May 2021 due to COVID-19 pneumonia complications at the age of 69 while receiving treatment. The funeral was held at the Baddegama Crematorium on the afternoon of May 30 in accordance with quarantine rules. Prior to the cremation, religious activities including the offering of memorial garments on behalf of Samitha Thera were held at the Baddegama Town Hall with the participation of the Maha Sangha.
