= M. P. de Zoysa =

Sri Lankan politician

The Honourable M. P. de Zoysa

Member of the Ceylon Parliament for Ambalangoda-Balapitiya
- In office 1956–1960
- Preceded by: Ian de Zoysa/P. H. de Silva
- Succeeded by: Constituency Abolished

Member of Parliament for Rathgama
- In office 1960–1965
- Preceded by: Constituency Established
- Succeeded by: Edwin Tillekeratne

Personal details
- Born: Manameldura Piyadasa de Zoysa; 1910
- Party: Sri Lanka Freedom Party
- Children: Suneththa, Sriya, Susil, Upul, Gowri, Sujeema
- Education: Ananda College, Colombo
- Occupation: Politics

Manameldura Piyadasa de Zoysa (born 1910) was a Ceylonese politician.

De Zoysa was involved in Sri Lankan politics before the country's independence and was associated with the State Council of Ceylon established under the Donoughmore Constitution.

In 1956 he was elected to Parliament from Ambalangoda-Balapitiya, representing the Mahajana Eksath Peramuna party. In 1959 he was appointed the Minister of Labour in the cabinet of W. Dahanayake.

At the Parliamentary elections in March 1960 he was elected from the Rathgama electoral district, retaining the seat in the subsequent elections in July that year. De Zoysa resigned from the seat in late 1960 following his implication in the Thalagodapitiya Bribery Commission report. He later accepted a position in the Senate of Ceylon, replacing G. P. Wickramarachchi.
