= Welagedara =

Welagedara may refer to:

- Dingiri Bandara Welagedara (1915–1989), Sri Lankan politician
- Welagedara Stadium, stadium in Sri Lanka
