= M. H. Saddhasena =

Ceylonese physician and politician

Manane Hewa Saddhasena

Member of the Ceylon Parliament for Southern Province
- In office 1965–1970

Manane Hewa Saddhasena was a Ceylonese physician and politician. He was a Member of Parliament from 1965 to 1970.

Born to a wealthy family from Ambalangoda, he graduated from the Ceylon Medical College, where his batch-mates included Dr P. R. Anthonis. An active member of the United National Party, he contested 1952 general election from the Ambalangoda-Balapitiya electorate, but came third. He contested the 1965 general election from the Ambalangoda electorate from the United National Party, and was elected to the House of Representatives defeating P. de S. Kularatne. He was defeated in the 1970 general election.
