= Ambalangoda-Balapitiya Electoral District =

Historical Sri Lankan electoral district

Ambalangoda-Balapitiya electoral district was an electoral district of Sri Lanka between August 1947 and March 1960. The district was named after the towns of Ambalangoda and Balapitiya in Galle District, Southern Province. The electorate was a two-member seat. The 1978 Constitution of Sri Lanka introduced the proportional representation electoral system for electing members of Parliament. The existing 160 mainly single-member electoral districts were replaced with 22 multi-member electoral districts. Ambalangoda-Balapitiya electoral district was replaced by the Galle multi-member electoral district at the 1989 general elections, the first under the proportional representation system.

== Members of Parliament ==
Key

Independent SLFP UNP

Election	Member	Party	Term
1947	P. H. William de Silva	LSSP	
1947	Arthur de Zoysa	UNP	
1952	Ian de Zoysa	UNP	
1952	P. H. William de Silva	LSSP	
1956	M. P. de Zoysa	MEP	
1956	P. H. William de Silva	MEP	

== Elections ==
=== 1947 Parliamentary General Election ===
Results of the 1st parliamentary election held between 23 August 1947 and 20 September 1947:

Candidate	Party	Symbol	Votes	%
P. H. William de Silva	Lanka Sama Samaja Party	Umbrella	37,650	36.28
Arthur de Zoysa	United National Party	Eye	26,764	25.79
P. de S. Kularatne		House	17,520	16.88
P. A. Premadasa		Spoon	9,086	8.76
D. Stanley de Zoysa		Pair of Scales	3,927	3.78
S. Abeygunawardena		Cartwheel	3,105	2.99
K. T. E. de Silva		Flower	2,000	1.93
D. J. Prematilleke		Elephant	1,002	0.97
Valid Votes			101,504	97.81
Rejected Votes			2,724	2.19
Total Polled			103,778	100.00
Registered Electors			104,843	
Turnout				98.98

=== 1950 Parliamentary By Election ===
Results of the 1950 by-election held on 20 May 1950:

Candidate	Party	Symbol	Votes	%
Walwin de Silva		Key	23,558	49.41
Ian de Zoysa		Bird	21,590	45.28
J. Sumanasena		Butterfly	1,429	2.99
S. D. S. Goonetilleke		Umbrella	600	1.26
Valid Votes			47,177	98.94
Rejected Votes			505	1.06
Total Polled			47,682	100.00
Registered Electors			104,843	
Turnout				45.48

=== 1952 Parliamentary General Election ===
Results of the 2nd parliamentary election held between 24 May 1952 and 30 May 1952:

Candidate	Party	Symbol	Votes	%
Ian de Zoysa	United National Party	Lamp	37,901	29.80
P. H. William de Silva	Lanka Sama Samaja Party	Eye	33,803	26.58
A. H. E. Fernando	Sri Lanka Freedom Party	Elephant	18,657	14.67
M. H. Saddhasena		Hand	16,945	13.33
M. P. de Zoysa	Sri Lanka Freedom Party	Star	12,496	9.83
W. A. de Silva		Key	6,017	4.73
S. D. S. Goonetilleka		Umbrella	1,335	1.05
Valid Votes			127,154	97.74
Rejected Votes			2,942	2.26
Total Polled			130,096	100.00
Registered Electors			92,398	
Turnout				

=== 1956 Parliamentary General Election ===
Results of the 3rd parliamentary election held between 5 April 1956 and 10 April 1956:

Candidate	Party	Symbol	Votes	%
M. P. de Zoysa	Mahajana Eksath Peramuna	Hand	45,626	35.19
P. H. William de Silva	Mahajana Eksath Peramuna	Cartwheel	43,769	33.76
Ian de Zoysa	Sri Lanka Freedom Party	Elephant	22,959	17.71
Sommie Ranasinghe		Umbrella	12,811	9.88
N. C. D. de Silva		Eye	1,796	1.38
Valid Votes			126,961	97.92
Rejected Votes			2,691	2.08
Total Polled			129,652	
Registered Electors			100,326	
Turnout				
