= Baddegama Electoral District =

Electoral district of Sri Lanka

Baddegama electoral district was an electoral district of Sri Lanka between August 1947 and February 1989. The district was named after the town of Baddegama in Galle District, Southern Province. The 1978 Constitution of Sri Lanka introduced the proportional representation electoral system for electing members of Parliament. The existing 160 mainly single-member electoral districts were replaced with 22 multi-member electoral districts. Baddegama electoral district was replaced by the Galle multi-member electoral district at the 1989 general elections, the first under the proportional representation system.

== Members of Parliament ==
Key

Independent SLFP UNP LSSP

Election	Member	Party	Term
1947	Simon Abeywickrema	UNP	1947-1948
1948 by-election	H. W. Amarasuriya	UNP	1947-1952
1952	Henry Abeywickrema	SLFP	1952-1956
1956	Henry Abeywickrema	SLFP	1956-1960
1960 (March)	Neal de Alwis	LSSP	1960
1960 (July)	Neal de Alwis	LSSP	1960-1965
1965	Neal de Alwis	LSSP	1965-1970
1970	Neal de Alwis	LSSP	1970-1977
1977	E. D. Wickrematilaka	UNP	1977-1989

== Elections ==
=== 1947 Parliamentary General Election ===
Results of the 1st parliamentary election held between 23 August 1947 and 20 September 1947:

Candidate	Party	Symbol	Votes	%
Simon Abeywickrema		Star	11,899	55.46
F. Gunatilaka		Key	5,056	23.57
M. C. B. de Silva		Hand	3,431	15.99
V. Abeywickrama		Elephant	784	3.65
Valid Votes			21,170	98.68
Rejected Votes			284	1.32
Total Polled			21,454	100.00
Registered Electors			38,457	
Turnout				55.79

=== 1948 Parliamentary By-Election ===
Results of the 1948 parliamentary by-election, held on 1948:

Candidate	Party	Symbol	Votes	%
H. W. Amarasuriya	United National Party	Elephant	11,414	52.14
Henry Abeywickrema		Umbrella	4,769	21.79
Frederick Gunatilleke		Key	4,574	20.89
Vincent Abeywickrama		Star	798	3.65
Valid Votes			21,555	98.47
Rejected Votes			336	1.53
Total Polled			21,891	100.00
Registered Electors			38,457	
Turnout				56.92

=== 1952 Parliamentary General Election ===
Results of the 2nd parliamentary election held between 24 May 1952 and 30 May 1952:

Candidate	Party	Symbol	Votes	%
Henry Abeywickrema	Sri Lanka Freedom Party	Hand	15,304	49.33
H. W. Amarasuriya		Key	11,372	36.65
P. A. Premadasa		Star	3,230	10.41
Welaratne Dharmasekera		Umbrella	556	1.79
C. J. Seneviratne		Elephant	322	1.04
Valid Votes			30,784	99.22
Rejected Votes			242	0.78
Total Polled			31,026	100.00
Registered Electors			39,495	
Turnout				78.56

=== 1956 Parliamentary General Election ===
Results of the 3rd parliamentary election held between 5 April 1956 and 10 April 1956:

Candidate	Party	Symbol	Votes	%
Henry Abeywickrema	Sri Lanka Freedom Party	Hand	18,834	56.16
H. W. Amarasuriya	United National Party	Elephant	11,082	33.05
M. C. B. de Silva		Umbrella	3,397	10.13
Valid Votes			33,313	99.34
Rejected Votes			222	0.66
Total Polled			33,535	100.00
Registered Electors			45,051	
Turnout				74.44

=== 1960 (March) Parliamentary General Election ===
Results of the 4th parliamentary election held on 19 March 1960:

Candidate	Party	Symbol	Votes	%
Neal de Alwis	Lanka Sama Samaja Party	Key	4,871	19.54
Arthur Suriarachchi	United National Party	Elephant	4,700	18.86
E. D. Wickrematilaka		Rooster	4,528	18.17
D. A. S. P. Dahanayake		Umbrella	2,904	11.65
Vincent Abeywickrema		Hand	2,776	11.14
Francis Tudawe		Cartwheel	2,764	11.09
Don Upasena Jayasekera		Star	1,060	4.25
K. M. G. Stephen Hapugoda		Pair of Scales	769	3.09
M. K. Abraham de Silva		Sun	338	1.36
Valid Votes			24,710	99.14
Rejected Votes			215	0.86
Total Polled			24,925	100.00
Registered Electors			32,178	
Turnout				77.46

=== 1960 (July) Parliamentary General Election ===
Results of the 5th parliamentary election held on 20 July 1960:

Candidate	Party	Symbol	Votes	%
Neal de Alwis	Lanka Sama Samaja Party	Key	11,692	48.87
Arthur Suriarachchi	United National Party	Elephant	7,282	30.44
E. D. Wickrematilleke		Cartwheel	4,332	18.11
D. A. S. P. Dahanayake		Rabbit	299	1.25
Valid Votes			23,808	99.51
Rejected Votes			117	0.49
Total Polled			23,925	100.00
Registered Electors			32,178	
Turnout				74.35

=== 1965 Parliamentary General Election ===
Results of the 6th parliamentary election held on 22 March 1965:

Candidate	Party	Symbol	Votes	%
Neal de Alwis	Lanka Sama Samaja Party	Key	15,546	46.83
E. D. Wickrematilaka	United National Party	Elephant	14,813	44.62
Arthur Suriarachchi		Lamp	1,313	3.96
Cyril Ekanayake		Cartwheel	1,289	3.88
Valid Votes			32,961	99.30
Rejected Votes			234	0.70
Total Polled			33,195	100.00
Registered Electors			40,228	
Turnout				82.52

=== 1970 Parliamentary General Election ===
Results of the 7th parliamentary election held on 27 May 1970:

Candidate	Party	Symbol	Votes	%
Neal de Alwis	Lanka Sama Samaja Party	Key	22,126	57.53
E. D. Wickrematilleke	United National Party	Elephant	16,240	42.23
Valid Votes			38,366	99.75
Rejected Votes			95	0.25
Total Polled			38,461	100.00
Registered Electors			44,391	
Turnout				86.64

=== 1977 Parliamentary General Election ===
Results of the 8th parliamentary election held on 21 July 1977:

Candidate	Party	Symbol	Votes	%
E. D. Wickrematillake	United National Party	Elephant	23,275	51.72
Neal de Alwis	Sri Lanka Freedom Party	Hand	17,778	39.50
Piyadasa A. Ratnapala		Key	3,123	6.94
Edwin Jayawickrema		Chair	498	1.09
E. M. Dayawansa		Umbrella	101	0.22
Mendis Tennakoon		Cartwheel	71	0.16
Valid Votes			44,846	99.64
Rejected Votes			160	0.36
Total Polled			45,006	100.00
Registered Electors			50,963	
Turnout				88.31
