= Simon Abeywickrema =

Sri Lankan politician (1903–1948)

Simon Abeywickrema (1903 - 2 May 1948) was a Sri Lankan politician.

Simon Abeywickrema was born in 1903 in Baddegama and received his education at Richmond College and St. Aloysious' College in Galle.

Abeywickrema unsuccessfully contested for the State Council, in the Udugama electorate, at the 1931 and 1936 elections but was subsequently elected in a 1938 by-election. When the United National Party was formed in 1946, he was selected as the party's vice president.

Abeywickrema was elected, representing Baddegama, at the 1st parliamentary election in 1947. He served as the Parliamentary Secretary to the Minister of Transport in the D. S. Senanayake cabinet. Abeywickrema died in office on 2 May 1948. In the subsequent July by-election his younger brother, Henry, unsuccessfully contested the seat of Baddegama, losing to H. W. Amarasuriya.

Abeywickrema was recognised with the naming of Simon Abeywickrema Avenue, a 0.27 km (0.17 mi) road in Mount Lavinia.
