= Dingiri =

Dingiri is a Sinhalese given name. Notable people with the name include:

- Dingiri Bandara Welagedara (1915–1989), Sri Lankan politician
- Dingiri Banda Wijetunga (1916–2008), President of Sri Lanka
