= Bertram Ivor Palipane =

Ceylonese lawyer and politician

Bertram Ivor Palipane (23 August 1913 - 1 August 2003) was a Ceylonese lawyer and landowner. He was an elected member of the Senate of Ceylon from 1952 to 1957.

Born on 23 August 1913 in Gampola, he was educated at S. Thomas' College, Mount Lavinia where he won the Wijewardhana Science Prize and the Duke of Edinburgh Scholarship. Won colours in cricket, soccer, and athletics. In his final year he won the Victoria Jubilee Gold Medal for the best all-round student. He studied at the Colombo University College and at the Ceylon Law College, qualifying as a proctor.

Palipane started his legal practice in the Kurunegala unofficial bar in 1936, and later was appointed a rural court judge. In 1942, he resigned and was appointed Controller, Air Raid Precautions during World War 2. He later served as a Justice of the Peace and Unofficial magistrate.

Following the war, he entered politics having become the first secretary of the Kurunegala branch of the United National Party and contested the 1947 general election from Kurunegala and lost to Herbert Sri Nissanka. In 1952, he was elected unanimously to the Senate of Ceylon. He again contested the 1970 general election from Hiriyala from the Sri Lanka Freedom Party and lost to S. B. Herat. He was appointed Chairmen of the State Timber Corporation for 9 months in 1971 before he was removed by Minister.

He married Nanda Madahapola Kumarihamy and they had four children. He died on 1 August 2003 and was cremated at the family burial ground close to his house, Palipana Walawwa, Kurunegala.
