= Udugama Electoral District =

Electoral district of Sri Lanka

Udugama electoral district was an electoral district of Sri Lanka between August 1947 and March 1960. The district was named after the town of Udugama in Galle District, Southern Province. The 1978 Constitution of Sri Lanka introduced the proportional representation electoral system for electing members of Parliament. The existing 160 mainly single member electoral districts were replaced with 22 multi-member electoral districts. Udugama electoral district was replaced by the Galle multi-member electoral district at the 1989 general elections, the first under the proportional representation system.

== Members of Parliament ==
Key

Independent SLFP UNP LSSP

Election	Member	Party	Term
1947	D. S. Goonesekera	UNP	1947 – 1952
1952	Neal de Alwis	LSSP	1952 – 1956
1956	D. S. Goonesekera	SLFP	1956 – 1960

== Elections ==
=== 1947 Parliamentary General Election ===
Results of the 1st parliamentary election held between 23 August 1947 and 20 September 1947:

Candidate	Party	Symbol	Votes	%
D. S. Goonesekera	United National Party	Star	8,957	45.06
Neal de Alwis	Lanka Sama Samaja Party	Clock	3,493	17.57
D. E. Hettiarachchi		Key	3,148	15.84
P. L. N. Raddalgoda		Tree	2,003	10.08
B. Kulasinghe		Eye	783	3.94
C. G. E. Bertram De Silva		Hand	719	3.62
H. G. Hendrick De Silva		Flower	423	2.13
Valid Votes			19,526	98.22
Rejected Votes			354	1.78
Total Polled			19,880	100.00
Registered Electors			36,893	
Turnout				53.89

=== 1952 Parliamentary General Election ===
Results of the 2nd parliamentary election held between 24 May 1952 and 30 May 1952:

Candidate	Party	Symbol	Votes	%
Neal de Alwis	Lanka Sama Samaja Party	Umbrella	11,181	42.88
D. S. Goonesekera		Star	8,446	32.39
Edwin Dias Nagahawatte		Elephant	6,160	23.63
Valid Votes			25,787	98.90
Rejected Votes			286	1.10
Total Polled			26,073	100.00
Registered Electors			38,240	
Turnout				68.18

=== 1956 Parliamentary General Election ===
Results of the 3rd parliamentary election held between 5 April 1956 and 10 April 1956:

Candidate	Party	Symbol	Votes	%
D. S. Goonesekera	Sri Lanka Freedom Party	Hand	12,411	40.87
Neal de Alwis	Lanka Sama Samaja Party	Lamp	10,100	33.26
E. D. Wickramatilleke		Umbrella	5,875	19.34
E. D. Nagahawatte	United National Party	Elephant	1,737	5.72
Valid Votes			30,123	99.19
Rejected Votes			247	0.81
Total Polled			30,370	100.00
Registered Electors			43,101	
Turnout				70.46
