= D. S. Goonesekera =

Sri Lankan politician (1896–1983)

Hon. D. S. Goonesekera

Minister of Labour and Social Services
- In office 28 May 1963 – 1964
- Prime Minister: Sirimavo Bandaranaike
- Preceded by: M. P. de Z. Sriwardene
- Succeeded by: M. H. Mohamed

Member of the Ceylon Parliament for Habaraduwa
- In office 1960–1964
- Preceded by: Prins Gunasekera

Member of the Ceylon Parliament for Udugama
- In office 1956–1960
- Preceded by: Neal de Alwis
- In office 1947–1952
- Succeeded by: Neal de Alwis

Personal details
- Born: 13 November 1896 Habaraduwa, British Ceylon
- Died: 7 August 1983 (aged 86)
- Party: Sri Lanka Freedom Party
- Spouse: Nandawathie Victoria Wickremasinghe
- Children: 5
- Education: Dharmika School, Katukurunda; Mahinda College, Galle
- Occupation: land surveyor, politician
- Profession: Surveyor

Don Samuel Goonesekera (13 November 1896 – 7 August 1983) was a Sri Lankan politician and member of parliament.

Don Samuel Goonesekera was born 13 November 1896 in Habaraduwa, the only son of Don Marthelis Goonesekera and Dona Clare Abeygoonewardena. He received his primary education from the Dharmika School, Katukurunda, Habaraduwa and his secondary education at Mahinda College, Galle. He then worked as a land surveyor before entering into politics. In 1927 he became the chairman of the Kodagoda Village Council. In 1939 he was elected as a Councilor (representing the Main Street Ward) on the Galle Municipal Council and in 1944 was subsequently elected as Mayor of Galle. At the first parliament election in 1947 he contested the seat for the Udugama Electoral District, on behalf of the United National Party, becoming its first MP. In the subsequent parliamentary election in 1952 he lost the seat, after switching to the Sri Lanka Freedom Party. He was successful in regaining the seat at the 1956 parliamentary election. In 1959 he was appointed as Parliamentary Secretary to the Minister of Trade and Commerce by Prime Minister S. W. R. D. Bandaranaike.

He had five children: Tilak (1929-2021), who was a consultant eye surgeon and married to Padma née Wickremasinghe (1931-2019) also a consultant eye surgeon. Their daughter, Damithri, also became a consultant eye surgeon; Sanath, a medical administrator; Vineetha Indrani and Mahinda, medical specialists; and Palitha, an attorney at law.
