= Kurunegala Electoral District (1947–1989) =

Electoral district of Sri Lanka

Kurunegala electoral district was an electoral district of Sri Lanka between August 1947 and February 1989. The district was named after the town of Kurunegala in Kurunegala District, North Western Province. The 1978 Constitution of Sri Lanka introduced the proportional representation electoral system for electing members of Parliament. The existing 160 mainly single-member electoral districts were replaced with 22 multi-member electoral districts. Kurunegala electoral district was replaced by the Kurunegala multi-member electoral district at the 1989 general elections, the first under the proportional representation system, Kurunegala continues to be a polling division of the multi-member electoral district.

== Members of Parliament ==
Key

Independent SLFP UNP

Election	Member	Party	Term
1947	Herbert Sri Nissanka	Ind.	1947-1952
1952	Dingiri Bandara Welagedara	UNP	1952-1956
1956	D. B. Monnekulama	SLFP	1956-1960
1960 (March)	D. B. Monnekulama	SLFP	1960
1960 (July)	D. B. Monnekulama	SLFP	1960-1965
1965	Dingiri Bandara Welagedara	UNP	1965-1970
1970	Piyadasa Wijesinghe	SLFP	1970-1977
1977	Dingiri Bandara Welagedara	UNP	1977-1989

== Elections ==
=== 1947 Parliamentary General Election ===
Candidate	Party	Symbol	Votes	%
Herbert Sri Nissanka	Independent	Umbrella	10,188	48.23
I. Palipane		Star	6,642	31.44
J. H. Weerasingha		Key	3,983	18.85
Valid Votes			20,83	98.52
Rejected Votes			312	1.48
Total Polled			21,125	100.00
Registered Electors			38,497	
Turnout				54.87

=== 1952 Parliamentary General Election ===
Candidate	Party	Symbol	Votes	%
Dingiri Bandara Welagedara	United National Party	Elephant	18,049	56.85
Herbert Sri Nissanka	Independent	Umbrella	13,518	42.58
Valid Votes			31,567	99.42
Rejected Votes			184	0.58
Total Polled			31,751	100.00
Registered Electors			41,367	
Turnout				76.75

=== 1956 Parliamentary General Election ===
Candidate	Party	Symbol	Votes	%
D. B. Monnekulama	Sri Lanka Freedom Party	Hand	18,598	54.23
Dingiri Bandara Welagedara	United National Party	Elephant	10,239	29.86
S. G. Wanigasekera		Star	5,284	15.41
Valid Votes			34,121	99.50
Rejected Votes			172	0.50
Total Polled			34,293	100.00
Registered Electors			48,822	
Turnout				70.24

=== 1960 (March) Parliamentary General Election ===
Candidate	Party	Symbol	Votes	%
D. B. Monnekulama	Sri Lanka Freedom Party	Hand	8,176	44.52
D. A. B. Ratnayake	United National Party	Elephant	6,684	36.39
H. L. Premadaasa		Star	1,279	6.96
P. R. Wickremasuriya		Cartwheel	681	3.71
A. L. M. C.M. Sheriff		Sun	630	3.43
W. W. Premaratne		Umbrella	595	3.24
S. B. G. Abeyaratne Bandara		Eye	184	1.00
Valid Votes			18,229	99.26
Rejected Votes			136	0.74
Total Polled			18,365	100.00
Registered Electors			24,864	
Turnout				73.86

=== 1960 (July) Parliamentary General Election ===
Candidate	Party	Symbol	Votes	%
D. B. Monnekulama	Sri Lanka Freedom Party	Hand	10,193	53.85
N. M. Appuhamy	United National Party	Elephant	8,533	45.08
P. R. Wickremasuriya		Cartwheel	123	0.65
Valid Votes			18,849	99.58
Rejected Votes			80	0.42
Total Polled			18,929	100.00
Registered Electors			24,864	
Turnout				76.13

=== 1965 Parliamentary General Election ===
Candidate	Party	Symbol	Votes	%
Dingiri Bandara Welagedara	United National Party	Elephant	13,875	53.82
Ananda Jayasinghe	Sri Lanka Freedom Party	Hand	11,490	44.57
D. B. Monnekulama		Umbrella	152	0.59
P. R. Wickramasuriya		Cartwheel	120	0.47
Valid Votes			25,637	99.45
Rejected Votes			142	0.55
Total Polled			25,779	100.00
Registered Electors			31,344	
Turnout				82.25

=== 1970 Parliamentary General Election ===
Candidate	Party	Symbol	Votes	%
Piyadasa Wijesinghe	Sri Lanka Freedom Party	Hand	16,672	53.96
Dingiri Bandara Welagedara	United National Party	Elephant	14,008	45.33
Lionel Kehelwatugoda		Bell	94	0.30
Valid Votes			30,774	99.60
Rejected Votes			125	0.40
Total Polled			30,899	100.00
Registered Electors			36,663	
Turnout				84.28

=== 1977 Parliamentary General Election ===
Candidate	Party	Symbol	Votes	%
Dingiri Bandara Welagedara	United National Party	Elephant	21,005	59.45
D. B. Monnekulama		Chair	13,550	38.35
Charles Vitharana		Key	436	1.23
Siripala Wedisinghe		Rabbit	152	0.43
W. M. Dharmaratne		Umbrella	79	0.22
Valid Votes			35,222	99.68
Rejected Votes			112	0.32
Total Polled			35,334	100.00
Registered Electors			41,104	
Turnout				85.96
