= L. C. de Silva =

Ceylonese politician

Lokuge Chandradasa de Silva (born 31 August 1920) was a Ceylonese politician.

De Silva was educated at Dharmasoka College, Ambalangoda. In 1947 he married Pearl Warusevitane (1927–1999). In the early 1950s de Silva was appointed as the Manager of Dharmasoka College, a role he held until the school was taken over by the Government in 1960. He took a leading part in the 1953 Hartal, in the same year he was elected to the Watugedera Town Council, serving as its Chairman from 1956 until 1965.

At the 4th parliamentary election, held on 19 March 1960, de Silva ran as the Lanka Sama Samaja Party candidate in the newly created electorate of Balapitiya. He failed to get elected polling 7,818 votes (30% of the total vote), 647 votes behind the Sri Lanka Freedom Party candidate, Lakshman de Silva but 1,583 votes ahead of the United National Party candidate, Ian de Zoysa. In 1964 he was appointed as the Chairman of the National Lotteries Board, serving for a year.

At the 6th parliamentary election, held on 22 March 1965, he re-contested the seat of Balapitiya and was successful defeating the incumbent, Lakshman de Silva, by 96 votes, polling 16,615 (39.4% of the total vote). He was unseated on 21 December 1967 on the ground that he had a contract with government.

De Silva contested the seat of Ambalangoda at the 7th parliamentary election, where he was elected, receiving 22,356 votes (64.4% of the total vote) defeating the incumbent, M. H. Saddhasena, by 10,628 votes. He chaired the Parliamentary Committee of Inquiry into the workings of the Customs Department. At the 8th parliamentary election, held on 21 July 1977, he lost the seat to the United National Party candidate, Raitor Thilakasekara, by 8,175 votes.
