= Henry Abeywickrema =

Sri Lankan politician (1905–1976)

Henry Abeywickrema (27 December 1905 - 29 August 1976) was a Sri Lankan politician.

Abeywickrema was born in 1905 in Baddegama and received his education at Richmond College and St. Aloysious' College in Galle.

Following the death of his older brother, Simon on 2 May 1948, Abeywickrema contested the July by-election for his brother's seat of Baddegama. He was however soundly beaten by over 6,500 votes by the United National Party candidate, H. W. Amarasuriya. In 1951 he joined the newly formed Sri Lanka Freedom Party.

At the 2nd parliamentary election in May 1952, he defeated the sitting member, H. W. Amarasuriya from Baddegama electorate, by 7,752 votes. Abeywickrema retained his seat at the 1956 parliamentary elections, increasing his majority to 56%. Following which he was appointed the Parliamentary Secretary to the Minister of Transport and Works in the S. W. R. D. Bandaranaike cabinet and Minister for Works in the Dahanayake cabinet. He did not contest the 1960 parliamentary elections. In 1965, his civic rights were suspended for seven years following the enactment of the Imposition Of Civic Disabilities (Special Provisions) Act (No. 14 of 1965) based on the Thalagodapitiya Bribery Commission Report.
