= Walwin de Silva =

Sri Lankan civil servant

- Born: 12 August 1905; Balapitiya, Ceylon
- Died: Colombo, Sri Lanka
- Occupation: civil servant

Walwin Arnold de Silva, CCS was a Sri Lankan civil servant. He was the Vice-Chancellor of the University of Ceylon, Colombo and a Member of Parliament.

== Education ==
Walwin was born on 12 August 1905 in Ceylon (now Sri Lanka) at Balapitiya. His father Dr O.A. de Silva, was a registered medical practitioner attached to the Department of Health. He had a younger brother Colvin who became a Trotskyist leader and served as the Cabinet Minister of Plantation Industries and Constitutional Affairs.

He along with his brother received their primary education at St. John's College Panadura and went on to the Royal College, Colombo for secondary education. Entering University College, Ceylon, he studied mathematics under Professor C. Suntharalingam going on to gain an honours degree in Mathematics from the University of London.

== Civil service ==
Having gained admission to the Ceylon Civil Service through the entrance examination, he underwent training as a cadet. In 1927 he was appointed as an Assistant Government Agent. He went on to serve as Assistant Commissioner in Galle, Kegalle, Badulla and Government Agent of Puttalam and other Kachcheries. Thereafter he was posted to the Food Department in Colombo as the Deputy Food Controller. This was during World War II when he was responsible for managing the food supply of the island with careful rationing. He also served as Secretary to the then Minister of Communications of the State Council, Sir John Kotelawala. Thereafter he served as Additional Director and later Acting Director of Education.

== Politics ==
After retiring from the civil service in the late 1940s, he was elected to parliament as independent candidate from the Ambalangoda-Balapitiya electorate in a May 1950 by-election.

== Later work ==
In 1966, he was an appointed a member of the National Council for Higher Education established under the Higher Education Act No. 20 of 1966. In 1968 he was appointed as Vice-Chancellor of the University of Ceylon, Colombo, which he held until 1969. He and his wife endowed two scholarships: the Gita de Silva Memorial scholarship in memory of their daughter and the Sunil de Silva Memorial scholarship in memory of their son.

He also served as Executive Director and thereafter Chairman of the Ceylon and Foreign Trades Ltd after the death of P. Saravanamuttu. He was the Chairman of the Development Finance Corporation of Ceylon (DFCC) and a member of the Board of Directors of the People's Bank.

== Honours ==
The University of Colombo awarded him an honorary Doctor of Letters (Honoris Causa) in 1985.
