= Ambalangoda Electoral District =

Electoral district of Sri Lanka

Ambalangoda electoral district was an electoral district of Sri Lanka between March 1960 and February 1989. The district was named after the town of Ambalangoda in Galle District, Southern Province. The 1978 Constitution of Sri Lanka introduced the proportional representation electoral system for electing members of Parliament. The existing 160 mainly single-member electoral districts were replaced with 22 multi-member electoral districts. Ambalangoda electoral district was replaced by the Galle multi-member electoral district at the 1989 general elections.

== Members of Parliament ==
Key

Independent SLFP UNP

Election	Member	Party	Term
1960 (March)	William de Silva	Mahajana Eksath Peramuna	1960
1960 (July)	P. de S. Kularatne	United National Party	1960-1965
1965	M. H. Saddhasena	United National Party	1965-1970
1970	L. C. de Silva	Lanka Sama Samaja Party	1970-1977
1977	Raitor Thilakasekara	United National Party	1977-1988

== Elections ==
=== 1960 (March) Parliamentary General Election ===
Results of the 4th parliamentary election held on 19 March 1960:

Candidate	Party	Symbol	Votes	%
William de Silva	Mahajana Eksath Peramuna	Cartwheel	8,716	38.33
P. de S. Kularatne	United National Party	Elephant	6,713	29.52
Wilson Wijetunga	Sri Lanka Freedom Party	Hand	3,521	15.48
Eddie Fernando		Pair of Scales	3,348	14.72
Piyasena Mahamadachchi		Umbrella	216	0.95
M. H. E. Ariyapala		Eye	154	0.68
Valid Votes			22,668	99.69
Rejected Votes			71	0.31
Total Polled			22,739	100.00
Registered Electors			28,618	
Turnout				82.95

=== 1960 (July) Parliamentary General Election ===
Results of the 5th parliamentary election held on 20 July 1960:

Candidate	Party	Symbol	Votes	%
P. de S. Kularatne	United National Party	Elephant	10,034	46.98
William de Silva	Mahajana Eksath Peramuna	Cartwheel	8,045	37.67
P. W. Wilfred de Silva	Lanka Sama Samaja Party	Key	3,215	15.05
Valid Votes			21,294	99.71
Rejected Votes			62	0.29
Total Polled			21,356	100.00
Registered Electors			28,618	
Turnout				74.62

=== 1965 Parliamentary General Election ===
Results of the 6th parliamentary election held on 22 March 1965:

Candidate	Party	Symbol	Votes	%
M. H. Saddhasena	United National Party	Elephant	15,433	52.50
P. de S. Kularatne	Sri Lanka Freedom Party	Hand	13,808	46.98
Valid Votes			29,241	99.48
Rejected Votes			152	0.52
Total Polled			29,393	100.00
Registered Electors			35,335	
Turnout				83.18

=== 1970 Parliamentary General Election ===
Results of the 7th parliamentary election held on 27 May 1970:

Candidate	Party	Symbol	Votes	%
L. C. de Silva	Lanka Sama Samaja Party	Key	22,356	64.40
M. H. Saddhasena	United National Party	Elephant	11,728	33.79
U. D. Kulasinghe		Bell	544	1.57
Valid Votes			34,628	99.76
Rejected Votes			82	0.23
Total Polled			34,710	100.00
Registered Electors			40,103	
Turnout				86.55

=== 1977 Parliamentary General Election ===
Results of the 8th parliamentary election held on 21 July 1977:

Candidate	Party	Symbol	Votes	%
Raitor Thilakasekara	United National Party	Elephant	17,829	51.83
L. C. de Silva	Lanka Sama Samaja Party	Key	9,654	28.06
A. M. Karunaratne	Sri Lanka Freedom Party	Hand	6,748	19.62
S. M. Weihena		Cartwheel	111	0.32
A. D. Peiris		Chair	58	0.17
Valid Votes			34,319	99.76
Rejected Votes			81	0.24
Total Polled			34,400	
Registered Electors			39,254	
Turnout				87.63
