= M. G. Mendis =

Sri Lankan trade unionist and politician (1911–2000)

Hon. M. G. Mendis MP

Rathgama
- In office 1970–1977
- Preceded by: Edwin Thilakaratne
- Succeeded by: Edwin Thilakaratne

Personal details
- Born: Merengna Gaulius Mendis; 3 October 1911 Galle
- Died: 3 August 2000
- Party: Communist Party
- Other political affiliations: Lanka Sama Samaja Party
- Education: Mahinda College, Galle, University of London
- Ethnicity: Sinhalese

Merengna Gaulius Mendis (3 October 1911 – 3 August 2000) was a Sri Lankan trade unionist and a member of the Parliament of Sri Lanka.

== Biography ==
Mendis received his education at Piyaratha Vidyalaya, Dodanduwa, Richmond College and Mahinda College in Galle. He then became a teacher and taught between 1932 and 1934 before he became a full-time trade unionist and political worker.

Mendis was influenced by Indian nationalism, the second civil disobedience movement in India and S. A. Wickremasinghe, a former student, who in 1931 had addressed the students at Mahinda College. After he left school Mendis became a teacher at a Buddhist school. He joined the Suriya-Mal Movement in 1934, and after the formation of the Lanka Sama Samaja Party (LSSP) in 1935 became the joint secretary of the party. Following a split in the LSSP, based on ideological differences linked to Trotskyism, Mendis became the General Secretary of the newly founded United Socialist Party, (USP) (the forerunner of the Communist Party) and the editor of the party’s English journal, the United Socialist.

In December 1940, the Ceylon Trade Union Federation (CTUF) was formed and Mendis was one of the organisations leaders. The CTUF was instrumental in the Colombo harbour strike of 1941. In September 1945, the CTUF led by Mendis organised a march of 10,000 workers to the State Council to present their grievances, which was followed by a six-day strike by tram workers during which Mendis and other trade union officials were arrested.

In 1947 he ran in the first parliamentary elections for the Communist Party in the Colombo South Electoral District but was unsuccessful, only gaining just over 10% of the vote.

In 1965 he contested the 6th parliamentary election in the Rathgama Electoral District where he finished second by 1,210 votes. Mendis successfully ran again in 1970 at the 7th parliamentary election for Lanka Sama Samaja Party, with approximately 65% of the total vote. He was however defeated when he sought re-election for the seat in the 1977 parliamentary elections.
