= Habaraduwa Electoral District =

Former electoral district in Sri Lanka

Habaraduwa electoral district was an electoral district of Sri Lanka between March 1960 and February 1989. The district was named after the town of Habaraduwa in Galle District, Southern Province. The 1978 Constitution of Sri Lanka introduced the proportional representation electoral system for electing members of Parliament. The existing 160 mainly single-member electoral districts were replaced with 22 multi-member electoral districts. Habaraduwa electoral district was replaced by the Galle multi-member electoral district at the 1989 general elections.

== Members of Parliament ==
Key

Independent SLFP UNP

Election	Member	Party	Term
1960 (March)	Prins Gunasekera	MEP	1960
1960 (July)	D. S. Goonesekera	SLFP	1960-65
1965	Prins Gunasekera	Ind	1965-70
1970	Prins Gunasekera	SLFP	1970-77
1977	P. Sumathiratne	UNP	1977-89
1983 by-election	G. W. S. de Silva	UNP	1983-89

== Elections ==
=== 1960 (March) Parliamentary General Election ===
Results of the 4th parliamentary election held on 19 March 1960 for the district:

Candidate	Party	Symbol	Votes	%
Prins Gunasekera	Mahajana Eksath Peramuna	Cartwheel	7,217	29.55
D. A. B. Gunasekera	United National Party	Elephant	7,100	29.07
D. S. Goonesekera	Sri Lanka Freedom Party	Hand	4,801	19.66
Eddy Gunasekera		Umbrella	2,141	8.77
M. K. Piyasena		Key	1,165	4.77
Kithsiri Kumarasinghe		Sun	1,036	4.24
P. Malalgoda		Eye	591	2.42
Leo B. Senaratne		Sewing Machine	193	0.79
Valid Votes			24,244	99.27
Rejected Votes			179	0.73
Total Polled			24,423	100.00
Registered Electors			32,732	
Turnout				74.62

=== 1960 (July) Parliamentary General Election ===
Results of the 5th parliamentary election held on 20 July 1960 for the district:

Candidate	Party	Symbol	Votes	%
D. S. Goonesekera	Sri Lanka Freedom Party	Hand	13,194	54.42
B. D. A. Goonasekera	United National Party	Elephant	8,546	35.25
Prins Gunasekera	Mahajana Eksath Peramuna	Cartwheel	2,404	9.92
Valid Votes			24,140	99.57
Rejected Votes			104	0.43
Total Polled			24,244	100.00
Registered Electors			32,732	
Turnout				74.07

=== 1965 Parliamentary General Election ===
Results of the 6th parliamentary election held on 22 March 1965 for the district:

Candidate	Party	Symbol	Votes	%
Prins Gunasekera	Independent	Lamp	13,838	43.29
G. V. S. de Silva	United National Party	Elephant	13,745	42.99
D. S. Goonesekera	Sri Lanka Freedom Party	Hand	4,178	13.07
Valid Votes			31,761	99.35
Rejected Votes			208	0.65
Total Polled			31,969	100.00
Registered Electors			39,833	
Turnout				80.26

=== 1970 Parliamentary General Election ===
Results of the 7th parliamentary election held on 27 May 1970 for the district:

Candidate	Party	Symbol	Votes	%
Prins Gunasekera	Sri Lanka Freedom Party (Note: In 1971 Gunasekera left the SLFP and continued as an independent member of parliament.)	Hand	22,932	62.92
G. V. S. de Silva	United National Party	Elephant	13,260	36.38
V. Palliyaguru		Bell	176	0.48
Valid Votes			36,368	99.78
Rejected Votes			79	0.22
Total Polled			36,447	100.00
Registered Electors			42,986	
Turnout				84.79

=== 1977 Parliamentary General Election ===
Results of the 8th parliamentary election held on 21 July 1977 for the district:

Candidate	Party	Symbol	Votes	%
P. Sumathiratne	United National Party	Elephant	20,354	56.71
Sarath Wickrama Dias	Sri Lanka Freedom Party	Hand	15,032	41.88
George Ratnayaka		Star	390	1.09
Valid Votes			35,787	99.71
Rejected Votes			103	0.29
Total Polled			35,890	100.00
Registered Electors			40,357	
Turnout				88.93
