= D. B. Monnekulame =

Minister of Nationalised Services and Road Transport (1956-1959)

M. S. B. T. B. Dharmasena Bandara Monnekulame was a Sri Lankan politician. He served as the Parliamentary Secretary to the Minister of Nationalised Services and Road Transport (1956-1959) and was a Member of Parliament from the Kurunegala electoral district.

A founding member of the Sri Lanka Freedom Party, he first contested successfully in the 1956 general elections from the Sri Lanka Freedom Party in the Kurunegala electorate and was elected to the House of Representatives defeating Dingiri Bandara Welagedara from the United National Party. He was then appointed as Parliamentary Secretary to the Minister of Nationalised Services and served until 1959. He was re-elected in the March 1960 and July 1960 general elections, but resigned on 20 December 1960 when he was found guilty by the Bribery Commission. He unsuccessfully contested the 1965 general elections and his civic rights were suspended for seven years following the enactment of the Imposition Of Civic Disabilities (Special Provisions) Act (No. 14 of 1965) based on the Thalagodapitiya Bribery Commission Report. He unsuccessfully contested the 1977 general elections as an independent candidate from the Kurunegala electorate, where he was defeated by Dingiri Bandara Welagedara.
