= Prins Gunasekera =

Ceylonese politician (1924–2018)

Prins Gunasekera (17 July 1924 – 29 December 2018) was a Ceylonese politician, who represented the Habaraduwa electorate in the Galle district.

Gunasekera was born on 17 July 1924 in Kataluwa, a village in Habaraduwa. He was educated at the Kataluwa Government Boys School, Sri Sumangala Vidyalaya, Weligama and Ananda College, Colombo. He obtained a degree from the University of London, as an external student, before entering the Ceylon Law College, becoming an Attorney at Law in 1955. Gunasekera worked as a journalist for the Lankadeepa newspaper, later becoming its chief sub-editor.

In 1956 he was one of the founding members of the Mahajana Eksath Peramuna (People's United Front) where he was elected as the co-secretary to the party and Philip Gunawardena's secretary. Gunawardena requested that he contest for the seat of Horana, on behalf of the party at the 1956 parliamentary elections but he refused due to his work commitments.

Gunasekera was elected to parliament, representing the Mahajana Eksath Peramuna, as the member for the newly created seat of Habaraduwa, at the 4th parliamentary elections held on 19 March 1960. However, as neither of the major political parties managed to obtain a sufficient majority a new election was called. At the subsequent July 1960 elections Gunasekera suffered a heavy loss to the Sri Lanka Freedom Party candidate, D. S. Goonesekera.

At the parliamentary elections in 1965 he ran as an independent, successfully regaining the Habaraduwa electorate. At the 1970 Ceylonese parliamentary election he was re-elected, however this time as the Sri Lanka Freedom Party (SLFP) candidate. In 1971 he left the SLFP, following differences of opinion with Prime Minister Sirimavo Bandaranaike, and continued as an independent member of parliament, although between 1972 and 1975 he worked with the United National Party members, who were in opposition.

== Bibliography ==
- Gunasekera, Prins (1998). A Lost Generation (Sri Lanka in Crisis). Colombo, Sri Lanka: S. Godage & Brothers. ISBN 955-20-2826-4.
