= Malathi de Alwis =

Sri Lanka feminist scholar and activist

Malathi de Alwis (6 October 1963 – 21 January 2021, also known as Mala de Alwis) was a Sri Lankan anthropologist. She taught at the International Centre for Ethnic Studies and the Faculty of Graduate Studies at the University of Colombo. She wrote about militarism, nationalism and feminism.

== Career ==
De Alwis earned her PhD in socio-cultural anthropology from the University of Chicago, where she was a founding member of the Women Against War Coalition and a winner of the Ruth Murray Memorial Prize for Best Essay in Gender Studies.

De Alwis was a senior research fellow at the International Centre for Ethnic Studies in Colombo, Sri Lanka. She also taught as a visiting professor at The New School in New York City. She also taught in the MA Program in Women's Studies at the Faculty of Graduate Studies, University of Colombo.

She wrote about feminist issues such as militarised sexual violence and the memorialisation of grief. Writing with Kumari Jayawardena, she explored how traditional perspectives in gender can become fixed during times of conflict, commenting "fundamentalism uses women's bodies as a battlefield in its struggle to appropriate institutional power". In 2014, de Alwis produced an exhibition with photographer Sharni Jayawardena called "Invoking The Goddess: Pattini-Kannaki Devotion in Sri Lanka" at the India International Centre in New Delhi.

== Selected works ==
=== Books ===
- Feminists Under Fire: Exchanges Across War Zones. Co-edited with Wenona Giles, Edith Klein & Neluka Silva. Toronto: Between the Lines (2003). (This vol. has been translated into Serbian/Bosnian/Croatian, Sinhala & Tamil).
- Casting Pearls: The Women's Franchise Movement in Sri Lanka. With Kumari Jayawardena. Colombo: Social Scientists' Association, 2001.
- Cat's Eye: A Feminist Gaze on Current Issues. Colombo: Social Scientists' Association, 2000.
- Embodied Violence: Communalising Women's Sexuality in South Asia. Co-edited with Kumari Jayawardena. Delhi: Kali for Women/London: Zed Press, 1996.

=== Articles ===
- de Alwis, Malathi (2009). "Interrogating the 'political': feminist peace activism in Sri Lanka". Feminist Review (91): 81–93. ISSN 0141-7789. JSTOR 40663981.
- de Alwis, Malathi (February 2004). "The Moral Mother Syndrome". Indian Journal of Gender Studies. 11 (1): 65–73. doi:10.1177/097152150401100105. S2CID 220724063.
- "Feminism" in A Companion to the Anthropology of Politics, eds. Joan Vincent and David Nugent. Boston: Blackwell, 2004.
- "Beyond Gender: Towards a Feminist Analysis of Humanitarianism and Development in Sri Lanka" in Women's Studies Quarterly, Vol. XXXI: 3&4, Fall/Winter 2003. With Jennifer Hyndman.
