= Kumari Jayawardena =

Sri Lankan academic and activist (born 1931)

Kumari Jayawardena කුමාරි ජයවර්ධන
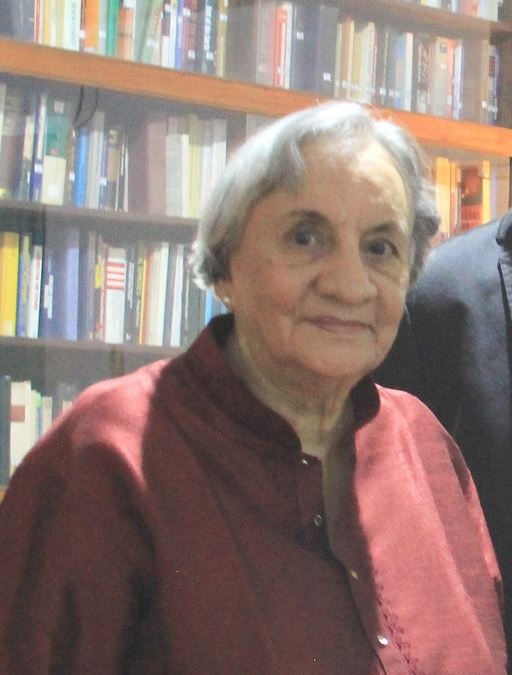
- At home in Colombo, 2018
- Born: Agampodi Kumari Jayawardena; 1931 (age 94–95); Colombo, British Ceylon
- Education: Ladies' College, Colombo
- Alma mater: London School of Economics
- Occupations: Academic, activist
- Notable work: Feminism and Nationalism in the Third World
- Parents: A. P. de Zoysa (father); Eleanor Hutton (mother)

Kumari Jayawardena (Sinhala: කුමාරි ජයවර්ධන; born 1931) is a Sri Lankan feminist activist and academic. Her work is part of the canon of Third-world feminism which conceptualizes feminist philosophies as indigenous and unique to non-Western societies and nations rather than offshoots of Western feminism. She has taught at the University of Colombo and the International Institute of Social Studies.

In the 1980s Jayawardena published Feminism and Nationalism in the Third World, which has become a classic work on non-Western women's movements. She has published other books including The White Woman's Other Burden and written many articles. She founded the Social Scientists' Association in the 1970s and plays an active role in Sri Lankan civil rights movements.

== Early life ==
Jayawardena was born in Colombo in 1931, to a Sinhala father and a British mother, Eleanor Hutton. Her father, Agampodi Torontal Paulus de Zoysa, popularly known as A. P. de Zoysa, was a prominent social reformer and academic of Sri Lanka. She studied at the Ladies' College in Colombo and took a BA in Economics at the London School of Economics (LSE) between 1952 and 1955. She was awarded the Certificat d'Etudes Politiques from the Institut d'etudes politiques de Paris (part of Sciences Po) in 1956. Having qualified as a barrister in 1958, she received a PhD from LSE in 1964 for her thesis on industrial relations.

== Career ==
From 1969 until 1985, Jayawardena taught political science at the University of Colombo. She also taught a course on women and development as a visiting scholar at the International Institute of Social Studies in The Hague. In the 1980s, as she travelled between Brussels (where she lived) and The Hague (where she taught) Jayawardena wrote what would become Feminism and Nationalism in the Third World. It is a guide to women's movements in China, Egypt, Iran, India, Indonesia, Japan, Korea, the Philippines, Sri Lanka, Turkey and Vietnam.

Jayawardena wanted to address the "gap about our part of the world" and felt that in order to "discuss the knowledge and status of women today, it is important to know what they have gained and how." The book was selected for the Feminist Fortnight award in the United Kingdom in 1986. Ms. Magazine called it one of the twenty most important books of the feminist decades in 1992. This book is now regarded as a classic introduction to feminist movements and is widely used in Women's Studies programs around the world. Thirty years after its original publication, it was reissued by Verso Books.

The White Woman's Other Burden, published in 1995, analyzes the actions of white women who challenged the gender roles set by the British occupation of South Asia. Jayawardena specifically looks at the work of Annie Besant, Helena Blavatsky, Katherine Mayo, Mirra Richard and Madeleine Slade.

Jayawardena plays an active role in women's research organizations and civil rights movements in Sri Lanka. She founded the Social Scientists' Association in the 1970s and was still involved with it at the age of 85. It is a group of concerned scholars working on ethnic, gender and caste.

== Selected works ==
=== Books ===
- The Rise of the Labor Movement in Ceylon (1972) North Carolina: Duke University Press
- Feminism and Nationalism in the Third World (1986) London: Zed Books
- The White Woman's Other Burden: Western Women and South Asia During British Rule (1995) New York: Routledge
- (Co-edited with Malathi de Alwis) Embodied Violence Communalising Women's Sexuality in South Asia (1996) London: Zed Books
- From Nobodies to Somebodies: The Rise of the Bourgeoisie in Sri Lanka (1998) Colombo: Social Scientists' Association
- Ethnic and Class Conflict in Sri Lanka: The Emergence of Sinhala-Buddhist Consciousness 1883-1983 (2003) Sri Lanka: Sanjiva Books
- Erasure of the Euro-Asian (2007) Colombo: Social Scientists' Association

=== Articles ===
- "Annie Besant's Many Lives" in Frontline (17 October 1997).
- "The Women's Movement in Sri Lanka 1985-1995, A Glance Back Over Ten Years" (CENWOR, 1995).
- "Sinhala Buddhism and the 'Daughters of the Soil'" in Pravda 1 (May 1992).
- "Some Thoughts on the Left and the 'Woman Question' in South Asia" in Promissory Notes (eds) S. Kruks, R. Rapp and M. Young. (Monthly Review Press, 1989).
- "The National Question and the Left Movement in Sri Lanka" in Facets of Ethnicity (eds) C. Abeysekera and N. Gunasinghe. (SSA, 1987).
- "Feminist Consciousness in the Decade 1975-85" in UN Decades for Women—Progress and Achievements of Women in Sri Lanka (CENWOR, 1986).
- "Bhikkus in Revolt" in Lanka Guardian ( May–July 1979).
- "The Origins of the Left Movement in Sri Lanka" in Modern Ceylon Studies 2 (1971): 195-221.
- "Economic and Political Factors in the 1915 Riots" in Journal of Asian Studies 29 (Feb 1970).
- "Pioneer Rebels among the Colombo Working Class" in Young Socialist (Nov 1968).

== See also ==
- Feminism
- Feminism and Nationalism in the Third World
- Sunila Abeysekera
- Malathi de Alwis
