= Buddhist Republican Party =

- Leader: A. P. de Zoysa
- Founded: 1952
- Ideology: Nationalism

The Buddhist Republican Party (abbreviated BRP) was a nationalist political party in Sri Lanka. The party was founded by A. P. de Zoysa in 1952.

BRP fielded three candidates in the 1952 parliamentary election. The party mustered 3,987 votes (0.17% of the national vote). The election symbol of the party was a flower.
