= Feminism and Nationalism in the Third World =

Book by Kumari Jayawardena

- Author: Kumari Jayawardena
- Subject: Postcolonial feminism
- Publisher: Zed Books
- Publication date: 1986
- ISBN: 978-0-86232-265-6

Feminism and Nationalism in the Third World is a 1986 publication by Sri Lankan author Kumari Jayawardena. Kumari's book has been described as a feminist classic and widely used in gender and women's studies to date as a primer of Third-World Feminism.

The book follows case studies about women at the front line of feminist, socialist and political movements across eleven countries in the East: Egypt, Iran, Turkey, India, Sri Lanka, China, Japan, Korea, the Philippines, Vietnam and Indonesia, that share a history of direct assault and hostility by imperialist regimes interested in subjugating their territory and indirect exploitation in instilling the enslavement schemes of these regimes. These case studies are set against a background of growing nationalism – liberation struggles of the Eastern world to free themselves of their colonizers, which created a common struggle for emancipation between feminist and nationalist movements.

== Background and publication ==
In the 1980s, Kumari was arranging teaching material for the women and development program at the International Institute of Social Studies (ISS), Netherlands as a visiting scholar. At the time, she was working on Feminism in Europe: Liberal and Socialist Strategies with her colleague Maria Mies from ISS.

Kumari felt the lack of a parallel account of women's historical struggles in the 'third world' noting that, "There was a gap about our part of the world"

She compiled research she found at the International Archive for the Women's Movement in Amsterdam concerning the history of women in the third world into a manuscript that she wrote on train rides between The Hague and Brussels The manuscript was first published in 1982 and while Kumari had originally wanted to add pictures, it was printed as a small book and subsequently, used by her students at the ISS. Later, it was picked up by Zed books who expanded and published it in a paperback format on 1 May 1986.

== Synopsis ==
Feminism and Nationalism in the Third World begins by introducing the countries it selects to focus on: Egypt, Iran, Turkey, India, Afghanistan, Sri Lanka, China, Japan, Korea, the Philippines, Vietnam and Indonesia. Kumari analyses how the common history of colonial rule has shaped these countries through similar experiences but also points out the differences in their belief systems: Egypt, Turkey, Iran and Afghanistan share Islamic history; India and Sri Lanka err towards beliefs based on Buddhism; Chinese, Japanese and Korean ideals are rooted in Confucius's philosophy and the Philippines, Vietnam and Indonesia have been dominated by both: Indian and Chinese influences. The distinction in ideologies is important, Kumari suggests, because it's shaped the approaches towards their liberation efforts and the means through which women mobilized to contribute to national liberation efforts.

Kumari explores how the expansion of capitalism through colonisation in these societies led to the creation of a class of 'local bourgeoise' – commission agents, allies of the settlers, traders who were unsatisfied with the terms of asymmetric trading relations and intellectuals and professionals who had studied abroad or at modern schools. The emergence of this new class of locals prompted a rise in nationalist ideas in retaliation to the occupation and economic exploitation of imperialist powers, leading to a rise in early ideas of women's emancipation. She discusses the common strategies through which self-rule was achieved; modernization of societies, demolition of conventional structures such as the ruling monarchies and religious institutions, and lastly, imbuing masses with nationalist sentiments.

Kumari illustrates how these efforts led to the abolishment of sati or widow burning in India, rapid industrialization of Japan resulting in increased economic participation of women who were a cheap form of labour, the installation of Mustafa Kemal Atatürk in lieu of the Ottoman Empire in Turkey – prompting secularization and a ban on the veil, issues such as concubinage and polygamy being raised in Egypt and similarly, the questioning of 'foot-binding' practices in China. Kumari structured the book such that detailed case studies from each country document the development of feminist consciousness by weaving tales of heroic women.

In Turkey, Halide Edib (1883–1964), daughter of the one-time secretary of the Sultan, was a nationalist who was involved in Atatürk's revolution against the Sultanate as a notable public speaker, writer and adviser in Atatürk's army and is still remembered as the "most visible woman of the revolution" owing to the scrutiny and applaud she faced as the daughter of a notable palace official opposing the system.

Huda Sharawi, founder of the Egyptian Feminist Union, cast off her veil into the sea on her return to Egypt in 1924 from the International Conference of Women in Rome – a move that caused a scandal among the nobility of Egypt as she was the wife of a prominent pasha. She launched the French journal L'Egyptienne in 1925. A decade later, she lectured on women's oppression and their role in society and called for an end to polygamy at the American University in Cairo and her speech was circulated in the Arabic speaking world through print – much to the dismay of two Sheiks from Al-Azhar University who protested.

Saronjini Naidu (1879–1949), daughter of a Bengali college principal, was educated at a university in Madras and later in Cambridge. On her return to India, she broke societal norms of marrying within caste and state by marrying a South Indian doctor. In a few years, she established herself as a noteworthy poet and rhetor. In 1914, she met Gandhi in England and became his devout follower in the following years. She served as a prominent speaker for the Indian National Congress for years, and campaigned alongside Gandhi during significant moments of sub-continental history: Gandhi's non-cooperation movement in 1920, the Salt March in 1930, the Round Table Conferences in London in 1931 and was one of the activists jailed during the 'Quit India' movement of 1942. In 1926, she had made history by being the first woman president of Congress.

Soranjini Naidu's sister-in-law, Kamaladevi Chattophadhyay, was an even more radical feminist, socialist and political reformer. Like other nationalists of the time, Kamaladevi had also been to jail for her participation in the activities of the Indian National Movement. She was influential not only as a nationalist but had met European feminists and drew her inspiration from women's movements across the Western world and was a member of the Congress Socialist Party, stating at a conference in Meerut: "Rather than running away from the Congress, calling it bourgeoisie', socialists should...prevent the leadership from converting it into a bourgeoisie party". Inspired by torchbearers like Saronjini and Kamaladevi, ordinary women were also active participants in the struggle for liberation in the uprising against the British in India; an astonishing 17,000 of the 80,000 arrests made during the salt satyagraha were women.

In Indonesia, Suwarni Pringgodigdo founded the Isteri Sedar ('The Alert Woman') movement in 1930. By 1932, this had become a large political movement that urged for improvements of the conditions of working-class women, remodelling of a uniform education system for the country, women's education and participation in politics, and a strict stance on issues such as polygamy and prostitution. Amongst the notable allies of Isteri Sedar was Sukarno, who was a dedicated supporter of women's rights. In January 1931, Isteri Sedar participated in a convention of Asian women in Lahore and in June 1931, hosted a conference in Jakarta which was focused on inspiring action against the issue of polygamy – calling the attention of the Muslim world to emulate the modernisation practices of Mustapha Kemal in reforming Turkey and protecting the rights of women through abolishing polygamy.

The effects of political and social reforms regarding the women's question were far reaching; tales of the movements of Turkish feminists reached Afghanistan, Egypt and other Muslim countries – particularly, women in these countries looked to Turkey as an example for the issue of polygamy. The Kabo reforms in Korea, which banned child marriage and gave widows the legal right to remarry, were inspired by Japan. The Federation of Indonesian Women's Association acknowledged the influence of Indian, Persian, Turkish and Chinese feminist movements on liberation movements in their country at the conference in Lahore in 1931. The interconnectedness of these movements has been impressed upon throughout Kumari's work.

== Central argument ==
Kumari explores two central themes through this comparative narrative; first, she debunks the Eurocentric belief that feminism is not indigenous to Asia and Africa but rather a western 'import'. She has emphasised that a political account on women's struggles in the East is necessary for both: a Western audience that is ignorant about the existence of a rich history of women's emancipation in the East, and the women of these countries who are unaware of the role in liberation struggles of their ancestors and great-grandmothers.

Second, she challenges the leftist view that women are liberated through entering the labour force and access to education – claiming that women cannot be liberated unless they achieve political, social and economic equality en masse. It is argued that while most feminist movements in the East apparently improved the status of women in these societies through increased participation in politics and commerce, feminist consciousness did not develop to the extent of improving women's conditions irrespective of class or in questioning their oppression in the family.

In the introduction, Kumari identifies the limitations of her work: the lack of research regarding certain countries as opposed to others, the limited scope of study of the lower and working-class women's role in emancipation efforts and how little is known about the role of women in pre-colonial, pre-capitalist societies.

== About the author ==
Kumari Jayawardena was born in 1931. She credits her family as the source of her early interest in Leftists politics; her father Dr A. P. de Zoysa was a member of the State Council and her mother Eleanor Hutton came from a family of strong feminists, socialists and anti-colonist. Her grandmother, Sarah Bewick, was a suffragette. She was senior Fellow of the Institute of Graduate Studies at University of Colombo, Sri Lanka in 2006.

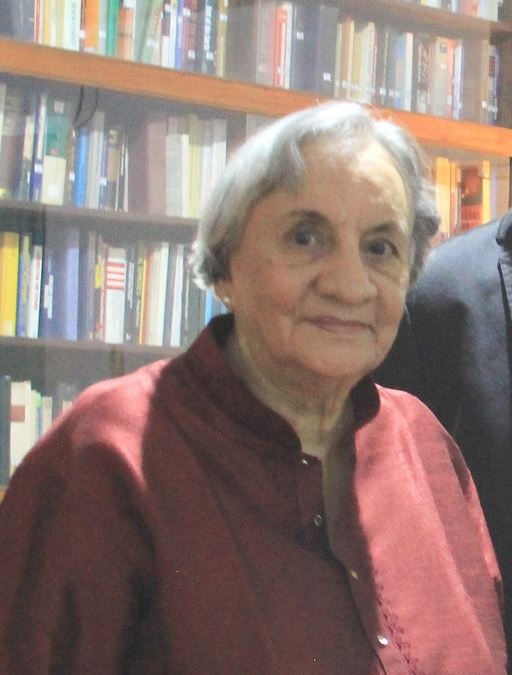
Kumari Jayawardena at home in Colombo in 2018

Kumari defines her life and work as based on the ideals of Marxism, feminism and secularism. Her published works include The Rise of the Labour Movement in Ceylon; Ethnic and Class Conflicts in Sri Lanka; Feminism and Nationalism in the Third World; The white Woman's other Burden; Nobodies to Somebodies: The Rise of the Bourgeoisie in Sri Lanka and The Erasure of the Euro-Asian.

== Formats ==
The book has been published in paperback, hardcover, e-book and a kindle edition:

Paperback:

- Feminism and Nationalism in the Third World (1986). Zed Books. ISBN 978-0-86-232265-6
- Feminism and Nationalism in the Third World (2016). Verso Books. ISBN 9781784784294
- Feminism and Nationalism in the Third World (1986). Kali for Women. ISBN 9788185107059

Hardcover:

- Feminism and Nationalism in the Third World (1986). Zed Books. ISBN 9780862322649

E-book:

- Feminism and Nationalism in the Third World (2016). Verso Books. ISBN 9781784784317

Kindle editions:

- Feminism and Nationalism in the Third World (2016). Verso Books. ASIN B0174PMR9U
- Feminism and Nationalism in the Third World (2016). Verso Books. ASIN B01I2YJUWY

Arabic version:

- Feminism and Nationalism in the Third World (2016). الرحبة للنشر والتوزيع سورية. ISBN 9789933914592

== Academic reception ==
Feminism and Nationalism in the Third World was reviewed by Caroline Ramazanoglu for the Women's Studies International Forum who criticizes the lack of in-depth research regarding certain countries as opposed to others and how information is organised in a scattered manner in certain chapters but attributes this to the broad range of countries covered. Another review in the Journal of Comparative Family Studies criticizes how certain chapters such as Iran and Afghanistan are brief while others such as China and India are more detailed and thorough. The review points to the historic significance of upper and middle-class women's access to literature in influencing the contents of the book and the work is further criticized for a lack of explicit explanation regarding the interconnected of the economy, the politics and the family. However, it is acknowledged that Kumari has forewarned about the flaws of her work and she is praised for her success in writing a foundational piece of literature that successfully challenges the Eurocentric view of feminism and sets a precedence for future scholars regarding research on post-colonial feminism. According to English socialist feminist Sheila Rowbotham, Feminism and Nationalism in the Third World "remains the best introduction to the history of women's movements in Turkey, Egypt, Iran, India, Sri Lanka, Indonesia, the Philippines, China, Vietnam, Korea and Japan".

== Legacy ==
Feminism and Nationalism in the Third World won the Feminist Fortnight Award in the UK and was chosen as one of the top twenty Feminist Classics by Ms. Magazine. It was published by Verso as a part of its feminist classic series in 2016 with a foreword by Rafia Zakaria.
