= Rathgama Electoral District =

Electoral district in Galle District, Sri Lanka

Rathgama electoral district was an electoral district of Sri Lanka between March 1960 and February 1989. The district was named after the town of Rathgama in Galle District, Southern Province. The 1978 Constitution of Sri Lanka introduced the proportional representation electoral system for electing members of Parliament. The existing 160 mainly single-member electoral districts were replaced with 22 multi-member electoral districts. Rathgama electoral district was replaced by the Galle multi-member electoral district at the 1989 general elections.

== Members of Parliament ==
Key

Independent SLFP UNP

| Election | Member | Party | Term |
|---|---|---|---|
| 1960 (March) | M. P. de Zoysa | MEP | |
| 1960 (July) | M. P. de Zoysa | MEP | |
| 1961 by-election | Edwin Tillekeratne | SLFP | |
| 1965 | Edwin Tillekeratne | SLFP | |
| 1970 | M. G. Mendis | LSSP | |
| 1977 | Edwin Tillekeratne | UNP | |

== Elections ==
=== 1960 (March) Parliamentary General Election ===
Results of the 4th parliamentary election held on 19 March 1960:

| Candidate | Party | Symbol | Votes | % |
|---|---|---|---|---|
| M. P. de Zoysa | | Hand | 7,700 | 29.84 |
| Norman Waidyaratne | | Elephant | 6,938 | 26.89 |
| M. G. Mendis | | Star | 5,781 | 22.41 |
| Barbet de Silva | | Key | 3,874 | 15.01 |
| Sampson Senanayake | | Umbrella | 1,183 | 4.59 |
| M. J. Mendis | | Flower | 189 | 0.73 |
| Valid Votes | | | 25,665 | 99.47 |
| Rejected Votes | | | 136 | 0.53 |
| Total Polled | | | 25,801 | 100.00 |
| Registered Electors | | | 33,492 | |
| Turnout | | | | 77.04 |

=== 1960 (July) Parliamentary General Election ===
Results of the 5th parliamentary election held on 20 July 1960:

| Candidate | Party | Symbol | Votes | % |
|---|---|---|---|---|
| M. P. de Zoysa | | Hand | 11,583 | 47.12 |
| Norman Waidyaratne | | Elephant | 9,390 | 38.20 |
| T. W. Panditha | | Cartwheel | 2,390 | 9.72 |
| K. G. P. Jayatilake | | Eye | 1,121 | 4.56 |
| Valid Votes | | | 24,484 | 99.61 |
| Rejected Votes | | | 97 | 0.39 |
| Total Polled | | | 24,581 | 100.00 |
| Registered Electors | | | 33,492 | |
| Turnout | | | | 73.39 |

=== 1961 Parliamentary By Election ===
Following the resignation of M. P. de Zoysa, who accepted a position in the senate, a by election for the seat was held on 29 March 1961:

| Candidate | Party | Symbol | Votes | % |
|---|---|---|---|---|
| Edwin Tillekeratne | | Hand | 10,061 | 46.95 |
| Norman Waidyaratne | | Elephant | 9,646 | 45.01 |
| M. G. Mendis | | Star | 6,816 | 31.80 |
| K. Justin de Silva | | Cartwheel | 512 | 2.39 |
| Valid Votes | | | 21,347 | 99.61 |
| Rejected Votes | | | 84 | 0.39 |
| Total Polled | | | 21,431 | 100.00 |
| Registered Electors | | | 33,492 | |
| Turnout | | | | 63.99 |

=== 1965 Parliamentary General Election ===
Results of the 6th parliamentary election held on 22 March 1965:

| Candidate | Party | Symbol | Votes | % |
|---|---|---|---|---|
| Edwin Tillekeratne | | Sun | 15,696 | 47.68 |
| M. G. Mendis | | Star | 14,813 | 44.99 |
| M. P. de Zoysa | | Lamp | 2,545 | 7.73 |
| Valid Votes | | | 32,727 | 99.42 |
| Rejected Votes | | | 191 | 0.58 |
| Total Polled | | | 32,918 | 100.00 |
| Registered Electors | | | 40,242 | |
| Turnout | | | | 81.80 |

=== 1970 Parliamentary General Election ===
Results of the 7th parliamentary election held on 27 May 1970:

| Candidate | Party | Symbol | Votes | % |
|---|---|---|---|---|
| M. G. Mendis | Lanka Sama Samaja Party | Star | 24,644 | 64.79 |
| Edwin Tillekeratne | United National Party | Elephant | 13,017 | 34.22 |
| Hemachcndra Godage | | Scales | 152 | 0.4 |
| H. K. Martin Mendis Rajapakse | | Cockerel | 120 | 0.32 |
| Valid Votes | | | 37,933 | 99.73 |
| Rejected Votes | | | 102 | 0.27 |
| Total Polled | | | 38,035 | 100.00 |
| Registered Electors | | | 43,536 | |
| Turnout | | | | 87.36 |

=== 1977 Parliamentary General Election ===
Results of the 8th parliamentary election held on 21 July 1977:

| Candidate | Party | Symbol | Votes | % |
|---|---|---|---|---|
| Edwin Tillekeratne | United National Party | Elephant | 22,486 | 53.25 |
| M. G. Mendis | | Star | 15,734 | 37.26 |
| M. P. de Zoysa | | Eye | 3,449 | 8.17 |
| E. H. Panditharatne | | Scales | 446 | 1.06 |
| Valid Votes | | | 42,115 | 99.73 |
| Rejected Votes | | | 113 | 0.27 |
| Total Polled | | | 42,228 | 100.00 |
| Registered Electors | | | 48,840 | |
| Turnout | | | | 86.46 |
