= Edwin Tillekeratne =

Ceylonese politician (born 1920)

Don Edwin Tillekeratne (born 20 July 1920) was a Ceylonese politician. Former Deputy Minister of Parliamentary Affairs and Sports and the member of parliament for Rathgama.
