= Udugama (Galle district) =

- Town
- Location in Sri Lanka
- Coordinates: 6°12′40″N 80°20′20″E
- Country: Sri Lanka
- Province: Southern Province
- District: Galle District
- Time zone: UTC+5:30 (Sri Lanka Standard Time)

Udugama is a small town in Sri Lanka. It is located in Galle District of the Southern Province.

== See also ==
- List of towns in Southern Province, Sri Lanka
