= Arthur de Zoysa =

Ceylonese politician

Garumuni Arthur Wickremaratne de Zoysa (?- 1949) was a Ceylonese politician. He was elected to the first Parliament of Ceylon in 1947 representing the United National Party as the second member for the Ambalangoda-Balapitiya electorate.
