= Dingiri Bandara Welagedara =

Sri Lankan politician (1915–1989)

Hon. Dingiri Banda Welagedara

1st Governor of North Central Province
- In office May 1988 – May 1989
- Preceded by: Office created
- Succeeded by: E. L. Senanayake

Member of the Ceylonese Parliament for Kurunegala
- In office 1952–1956
- Preceded by: Herbert Sri Nissanka
- Succeeded by: D. B. Monnekulama
- In office 1965–1970
- Preceded by: Jayah Pathirana
- Succeeded by: P. Wijesinghe
- In office 1977–1988
- Preceded by: P. Wijesinghe
- Succeeded by: seat abolished

Personal details
- Born: 31 October 1915 Polgahawela, Sri Lanka
- Died: 2 April 1989 (aged 73)
- Party: United National Party
- Education: Ananda College, Colombo; Nalanda College, Colombo; St. John's College, Jaffna

Dingiri Banda Welagedera (31 October 1915 – 2 April 1989), also known as D. B. Welagedera, was the deputy minister of plan implementation and minister a former member of Parliament representing Kurunegala District. Welagedera served as the 1st governor of North Central Province. He was appointed in May 1988 and was governor until May 1989. He was succeeded by E. L. Senanayake.

Born on 31 October 1915 at Panaliya, Polgahawela, as Welagedara Mudiyanselage Dingiri Banda Welagedera was the only child of the family. He was educated at Ananda College, Colombo, Nalanda College, Colombo and at St. John's College, Jaffna before entering Colombo Law College. He joined government service in the first batch of divisional revenue officers that replaced the native headmen system. He was elected the president of the Divisional Revenue Officers' Association.

He resigned from government service to contest the 1952 general election from the United National Party from the Kurunegala District. He was elected to the House of Representatives defeating Herbert Sri Nissanka. He contested the July 1960 general election but lost to D. B. Monnekulama, but was successful in the 1965 general election and again defeated Monnekulama in the 1977 general election. He served as Parliamentary Secretary to the Minister of Nationalised Services from 1965 to 1970 and was appointed Deputy Minister of Plan Implementation in 1977. He served as Governor of the North Central Province from May 1988 to May 1989.

He died on 2 April 1989 and his body was donated to the Colombo Medical College. The Welagedara Stadium and the Welagedara Ayurveda Hospital has been named after him.

== See also ==
- List of political families in Sri Lanka

Political offices
Preceded by Office created	Governor of North Central Province; 1988–1989	Succeeded by E. L. Senanayake
