= Norman Waidyaratna =

Ceylonese politician

Norman James Waidyaratna (born 20 February 1917) was a Ceylonese politician. Former Deputy speaker and chairman of committees of the Parliament of Sri Lanka and the member of parliament for Balapitiya.

He first contested from the Rathgama Electoral District unsuccessfully in the March 1960 parliamentary election, July 1960 parliamentary election and a by election in 1961. However, he successfully contested the 1977 parliamentary election from Balapitiya.
