= A. P. de Zoysa =

Sri Lankan social reformer, academic and lawyer

Honourable A. P. de Zoysa MSC
- ඒ. පී. ද සොයිසා

Member of the State Council of Ceylon for Colombo South
- In office 1936–1947

Personal details
- Born: Agampodi Torontal Paulus de Zoysa; 5 April 1890 Ambalangoda, British Ceylon
- Died: 26 May 1968 (aged 78) Colombo, Sri Lanka
- Spouse: Eleanor Hutton
- Children: Kumari Jayawardena
- Education: Mahinda College; Wesley College, Colombo
- Alma mater: University of London
- Occupation: Social reformer, Academic, Buddhist scholar

Agampodi Torontal Paulus de Zoysa (5 April 1890 – 26 May 1968: ඒ. පී. ද සොයිසා), popularly known as A. P. de Zoysa, was a Sri Lankan social reformer, pre-colonial era politician and a Buddhist scholar.

== Early life ==
A. P. De Zoysa was born on 5 April 1890 in Randombe, Ambalangoda in the Southern province of British Ceylon (now Sri Lanka). Initially he was known as Agampodi Torontal de Zoysa, but later changed his name from Torontal to Paulus. His parents died in an epidemic when he was eleven, and thereafter he was brought up by his grandmother. He started his education in the nearby historic temple, the Maha Samudraramaya, and then received his primary education at the Wesley Sect School in Randombe and Rajapaksa College.

Later in 1902, he moved to Wesley College in Colombo. De Zoysa was not only a good student but also a keen cricketer, artist and actor. In 1907, he was admitted to Mahinda College, Galle where he came under the influence of its principal, the famous Theosophist and Pali scholar Frank Lee Woodward. He passed the 1910 Cambridge Senior Examination, also received a Certificate in Art. In the same year, he taught at Mahinda College for three months as an assistant to the Principal, Woodward. Appointed to Dharmaraja College, Kandy in 1911, Zoysa moved to several schools with the intention of earning a higher salary, and made sure to save most of his salary for a future purpose. While still a teacher, he passed the London Matriculation Examination in 1917.

== Career ==
Then he taught for a few years at Ananda College, Colombo and at Royal College Colombo. In 1921 he went to England and continued his higher education. In London he supported himself by coaching overseas students, and his wide social circle included the artist William Roberts, who painted his portrait. In 1927 he qualified as a barrister. Zoysa became interested in postgraduate studies and enrolled at the University of London in 1928 to pursue a PhD in Anthropology. After taking an external London degree, in 1927 he was called to the Bar at Gray's Inn, and in 1929 he obtained a PhD in anthropology at London University for a dissertation on 'Observances and Customs in Sinhalese Villages' under the supervision of Prof. C. G. Seligman and T. G. Joyce.

With his wife, née Eleanor Hutton, whom he had met at the Buddhist mission in London and married in 1929, in 1934 de Zoysa returned to Sri Lanka, and began work as a lawyer. He also served as an External Lecturer at University College. He was elected to represent Colombo South in 1936, and he continued to serve in the State Council (as an independent) until 1947. Causes which he supported included opposition to the death penalty, anti-dowry legislation, and improved state education. For many years he was also a municipal councillor in Colombo, taking up local issues and campaigning to improve the city's amenities.

In 1939 de Zoysa bought a printing press, and began to produce a series of educational books in Sinhala; he also edited a weekly paper, the Dharmasamaya. But his greatest project, which took over twenty years, with help from Buddhist scholars, was to publish a translation of the whole Tripitaka canon of Buddhist scripture into simple Sinhala; this eventually ran to forty-eight volumes. A concise edition, in about ten volumes, was incomplete at his death. He also compiled and printed English–Sinhala and Sinhala-English dictionaries.

== Later life ==
He died, aged seventy-eight, on 26 May 1968. He and his wife had one child, the feminist scholar Kumari Jayawardena. In March 2009 Sri Lanka Post issued a postage stamp commemorating A. P. De Zoysa's life as a social reformer and as a Buddhist scholar. A biography by Kumari Jayawardena, A. P. de Zoysa: Comabative Social Democrat and Buddhist Reformer in 20th Century Sri Lanka (Sanjiva Books, Colombo, Sri Lanka), was published in 2012.
