= Ian de Zoysa =

Sri Lankan politician

Hondamuni Ian Aloysious de Zoysa was a Sri Lankan politician.

At the 2nd parliamentary elections in 1952 de Zoysa, representing the United National Party, was elected as one of the two representatives for the Ambalangoda-Balapitiya electorate. He ran again in the 1956 parliamentary elections, this time as the Sri Lanka Freedom Party candidate but failed to retain his seat.

The Ambalangoda-Balapitiya electorate was subsequently split into two single member electorates with de Zoysa contesting the newly created Balapitiya electorate at the 4th parliamentary election in March 1960, again representing the Sri Lanka Freedom Party. He failed to get elected polling only 24.2% of the vote.
