= Balapitiya =

Human settlement in Southern Province, Sri Lanka

Balapitiya බලපිටිය பலபிட்டிய
- Town
- Location within Sri Lanka
- Country: Sri Lanka
- Province: Southern Province
- Elevation: 3 m (9.8 ft)
- Time zone: UTC+5:30 (Sri Lanka Standard Time Zone)
- Post code: 80550
- Area code: 091

Balapitiya is a coastal town, in south west Sri Lanka. It is located in the Southern Province in Sri Lanka. It is situated 80 km (50 mi) south of Colombo, about a two-hour drive from the capital. It is the nearest town to the Maduganga River and the closest town near the Madu Wetland. Balapitiya is connected by boat, train and tuktuk from nearby coasts.

Religious composition in Balapitiya DS Division according to 2024 census data is Buddhists 66,727, Hindus 149, Islam 1,109, Roman Catholics 101, Other Christians 56, Others 8.
