= Baddegama =

Baddegama බද්දේගම නගරය බද්දේගම
- Town
- Nickname: Baddegama Town
- Location in Sri Lanka
- Coordinates: 6°10′N 80°10′E
- Country: Sri Lanka
- Province: Southern Province
- District: Galle District

Government
  - Type: Baddegama Pradeshiya Sabha

Area
  - Total: 111 km^{2} (43 sq mi)

Population (85,535)
  - Total: 85,535
  - Density: 708/km^{2} (1,830/sq mi)
- Time zone: UTC+5:30 (Sri Lanka Standard Time)
- Main Post Office : Baddegama: 80200
- Area code: 091
- Website: http://baddegama.ds.gov.lk

Baddegama is a main town in Galle District, Southern Province, Sri Lanka. Baddegama is accessible from the E01 Southern Expressway, and is located 1.8 km (1.1 mi) from the Baddegama Expressway Inter Exchange and 102 km (63 mi) from Colombo.

== Economy ==
The main livelihood for the town was paddy cultivation but that has now changed to tea cultivation as well as rubber, coconut, cinnamon, pepper and minor export cultivation.

== Religion ==
Religion in Baddegama DS Division (2012)
1. Buddhist (96.3%)
2. Hindu (2.18%)
3. Muslim (0.02%)
4. Roman Catholic (0.61%)
5. Other Christian (0.87%)
6. Other (0.01%)

== Education ==
Baddegama has five main schools.

- Christ Church Boys' College (National School)
- Christ Church Girls' School (National School)
- St Anthony's College (Secondary School)
- Rathnasara College
- Roman Catholic College

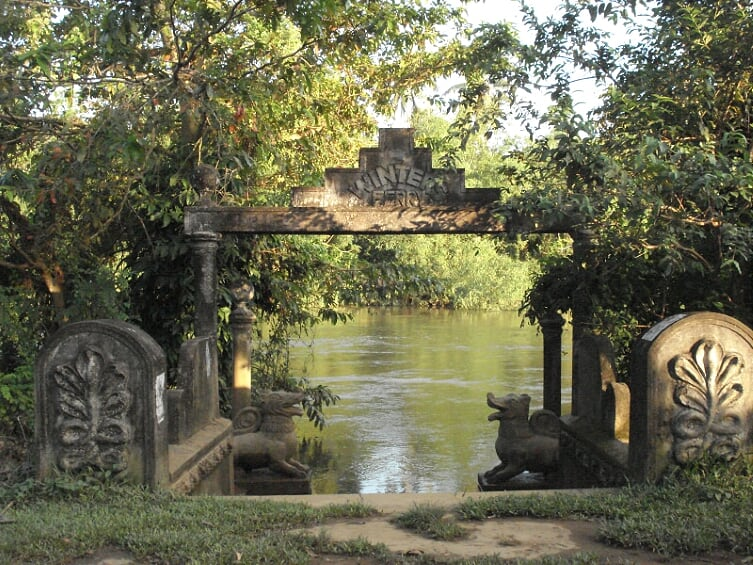
Winter Ferry, Baddegama

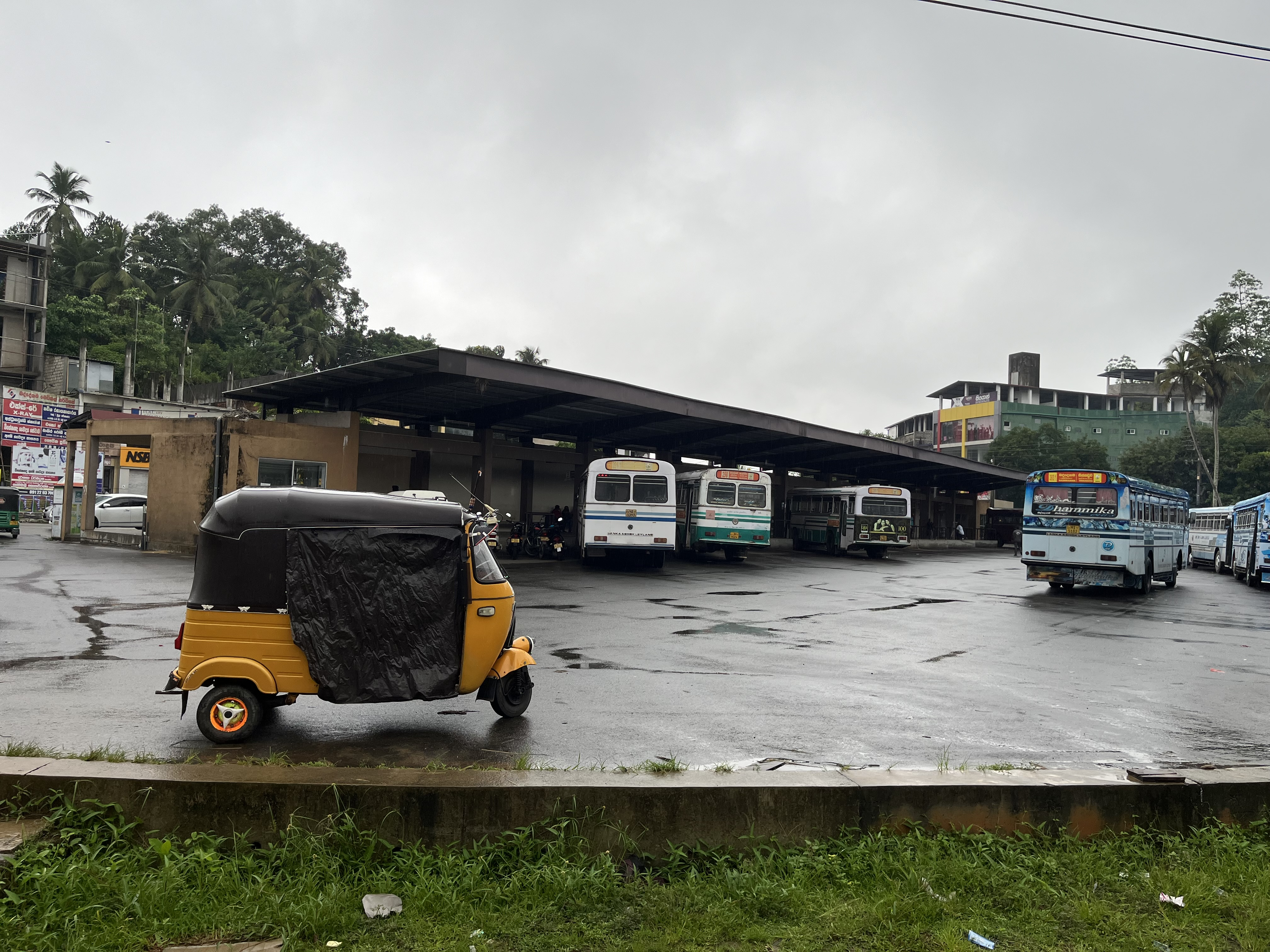
Bus stand, Baddegama

== Transport ==
Baddegama Main Central Bus-stand

Colombo, Galle including more than 30 destination Bus route's Start from Baddegama main bus-stand.

== See also ==
- List of towns in Southern Province, Sri Lanka
