= 1952 Ceylonese parliamentary election =

- 24–30 May 1952

95 seats in the House of Representatives of Ceylon 48 seats were needed for a majority
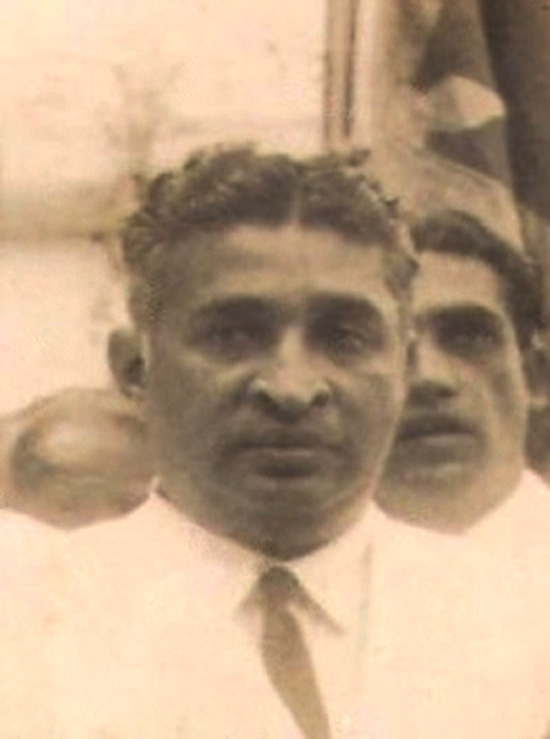

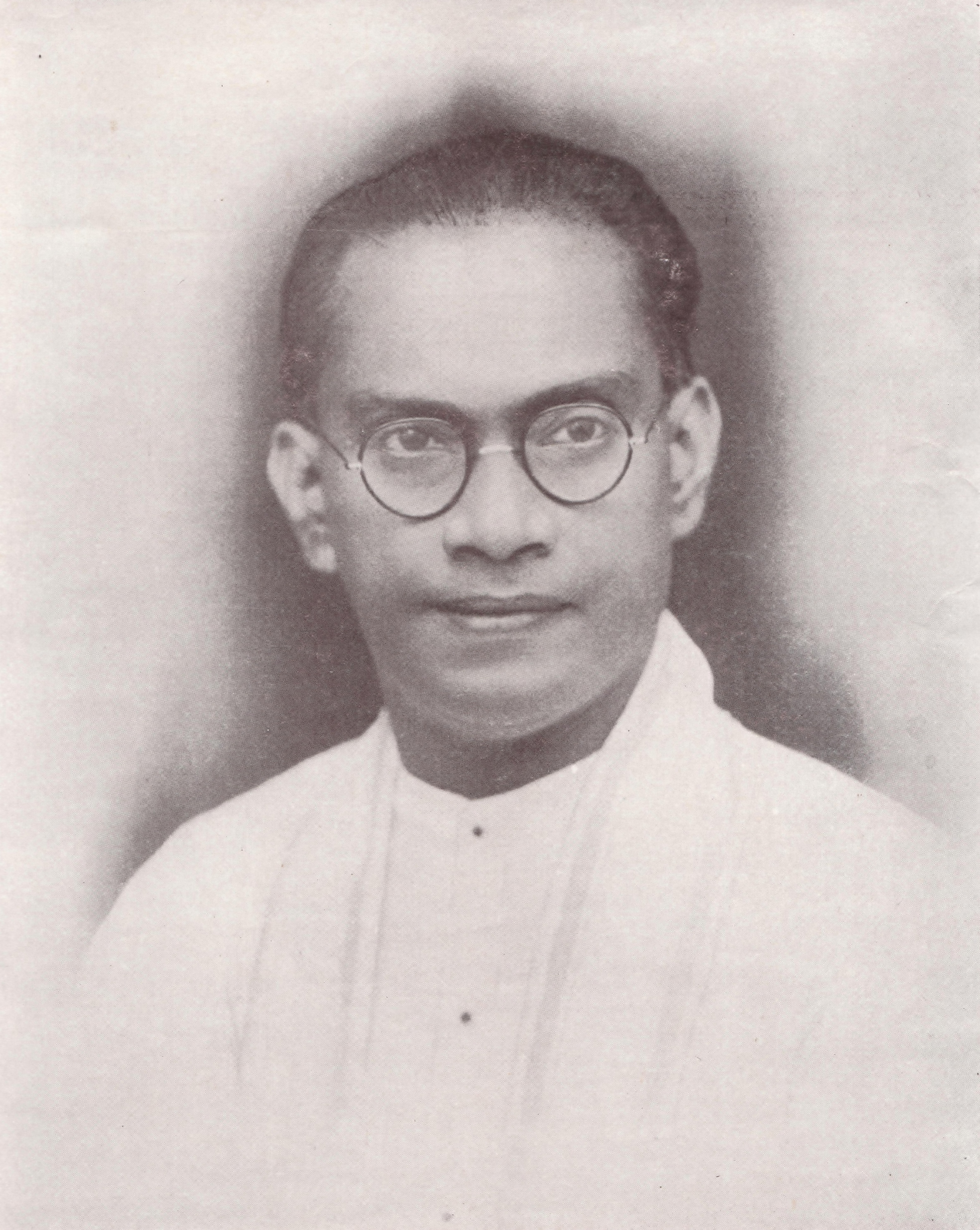

	First party	Second party	Third party
Leader	Dudley Senanayake	S. W. R. D. Bandaranaike	N. M. Perera
Party	UNP	SLFP	LSSP
Leader since	1952	1951	1945
Leader's seat	Dedigama	Attanagalla	Ruwanwella
Last election	39.81%, 42 seats	Did not exist	10.81%, 10 seats
Seats won	54	9	9
Seat change	▲12	New party	▼1
Popular vote	1,026,005	361,250	305,133
Percentage	44.08%	15.52%	13.11%
Swing	▲4.27pp	New party	▲2.30pp
Prime Minister before election
Dudley Senanayake
UNP
Prime Minister after election
Dudley Senanayake
UNP

Parliamentary elections were held in Ceylon in 1952. It is notable for being the second and final election overseen and administered by the Department of Parliamentary Elections before its merger in 1955.

== Background ==
Prime Minister D.S. Senanayake died in March 1952, and was succeeded by his son, Dudley. The national wave of mourning for Ceylon's first prime minister greatly boosted the UNP's fortunes.

The 1952 election was the first contested by the Sri Lanka Freedom Party, which had broken away from the UNP on a platform of Sinhala nationalism, and the Illankai Tamil Arasu Kachchi (Federal Party), which split from the All Ceylon Tamil Congress over joining the UNP government.

== Results ==
Because the estate Tamils had been stripped of their citizenship by the Senanayake government, the Ceylon Indian Congress, which most of them had supported, was eliminated from Parliament and the Lanka Sama Samaja Party lost seats. The UNP won a majority, mainly at the cost of the CIC and the LSSP.

Party	Votes	%	Seats
United National Party	1,026,005	44.08	54
Sri Lanka Freedom Party	361,250	15.52	9
Lanka Sama Samaja Party	305,133	13.11	9
CPC–VLSSP	134,528	5.78	4
All Ceylon Tamil Congress	64,512	2.77	4
Illankai Tamil Arasu Kachchi	45,331	1.95	2
Republican Party	33,001	1.42	0
Ceylon Labour Party	27,096	1.16	1
Buddhist Republican Party	3,987	0.17	0
Independents	326,783	14.04	12
Total	2,327,626	100.00	95
Total votes	2,114,615	–	
Registered voters/turnout	2,990,912	70.70	
Source: Nohlen et al.
