= 1977 anti-Tamil pogrom =

Second islandwide Sinhalese-Tamil clash in Sri Lanka

1977 anti-Tamil pogrom in Sri Lanka
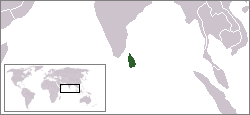
- Location of Sri Lanka
- Location: Sri Lanka
- Date: 12 to 28 August 1977 (+05.30 GMT)
- Target: Primarily Tamils, also Sinhalese
- Attack type: Decapitation, Burning, Stabbing, Shooting, Raping
- Weapons: Knives, Sticks, Fire, Guns
- Deaths: 125 (official) - 300+
- Injuries: 1000+
- Perpetrators: Mostly Sinhalese mobs, UNP led Sri Lankan government, also Tamil mobs; Sinhalese police officers and military personnel to a lesser degree

Sri Lankan Tamils were targeted by a pogrom following the 1977 general elections in Sri Lanka where the Tamil nationalistic Tamil United Liberation Front won a plurality of minority Tamil votes. In the elections, the party stood for secession. An official government estimate put the death toll at 125, whereas other sources estimate that around 300 Tamils were killed by Sinhalese mobs. Human rights groups, such as the UTHR-J, accused the newly elected UNP-led government of orchestrating the violence.

The pogrom began with policemen threatening and assaulting Tamils at a carnival in Jaffna, which led to a clash between the two groups. This led to further police violence against Tamils in Jaffna, followed by Tamil violence against Sinhalese in the city. Following the Jaffna incidents, violence erupted throughout the country.

Edmund Samarakkody in Workers Vanguard reported:

"As on previous occasions, what took place recently was not Sinhalese-Tamil riots, but an anti-Tamil pogrom. Although Sinhalese were among the casualties, the large majority of those killed, maimed and seriously wounded are Tamils. The victims of the widespread looting are largely Tamils. And among those whose shops and houses were destroyed, the Tamils are the worst sufferers. Of the nearly 75,000 refugees, the very large majority were Tamils."

== Background ==
Following Ceylon's independence in 1948, which saw D.S. Senanayake, the first Prime Minister of the island forming a government with a coalition with his United National Party (UNP), the Sinhala Maha Sabha of S. W. R. D. Bandaranaike and the Tamil Congress of G. G. Ponnambalam. This coalition soon fell apart, and Bandaranaike who was elected wave of Sinhalese-Buddhist nationalism, delivered on his election promise by enacting the Sinhala Only Act in 1956, Tamil parties began asking for more power for the North and east of Sri Lanka where Tamils are the majority. In 1957, the Bandaranaike-Chelvanayakam Pact was formed, but later scrapped by then prime minister S. W. R. D. Bandaranaike. Tensions related to the Sinhala Only policy resulted in riots in 1956 and 1958. During the early 1960s, prime minister Sirimavo Bandaranaike ruthlessly enforced the Sinhala Only policy, much to the detriment of the Tamils. In 1965, the new prime minister Dudley Senanayake created the Dudley-Chelvanayakam Pact, which sought to find a compromise on the issues of language, colonization, and devolution. There were modest gains in making Tamil the language of administration in the north and east. However, the regional councils proposed by the pact were not implemented. In 1970, Sirimavo Bandaranaike returned to power and once again enforced a pro-Sinhala-Buddhist policy, marginalizing the Tamils. Despite the communal tensions between Sinhalese and Tamils, there had been no major outbreaks of ethnic violence between the two groups since 1958.

== Events leading up to August 1977 ==
=== Tamil Separatism and the quest for Tamil Eelam ===
As early as 1972, S. J. V. Chelvanayakam had suggested that the Sri Lankan Tamils of the north and east may seek a separate state in response to the discrimination by the Sri Lankan government. In 1974, all major Tamil parties representing Tamils in the North east came under one forum (named as Tamil United Liberation Front - TULF). On 27 July 1975, Alfred Duraiappah, the Mayor of Jaffna and ruling party Sri Lanka Freedom Party (SLFP) orgernizer for Jaffna was shot dead allegally by Velupillai Prabhakaran, the government responded by re-arresting those it imprisoned earlier for anti-state activity, while others fled to India. On 14 May 1976, at the first national convention of the TULF at Vadukoddai, presided over by Chelvanayakam unanimously adopted the political resolution, known as the Vaddukoddai Resolution:

restoration and reconstitution of the Tree Sovereign secular, socialist State of Tamil Eelam based on the right of self-determination inherent to every nation, has become inevitable in order to safeguard the very existence of the Tamil nation in this country

The TULF states in its manifesto for the 1977 general elections attacks the Republican Constitution of 1972, mentions grievances of the Tamils and liberation by the National Assembly of Tamil Eelam formed by Tamil speaking members of the National State Assembly drafting a constitution for the new state and bring it into force "either by peaceful means or by direct action or struggle". According to Sansoni, A. Amirthalingam had explained "that 'peaceful means' meant negotiation, 'direct action' meant Sathyagraha, 'struggle' meant civil disobedience". Amirthalingam intended to form the state of Tamil Eelam through political means by persuading and convincing members of parliament as Sansoni found "that any other method of achieving the separate State is unlawful and unconstitutional". He further states in his report that R. Sampanthan has stated that he took the oath of allegiance perform his duty as a members of parliament and use parliament as a "forum for the vindication and achievement of the objectives of his party, and in order to retain his seat" and does state that his party would not violate the constitution. Sansoni states in his report that during the general election campaign, members of the TULF and its youth front spoke in campaign speeches that "Eelam will be set up, if necessary by resort to violence".

=== Killing of Tamil policemen ===
On 14 February 1977, Police Constable A. Karunandhi of the Kankesanthurai police station was shot by the Liberation Tigers of Tamil Eelam (LTTE), this was followed by the killing of two more Constables of the same name Shanmuganathan in Inuvil Jaffna, they were attached to CID units of police stations in Kankesanthurei and Valvettithurai. PC Karunandhi was detailed for the search for Prabhakaran and Patkunarajah who were suspected in the Duraiappah assassination, while PCs Shanmuganathan were investigating the killing of PC Karunandhi. The killing of PC Karunandhi was a shock to the police and after the killing of Shanmuganathans, Tamil police officers detailed to investigate the militants, requested transfers making it difficult for the police to find Tamil police officers to investigate the Tamil militants. In order to suppress the militants, many Tamil youth were detained and tortured.

=== 1977 General elections ===
G. G. Ponnambalam died in February 1977, followed by Chelvanayakam in April, creating a power vacuum. Chelvanayakam was succeeded by Amirthalingam as the leader of the TULF. On 3 June, after Chelvanayakam's ashes were taken to Trincomalee, a three-day clash between Sinhalese and Tamils in the area resulted in injuries on both sides. While some witnesses saw the August violence as continuation of the June violence, Sansoni maintained they were unrelated.

The 1977 general elections took place on 21 July 1977. The Tamil districts voted almost entirely for the TULF, winning 18 seats in parliament, with the TULF becoming the largest opposition party in Parliament and Amirthalingam becoming Leader of the Opposition. The SLFP was reduced to eight seats and the United National Party won 140 seats, with J. R. Jayewardene, becoming the new Prime Minister.

== St. Patrick's College Carnival ==
On 12 August, four policemen visited a carnival at St. Patrick's College, where they assaulted Mr. Kulanayagam, who asked them for an entry fee. The policemen misbehaved and helped themselves freely to food at food stalls without paying. On the 13th, the same policemen again went to the carnival where they clashed with locals around midnight. Two policemen were injured and hospitalised as a result. The policemen had claimed that they had gone in search of two men wanted for a robbery, this was rejected by Sansoni.

There were different beliefs on how the riots started. Some believe they started when there was a dispute that began when four policemen entered a carnival without tickets. Apparently the policemen were inebriated and proceeded to attack those who asked for tickets. The conflict escalated and the policemen were beaten up by the public and in retaliation the police opened fire.

Others have the view that the carnival incident was a pretext, inquiries revealing that it was conducted in an organized manner and was hence a pre-planned attack.

== The ethnic pogrom ==
What began as a minor police-civilian clash in Jaffna escalated into a nationwide anti-Tamil communal violence. Some elements within the defeated SLFP were accused of fomenting the violence through planned and organized spreading of false rumours against Tamils to destabilize the government. Anti-UNP political motivation was revealed by the Sinhalese rioters who reportedly told their Tamil victims that they were being punished for helping the UNP win the elections. Reports indicated that some sections of the SLFP also participated in the violence.

Walter Schwarz in the Minority Rights Group reported:

The trouble began in Jaffna, capital of the Northern Province, when Sinhalese policemen, believed to have been loyal to the defeated Sri Lanka Freedom Party of Mrs Bandaranaike, acted provocatively by bursting into a Tamil carnival. In the violent altercation that followed the police opened fire and four people were killed. A wave of rioting followed, spreading quickly to the south. The upheaval followed the pattern of previous ones and, as before, there were signs of provocation and concertation. Among 1500 people arrested were several known Sinhalese extremists, accused of instigating violence against Tamils.

Edmund Samarakkody in Workers Vanguard reported:

The outbreak in mid-August (1977) of the anti-Tamil pogrom (the third such outbreak in two decades) has brought out the reality that the Tamil minority problem in Sri Lanka has remained unresolved now for nearly half a century, leading to the emergence of a separatist movement among the Tamils. As on previous occasions, what took place recently was not Sinhalese-Tamil riots, but an anti-Tamil pogrom. Although Sinhalese were among the casualties, the large majority of those killed, maimed and seriously wounded are Tamils. The victims of the widespread looting are largely Tamils. And among those whose shops and houses were destroyed, the Tamils are the worst sufferers. Of the nearly 75,000 refugees, the very large majority were Tamils, including Indian Tamil plantation workers.

According to an official estimate, 125 people were killed during the riots. By ethnicity, the breakdown was 97 Tamils, 24 Sinhalese, 1 Muslim, and 3 of unknown ethnicity. Other sources estimate that around 300 Tamils were killed by Sinhalese mobs.

In a letter addressed to President J. R. Jayewardene, the leader of the main Tamil party, A. Amirthalingam accused Sinhala hoodlums of killing 300 Tamils, raping around 200, and causing injury or displacement to tens of thousands during the pogrom. His wife Mangayarkarasi Amirthalingam emotionally recounted some incidents of rape that occurred during the 1977 pogrom and said "Tamil women could not walk the streets during nights in safety."

The following is a breakdown of the rioting by district as given in the "Report of the Presidential Commission" (1980) and other eyewitness accounts:

=== Jaffna District ===
On 12 August, four policemen visited a carnival at St. Patrick's College, where they assaulted Mr. Kulanayagam, who asked them for an entry free. The policemen misbehaved and helped themselves freely to food at food stalls without paying. On the 13th, the same policemen again went to the carnival where they clashed with locals around midnight. Two policemen were injured and hospitalised as a result. The policemen had claimed that they had gone in search of two men wanted for a robbery, this was rejected by Sansoni.

On 14 August, MPs A. Amirthalingam and V. Yogeswaran reported that several local residents had complained of being assaulted by the police. A policeman was then later shot at and hospitalized. After this, some Tamils had been assaulted by unidentified men, alleged to be police.

On 15 August, a mob of about 100 people were reported to be causing damage to lights and signs near the Jaffna Bus stand. A mob was also reported to have caused damages to the Old Market and assaulted people there. Tamil politicians and members of the public blamed the police for this violence. However, Sansoni said that the evidence was insufficient to apportion blame to the police.

On the morning of the 16th at 5am, MP V. Yogeswaran stated that a number of people came to his house to inform him that 10 policemen in Khakis had set fire to shops in the Old Market at 1.40 AM. The police were also accused of smashing goods and damaging name boards, statues and motor vehicles. Sansoni states that Mr. Joseph, Additional Government Agent received a letter to the Government Agent from three Trade Unions of the Jaffna Kachcheri who complained that "the Police committed atrocities on the innocent public from last night, causing damage to public properties, Normal life has come to a standstill. The officers are unable to travel to their respective work places safely. As a protest against the Police authorities the members of our Unions in all offices in the District have decided to go on strike till the issues involved are satisfactorily resolved. We demand a public inquiry into the whole incident".

On the morning of 16 August, a police inspector attempted to remove the shot policeman from the hospital without following due procedure, and Sansoni speculated that this was the cause of rumors that doctors in Jaffna did not attend to Sinhalese policemen. After this, Jaffna shopkeepers complained that the police were throwing fiery objects at boutiques, but Sansoni claimed that the objects had been set on fire by mobs and placed in the middle of the road, and that the police were merely clearing the road. This is contradicted by another local eyewitness who stated the following:

"In the night of the 15th, word spread that there were fires in the town area and that the Police were setting fire to some shops. The young men rushed to the area. Some of the elders had brought used tyres, piled them up at CSK Junction and set them on fire, creating a barricade so that the Police could not come into our area. I saw some policemen coming there and pulling out the sign-post with the street names. Using the sign-post they lifted a burning tyre by its loop, carried it and threw it on some inflammable material in the Old Market, thus setting it on fire."

During the morning troubles, the police opened fire on crowds and assaulted people. Several Tamil residents accused the police of an engaging in a "reign of terror" by burning and damaging shops. Sansoni refers to five cases of shooting by the Police in which five Tamil civilians, S. Vartharajah, T. Suriyakumaran, S. Kailasapillai, S. Gopalakrishnan and K. Edirimanasingham were wounded by bullets during police firing, none of which proved fatal, although Vartharajah had his right leg amputated as a result. According to UTHR, an additional five civilians were also shot dead by the police. At the same time, Tamil mobs had gone on a rampage against Sinhalese shops, burning and looting them.

On 17 August at 11:00 a.m., a false radio message was sent from the Jaffna Police Station to the I.G.P., Colombo. The message conveyed a fabricated report: "Today, 4 C.T.B. buses have been set on fire. Naga Vihara is under attack. A crowd has gathered at the Railway Station, Jaffna, with intentions to assault incoming passengers. The situation is deemed serious." This false rumour was one of many created to stir up anger amongst the Sinhalese.

There were several attacks on Sinhalese and their properties in Kilinochchi starting on 19 August. A Buddhist temple was burnt by a crowd of 200, and several boutiques and bakeries were burnt. Sinhalese goods whose owners had fled had also been looted. About 20 Sinhalese wadiyas were burnt in Thallady were burned. A few Sinhalese were assaulted by Tamil rioters. Many Sinhalese took refuge in the police station. A Sinhalese baker from Paranthan noted that there were no Sinhalese remaining in that town. Policemen and soldiers in Kilinochchi had attacked Tamil shops and homes.

Sansoni reported that between 15 August and 2 September there were multiple reports of theaft of weapons including guns, rifles and pistols, from Sri Lanka Customs offices in Jaffna and elsewhere. Three stolen guns were detected during transport by a naval party led by a Sub-Lieutenant on 17 August.

=== Anuradhapura District ===
The Kankesanturai-Colombo train was attacked in the early hours of 17 August at Anuradhapura station. A Sinhalese mob attacked the Tamil passengers, brutally assaulting and robbing them. The Tamil station master of the station had his car burned while police did nothing. The army was also uninterested in helping Tamils. Tamil refugees sought refuge in the retiring rooms of the railway station. However, the police constable present refused to defend the refugees and the Tamils were attacked. The superintendent of police (SP) G. W. Liyanage and Major Jayawardene appeared to be gloating about the attacks on Tamils. Eventually, an army squad agreed to defend the Tamils in the retiring room. As more trains came to the station, the Tamil passengers in them were assaulted. Tamils at the Department of Health in Anuradhapura were also attacked by Sinhalese hospital employees despite some police and army protection being afforded to them. Dr. K. N. K. Wijayawardana, the Medical Superintendent at Anuradhapura hospital recounted the violence that had occurred there:

'...a mob of about hundred people armed with iron rods and other weapons had broken the door of the room where the Tamil clerks had taken refuge and attacked them. Most had saved their lives by jumping from the windows, except for a lab technologist (MLT) who was handicapped. He was simply bludgeoned to death. Later I learnt also that the mob after their foul murder at the hospital had planned to march to my quarters and attack the Tamil doctors and their families there.'

At 10:30 PM, SP Liyanage arrived in Anuradhapura from Jaffna and echoed the false radio message circulated earlier by the police in Jaffna, embellishing it with disturbing details: "Chaos in Jaffna, Sinhalese individuals murdered, Sinhalese women subjected to rape on the streets, Buddhist priests under attack, and doctors at the Jaffna hospital neglecting Sinhalese patients." He continued to spread these false rumours throughout the night, introducing macabre variations, such as the claim that Sinhalese women were being nailed to walls in Jaffna. The main killings of Tamils at Anuradhapura followed his arrival.

Tamil houses and shops were burned and looted throughout Anuradhapura city. In these attacks, many Tamils were assaulted and some were killed.

Other areas of the Anuradhapura District were also badly affected. In Maha Iluppallama and Kahatagasdigiliya, Tamil houses and shops were damaged. 5 miles from Rambewa, a Tamil lorry driver was attacked and his fate was unknown. At Horwapathana, several Tamil houses and businesses were set ablaze. When one Tamil man was taken to the police station for protection, he reported that the SI threatened to kill Tamils if his family members in Jaffna were harmed. At Kekirawa, 5 Tamils were killed. 5 miles from the town, a bus was stopped and the Tamil passengers were assaulted and tarred.

Dr Wijayawardana, Medical Superintendent of the Anuradhapura Hospital, states that the hospital received a steady stream of casualties from the violence and when he visited the police station to request protection for the hospital, he found two Cabinet Ministers at the station on a fact finding mission. A police patrol was provided to the hospital, however the female house officers' quarters (used by a Sinhalese doctor) was burnt down before it arrived. That night the hospital was attacked by a mob and a Tamil lab technologist was killed while others escaped to the Superintendent's quarters that was housing the Tamil doctors and their families. As the mob approached the Superintendent's quarters an army truck appeared and packed in front of it and the attackers fled. Bodies were stacking up since there was no inquest. Dr Wijayawardana states that the situation improved and the army became more visisble.

=== Kurunegala District ===
At Ibbankatuwa, recently settled Sinhalese colonists attacked Tamils, setting houses on fire and killed three Tamils, Three Tamils were raped. In Kurunegala town, several Tamil businesses were burned. During attacks on estates, several Tamils were assaulted and some were killed. In Wariyapola, when a Tamil shopkeeper complained about his shop being looted to police, the latter showed no interest in helping and retorted that Sinhalese police officers were being killed in Jaffna. 35-40 Tamils had been assaulted and looted while on the train at Polgahawela. Tamil shops and homes were burned and the Kathiresan temple was set on fire.

At Alawwa, a Tamil shopkeeper was killed during an attack on his shop. When a Tamil man sheltering Tamils in his house called police to report an attack on his house, they hung up on him. The mob invaded the house and attacked the Tamils there, killing two. They then tried to burn alive 3 Tamils who had not been killed, but the Tamils managed to survive. When police and army arrived at the house, they complained that Sinhalese police officers and civilians were butchered in Jaffna. In another case, a Tamil man was nearly burned alive by a mob, and nearby police officers and soldiers did nothing. A Sinhalese friend intervened on the Tamil man's behalf and rescued him.

A train full of Sinhalese thugs arrived at Maho at around 6:30 am on 17 August. It had been delayed at Anuradhapura. The Tamil passengers in the train were assaulted, as were Tamil passengers awaiting the train to Batticaloa. 16 Tamil-owned shops were burnt and 9 shops rented to Tamils were looted. Two Hindu kovils were attacked and damaged. A drunken gang of youths looted the Tamil-owned Walawwawatte estate. A Tamil telephone switch connector overheard a conversation where the HQI of Maho Police station called the Superintendent of Police, he informed him that all Tamil shops were burnt, to which the superintendent replied "good show."

At Galgamuwa, Tamil businesses and houses were also looted and burned. The Pillaiyar temple was also looted. At Migalawa, Tamil engineers were attacked and a Tamil labourer was killed. Before dying, the labourer had shot the mob and the gun was now in possession of the mob. Another Tamil engineer took the gun and used it to keep the mob at bay. An army unit arrived where the attack took place. They took the Tamil man's gun but did not rescue any of the Tamils nor did they challenge the mob. After the army left, a police jeep arrived and dispersed the mob.

=== Galle District ===
In Galle town, violence against Tamils began on 17 August. At the Galle bus stand, Tamils were attacked. One was mutilated to death and a Tamil woman had been raped by 3 men and then had her jewellery taken. Tamil traders had their shops looted and burnt. One trader was stabbed in the abdomen. Violence spread to the estates. At Thalangaha Estate, Tamil hotel workers were slashed with razors by Sinhalese rioters. A crowd of 200 Sinhalese attacked the line rooms and assaulted a Tamil laborer. At the Stock Estate in Udugama, three Tamils were seriously assaulted by a crowd and their jewelry stolen on 22 August. The line rooms at the estate were attacked the next night. A mixed Tamil-Sinhalese family was fired at by a mob at Homadola Estate, Hiniduma. Several of the sons were maimed and one was killed.

=== Mannar District ===
On 17 August, Sinhalese wadiyas were set on fire in Vavunikulam. Many Sinhalese fishermen fled after this.

On 23 August, a Tamil bakery was set on fire about a mile away from the police station in Murunkan. A Tamil watcher of the government farm had been attacked by 2 people who had taken his torch and gun. That night, a Sinhalese family was fired at in Palampitiya. The mother and the eldest son were killed and the two younger sons were injured. P. S. Soosaithasan, M. P. for Mannar, claimed that the motive was not communal as the family had lived in the area without communal issues, though Sansoni doubted this. On 24 August, presumably after news of the attack on the Sinhalese family reached them, the army and police had gone on the rampage in several Tamil villages, burning Tamil shops and houses. 5 Tamils had been shot dead by soldiers.

On 28 August, a lorry of 15 Sinhalese fishermen accompanied by Police Constable Balasunderam returned to Vavunikulam to retrieve their goods. The lorry was fired at by a gang of 20 - 25 Tamils. 5 fishermen and the police constable were killed in the firing. The lorry was then burnt, along with the corpses of the 5 deceased. After this, Sinhalese army personnel had made comments about killing Tamils. The crowd that shot the fishermen at Vavunikulam then went to Tenniyankulam Tank and burnt four Sinhaelse wadiyas. Several Sinhalese police officers, angered by the Vavunikulam shooting, had proceeded to assault Tamils.

=== Colombo District ===
Widespread rioting against Tamils in Colombo by Sinhalese thugs began on 18 August. The mobs burned and looted Tamil homes and businesses. Collectively, Tamil victims lost tens of thousands worth of assets during the riots. Many Tamils were assaulted. Some were very seriously hurt and suffered broken bones, fractures, stab wounds, etc. Tamil train passengers were attacked by Sinhalese co-passengers who invoked false rumors of Tamil atrocities against Sinhalese in Jaffna as their justification. Tamil patients in the Kalubowila hospital were also attacked by Sinhalese mobs. Other Tamils were killed immediately by the mobs or later died of their injuries. A number of Tamil women were raped by the mobs.

Several Tamils working at the Central Mail Exchange in Colombo were assaulted in the early hours of 20 August. The assaulted employees reported the assault to their superiors, and the Chief Postmaster, Postmaster General, and Maradana police arrived at the scene a few hours later. Another round of assaulting of Tamil employees took place, this time in the presence of their superiors and police officers.

Police behaviour in the Colombo District was mixed. Some Tamils note that the arrival and action of police helped to arrest mob violence. Several police officers also transported Tamil victims of assault to the hospital, and police stations held Tamil refugees. However, others report police standing by in cases of mob behavior, and some Tamils complained of police apathy or downright hostility.

=== Matale District ===
Several Tamil houses were attacked throughout Matale by Sinhalese rioters, and many Tamils were hurt. In Kotagoda, a Tamil man was assaulted and his house was looted and burned. His six daughters were gang raped by about 8-9 men. In Pallepola too a Tamil woman was gang raped by a Sinhalese gang. In Asgiriya, several Sinhalese broke into a Tamil woman's home and shot dead her husband and brother. At Sellagamma, a Tamil man was beaten and then shot dead. Another Tamil was killed at Elkaduwa in the Mala Colony. Hindu temples in Ukkuwela and Udupihilla were burned. One Tamil man reported seeing the words "Kill Tamils" in Sinhala painted on buses in Palapathwela.

Anti-Tamil violence in Dambulla flared on 17 August. Several Tamil shops were looted and burned. In three cases, policemen had refused to give protection to the Tamil victims. A Sinhalese mob severely assaulted a Tamil civil engineer. A Tamil man was set on fire but survived.

=== Vavuniya District ===
According to Inspector Muhajireen, there were 185 complaints made during the August riots. On 18 August, a cadjan belonging to two Sinhalese men were set on fire. Though it was not known who did that, H. Q. I. de Silva allegedly called for a retaliatory attack on Tamil boutiques. On the night of 19 August, the bodies of Tamils killed in Anuradhapura were brought to Vavuniya. Following this, all the sheds at the weekly fair were burnt. It was alleged that H. Q. I. de Silva was responsible for this, but he denied the allegation. On the night of 21 August, many shops were set on fire in Vavuniya town. The army and police quelled these disturbances.

In several Sinhalese areas of the Vavuniya District, Tamils had their houses burnt and their goods looted. Several Tamils reported that the army and policemen had attacked them and their properties.

In Mullaitivu, several Sinhalese had been attacked by Tamils. Both Tamils and Sinhalese accused each other of arson. Dozens of wadiyas belonging to Sinhalese fishermen were burnt at Kokkilai. There was a complaint of a case of a Sinhalese women being raped. About 30 Tamil wadiyas were also burnt. By 25 August, the Sinhalese had fled from Mullaitivu, and the incidents subsided. In Devipuram, a crowd of 40 Tamils attacked a Sinhalese couple who were estate workers. The crowd took the two to another location and raped the woman. Their house had been looted.

=== Ratnapura District ===
Beginning on 19 August, Tamils in the estates were attacked. A Sinhalese mob attacked a Tamil family in Dehiowita. A Tamil man was shot, his wife slashed with a sword, and his nephew cut on the back. On the 20th, they were taken to the Deraniyagala police station. In Eheliyagoda, all the Tamil shops in the bazaar were looted and burned. In one case, a Tamil trader was also killed in the fire. A van had also been toppled into a river. In Kiriella, a mob of 200 came to Matuwagala Estate, calling for Tamils to be killed. The Tamil laborers hid, and the mob proceeded to loot the line houses. A laborer was severely hurt, and another sustained Rs. 1,000 in damages. In Ratnapura town, Sinhalese rioters attacked nearly all the 30 Tamil shops, but only 2 were actually burnt. A torch was thrown at a Tamil man who subsequently had to jump into a lake to douse the flames.

=== Matara District ===
On 19 August, a Tamil shop was attacked in Matara town. The Tamil woman and husband running the shop were assaulted, leaving the latter mentally scarred. 3 of their 5 children were burnt by a substance thrown on them. On 20 August, a gang looted, damaged, and burnt the Murugan temple. On 19 August, a Tamil man was stabbed to death by a crowd in Weligama. The police inspector had arrested some of the assailants in that case, and Tamil businessmen were sufficiently assured of their safety that they kept their shops open. All the Tamil shops in Akuressa were burnt and looted. One Tamil employee was injured in the fray.

=== Kandy District ===
Violence erupted on 19 August. Several Tamil houses and shops were looted and burned in Kandy town by Sinhalese mobs. Sinhalese-owned taverns employing Tamils were also attacked. Tamils property was also burned and looted in Ampitiya, Kundasale, and Katugastota. A Tamil estate owner who was driving was pulled out of his car and assaulted. At the Kundasale School of Agriculture, several Tamil employees had their properties looted and burned. A Tamil man had been cut by a mob. A Hindu temple in Katugastota was burned and its priest had his house attacked. Another Tamil man was severely assaulted at Polgolla. A Tamil man was clubbed and stripped, and a Tamil woman was hit with a stick covered with barbed wire. In one case, the police had looked on as the mobs pillaged a shop. At Hindagala, a Tamil man was severely assaulted and later died of his injuries. At Pilimathalawa, buses were stopped and Tamil passengers were assaulted and stripped. At the train station too, Tamils were attacked. A mob of 50 attacked the house of Tamil lecturer at Peradeniya University. The police and army arrested 12 rioters. The rioters were taken to the Theological College but later released. A Hindu temple at Peradeniya University was looted and destroyed. Estates in Kadugannawa, Ulapane, Dolosbage, Nawalapitiya were also attacked by Sinhalese colonists and villagers in the vicinity of the estate. Tamil houses, shops, and factories were attacked and burned.

=== Nuwara Eliya District ===
A Tamil man was attacked near the kachcheri at Nuwara Eliya. When police were called to transport the injured man to the hospital, they claimed that there were neither officers nor vehicles to transport the man. The man later died. At the Ambewela farm, Tamils were attacked. One Tamil had gasoline thrown on him and was injured. They had contacted police to transport them, but the police did not arrive for 3 days. The army eventually took the injured Tamil.

=== Trincomalee District ===
On 19 August, at Kantale, Sinhalese mobs attacked Tamils and their properties. 30 Tamils were killed by the mobs and others were injured. Buses were stopped and their Tamil passengers were attacked. A few Tamils had gone missing and were assumed to be dead. At Nilaveli, a truck with Sinhalese soldiers and civilians fired at a Tamil cultivator and damaged his property. In the same town, a Buddhist temple had been fired at.

A Trincomalee town itself, there was two-sided violence, though most victims were Tamils. On 21 August, a Buddhist monk was attacked by a Tamil mob. A Sinhalese family had been asked to leave the town by a Tamil-speaking man. While fleeing, they were shot at by a Tamil mob, killing three men and injuring a woman. Several other Sinhalese had their homes and shops burnt. A Sinhalese man was assaulted. Not long after the attacks on Sinhalese began, Sinhalese mobs attacked Tamils. Tamil shops and houses were looted and burned. Several Tamils were assaulted. At Palaiyuthu, several Tamils had been attacked and one was killed. At least 12 Tamil houses had been burnt.

=== Kegalle District ===
In Kegalle town, a Hindu temple was attacked and its Tamil watcher was attacked with a razor blade. He was not allowed to go to the hospital since he was Tamil and was tended to by a Sinhalese ayurvedic doctor. Several Tamils and their houses in the estates were attacked by Sinhalese mobs. Two Tamils were cut. At Ambanpiuya Estate, a Tamil woman was gang raped by 3 youths. An 80-year-old man was killed at Karandupona Estate. At the same estate, a worker was killed and two Tamil estate labourers were raped. At Niyandurupola, a mob had attacked a Tamil man and he later died from his injuries.

=== Moneragala District ===
Kataragama saw the looting and burning of two Tamil religious institutions: the Ponnampalam Madam and the spiritual center. In Wellawaya and Moneragala, sugar cane estates owned by Tamils were burned and their houses were looted. In Tanamalwila, a Tamil man's house was burned. When the man and his wife were transported to Wellawaya by police, they were assaulted by a crowd while the police looked on and laughed.

=== Hambantota District ===
A Tamil couple, long-time residents of Walasmulla, had their house and shop attacked by a gang. The shop was looted.

=== Badulla District ===
13 Tamil shops were burnt at Koslanda while armed police nearby did nothing. At Halmadulla, several Tamil families were attacked by a Sinhalese gang. Their assets were stolen and their houses set ablaze. In Haputale, a Tamil-owned estate was attacked by villagers. The store and sugar plantation were burned. A Tamil family was attacked in Kolatenna by a crowd of 20. One son was assaulted and cut with a knife, but he fought back against the mob, injuring a few mobsters, and the mob fled. The son was assaulted by army personnel after the latter found out that the son had fought the mobsters. The father of the family went to the police station and was chased away initially. Several Tamil shops were looted and burned in Diyatalawa following news of violence in Kandy and false rumors thereafter. One shopkeeper accused plainclothes soldiers of participating in the violence. A few Sinhalese shops had been damaged too. A Tamil man was cut in the head and killed. Three Tamil houses were burnt by Sinhalese rioters. Sinhalese villagers had burnt lined rooms at Bandarawela. In Badulla town, a Tamil man was assaulted and his father was cut with an axe by masked assailants when the latter attempted to intervene. Several Tamil houses were burnt by Sinhalese at Welimada.

=== Kalutara District ===
On 21 August, the estate lines at Neboda Estate were attacked and chickens were stolen. A Tamil woman living with her uncle were attacked on 22 August at the same estate. She was dragged away and raped by two men on 22 August when she went to the aid of her uncle who was being stabbed during an attack on the estate lines. At the Neuchatel Estate, Neboda, a mob of youths looted the lines and set 3 rooms on fire. One Tamil man was cut and killed, another was stabbed. In Matugama, Tamil shops and houses were attacked. A Sinhalese crowd attacked line rooms at Matugama Division. A Tamil man was killed during the attack. When the man's son-in-law reported the incident to police, they retorted that the Tamil man's murder was fair as Sinhalese police officers were being killed in Jaffna. Another Tamil was shot and injured.

=== Batticaloa District ===
A Sinhalese woman married to a Tamil man was attacked by a crowd of men in Kalkudah. She had been assaulted, robbed, and stripped of her outer garments.

== Militant activity ==
Taking advantage of the rioting, Tamil militants on 31 August stole Rs 26,000 from the People's Bank branch at Manipay and five rifles from the Sri Lanka Customs office in Jaffna. Around the same time chemicals were stolen from school laboratories, while dynamite was stolen from factories.

== Government response ==
By noon 16 August, W.T. Jayasinghe, Permanent Secretary to the Ministry of External Affairs and Defence; Major General Sepala Attygalle, Army Commander; Stanley Senanayake, Inspector General of Police (IGP) and Ana Seneviratne, Deputy Inspector General of Police (DIG) had arrived in Jaffna by air as a result of telephone calls made by Amirthalingam to the Prime Minister and by Navaratnam to T. B. Werapitiya, Deputy Minister of External Affairs and Defence stating that there has been rioting, Police firing and going berserk. The officials visited the market and had after the fire had been extinguished, held a conference of the residency, which was attended by members of parliament. It was reported that government owned Laksala and Cooperative Wholesale Establishment had been looted, while three Sinhalese owned bakeries were burned along with several police vehicles by mobs. The authorities proposed a curfew, which was rejected by the members of parliament, who feared irresponsible police actition unobserved by the public under the cover of darkness. As such no curfew was imposed. The officials returned to Colombo by air around 3 PM. DIG Seneviratne returned to Jaffna the next day.

Questioned in Parliament on 18 August by Amirthalingam, Prime Minister Jayewardene was defiant, blaming the riots on the TULF:

The vast majority of the people in this country have not got the restraint and the reserve that Members of Parliament, particularly those in the front ranks, have been used to. People become restive when they hear that a separate state is to be formed. Whatever it is, when statements of that type are made, the newspapers carry them throughout the island, and when you say that you are not violent, but that violence may be used in time to come, what do you think the other people in Sri Lanka will do? How will they react? If you want to fight, let there be a fight; if it is peace, let there be peace; that is what they will say. It is not what I am saying. The people of Sri Lanka say that.

An all-island curfew was imposed on 19 August and deployed the military to quell the riots.

=== Presidential Commission of Inquiry ===
President William Gopallawa appointed former Chief Justice Miliani Sansoni, who had served as Chief Justice of Ceylon from 1964 to 1966, as the Commissioner of a Presidential Commission of Inquiry on 9 November 1977 to inquire and report on the events "to ascertain the circumstances and the causes that led to, and the nature and particulars of, the incidents which took place in the Island between the 13th day of August, 1977 and the 15th day of September, 1977". Following his inquiry, Justice Sansoni submitted his report, which was known as the "Sansoni Report" to President Jayewardene in July 1980. The riots were explained in the Sansoni Report in terms of "Sinhalese reaction to Tamil separatist demands, terrorist acts committed in the name of separatism, and anti-Sinhalese statements allegedly made by Tamil politicians in the course of the 1977 general election campaign". The Sansoni Report has been criticized for pro-government bias, being hampered by political interference and for "victim blaming" Tamils.

== Reaction ==
A delegation of seven leading British citizens consisting of Sir John Fostor, David Astor, Robert Birley, Louis Blom-Cooper, James Fawcett, Dingle Foot and Michael Scott expressed their outrage in The Times of 20 September 1977:

Sir, A tragedy is taking place in Sri Lanka: the political conflict following on the recent elections is turning into a racial massacre. It is estimated by reliable sources that between 250 and 300 Tamil citizens have lost their lives and over 40,000 made homeless.[...] At a time when the West is awake to the evils of racialism, the racial persecution of the Tamils and denial of their human rights should not pass without protest. The British have a special obligation to protest, as these cultivated people were put at the mercy of their neighbours less than thirty years ago by the British government. They need our attention and support.

== Aftermath ==
More than 75,000 plantation Tamils became victims of ethnic violence and were forced to relocate to northern and eastern Sri Lanka. The pogrom radicalized Tamil youths, convincing many that the TULF's strategy of using legal and constitutional means to achieve independence would never work, and armed struggle was the only way forward. The outbreak of the pogrom highlighted the TULF's inability to provide safety for the Tamils. It was only after the pogrom the TELO and LTTE, the two major Tamil militant groups, began an active campaign for a separate Tamil Eelam. Sathasivam Krishnakumar, who would later become a leading member of the LTTE under the nom de guerre "Kittu", stated that he joined the LTTE after feeling anguish and anger when he volunteered to help Tamil refugees in Jaffna who fled the south after the 1977 riots. Uma Maheswaran, a TULF activist, joined the LTTE in 1977 and was made the organization's chairman by Velupillai Prabhakaran. Many such Tamil activists began to join various Tamil militant groups to fight for separate statehood.

According to Manogaran, the LTTE increased their campaign of violence against police and army personnel, in turn the armed forces and the police escalated their violence against innocent citizens in order to suppress the youth movement and discourage support for it. Concerned that the 1977 anti-Tamil riots had alienated Tamils community, the government felt the need to appease them. A new constitution was enacted in September 1977, which recognized Tamil as a national language and improved Tamil language provisions for Tamils to have better public sector employment opportunities as a first step. The violence continued even though the government proscribed underground movements such as the Liberation Tiger Movement in Order No. 16 of 1978. On 7 September 1978, Air Ceylon flight 4R-ACJ was bombed by suspected militants, which along with attacks on its security forces and informants compelled the government to pass several harsh legislation, some of which became permanent. The relationship between Tamils and Sinhalese was severely strained, with the risk of another communal disturbance.

== See also ==
- Black July
- Ethnic problem in Sri Lanka
- State terrorism in Sri Lanka
- List of riots and pogroms in Sri Lanka
- List of attacks on civilians attributed to Sri Lankan government forces
