= Kumar Ponnambalam =

Sri Lankan politician (1938-2000)

Maamanithar Kumar Ponnambalam
- குமார் பொன்னம்பலம்

All Ceylon Tamil Congress candidate for President of Sri Lanka
- Election date 20 October 1982
- Opponent(s): J. R. Jayewardene, Hector Kobbekaduwa and others
- Incumbent: J. R. Jayewardene

Personal details
- Born: 12 August 1938
- Died: 5 January 2000 (aged 61)
- Party: All Ceylon Tamil Congress
- Education: King's College London; University of Cambridge
- Profession: Lawyer

Gaasinather Gangaser Ponnambalam (Tamil: காசிநாதர் காங்கேசர் பொன்னம்பலம்: 12 August 1938 – 5 January 2000; known as Kumar Ponnambalam or G. G. Ponnambalam Jr) was a Sri Lankan lawyer and politician. He was the son of G. G. Ponnambalam. As the Leader of the All Ceylon Tamil Congress, he was the party's presidential candidate in 1982.

== Early life and family ==
Ponnambalam was born on 12 August 1938. He was the son of G. G. Ponnambalam, a leading Tamil politician and lawyer, and Rose Alagumani Clough. He was educated at St. Patrick's College, Jaffna and Royal College, Colombo. He studied at Aquinas University College, Colombo before joining King's College London, graduating with a LL.B. degree. He then proceeded to the University of Cambridge, graduating with an MA degree. He was a contemporary of leftist politician Vikramabahu Karunaratne at Cambridge.

Ponnambalam married Yogalakshmi, a surgeon and eldest daughter of T. Murugesapillai, a former Additional Government Agent for Jaffna. They had a daughter (Mirinalini, a doctor) and a son (Gajendrakumar, lawyer and politician).

== Career ==
=== Law ===
Ponnambalam was called to the bar at Lincoln's Inn in 1974. Returning to Ceylon, he started practicing law as an advocate. He was a successful lawyer and became very rich as a result. He learned Sinhala so he could argue his cases in the language.

Ponnambalam became involved in human rights activism in the 1970s and co-founded the Civil Rights Movement. He would represent pro bono Sinhalese youths who had been victims of human rights abuses. He opposed the Criminal Justice Commission as it violated the rule of law and the right to a fair trial and two parallel systems of justice. He also opposed the 1982 referendum on extending the life of Parliament by six years. He addressed the United Nations Commission on Human Rights in Geneva in 1997 and 1999 and the European Parliament in 1998 on the grievances of Sri Lanka's Tamil population. He was involved in the Krishanti Kumaraswamy case and was instrumental in bringing attention to the Chemmani mass graves. He was noted for his appearances, pro bono, on behalf of Tamil youth detained by the state under the Prevention of Terrorism Act and emergency regulations. He even took on unpopular work such as defending those accused of the Central Bank bombing.

=== Politics ===
Ponnambalam joined the All Ceylon Tamil Congress (ACTC) led by his father in the 1960s and became president of its youth wing in 1966. On 14 May 1972, the ACTC, Illankai Tamil Arasu Kachchi, Ceylon Workers' Congress, Eelath Thamilar Otrumai Munnani and All Ceylon Tamil Conference formed the Tamil United Front, later renamed the Tamil United Liberation Front (TULF). The TULF failed to select Ponnambalam as one of its candidates for the 1977 parliamentary election. As a result, Ponnambalam stood as an independent candidate in Jaffna but was defeated by TULF candidate V. Yogeswaran.

In 1978, Ponnambalam re-registered the ACTC as a separate political party. The ACTC contested elections thereafter but with little success. Ponnambalam was the ACTC's candidate at the 1982 presidential election. He came fourth after receiving 173,934 votes (2.67%), though he did win a majority of votes in the Jaffna District, the heartland of the Sri Lankan Tamil population. Ponnambalam was one of the ACTC's candidates in the Jaffna District at the 1989 parliamentary election, however the ACTC failed to win any seats in Parliament.

Initially, Ponnambalam did not support the separatist agenda espoused by Sri Lankan Tamil militant groups and worked closely with the Sinhalese politicians, co-authoring Sirimavo Bandaranaike's manifesto in 1988. But as the Sri Lankan Civil War progressed, he grew disillusioned and distrustful of Sinhalese politicians and began to adopt a more nationalistic stance. Ponnambalam contested in the 1994 parliamentary election as part of an independent group in the Colombo District, but the group failed to win any seats in Parliament. Thereafter Ponnambalam became a more radical, vociferous supporter of the militant Liberation Tigers of Tamil Eelam (LTTE) and an ardent critic of the Sri Lankan government and moderate Tamil political parties such as the TULF which he branded "quislings" and "collaborators". Ponnambalam travelled the world to promote the LTTE and its cause.

Ponnambalam was a vocal critic of President Chandrika Kumaratunga and unsuccessfully attempted to field a Tamil candidate against Kumaratunga in the 1999 presidential election. Kumaratunga was reelected, and the day after her victory, Kumaratunga gave a speech in which she warned LTTE supporters living in the south (Sinhalese-majority areas) to be aware. A few days later, Ponnambalam wrote an open letter to Kumaratunga saying that he was "an unalloyed, unrepentant supporter of the political philosophy of the LTTE", condemning "the naked threats that dot[ted] [Kumaratunga's victory] speech" and concluding that "a political solution to the Tamil Problem is in the hands of the Tamils themselves and only in their hands and that the Sinhalese and Tamils can continue to live in this island and in peace only if they live in two definite and distinct compartments each minding their own business unfettered by the other". The letter is regarded as an epitaph to Ponnambalam's commitment to the struggle for the equality and freedom of the Sri Lankan Tamils.

== Death ==
On the morning of 5 January 2000, at around 9.05 AM, a female suicide bomber blew herself up in front of the Prime Minister's Office on Sir Ernest de Silva Mawatha (Flower Road) in Colombo, killing 13 and injuring 29. Shortly afterwards there was tension in Colombo as Tamils feared reprisals. Ponnambalam had been planning to view a Mercedes-Benz car with his son but upon hearing about the suicide bombing they stayed at home. At around 10 AM, a man called "Shantha", who spoke fluent Sinhala, arrived at Ponnambalam's house, Gitanjali, on Queens Road in Colombo, and was shown inside. Ponnambalam and Shantha spoke for about thirty minutes before the pair left in one of Ponnambalam's Mercedes-Benz. Ponnambalam dispensed with his chauffeur and drove himself whilst Shantha sat in the front passenger seat. Ponnambalam told his servants that he was going out but didn't say where he was going. Ponnambalam seemed comfortable with Shantha but had removed his watch, gold chain and other jewellery before leaving.

About an hour later passers-by found Ponnambalam's car parked at Ramakrishna Terrace in Wellawatte with Ponnambalam slouched in the driver's seat. He had been shot twice, once in the head and once in the chest, at close range. The driver's window had been lowered and it is believed that it was through this that the killer(s) shot Ponnambalam. The gun used to kill Ponnambalam was believed to be a Browning 9 mm and was presumed to have had a silencer as no one in the neighbourhood heard any gunshots. There was no sign of Shantha, though according to the police another person had been sitting in the rear seats of the car. According to Ponnambalam's family, Shantha had been speaking to Ponnambalam on the phone since November 1999. Ponnambalam had told his family that he was discussing a case with Shantha.

Ponnambalam was assassinated in the same area as MP and newspaper publisher Nadarajah Atputharajah (alias Ramesh) was assassinated in November 1999. Atputharajah's assassination was blamed on the Eelam People's Democratic Party, a government-backed paramilitary group. An unknown group calling itself the National Movement Against Tigers claimed responsibility for Ponnambalam's assassination and threatened to kill others who helped the LTTE, directly or indirectly. It is widely believed that the assassination was sanctioned by Kumaratunga.

According to The Sunday Leader, Ponnambalam's killing was organised by Baddegana Sanjeewa, a member of Kumaratunga's Presidential Security Division. Acting on Sanjeewa's instructions Reserve Police Constable Sugath Ranasinghe, posing as Shantha, became friendly with Ponnambalam. On the day of the killing, Shantha lured Ponnambalam to Wellawatte where gangsters M. A. Kalinga (alias Moratu Saman) and Tharawatte Ajith (alias Sujeewa) were waiting to kill Ponnambalam. After the killing, the killers were alleged to have gone to the office of a deputy minister and shown the murder weapon, which belonged to Mahendra Ratwatte, Kumaratunga's second cousin and son of a deputy defence minister Anuruddha Ratwatte, and Ponnambalam's mobile phone as proof. According to The Sunday Leader, Kumaratunga tried to protect Ponnambalam's killers after the assassination. In December 2000, The Sunday Leader claimed that it received a sworn affidavit from CDB director SSP Bandula Wickremasinghe, addressed to Kumaratunga, indicating that Mahendra Ratwatte was involved in Ponnambalam's killing. In February 2002, The Sunday Leader published a transcript of a telephone conversation between Ranasinghe and OIC Nuwan Wedasinghe of the Criminal Detective Bureau (CDB) which further implicated Mahendra Ratwatte in Ponnambalam's killing.

Ranasinghe, Moratu Saman and Sujeewa were eventually arrested by the police after which Ranasinghe implicated in Mahendra Ratwatte in Ponnambalam's killing. According to the police, the three detainees had confessed to killing Ponnambalam and Satana editor Rohana Kumara on a contract from a private party/patriotic group. Sanjeewa was shot dead on 2 November 2001, allegedly by Dhammika Perera, a member of the Sri Lankan mafia. His body was found slumped in the driver's seat of his Nissan Serena, with six shots in Pagoda Road, Colombo. Notorious gangster Moratu Saman was shot dead on 18 May 2003 in Moratuwa by gangster Thoppi Chaminda. Ranasinghe was shot dead on 20 August 2003 in Moratuwa as he returning from Moratuwa Magistrates's court in a rickshaw.

On 8 January 2000, the LTTE posthumously conferred the title Maamanithar (great human being) to Ponnambalam. His funeral was held on 9 January 2000 at the Kannate Hindu cemetery.

Ponnambalam was one of Colombo's wealthiest residents, owning a fleet of Mercedes-Benz cars. Following his, death his sister Vijayalakshmi got into legal disputes with his widow and children over ownership of property and companies in the United States and Singapore. No one had been brought to justice for Ponnambalam's killing.

== Electoral history ==
Electoral history of Kumar Ponnambalam
Election	Constituency	Party	Votes	Result
1977 parliamentary	Jaffna	Ind	9,960	Not elected
1982 presidential	Sri Lanka	ACTC	173,934	Not elected
1989 parliamentary	Jaffna District	ACTC	2,866	Not elected
1994 parliamentary	Colombo District	Ind		Not elected
