= Vinayagamoorthy =

Vinayagamoorthy is both a surname and a given name. Notable people with the name include:

- A. Vinayagamoorthy (1933–2017), Sri Lankan lawyer and politician
- Vinayagamoorthy Muralitharan (born 1966), Sri Lankan politician and former militant
