= K. W. Devanayagam =

Sri Lankan Tamil lawyer, politician, government minister and Member of Parliament

Hon. Deshamanya K. W. Devanayagam
- க. வி. தேவநாயகம்

Minister of Justice
- In office 1977–1980
- Succeeded by: Nissanka Wijeratne

Minister of Home Affairs

Member of the Ceylonese Parliament for Kalkudah
- In office 1965–1989
- Preceded by: P. Manicavasagam

Personal details
- Born: 26 March 1910
- Died: 17 December 2002 (aged 92)
- Party: United National Party
- Education: St. Joseph's College, Colombo; Ceylon Law College
- Profession: Lawyer
- Ethnicity: Sri Lankan Tamil
- Religion: Roman Catholic

Deshamanya Kanapathipillai William "Bill" Devanayagam (26 March 1910 – 17 December 2002) was a Sri Lankan Tamil lawyer, politician, government minister and Member of Parliament.

== Early life ==
Devanayagam was born on 26 March 1910. A Roman Catholic, Devanayagam was educated at St. Joseph's College, Colombo. A keen sportsman, he captained the school's cricket team in 1930 and was the East Ceylon champion in tennis. After school, Devanayagam joined Ceylon Law College, qualifying as a proctor.

== Career ==
Devanayagam practised law in Kalkudah, Batticaloa District for many years.

Devanayagam contested as an independent candidate from Kalkudah at the 1947 parliamentary election but was defeated by V. Nalliah. He won the 1965 parliamentary election as a United National Party candidate. He was re-elected at the 1970 and 1977 parliamentary elections. He was appointed Minister of Justice in July 1977 and Minister of Home Affairs in February 1980.

== Death ==
Devanayagam died on 17 December 2002.
