= C. X. Martyn =

Sri Lankan Tamil politician and Member of Parliament

Hon. C. X. Martyn MP
- சி. சே. மார்ட்டின்

Member of the Ceylonese Parliament for Jaffna
- In office 1970–1977
- Preceded by: G. G. Ponnambalam
- Succeeded by: V. Yogeswaran

Personal details
- Born: 14 March 1908
- Ethnicity: Sri Lankan Tamil

Cyrillus Xavier Martyn (Tamil: சிரிலஸ் சேவியர் மார்ட்டின்; born 14 March 1908) was a Sri Lankan Tamil politician and Member of Parliament.

Martyn stood as the Illankai Tamil Arasu Kachchi's (Federal Party) candidate in Jaffna at the 1965 parliamentary election but was defeated by the All Ceylon Tamil Congress candidate G. G. Ponnambalam. He was ITAK's candidate in the constituency at the 1970 parliamentary election. He won the election and entered Parliament. He was expelled from ITAK in 1971 for supporting the new republican constitution.

Martyn contested the 1977 parliamentary election as an independent candidate but was defeated by the Tamil United Liberation Front candidate V. Yogeswaran. Martyn was a Roman Catholic.
