= Alfred Duraiappah =

Sri Lankan politician (1926–1975)

The Honourable Alfred Duraiappah
- அல்பிரட் துரையப்பா

Member of the Ceylonese Parliament for Jaffna
- In office 1960–1965
- Preceded by: G. G. Ponnambalam
- Succeeded by: G. G. Ponnambalam

12th Mayor of Jaffna
- In office 15 February 1970 – 27 July 1975
- Preceded by: S. Nagarajah
- Succeeded by: R. Viswanathan

Personal details
- Born: 15 June 1926
- Died: 27 July 1975 (aged 49) Jaffna, Sri Lanka
- Party: Sri Lanka Freedom Party
- Spouse: Dr Parameswary Duraiappah
- Children: Rochana (Eesha)
- Education: Ceylon Law College
- Profession: Proctor

Alfred Thangarajah Duraiappah (15 June 1926 – 27 July 1975) was a Sri Lankan lawyer who served as Mayor of Jaffna from 1970 until his assassination. He was also a Member of Parliament for Jaffna from 1960 to 1965. Duraiappah was killed by the Liberation Tigers of Tamil Eelam.

== Early life and education ==
Duraiappah was born on 15 June 1926. He was the son of an ice and aerated water manufacturer from Vannarpannai in northern Ceylon. He was educated at St. John's College, Jaffna. Following his schooling, he joined the Ceylon Law College, qualifying as a proctor and joining the Unofficial Bar of Jaffna in 1948.

== Political career ==
Duraiappah entered local government politics in 1952 having been elected to Jaffna Municipal Council and became its deputy mayor in 1958. Duraiappah stood as an independent candidate in Jaffna at the March 1960 parliamentary election. He won the election and entered Parliament, defeating G. G. Ponnambalam from the All Ceylon Tamil Congress and S. Kathiravelupillai of the Federal Party. He was re-elected at the July 1960 parliamentary election defeating G. G. Ponnambalam and S. Kathiravelupillai once again. He lost his seat in the 1965 parliamentary election, finishing third after G. G. Ponnambalam and C. X. Martyn of the Federal Party. He contested the 1970 parliamentary election, finishing second to C. X. Martyn after Ponnambalam. He was elected Mayor of Jaffna on 15 February 1970 and re-elected on 22 April 1971. By April 1971, Duraiappah had become a member of the governing Sri Lanka Freedom Party (SLFP) and its chief organiser in Jaffna District. With the support of the ruling party, Duraiappah was able to channel government money for municipal works. Tamil militants considered Duraiappah to be a traitor and government collaborator. In February 1971 Tamil militant Pon Sivakumaran tried to assassinate Duraiappah by throwing a hand grenade on to Duraiappah's car which was parked on Second Cross Road in Jaffna. Duraiappah was not inside the car at the time. Duraiappah was criticised for his handling of the 1974 Tamil conference incident in which 11 people were killed.

== Assassination ==
On 27 July 1975, Duraiappah who had returned from Brunei where his wife was the Chief Medical Officer, went to the Varadaraja Perumal Temple (Maha Vishnu Temple) in Ponnalai with his fourteen-year-old daughter Eesha for their weekly worship in the Peugeot 404 which had been given to Duraiappah by his supporters. As they arrived at the temple, Duraiappah was shot dead by masked men. D.K. Rajaratnam, who was a member of the Jaffna Municipal Council who was with Duraiappah was also shot and injured. It was reported that the three masked men who carried out the shooting got into the mayor's car and drove off. It was later found abandoned at Sendankulam by the police. The police began a major search operation to locate the killers while a special team headed Ana Seneviratne, Deputy Inspector General of Police for Range B was sent on orders from Prime Minister Sirimavo Bandaranaike. The entire Jaffna peninsula was cordoned off by the police and all vehicles searched. The inquest into the death was carried out by J.M.D. Jesurathnam Magistrate of Malakkam. As news spread of the shooting, many gathered at the Chelliah Kumarasuriar, Minister of Posts and Telecommunications visited the hospital.

Some members of his family believed that Posts and Telecommunications Minister Kumarasuriar, Duraiappah's political rival, was behind the assassination. However, his assassination was widely blamed on the rebel Liberation Tigers of Tamil Eelam (LTTE) and its leader V. Prabhakaran. On 25 April 1978 the LTTE issued an open letter, which was published in the Virakesari, claiming responsibility for the assassination of eleven people including Duraiappah.

The Duraiappah Stadium in Jaffna was named after him.

== Family ==
Duraiappah married Dr Parameswary, daughter of Cumaraswamy. They had a daughter Rochana (Eesha). Duraiappah was a Christian.

Duraiappah's nephew Nishan Duraiappah is the chief of Peel Regional Police in Ontario, Canada.

== Popular culture ==
The biographical Tamil language film Neeru Pootha Neruppu (நீறு பூத்த நெருப்பு; Fire Beneath Ash), directed by Devinda Kongahage and starring Bose Venkat as Duraiappah, was released in India in late 2025.

== See also ==
- List of people assassinated by the Liberation Tigers of Tamil Eelam
