= M. Sivasithamparam =

Sri Lankan Tamil politician

Hon. M. Sivasithamparam

Deputy Speaker, House of Representatives of Ceylon
- In office 8 March 1968 – 25 March 1970
- Preceded by: Razik Fareed
- Succeeded by: I. A. Cader

Leader, Tamil United Liberation Front
- In office 1989–2002
- Preceded by: A. Amirthalingam
- Succeeded by: V. Anandasangaree

President, Tamil United Liberation Front
- In office 1978–2002
- Succeeded by: V. Anandasangaree

Member of the Ceylonese Parliament for Udupiddy
- In office 1960–1970
- Succeeded by: K. Jeyakody, ITAK

Member of the Ceylonese Parliament for Nallur
- In office 1977–1983
- Preceded by: C. Arulampalam, ACTC

Member of Parliament for National List
- In office 2001–2002
- Succeeded by: K. Thurairetnasingam, TNA

Personal details
- Born: 20 July 1923 Karaveddy, British Ceylon
- Died: 5 June 2002 (aged 78) Colombo National Hospital, Colombo, Sri Lanka
- Party: Tamil United Liberation Front
- Other political affiliations: Tamil National Alliance
- Education: Vigneswara College; St. Joseph's College; Ceylon University College; Colombo Law College
- Profession: Lawyer
- Ethnicity: Sri Lankan Tamil

Murugesu Sivasithamparam (20 July 1923 – 5 June 2002) was a leading Sri Lankan Tamil politician, Member of Parliament and Deputy Speaker.

== Early life ==
Sivasithamparam was born 20 July 1923 in Karaveddy in northern province of Ceylon. He was educated at Vigneswara College, Karaveddy and St. Joseph's College, Colombo. He later studied at Ceylon University College and Colombo Law College. After graduation he joined the legal profession, becoming an advocate. He appeared as defence counsel in many criminal cases.

Sivasithamparam married Sarathadevi, daughter of Ponnambalam. They had a son (Sathyendra) and a daughter (Niranjali).

== Political career ==
Sivasithamparam came under the influence of communism and Marxism while studying at Ceylon University College. He was a supporter of P. Kandiah, a leading communist from Karaveddy. His support for communism gradually declined and he took up Sri Lankan Tamil nationalism instead.

Sivasithamparam stood as an independent candidate for Point Pedro at the 1956 parliamentary election but failed to get elected. He joined the All Ceylon Tamil Congress (ACTC) in 1958. A delimitation commission in the late 1950s created a new electoral district for Udupiddy from parts of Point Pedro. Sivasithamparam stood as the ACTC candidate in the new electoral district at the March 1960 parliamentary election. He won the election and entered Parliament. He was re-elected at the July 1960 and 1965 parliamentary elections.

Sivasithamparam took part in the 1961 satyagraha organised by the Illankai Tamil Arasu Kachchi (Federal Party). He served as "postman" for the Tamil Postal Service set-up as part of the civil disobedience campaign, delivering by motorcycle a letter informing the Jaffna police superintendent of the illegal postal service. He was assaulted by soldiers whilst trying to women taking part in the satyagraha and was hospitalised for days.

Sivasithamparam served as Deputy Speaker between 1968 and 1970. He stood for re-election in Udupiddy at the 1970 parliamentary election but was defeated by the ITAK candidate. In 1972 the ACTC, ITAK and others formed the Tamil United Front (later renamed Tamil United Liberation Front). Sivasithamparam was elected vice president of TUF in 1972.

Sivasithamparam was delivering leaflets along with other leading Tamil politicians (A. Amirthalingam, V. N. Navaratnam, K. P. Ratnam and K. Thurairatnam) in 1976 when they were all arrested on government orders. Sivasithamparam was released but the others were taken to Colombo and tried for sedition. All the defendants were acquitted after a famous trial at bar case in which 72 Tamil lawyers including S. J. V. Chelvanayakam and G. G. Ponnambalam acted for the defence.

Sivasithamparam was the TULF's candidate for Nallur at the 1977 parliamentary election which he won with the largest majority in the country. The TULF became the largest opposition party in Parliament and Sivasithamparam became deputy leader of the opposition. Sivasithamparam was elected president of the TULF in 1978.

During the 1983 Black July riots, Sivasithamparam's home and cars in Norris Canal Road, Colombo were burnt. Sivasithamparam was away in Mannar but his family were home. They escaped unharmed.

Sivasithamparam and all other TULF MPs boycotted Parliament from the middle of 1983 for a number of reasons: they were under pressure from Sri Lankan Tamil militants not to stay in Parliament beyond their normal six-year term; the Sixth Amendment to the Constitution of Sri Lanka required them to swear an oath unconditionally renouncing support for a separate state; and the Black July riots in which up to 3,000 Tamils were murdered by Sinhalese mobs. After three months of absence, Sivasithamparam forfeited his seat in Parliament on 22 October 1983. His refusal to take the oath under the Sixth Amendment also barred him from practising as a lawyer.

Sivasithamparam and his family, like many families of leading Tamil politicians, fled to Madras (now Chennai), Tamil Nadu in India. M. G. Ramachandran, the Chief Minister of Tamil Nadu, gave the family a flat to stay in. Whilst in India Sivasithamparam took part in numerous peace talks. After the signing of the Indo-Sri Lanka Accord in 1987 Sivasithamparam returned to Sri Lanka. He was one of the TULF's candidates in Jaffna District at the 1989 parliamentary election but failed to get elected. Sivasithamparam survived an assassination attempt on 13 July 1989 but A. Amirthalingam and V. Yogeswaran, his fellow TULF leaders, were killed in the incident. Sivasithamparam had been shot in the chest and spent a long time in hospital recovering. He took on the leadership of the TULF following the assassination of Amirthalingam.

He was one of the TULF's candidates in Vanni District at the 1994 parliamentary election but again failed to get elected. He took part in further peace talks in the late 1990s. Ill health and failure of peace talks forced him to return to Tamil Nadu.

In 2001 the TULF, ACTC, Eelam People's Revolutionary Liberation Front and Tamil Eelam Liberation Organization formed the Tamil National Alliance (TNA). Sivasithamparam, the elder statesman of Sri Lankan Tamil politics, returned to Sri Lanka in 2001 when he was appointed as a National List Member of Parliament for the TNA in December 2001.

== Death ==
Sivasithamparam died on 5 June 2002 after a brief illness. His funeral took place in Karaveddy on 9 June 2002.
