= Kalkudah Electoral District =

Electoral district of Sri Lanka

Coordinates: 8.1167°N 79.7167°E

Kalkudah Electoral District was an electoral district of Sri Lanka between August 1947 and February 1989. The district was named after the town of Kalkudah in Batticaloa District, Eastern Province. The 1978 Constitution of Sri Lanka introduced the proportional representation electoral system for electing members of Parliament. The existing 160 mainly single-member electoral districts were replaced with 22 multi-member electoral districts. Kalkudah electoral district was replaced by the Batticaloa multi-member electoral district at the 1989 general elections, the first under the PR system, though Kalkudah continues to be a polling division of the multi-member electoral district.

== Members of Parliament ==
Key

Independent ITAK UNP

Election	Member	Party	Term
1947	V. Nalliah	Independent	1947-1952
1952	V. Nalliah	United National Party	1952-1956
1956	Ahmed Hussain Macan Markar	Independent	1956-1960
1960 (March)	P. Manicavasagam	Illankai Tamil Arasu Kachchi	1960-1965
1960 (July)	P. Manicavasagam	Illankai Tamil Arasu Kachchi	1960-1965
1965	K. W. Devanayagam	United National Party	1965-1989
1970	K. W. Devanayagam	United National Party	1965-1989
1977	K. W. Devanayagam	United National Party	1965-1989

== Elections ==
=== 1947 Parliamentary General Election ===
Results of the 1st parliamentary election held between 23 August 1947 and 20 September 1947:

Candidate	Party	Symbol	Votes	%
V. Nalliah	Independent	Hand	5,559	46.01%
K. W. Devanayagam		Bird	3,176	26.29%
Meeralebbe		House	2,411	19.96%
M. A. C. M. Saleh		Key	935	7.74%
Valid Votes			12,081	100.00%
Rejected Votes			220	
Total Polled			12,301	
Registered Electors			22,030	
Turnout			55.84%	

=== 1952 Parliamentary General Election ===
Results of the 2nd parliamentary election held between 24 May 1952 and 30 May 1952:

Candidate	Party	Symbol	Votes	%
V. Nalliah	United National Party	Umbrella	7,559	52.92%
Sivagnanam Subramaniam		Elephant	6,724	47.08%
Valid Votes			14,283	100.00%
Rejected Votes			147	
Total Polled			14,430	
Registered Electors			22,285	
Turnout			64.75%	

=== 1956 Parliamentary General Election ===
Results of the 3rd parliamentary election held between 5 April 1956 and 10 April 1956:

Candidate	Party	Symbol	Votes	%
Ahmed Hussain Macan Markar	Independent	Umbrella	6,719	41.77%
V. Nalliah		Pair of Scales	4,625	28.75%
P. Manicavasagam	Illankai Tamil Arasu Kachchi	House	4,555	28.31%
S. Sivagnanam		Bicycle	188	1.17%
Valid Votes			16,087	100.00%
Rejected Votes			165	
Total Polled			16,252	
Registered Electors			26,732	
Turnout			60.80%	

=== 1960 (March) Parliamentary General Election ===
Results of the 4th parliamentary election held on 19 March 1960:

Candidate	Party	Symbol	Votes	%
P. Manicavasagam	Illankai Tamil Arasu Kachchi	House	7,318	48.51%
A. I. Macan Markar	United National Party	Elephant	5,587	37.03%
V. Nalliah		Cup	2,182	14.46%
Valid Votes			15,087	100.00%
Rejected Votes			212	
Total Polled			15,299	
Registered Electors			18,330	
Turnout			83.46%	

=== 1960 (July) Parliamentary General Election ===
Results of the 5th parliamentary election held on 20 July 1960:

Candidate	Party	Symbol	Votes	%
P. Manicavasagam	Illankai Tamil Arasu Kachchi	House	7,605	58.95%
S. Sivagnanam	Independent	Cockerel	5,295	41.05%
Valid Votes			12,900	100.00%
Rejected Votes			125	
Total Polled			13,025	
Registered Electors			18,330	
Turnout			71.06%	

=== 1965 Parliamentary General Election ===
Results of the 6th parliamentary election held on 22 March 1965:

Candidate	Party	Symbol	Votes	%
K. W. Devanayagam	United National Party	Elephant	6,566	37.93%
P. Manicavasagam	Illankai Tamil Arasu Kachchi	House	6,096	35.22%
V. Nalliah	All Ceylon Tamil Congress	Bicycle	3,354	19.38%
M. A. C. A. Rahuman	Sri Lanka Freedom Party	Hand	981	5.67%
U. Haji Bhaila		Umbrella	312	1.80%
Valid Votes			17,309	100.00%
Rejected Votes			144	
Total Polled			17,453	
Registered Electors			24,008	
Turnout			72.70%	

=== 1970 Parliamentary General Election ===
Results of the 7th parliamentary election held on 27 May 1970:

Candidate	Party	Symbol	Votes	%
K. W. Devanayagam	United National Party	Elephant	11,205	50.53%
P. Manicavasagam	Illankai Tamil Arasu Kachchi	House	8,420	37.97%
S. Sivagnanam		Pair of Scales	1,660	7.49%
S. S. Gabriel		Umbrella	557	2.51%
A. M. Abdul Caffoor	Sri Lanka Freedom Party	Hand	331	1.49%
Valid Votes			22,173	100.00%
Rejected Votes			120	
Total Polled			22,293	
Registered Electors			26,670	
Turnout			83.59%	

=== 1977 Parliamentary General Election ===
Results of the 8th parliamentary election held on 21 July 1977:

Candidate	Party	Symbol	Votes	%
K. W. Devanayagam	United National Party	Elephant	13,140	44.94%
S. Sampanthamoorthiu	Tamil United Liberation Front	Sun	12,595	43.07%
A. H. Macan Markar		Hand	3,507	11.99%
Valid Votes			29,242	100.00%
Rejected Votes			217	
Total Polled			29,459	
Registered Electors			33,995	
Turnout			86.66%	
