= Mavai Senathirajah =

Sri Lankan Tamil politician (1942–2025)

Hon. Mavai Senathirajah MP
- மாவை சேனாதிராஜா මාවෙයි සේනාධිරාජා
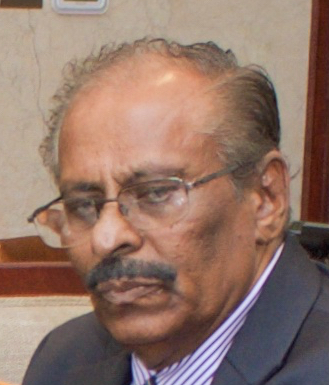
- Senathirajah in 2015

Member of Parliament for Jaffna District
- In office 10 October 2000 – 3 March 2020

Member of Parliament for National List
- In office 1999–2000
- Preceded by: Neelan Tiruchelvam
- In office 1989–1994
- Preceded by: A. Amirthalingam

Personal details
- Born: 27 October 1942 Maviddapuram, British Ceylon
- Died: 29 January 2025 (aged 82)
- Party: Illankai Tamil Arasu Kachchi
- Other political affiliations: Tamil National Alliance
- Education: University of Ceylon, Peradeniya
- Ethnicity: Sri Lankan Tamil
- Religion: Hindu

Somasundaram Senathirajah (Tamil: சோமசுந்தரம் சேனாதிராஜா; Sinhala: මාවෙයි සේනාධිරාජා; 27 October 1942 – 29 January 2025), commonly known as Mavai Senathirajah, was a Sri Lankan politician who was a Member of Parliament. He was the leader of the Illankai Tamil Arasu Kachchi (ITAK) from 2014 to 2024, the main constituent party of the Tamil National Alliance (TNA). He spent much of his political career advocating for Tamil nationalism.

== Early life ==
Senathirajah was born in Maviddapuram, Jaffna on 27 October 1942. He was educated at Veemangamam School and Nadeswara College. After school he joined the University of Ceylon, Peradeniya as an external student and graduated with a bachelor's degree.

Senathirajah got involved in the Sri Lankan Tamil nationalism movement at a young age and took part in the 1961 satyagraha. He joined the youth wing of Illankai Tamil Arasu Kachchi (ITAK), the Tamil Youth League, in 1962. He was secretary of the Eela Thamil Elanger Eyakam (Eelam Tamil Youth Movement) from 1966 to 1969. He was arrested on several occasions between 1969 and 1983 and spent seven years imprisoned at eight different prisons. He became secretary of the Tamil Youth Front, the youth wing the Tamil United Liberation Front (TULF), in 1972.

== Career ==
Senathirajah was one of the ENDLF/EPRLF/TELO/TULF alliance's candidates in Jaffna District at the 1989 parliamentary election but failed to get elected after coming 13th amongst the alliance candidates. However, he entered Parliament in 1989 when he was appointed a National List Member of Parliament for the TULF, replacing A. Amirthalingam who had been assassinated on 13 July 1989. He re-entered Parliament in 1999 as a National List Member of Parliament for the TULF following the assassination of Neelan Tiruchelvam on 29 July 1999.

Senathirajah was one of the TULF's candidates in Jaffna District at the 2000 parliamentary election. He was elected and re-entered Parliament after gaining 10,965 votes. On 20 October 2001, the All Ceylon Tamil Congress, Eelam People's Revolutionary Liberation Front, Tamil Eelam Liberation Organization and TULF formed the Tamil National Alliance (TNA). Senathirajah contested the 2001 parliamentary election as one of the TNA's candidates in Jaffna District. He was elected and re-entered Parliament after gaining a tally of 33,831 votes. He was re-elected at the 2004, 2010 and 2015 parliamentary elections. He garnered a tally of 38,783 votes in 2004 general election. However, he had a slightly underwhelming numbers during the 2010 election with a count of 20,501 votes. He was subsequently successful in the 2015 parliamentary election after securing 58,782 votes. He contested the 2020 Sri Lankan parliamentary election, but he failed to secure a parliamentary seat despite accumulating 20,358 votes.

In 2013, Senathirajah caused a stir when he requested TNA party members to nominate him as the chief ministerial candidate ahead of the Northern Provincial Council Elections. India strongly opposed the planned attempt to nominate Mavai Senathirajah as the chief ministerial candidate by TNA party for the 2013 Northern Provincial Council Elections considering his past history of having formed deep rooted friendship with members of the LTTE. Senathirajah's decision to step into the candidacy baffled Sampanthan as he initially planned to nominate C. V. Vigneswaran for the chief minister position for the 2013 Northern Provincial Council Elections.

Senathirajah was general-secretary of ITAK before being elected leader of ITAK on 6 September 2014. Senathirajah marched on his way to dethrone the longstanding leader R. Sampanthan, as the latter held onto the party leadership position of ITAK from 2004 to 2014 for nearly a decade. During those years when Sampanthan held onto the leadership position of ITAK, Senathirajah continued to serve in as the general secretary of the party. Soon after he was elected as the party leader of ITAK, he assured and guaranteed that he would be an hardliner by formulating a 15-point plan of action to take the party forward for a foreseeable future.

Senathirajah was one of a trio of MPs (the other two being R. Sampanthan and M. A. Sumanthiran) who led the TNA. On 7 October 2024, Senathirajah voluntarily stepped down as the party leader of ITAK, amidst to rifts amongst party members during the lead-up to the 2024 Sri Lankan parliamentary election.

== Death ==
Senathirajah was hospitalized and was admitted to the Emergency Treatment Unit (ETU) of the Jaffna Teaching Hospital after an accident at his residence. On 29 January 2025, he died after a brief illness caused by the accident. He died at the age of 82.

== Electoral history ==
Electoral history of Mavai Senathirajah
Election	Constituency	Party	Votes	Result
1989 parliamentary	Jaffna District	TULF	2,820	Not elected
2000 parliamentary	Jaffna District	TULF	10,965	Elected
2001 parliamentary	Jaffna District	TNA	33,831	Elected
2004 parliamentary	Jaffna District	TNA	38,783	Elected
2010 parliamentary	Jaffna District	TNA	20,501	Elected
2015 parliamentary	Jaffna District	TNA	58,782	Elected
