= A. Vinayagamoorthy =

Sri Lankan politician (1933–2017)

Hon. A. Vinayagamoorthy MP
- அ. விநாயகமூர்த்தி

Member of Parliament for Jaffna District
- In office 8 April 2010 – 26 June 2015
- In office 10 October 2000 – 7 February 2004

Personal details
- Born: 19 December 1933
- Died: 28 May 2017 (aged 83)
- Party: Tamil National Alliance
- Profession: Lawyer
- Ethnicity: Sri Lankan Tamil

Appathurai Vinayagamoorthy (Tamil: அப்பாத்துரை விநாயகமூர்த்தி; 19 December 1933 – 28 May 2017) was a Sri Lankan Tamil lawyer, politician and Member of Parliament. He was leader and president of the All Ceylon Tamil Congress.

== Early life ==
Vinayagamoorthy was born on 19 December 1933.

== Political career ==
Vinayagamoorthy was a long-standing member of the All Ceylon Tamil Congress (ACTC). He was one of the ACTC's candidates in Jaffna District at the 1989 parliamentary election but the ACTC failed to win any seats in Parliament. He took on the leadership of the party following the assassination of Kumar Ponnambalam in January 2000. He was the ACTC candidate for Jaffna District at the 2000 parliamentary election. He was elected and entered Parliament. He relinquished leadership of the ACTC to Ponnambalam's son Gajendrakumar Ponnambalam when he entered politics in 2001.

On 20 October 2001 the ACTC, Eelam People's Revolutionary Liberation Front, Tamil Eelam Liberation Organization and Tamil United Liberation Front formed the Tamil National Alliance (TNA). Vinayagamoorthy contested the 2001 parliamentary election as one of the TNA's candidates in Jaffna District. He was elected and re-entered Parliament. He was one of the TNA's candidates in Vanni District at the 2004 parliamentary election but failed to get elected after coming sixth amongst the TNA candidates.

Gajendrakumar Ponnambalam left the TNA in 2010, taking the ACTC with him but Vinayagamoorthy stayed with the TNA. He was one of the TNA's candidates in Jaffna District at the 2010 parliamentary election. He was elected and re-entered Parliament. He was not chosen to contest the 2015 parliamentary election.

== Electoral history ==
Electoral history of A. Vinayagamoorthy
Election	Constituency	Party	Votes	Result
1989 parliamentary	Jaffna District	ACTC	986	Not elected
2000 parliamentary	Jaffna District	ACTC	3,825	Elected
2001 parliamentary	Jaffna District	TNA	19,472	Elected
2004 parliamentary	Vanni District	TNA	13,586	Not elected
2010 parliamentary	Jaffna District	TNA	15,311	Elected
