= P. Manicavasagam =

Ceylon Tamil politician and Member of Parliament

Hon. P. Manicavasagam MP

Member of the Ceylonese Parliament for Kalkudah
- In office 1960–1965
- Preceded by: A. H. Macan Markar
- Succeeded by: K. W. Devanayagam

Personal details
- Born: 11 December 1912
- Party: Illankai Tamil Arasu Kachchi
- Ethnicity: Ceylon Tamil

Ponniah Manicavasagam was a Ceylon Tamil politician and Member of Parliament.

Manicavasagam was born on 11 December 1912.

Manicavasagam stood as the Illankai Tamil Arasu Kachchi's (Federal Party) candidate for Kalkudah at the 1956 parliamentary election but was defeated by A. H. Macan Markar. He stood again at the March 1960 parliamentary election. This time he won the election and entered Parliament. He was re-elected at the July 1960 parliamentary election. He stood for re-election at the 1965 parliamentary election but was defeated by the United National Party candidate K. W. Devanayagam. He was defeated by Devanayagam at the 1970 parliamentary election as well.
