= V. Nalliah =

Ceylon Tamil teacher, politician, Member of Parliament and government minister

Hon. V. Nalliah MSC MP

Minister of Post and Information
- In office 19 June 1952 – 12 July 1952

Member of the State Council of Ceylon for Trincomalee-Batticaloa
- In office 1943 – 20 September 1947
- Preceded by: E. R. Tambimuttu

Member of the Ceylonese Parliament for Kalkudah
- In office 20 September 1947 – 10 April 1956
- Succeeded by: Ahmed Hussain Macan Markar

Personal details
- Born: 9 October 1909
- Party: Independent; United National Party; All Ceylon Tamil Congress
- Profession: Teacher
- Ethnicity: Ceylon Tamil

Vallipuram Nalliah was a Ceylon Tamil teacher, politician, Member of Parliament and government minister.

== Early life and family ==
Nalliah's birth date is the subject of some dispute, with some sources citing 9 October 1909, and others 1 July 1909. He trained to be a teacher, and married Thangaratnam, daughter of Muttiah.

== Career ==
Nalliah was principal of the Men's Training School in Attalichenai. He was a member of Batticaloa Urban Council.

Nalliah contested the 1943 by-election as a candidate in Trincomalee-Batticaloa and was elected to the State Council.

Nalliah contested the 1947 parliamentary election as an independent candidate in Kalkudah. He won the election and entered Parliament. He joined the United National Party-led government and was made Parliamentary Secretary to the Minister of Health and Local Government. He was re-elected at the 1952 parliamentary election as a UNP candidate. He was briefly Minister of Post and Information in the new government.

Nalliah stood for re-election as an independent candidate at the 1956 parliamentary election but was defeated by A. H. Macan Markar. He was also unsuccessful at the March 1960 parliamentary election. He was the All Ceylon Tamil Congress' candidate in Kalkudah at the 1965 parliamentary election but was again defeated.
