= Nishan Duraiappah =

Chief of Police for Peel Regional Police Service

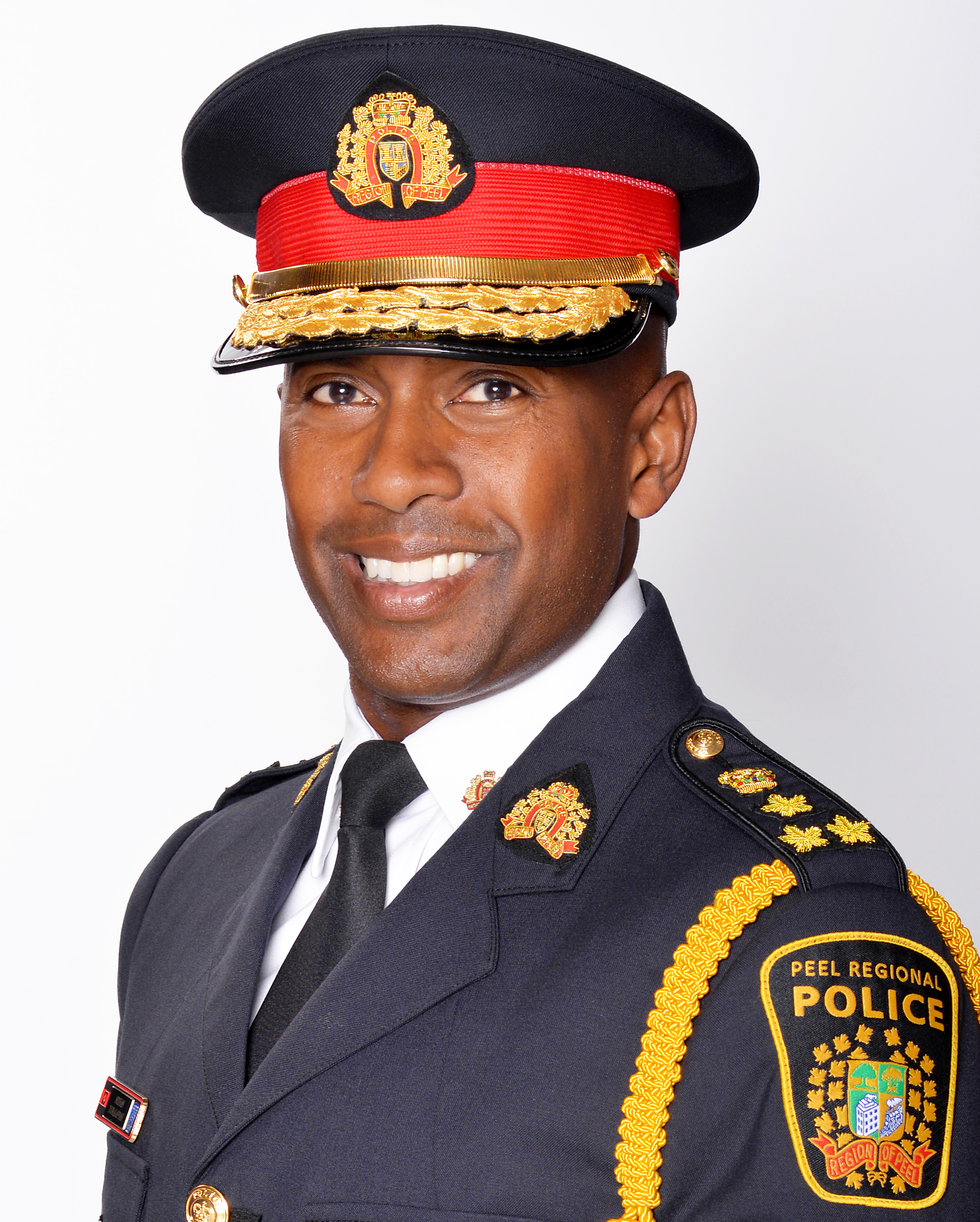
- Born: September 4, 1973 (age 53); Sri Lanka
- Education: University of Toronto, University of Western Ontario
- Occupations: Chief of Police, Peel Regional Police
- Relatives: Alfred Thangarajah Duraiappah

Nishan Duraiappah OOnt (born September 4, 1973) is a Canadian police officer who is the current Chief of Police with the Peel Regional Police, which serves the cities of Brampton and Mississauga with over 1.6 million residents. He was sworn in as Chief of Peel Regional Police in October 2019.

== Personal life and education ==
Duraiappah was born in Sri Lanka and immigrated to Canada. He holds a Bachelor of Arts Degree in Sociology and Criminology from the University of Toronto, and a Diploma of Public Administration from the University of Western Ontario. Duraiappah is the nephew of lawyer and politician Alfred Thangarajah Duraiappah, a former Sri Lankan Mayor of Jaffna and Member of Parliament, who was assassinated by the Tamil Tigers in 1975.

== Career ==
Chief Duraiappah began his policing career with Halton Regional Police in December 1995, where he served as Constable for several years in uniform patrol in the towns and cities of Milton, Halton Hills and Burlington. Throughout his career with Halton Regional Police, he worked in several roles, including the Regional Drug and Mortality Bureau, Guns and Gangs Unit, District Criminal Investigations and with the RCMP Combined Forces Special Enforcement Unit. In the fall of 2015, Duraiappah was promoted to Deputy Chief of Halton Regional Police, in charge of leading district operations of four municipalities, the Regional Community Mobilization Bureau and the Information Technology and Strategic Management Office.

=== Chief of Police ===
In 2019, Duraiappah was sworn in as Chief of Police with Peel Regional Police. During the first year of his command, he created the first community-embedded Intimate and Partner Violence unit to respond to the growing needs in Peel Region. Additionally, he adopted the Community Safety and Well-Being (CSWB) framework that led to the establishment of Peel Regional Police's CSWB Bureau.

Through Duraiappah's leadership in 2021, a Divisional Mobilization unit was launched to support a wide range of priority populations. A collaborative undertaking with the Ontario Human Rights Commission (OHRC) to examine and address discriminatory practices within the service was also initiated.

== Accomplishments ==
=== Community Safety and Well-Being Strategy ===
Under Chief Duraiappah, Peel Regional Police became the first police service in Canada to implement its own Community Safety and Well-Being (CSWB) Strategy to modernize traditional community policing. The strategy is guided by the Ontario CSWB framework and is a ‘lens’ that shapes how Peel Regional Police delivers services by focusing on four key areas: Incident Response, Risk Intervention, Prevention and Social Development.

Within the CSWB strategy, Duraiappah launched a number of Canadian and Ontario policing first non-traditional and non-police response teams

- Mobile Community Crisis Rapid Response Team: Police and crisis personnel attend high-risk mental health calls together to provide immediate support.
- Community Crisis Rapid Response Team: crisis personnel from partner agencies attend low-risk mental health calls and provide on-site support.
- Embedded Community Crisis Rapid Response Team: crisis personnel resolve low-risk mental health calls and assist individuals by phone.
- Safe Centre Response Team: Police and a mobile support worker attend intimate partner incidents to provide early intervention and support to assist families.
- The creation of its first-ever community-embedded Intimate and Partner Violence Unit to respond to the growing needs in our Region.

=== Human Rights Project ===
In October 2020, Chief Duraiappah and Peel Regional Police committed to a human rights organizational change project with the Ontario Human Rights Commission (OHRC) by signing a Memorandum of Understanding. The Human Rights Project is a collaborative undertaking by Peel Regional Police with the Ontario Human Rights Commission (OHRC) and the Peel Police Service Board to examine discriminatory practices within the service.

=== Road map ===
Chief Duraiappah developed a road map for Innovation and Technology, as well as a Digital Officer Transformation plan to better equip officers to serve the community. This included the fastest body worn camera. deployment in Canadian policing history.

== Honours and associations ==
From June 2022 to June 2023, Duraiappah served as President of the Ontario Association of Chiefs of Police. He is the recipient of the Queen Elizabeth II Diamond Jubilee Medal and is an Officer of the Order of Merit of the Police Forces. In November 2022, Chief Duraiappah was appointed to the Order of Ontario. He is also an active member of the Major City Chiefs Association (MCCA).

Duraiappah is involved in the community as Board of Directors for Runnymede Healthcare Centre and SAAAC Autism Centre.

Although he never served in the Canadian Forces, he is currently an honorary Senate member for the Lorne Scots Primary Reserve unit.
