= Chelliah Kumarasuriar =

Sri Lankan politician

Chelliah Kumarasuriar was a Sri Lankan politician. He served as the Minister of Posts and Telecommunications (1970-1977) and a Member of Senate of Ceylon. He was a political rival of Alfred Duraiappah and was initially suspected of behind his death. However, the assassination was widely blamed on the rebel Liberation Tigers of Tamil Eelam (LTTE) and its leader V. Prabhakaran. On 25 April 1978 the LTTE issued an open letter, which was published in the Virakesari, claiming responsibility for the assassination of eleven people including Duraiappah.
