= Jaffna Electoral District (1947–1989) =

Electoral district of Sri Lanka

Jaffna Electoral District was an electoral district of Sri Lanka between August 1947 and February 1989. The district was named after the city of Jaffna in Jaffna District, Northern Province. The 1978 Constitution of Sri Lanka introduced the proportional representation electoral system for electing members of Parliament. The existing 160 mainly single-member electoral districts were replaced with 22 multi-member electoral districts. Jaffna electoral district was replaced by the Jaffna multi-member electoral district at the 1989 general elections, the first under the PR system, though Jaffna continues to be a polling division of the multi-member electoral district.

== Members of Parliament ==
Key

Independent ACTC ITAK TULF

Election	Member	Party	Term
1947	G. G. Ponnambalam	All Ceylon Tamil Congress	1947-1960
1952	G. G. Ponnambalam	All Ceylon Tamil Congress	1947-1960
1956	G. G. Ponnambalam	All Ceylon Tamil Congress	1947-1960
1960 (March)	Alfred Duraiappah	Independent	1960-1965
1960 (July)	Alfred Duraiappah	Independent	1960-1965
1965	G. G. Ponnambalam	All Ceylon Tamil Congress	1965-1970
1970	C. X. Martyn	Illankai Tamil Arasu Kachchi	1970-1977
1977	V. Yogeswaran	Tamil United Liberation Front	1977-1989

== Elections ==
=== 1947 Parliamentary General Election ===
Results of the 1st parliamentary election held between 23 August 1947 and 20 September 1947:

Candidate	Party	Symbol	Votes	%
G. G. Ponnambalam	All Ceylon Tamil Congress	Bicycle	14,324	73.28%
Arunachalam Mahadeva	United National Party	Elephant	5,224	26.72%
Valid Votes			19,548	100.00%
Rejected Votes			133	
Total Polled			19,681	
Registered Electors			42,546	
Turnout			46.26%	

=== 1952 Parliamentary General Election ===
Results of the 2nd parliamentary election held between 24 May 1952 and 30 May 1952:

Candidate	Party	Symbol	Votes	%
G. G. Ponnambalam	All Ceylon Tamil Congress	Umbrella	12,726	60.48%
E. M. V. Naganathan	Illankai Tamil Arasu Kachchi	Hand	8,317	39.52%
Valid Votes			21,043	100.00%
Rejected Votes			88	
Total Polled			21,131	
Registered Electors			29,489	
Turnout			71.66%	

=== 1956 Parliamentary General Election ===
Results of the 3rd parliamentary election held between 5 April 1956 and 10 April 1956:

Candidate	Party	Symbol	Votes	%
G. G. Ponnambalam	All Ceylon Tamil Congress	Bicycle	8,914	40.46%
E. M. V. Naganathan	Illankai Tamil Arasu Kachchi	House	7,173	32.56%
M. Karthigasan	Communist Party	Star	3,239	14.70%
Arulambalam Visuvanathan	Lanka Sama Samaja Party	Key	2,703	12.27%
Valid Votes			22,029	100.00%
Rejected Votes			149	
Total Polled			22,178	
Registered Electors			34,804	
Turnout			63.72%	

=== 1960 (March) Parliamentary General Election ===
Results of the 4th parliamentary election held on 19 March 1960:

Candidate	Party	Symbol	Votes	%
Alfred Duraiappah	Independent	Sun	6,201	35.68%
G. G. Ponnambalam	All Ceylon Tamil Congress	Bicycle	5,312	30.56%
S. Kathiravelupillai	Illankai Tamil Arasu Kachchi	House	5,101	29.35%
Arulambalam Visuvanathan	Lanka Sama Samaja Party	Key	767	4.41%
Valid Votes			17,381	100.00%
Rejected Votes			92	
Total Polled			17,473	
Registered Electors			24,299	
Turnout			71.91%	

=== 1960 (July) Parliamentary General Election ===
Results of the 5th parliamentary election held on 20 July 1960:

Candidate	Party	Symbol	Votes	%
Alfred Duraiappah	Independent	Bicycle	6,313	35.13%
G. G. Ponnambalam	All Ceylon Tamil Congress	Eye	6,015	33.47%
S. Kathiravelupillai	Illankai Tamil Arasu Kachchi	House	5,644	31.40%
Valid Votes			17,972	100.00%
Rejected Votes			84	
Total Polled			18,056	
Registered Electors			25,299	
Turnout			74.31%	

=== 1965 Parliamentary General Election ===
Results of the 6th parliamentary election held on 22 March 1965:

Candidate	Party	Symbol	Votes	%
G. G. Ponnambalam	All Ceylon Tamil Congress	Bicycle	9,350	42.37%
C. X. Martyn	Illankai Tamil Arasu Kachchi	House	6,800	30.81%
Alfred Duraiappah		Pair of Scales	5,918	26.82%
Valid Votes			22,068	100.00%
Rejected Votes			73	
Total Polled			22,141	
Registered Electors			28,473	
Turnout			77.76%	

=== 1970 Parliamentary General Election ===
Results of the 7th parliamentary election held on 27 May 1970:

Candidate	Party	Symbol	Votes	%
C. X. Martyn	Illankai Tamil Arasu Kachchi	House	8,848	35.59%
Alfred Duraiappah	Independent	Umbrella	8,792	35.36%
G. G. Ponnambalam	All Ceylon Tamil Congress	Bicycle	7,222	29.05%
Valid Votes			24,862	100.00%
Rejected Votes			76	
Total Polled			24,938	
Registered Electors			31,214	
Turnout			79.89%	

=== 1977 Parliamentary General Election ===
Results of the 8th parliamentary election held on 21 July 1977:

Candidate	Party	Symbol	Votes	%
V. Yogeswaran	Tamil United Liberation Front	Sun	16,251	51.26%
Kumar Ponnambalam	Independent	Tree	6,960	24.25%
A. L. Abraham		Pair of Scales	4,349	15.15%
C. X. Martyn		Umbrella	900	3.14%
A. G. Rajasooriar		Chair	164	0..57%
A. Tharmalingham	Independent	Ship	77	0.27%
Valid Votes			28,701	100.00%
Rejected Votes			78	
Total Polled			28,779	
Registered Electors			34,865	
Turnout			82.54%	

V. Yogeswaran and all other TULF MPs boycotted Parliament from the middle of 1983 for a number of reasons: they were under pressure from Sri Lankan Tamil militants not to stay in Parliament beyond their normal six-year term; the Sixth Amendment to the Constitution of Sri Lanka required them to swear an oath unconditionally renouncing support for a separate state; and the Black July riots in which up to 3,000 Tamils were murdered by Sinhalese mobs. After three months of absence, Yogeswaran forfeited his seat in Parliament on 22 October 1983.
