= Tamil United Liberation Front =

Political party in Sri Lanka

Tamil United Liberation Front தமிழர் ஐக்கிய விடுதலை முன்னணி ද්‍රවිඩ එක්සත් විමුක්ති පෙරමුණ
- Leader: V. Anandasangaree
- Secretary: K. K. Kanagarajah
- Founder: S. J. V. Chelvanayakam; G. G. Ponnambalam; Savumiamoorthy Thondaman
- Founded: 4 May 1972 (53 years ago)
- Merger of: All Ceylon Tamil Congress; Illankai Tamil Arasu Kachchi; Ceylon Workers' Congress
- Preceded by: Tamil United Front
- Headquarters: 5/3A Wijayaba Mawatha, Kalubowila, Dehiwala
- Ideology: Tamil nationalism

Election symbol
- Rising Sun

Website
- tulf.org

The Tamil United Liberation Front (TULF; Tamil: தமிழர் ஐக்கிய விடுதலை முன்னணி, romanized: Tamil Onrupattatu Viduthulai Munnai, Sinhala: ද්‍රවිඩ එක්සත් විමුක්ති පෙරමුණ, romanized: Dravida Eksath Vimukthi Peramuna) is a political party in Sri Lanka.

== Formation ==
On 4 May 1972, several Tamil political groups, including the Federal Party (ITAK), Ceylon Workers Congress (CWC), and All Ceylon Tamil Congress formed the Tamil United Front (TUF) under the joint leadership of S.J.V. Selvanayagam, S. Thondaman, and G.G. Ponnambalam. The TUF changed its name to Tamil United Liberation Front (TULF) and adopted the demand for an independent state to be known as the "secular, socialist state of Tamil Eelam". The CWC declined to support the newly formed TULF.

== 1977 Parliamentary General Election ==
In the first general election contested by the TULF, the 1977 Sri Lankan parliamentary election, in which the UNP won by a landslide, the TULF won 6.40% of the popular vote and 18 out of 168 seats in the Sri Lankan parliament, including all 14 seats in the Northern Province.

Votes and seats won by the TULF by electoral district

Electoral District	Votes	%	Seats	Turnout	TULF MP
Batticaloa	26,648	24.70%	1	71.15%	Chelliah Rajadurai
Chavakachcheri	20,028	63.27%	1	85.65%	V. N. Navaratnam
Jaffna	16,251	56.62%	1	82.32%	V. Yogeswaran
Kalkudah	12,595	43.07%	0	86.02%	
Kalmunai	7,093	27.38%	0	89.86%	
Kankesanthurai	31,155	85.41%	1	83.08%	A. Amirthalingam
Kayts	17,640	64.05%	1	75.72%	K. P. Ratnam
Kilinochchi	15,607	73.42%	1	79.71%	V. Anandasangaree
Kopay	25,840	77.20%	1	80.03%	S. Kathiravelupillai
Manipay	27,550	83.99%	1	79.28%	V. Dharmalingam
Mannar	15,141	51.58%	1	92.40%	P. S. Soosaithasan
Mullaitivu	10,261	52.36%	1	79.34%	X. M. Sellathambu
Mutur	7,520	27.00%	0	91.65%	
Nallur	29,858	89.42%	1	83.05%	M. Sivasithamparam
Paddirippu	15,877	49.17%	1	89.92%	P. Ganeshalingam
Point Pedro	12,989	55.91%	1	81.66%	K. Thurairatnam
Pottuvil	23,990	26.97%	1	179.02%	M. Kanagaratnam
Puttalam	3,268	10.52%	0	83.58%	
Sammanthurai	8,615	34.65%	0	91.04%	
Trincomalee	15,144	51.76%	1	81.78%	R. Sampanthan
Udupiddy	18,768	63.44%	1	80.05%	T. Rasalingam
Vaddukoddai	23,384	70.18%	1	81.90%	T. Thirunavukarasu
Vavuniya	13,821	59.02%	1	82.31%	T. Sivasithamparam
Total	399,043	6.40%	18		

The TULF became the official opposition as a result of the rout of the SLFP. The TULF's success would lead to riots in which hundreds of Tamils were murdered by Sinhalese mobs.

Throughout the 1970s and early 1980s, the TULF was frequently blamed by nationalist Sinhalese politicians for acts of violence committed by militant groups such as the Liberation Tigers of Tamil Eelam (LTTE). In fact, the TULF represented an older, more moderate generation of Tamils that felt independence could be achieved without violence, unlike the LTTE, who believed in armed conflict.

In October 1983, all the TULF legislators, numbering sixteen at the time, forfeited their seats in Parliament for refusing to swear an oath unconditionally renouncing support for a separate state in accordance with the Sixth Amendment to the Constitution of Sri Lanka.

During the 1980s, the LTTE began to see the TULF as a rival in its desire to be considered the sole representative of the Tamils of the north and east. Over the next two decades, the LTTE assassinated several TULF leaders, including A. Amirthalingam and Neelan Thiruchelvam.

== 1989 Parliamentary General Election ==
The TULF formed an alliance with the three Indian-backed paramilitary groups, Eelam National Democratic Liberation Front (ENDLF), Eelam People's Revolutionary Liberation Front (EPRLF), and Tamil Eelam Liberation Organization (TELO), to contest the 1989 Sri Lankan parliamentary election. The alliance won 3.40% of the popular vote and 10 out of 225 seats in the Sri Lankan parliament.

Votes and seats won by the TULF / ENDLF / EPRLF / TULF alliance by electoral district

Electoral District	Votes	%	Seats	Turnout	TULF / ENDLF / EPRLF / TELO MPs
Ampara	43,424	20.32%	1	80.41%	Jeyaratnam Thiviya Nadan (EPRLF)
Batticaloa	55,131	35.49%	3	71.74%	Prince Gunarasa Casinader (EPRLF); G. Karunakaran (TELO); Thambimuthu Samuel Pennington Thevarasa (EPRLF), murdered 11 May 1990; Joseph Pararajasingham (TULF), from 1990 (replaces Sam Thambimuthu (EPRLF))
Jaffna	60,013	25.02%	3	40.50%	Kandiah Navaratnam (EPRLF); Suresh Premachandran (EPRLF); Ganeshankari Yogasangari (EPRLF), murdered 19 June 1990
Vanni	17,271	39.99%	2	30.53%	Raja Kuhaneswaran (TELO); Anthony Emmanuel Silva (EPRLF)
National List			1		A. Amirthalingam (TULF), murdered 13 July 1989; Mavai Senathirajah (replaces A. Amirthalingam)
Total	188,593	3.40%	10	63.6%	

== 1994 Parliamentary General Election ==
In the 1994 Sri Lankan parliamentary election, in which the People's Alliance, led by Chandrika Kumaratunga, came to power after seventeen years of UNP rule, the TULF won 1.60% of the popular vote and 5 out of 225 seats in the Sri Lankan parliament.

Votes and seats won by the TULF by electoral district

Electoral District	Votes	%	Seats	Turnout	TULF MPs
Batticaloa	76,516	43.95%	3	66.47%	Joseph Pararajasingham; P. Selvarasa; K. Thurairajasingam
Trincomalee	28,380	23.66%	1	65.15%	A. Thangathurai
National List			1		Dr. Neelan Tiruchelvam, murdered 29 July 1999; Mavai Senathirajah, from August 1999 (replaces Dr. Neelan Tiruchelvam)
Total	132,461	1.60%	5	76.23%	

== 2000 Parliamentary General Election ==
In the 2000 Sri Lankan parliamentary election, in which the People's Alliance, led by Ratnasiri Wickremanayake, retained power, the TULF won 1.23% of the popular vote and 5 out of 225 seats in the Sri Lankan parliament.

Votes and seats won by the TULF by electoral district

Electoral District	Votes	%	Seats	Turnout	TULF MPs
Batticaloa	54,448	29.20%	2	71.74%	Joseph Pararajasingham; Nimalan Soundaranayagam
Jaffna	32,852	27.59%	3	21.32%	V. Anandasangaree; Mavai Senathirajah; S. Sivamaharajah
Trincomalee	14,090	10.58%	0	68.52%	
Vanni	4,643	5.58%	0	42.13%	
National List			0		
Total	106,033	1.23%	5	75.62%	

== 2001 Parliamentary General Election ==
In the first parliamentary election contested by the Tamil National Alliance, the 5 December 2001 election, the TNA led by Rajavarothiam Sampanthan won 3.88% of the popular vote and 15 out of 225 seats in the Sri Lankan parliament.

Votes and seats won by TNA by electoral district

Electoral District	Votes	%	Seats	Turnout	TNA MPs
Ampara	48,789	17.41%	1	82.51%	A. Chandranehru (TULF)
Batticaloa	86,284	48.17%	3	68.20%	G. Krishnapillai (ACTC); Joseph Pararajasingham (TULF); Thambiraja Thangavadivel (TELO)
Colombo	12,696	1.20%	0	76.31%	
Jaffna	102,324	54.84%	6	31.14%	V. Anandasangaree (TULF); Gajendrakumar Ponnambalam (ACTC); Nadarajah Raviraj (TULF); Mavai Senathirajah (TULF); M. K. Shivajilingam (TELO); A. Vinayagamoorthy (ACTC)
Trincomalee	56,121	34.83%	1	79.88%	R. Sampanthan (TULF)
Vanni	41,950	44.39%	3	46.77%	Selvam Adaikalanathan (TELO); Sivasakthy Ananthan (EPRLF); Irasa Kuhaneswaran (TELO)
National List			1		M. Sivasithamparam (TULF), died 5 June 2002; K. Thurairetnasingam (TULF) (replaces M. Sivasithamparam)
Total	348,164	3.88%	15	76.03%	
Source:"Parliamentary General Election 2001, Final District Results". Department of Elections, Sri Lanka.

== Split ==
TULF President V. Anandasangaree, a critic of the Tamil Tigers, left the Tamil National Alliance when it took a pro-Tamil Tigers stance in the 2004 general election. Anandasangaree gained control of the TULF after a legal battle, forcing the TULF members who wanted to remain in the TNA to resurrect the Illankai Tamil Arasu Kachchi, which is now a constituent party of the TNA.

== 2004 Parliamentary General Election ==
The legal battle over the control of the TULF meant that the party, led by V. Anandasangaree, contested as an independent group and only in one electoral district in the 2004 Sri Lankan parliamentary election, winning 0.06% of the popular vote and no seats in the Sri Lankan parliament.

Votes and seats won by the TULF by electoral district

Electoral District	Votes	%	Seats	Turnout	TULF MPs
Jaffna	5,156	1.82%	0	47.38%	
Total	5,156	0.06%	0	75.96%	
Source:"Parliamentary General Election 2004, Final District Results". Department of Elections, Sri Lanka. Archived from the original on 7 January 2009.

== 2010 Parliamentary General Election ==
In the 2010 Sri Lankan parliamentary election, in which the United People's Freedom Alliance, led by Mahinda Rajapaksa, retained power, the TULF led, by V. Anandasangaree, won 0.11% of the popular vote and no seats in the Sri Lankan parliament.

Votes and seats won by the TULF by electoral district

Electoral District	Votes	%	Seats	Turnout	TULF MPs
Batticaloa	4,424	2.45%	0	58.56%	
Colombo	834	0.09%	0	65.03%	
Jaffna	2,892	1.95%	0	23.33%	
Vanni	1,073	1.00%	0	43.89%	
Total	9,223	0.11%	0	61.26%	
Source:"Parliamentary General Election – 2010". Department of Elections, Sri Lanka. Archived from the original on 14 April 2010.
