= G. G. Ponnambalam =

Sri Lankan Tamil politician (1901–1977)

Hon. G. G. Ponnambalam MP MSC KC
- ஜி. ஜி. பொன்னம்பலம்

Minister of Industries, Industrial Research and Fisheries (Note: Minister of Industries and Fisheries from June 1952 to October 1953.)
- In office 3 September 1948 – 22 October 1953
- Preceded by: C. Sittampalam
- Succeeded by: Kanthiah Vaithianathan

Member of the State Council of Ceylon for Point Pedro
- In office 1934–1947

Member of the Ceylonese Parliament for Jaffna
- In office 1947–1960
- Succeeded by: Alfred Duraiappah
- In office 1965–1970
- Preceded by: Alfred Duraiappah
- Succeeded by: C. X. Martyn

Personal details
- Born: 8 November 1901 Alvai, British Ceylon
- Died: 9 February 1977 (aged 75) Malaysia
- Party: All Ceylon Tamil Congress
- Education: Fitzwilliam College, Cambridge
- Profession: Lawyer
- Ethnicity: Ceylon Tamil

Ganapathipillai Gangaser Ponnambalam (Tamil: கணபதி காங்கேசர் பொன்னம்பலம்; 8 November 1901 – 9 February 1977) was a Ceylon Tamil lawyer, politician and cabinet minister. He was the founder and leader of the All Ceylon Tamil Congress (ACTC), the first political party to represent the Ceylon Tamils.

== Early life and family ==
Ponnambalam was born on 8 November 1901. (Note: Another source gives Ponnambalam's date of birth as 8 November 1902.) He was the son of Gangaser, a postmaster from Alvaly in northern Ceylon. He was educated at St. Patrick's College, Jaffna and St. Joseph's College, Colombo. Ponnambalam joined Fitzwilliam College, Cambridge on a government scholarship, graduating with a first class degree in natural sciences tripos. He also received LL.B. and MA degrees from Cambridge.

Ponnambalam married Rose Alagumani Clough. He is the father of Kumar Ponnambalam and daughter Vijayalakshmi.

== Career ==
=== Law ===
Ponnambalam was called to the bar at Lincoln's Inn. He returned to Ceylon, via France, in 1927 and started practising law as an advocate. An outstanding debater, Ponnambalam became one of the leading criminal lawyers in the country and was made a King's Counsel in 1948. Ponnambalam appeared in several high-profile legal cases during his career. He was one of the defence lawyers in the 1954 Ranjani taxi cab case at which his cross examination of fingerprint experts resulted in the acquittal of all four accused and changes to the finger print law. As his popularity began to decline in the late 1950s Ponnambalam gradually moved his legal practice to Malaya, only returning to Ceylon to contest elections and take part in high-profile cases.

In January 1976 the Union Government of India dismissed the state government of Tamil Nadu, accusing Chief Minister Karunanidhi of corruption, and imposed President's rule. Ponnambalam represented Karunanidhi at Supreme Court justice Ranjit Singh Sarkaria's commission of inquiry. Karunanidhi was cleared of the corruption charges. On 21 May 1976 several leading Tamil politicians (A. Amirthalingam, V. N. Navaratnam, K. P. Ratnam, M. Sivasithamparam and K. Thurairatnam) were delivering leaflets when they were all arrested on government orders. Sivasithamparam was released but the others were taken to Colombo and tried for sedition. All the defendants were acquitted on 10 February 1977 after a famous trial at bar case in which around 70 leading Tamil lawyers, including Ponnambalam and S. J. V. Chelvanayakam, acted for the defence.

=== Politics ===
Ponnambalam became the political leader of the Ceylon Tamils following the deaths of P. Arunachalam (1924) and his brother P. Ramanathan (1930). He contested the 1931 state council election as a candidate in Mannar-Mullaitivu but failed to get elected to the State Council. He had been unable to contest in his home constituency of Point Pedro due to the boycott organised by the Jaffna Youth Congress. The boycott ended in 1934 and Ponnambalam contested the ensuing by-elections in Point Pedro. He won the election and entered the State Council. He was re-elected at the 1936 Ceylonese State Council election.

The Board of Ministers established after the 1936 state council election consisted entirely of Sinhalese members, excluding minorities who together made up 35% of Ceylon's population. This was one of the drivers which led Ponnambalam to make his infamous 50:50 demand in a marathon speech to the State Council on 15 March 1939. He repeated the demand when he gave evidence to the Soulbury Commission in February 1945. Ponnambalam wanted 50% of seats in Parliament for the Sinhalese, and 50% for all other ethnic groups.

In August 1944 Ponnambalam formed the All Ceylon Tamil Congress (ACTC), the first political party to represent the Ceylon Tamils, from various Tamil groups. He was elected president of the party. Ponnambalam stood as the ACTC candidate for Jaffna at the 1947 parliamentary election. He won the election and entered Parliament. The ACTC swept the poll in the Tamil dominated Northern Province, winning seven of the nine seats in the province. The United National Party (UNP) became the largest party Parliament but it did not have a majority. Ponnambalam presided over a meeting at the house of Herbert Sri Nissanka (the Yamuna Conference) at which an unsuccessful attempt was made to form a government without the UNP. The UNP subsequently formed a government with the support of independent and appointed MPs.

Following independence in February 1948, Ceylon's Sinhalese dominated government set about disenfranchising the 780,000 (12% of the population) Indian Tamils living in Ceylon by introducing the Ceylon Citizenship Bill. Ponnambalam and the ACTC opposed the bill. The bill prompted Ponnambalam to describe Prime Minister D. S. Senanayake as a "racist". The bill was passed by Parliament at its second reading on 20 August 1948, a day Ponnambalam described as a black one for Ceylon. Shortly afterwards Ponnambalam decided to join the UNP led government. He was made Minister of Industries, Industrial Research and Fisheries on 3 September 1948. Kankesanthurai Cement Factory, Paranthan Caustic Soda Chemical Factory and Valaichchenai Paper Mill were opened during Ponnambalam's ministerial tenure.

Ponnambalam's decision to join the UNP led government in 1948 caused a split in the ACTC. Eventually, in December 1949, the ACTC dissidents, led by Chelvanayakam, C. Vanniasingam and E. M. V. Naganathan, formed the Illankai Tamil Arasu Kachchi (ITAK, Federal Party). As Ceylon's two main parties, the UNP and Sri Lanka Freedom Party (SLFP), introduced policies, such as the Sinhala Only Act, which further discriminated against the country's minorities, ITAK's Tamil nationalism became more popular than the ACTC's conservatism. At the 1956 parliamentary election the ITAK overtook the ACTC as the most popular party amongst Ceylon Tamils.

Ponnambalam was re-elected at the 1952 parliamentary election. His cabinet portfolio was changed to Minister of Industries and Fisheries in June 1952. On 22 October 1953 — shortly after Sir John Kotelawala replaced Dudley Senanayake as Prime Minister — G. G. Ponnambalam left his post as Minister of Industries and Fisheries amid a cabinet reshuffle widely reported at the time and attributed to political realignment because Ponnambalam had supported Dudley.

Ponnambalam was re-elected at the 1956 parliamentary election but lost his seat at the March 1960 parliamentary election. He tried unsuccessfully to re-gain his seat at the July 1960 parliamentary election. He was elected at the 1965 parliamentary election. After the election the ACTC joined the UNP led national government and Ponnambalam was offered a ministerial position which he declined. Between 1967 and 1969 Ponnambalam led Ceylon's delegation to UN General Assembly. Ponnambalam lost his seat again at the 1970 parliamentary election.

Ponnambalam died on 9 February 1977. (Note: Another source gives Ponnambalam's date of death as 9 December 1977.) Sri Lanka Post issued a commemorative postage stamp on 22 May 1986.

== Electoral history ==
Electoral history of G. G. Ponnambalam
| Election | Constituency | Party | Votes | Result |
|---|---|---|---|---|
| 1931 state council | Mannar-Mullaitivu | | 4,667 | Not elected |
| 1934 state council by | Point Pedro | | 9,319 | Elected |
| 1936 state council | Point Pedro | | 14,029 | Elected |
| 1947 parliamentary | Jaffna | ACTC | 14,324 | Elected |
| 1952 parliamentary | Jaffna | ACTC | 12,726 | Elected |
| 1956 parliamentary | Jaffna | ACTC | 8,914 | Elected |
| 1960 March parliamentary | Jaffna | ACTC | 5,312 | Not elected |
| 1960 July parliamentary | Jaffna | ACTC | 6,015 | Not elected |
| 1965 parliamentary | Jaffna | ACTC | 9,350 | Elected |
| 1970 parliamentary | Jaffna | ACTC | 7,222 | Not elected |
