= Sinhala Maha Sabha =

Sinhalese Great Assembly සිංහල මහා සභා
- Sinhala name: සිංහල මහා සභා
- Tamil name: சிங்கள மகா சபை
- Founder: S. W. R. D. Bandaranaike
- Founded: 1936
- Dissolved: 1946/1951
- Split from: United National Party (in 1951)
- Merged into: United National Party (in 1946)
- Succeeded by: Sri Lanka Freedom Party
- Ideology: Sinhalese Buddhist nationalism

The Sinhala Maha Sabha (Sinhala: සිංහල මහා සභා, lit. 'Sinhalese Great Assembly') was a political party in colonial-era Ceylon founded by S. W. R. D. Bandaranaike in the mid-1930s to promote Sinhalese Buddhist culture and community interests. In 1946, it joined the United National Party, before leaving the coalition in 1951 to form the Sri Lanka Freedom Party.
