= Sri Lankan Tamil nationalism =

Ideology of Sri Lankan Tamil people

Sri Lankan Tamil nationalism is the conviction of the Sri Lankan Tamil people, a minority ethnic group in the South Asian island country of Sri Lanka (formerly known as Ceylon), that they have the right to constitute an independent or autonomous political community. This idea has not always existed. Sri Lankan Tamil national awareness began during the era of British rule during the nineteenth century, as Tamil Hindu revivalists tried to counter Protestant missionary activity. The revivalists, led by Arumuga Navalar, used literacy as a tool to spread Hinduism and its principles.

The reformed legislative council, introduced in 1921 by the British, was based on principles of communal representation, which led the Tamils to realize that they were the minority ethnic group and that they should be represented by a member of their own community. It was under this communal representation that Tamil national awareness changed to national consciousness—a less passive state. They formed a Tamil political party called the All Ceylon Tamil Congress (ACTC). In the years leading to Sri Lankan independence, political tension began to develop between the majority Sinhalese and minority Tamil communities as the ACTC, citing the possibility of the majority Sinhalese adopting a dominant posture, pushed for "fifty-fifty" representation in parliament. This policy would allot half the seats in parliament to the Sinhalese majority and half to the minority communities: Ceylon Tamils, Indian Tamils, Muslims and others.

After Sri Lanka achieved independence in 1948, the ACTC decided to merge with the ruling United National Party (UNP). This move was not supported by half of the ACTC members and resulted in a split—one half of the party decided to merge with the UNP and the other half decided to leave the party altogether, forming a new Tamil party in 1949, the Federal party. Policies adopted by successive Sinhalese governments, and the 1956 success of the Sinhalese Nationalist government under Solomon Bandaranaike, made the Federal Party the main voice of Tamil politics. Increased racial and political tension between the two communities led to the merger of all Tamil political parties into the Tamil United Liberation Front. This was followed by the emergence of a militant, armed form of Tamil nationalism.

== Before independence ==
=== Early beginning ===
Percentage of Sri Lankan Tamils per district based on 2001 or 1981 (italicised) census

The arrival of Protestant missionaries on a large scale to Sri Lanka (then called Ceylon), beginning in 1814, was a primary contributor to the development of political awareness among Tamils. The activities of missionaries from the American Board of Commissioners for Foreign Missions, Methodists and Anglican churches led to a revival among Tamils of the Hindu faith. Arumuga Navalar led a Hindu religious revivalist and reformist movement as a defensive response to the threat to their native culture posed by the British colonial and missionary activities. He translated literary works to encourage the use of the Tamil Language and spread Hindu Saiva principles. Navalar's efforts to revive Hinduism, the predominant religion of the Sri Lankan Tamil people, influenced Tamils who built their own schools, temples, and societies, and who published literature to counter that of the missionaries. Thus, by 1925 nearly 50 schools, including the Batticotta Seminary, were fully functioning. This revival movement also set the stage for modern Tamil prose.

The success of this effort led the Tamils to think confidently of themselves as a community and prepared the way for their awareness of a common cultural, religious and linguistic kinship in the mid-nineteenth century. For these contributions to the Tamil people, Arumugam Navalar has been described as a leader who gave his community a distinct identity.

=== Communal Consciousness ===
Great Britain controlled the whole island by 1815, and unified the country administratively in 1833 with a legislative council that acted as advisor to the Governor. The council was composed of three Europeans and one representative each of the Sinhalese, the Sri Lankan Tamils, and the Burghers. But this situation changed in 1919 with the arrival of British Governor William Manning, who actively encouraged the idea of "communal representation". He created the reformed legislative council in 1921 and its first election returned thirteen Sinhalese and three Tamils, a significant loss in representation for the Tamils when compared to the previous council based on direct appointment by the governor. Because of this, the Tamils began to develop a communal consciousness and to think of themselves as a minority community. They focused on communal representation in the council rather than national representation, and decided that their delegates should be leaders from their own community. This new sense of community identity changed the direction of Tamil nationalism. Starting in the mid-1920s, their developing national awareness transformed into a more active national consciousness, with a heightened determination to protect the interests of the Ceylon Tamil community. Influenced heavily by political history and, perhaps more importantly, Colombo-centered developments of the British administration, this emerging Tamil national consciousness led to the establishment of the All Ceylon Tamil Congress headed by Tamil politician, G. G. Ponnambalam.

=== Development ===
Historic changes occurred in 1931: the reformed legislative council was eliminated, and the Donoughmore Commission, which rejected communal representation, was formed. Instead, the Commission introduced universal franchise, in which representation was proportionate to percentage of population. The Tamil leadership strongly opposed this plan, realizing that they would be reduced to a minority in parliament. Many Sinhalese were also against the idea of universal franchise for all castes. G.G. Ponnambalam publicly protested the Donooughmore Commission and proposed to the Soulbury Commission, which had replaced the Donooughmore Commission, that roughly equal numbers of congressional seats be assigned to Tamils and to Sinhalese in the new independent Ceylon being planned, but his proposal was rejected. From the introduction of the advisory council, through the Donoughmore Commission in 1931, to the Soulbury Commission in 1947, the primary dispute between the elite of the Sinhalese and Tamils was over the question of representation, not the structure of the government. This issue of power-sharing was used by the nationalists of both communities to create an escalating inter-ethnic rivalry which has been gaining momentum ever since.

Ponnambalam's advocacy of Tamil nationalism was paralleled by a similar Sinhalese nationalism of Sinhala Maha Sabha, led by future Prime Minister Solomon Bandaranaike. This created tension between the two leaders and caused the exchange of verbal attacks, with Ponnambalam calling himself a "proud Dravidian". This interethnic and political stress led to the first Sinhalese-Tamil riot in 1939.(see Riots and pogroms in Sri Lanka)

== After independence ==
=== All Ceylon Tamil Congress ===
All Ceylon Tamil Congress's flag

The All Ceylon Tamil Congress (ACTC), founded by G. G. Ponnambalam in 1944, was popular among Tamils because it promoted the preservation of Tamil identity. The ACTC advocated a "fifty-fifty" policy, in which fifty percent of the seats in parliament would be reserved for Tamils and other minorities, the remaining fifty percent going to the Sinhalese. Which means 50% of the opportunities [education (university seats), employment, etc.) should be allocated to minorities. According to the ACTC this was a necessary defensive measure to prevent unwarranted dominance by the Sinhalese. In 1947, Ponnambalam warned the Soulbury Commission about this potential problem, and presented the ACTC's solution, which he called a "balanced representation". This fifty-fifty policy was opposed by a Muslim minority and sections of the Tamil community. D. S. Senanayake, the leader of the Sinhalese political groups, allowed Ponnambalam full control over presentations before the Soulbury Commission, prevented Sinhalese nationalists such as Solomon Bandaranaike from taking the stage, and avoided the eruption of acrimonious arguments. But the Soulbury commission rejected the charges of discrimination against the Tamils, and also rejected the fifty-fifty formula as subverting democracy.

Later the ACTC decided to adopt a new policy: "responsive cooperation" with "progressive-minded Sinhalese". Yet in 1948, Ponnampalam decided to merge the ACTC with the ruling United National Party (UNP), although he had stated earlier that the UNP was not progressive-minded. The merge was not supported by the entire party, and it ended up splitting the ACTC in half, with one faction merging with D.S. Senanayake's UNP and the other, led by S.J.V. Chelvanayakam, deciding to leave the party altogether and advocated for equal rights, 100% opportunities for Tamils without any racial barrier. In 1948, Ponnampalam voted in favour of one of several bills, later known as the Ceylon Citizenship Act which disenfranchised Indian Tamils ("Hill Country Tamils"). Although he did not vote for the other bills in the Ceylon Citizenship Act, because of his silence in parliament the Tamil public believed that he was not committed to Indian Tamil rights. The ACTC remained the major Tamil political party until 1956, when the Federal Party took over that position. The Tamil Congress still held parliamentary positions, however, and continued to be a force in Tamil politics. In 1976, the ACTC merged with other Tamil political factions to form a new party called the Tamil United Liberation Front (TULF). According to A.J. Wilson, it was the legacy of Ponnampalam that the consciousness of the Tamil people was raised, and they were inspired to see themselves as a separate Tamil national identity rather as merged in an all-island polity.

=== Federal Party ===
In 1949, a new Tamil party, called the Federal Party ("Ilankai Thamil Arasu Kadchi"), was organized by the people who broke away from the ACTC. Led by Chelvanayakam, it gained popularity among the Tamil people because it advocated Tamil rights. Its popularity was also due to the party's opposition to the Ceylon Citizenship Act and the Sinhala Only Act. As a result, the Federal party became the dominant party in the Tamil districts after the 1956 elections. Despite this, the Federal Party never asked for a separate Tamil state or even for self-determination. Instead they lobbied for a unified state which gave Tamil and Sinhalese equal status as the official language and provided for considerable autonomy in the Tamil areas. It was against this backdrop that the Bandaranaike-Chelvanayakam Pact was signed in July 1957, but pressure from the opposition and extremist groups forced Bandaranaike to abolish the pact. After the assassination of Bandaranaike, another pact was signed in 1965 between Chelvanayakam and Dudley Senenayake called the Dudley-Chelvanayakam Pact, but this agreement, like the Bandaranaike-Chelvanayakam pact, was never implemented. The UNP was defeated in the 1970 election and replaced by the United Front (UF), led by Sirimavo Bandaranaike, the widow of Solomon Bandaranaike.

The new government adopted two new policies that discriminated against the Tamil people. First, the government introduced a double standard for admission grades to universities, requiring the Tamil students to achieve higher grades than the Sinhalese students. Secondly, the same kind of policy was adopted for jobs as public servants, which were held by less than ten percent of the Tamil-speaking population. The Federal Party opposed these policies, and as a result Chelvanayakam resigned his parliamentary seat in October 1972. Shortly after, in 1973, the Federal Party decided to demand a separate, autonomous Tamil state. Until 1973, Chelvanayakam and the Federal Party had always campaigned for a unified country and thought that any partitioning would be "suicidal". The new policies, however, were considered to be discriminatory by the Tamil leadership, and this modified the official position on Tamil Nationalism. To further the new political agenda, in 1975 the Federal Party merged with the other Tamil political parties to become the Tamil United Liberation Front (TULF). In 1976, after the first national convention of TULF, the Ceylon Tamils moved toward a revised nationalism and were now unwilling to live within a confined, single-island entity.

=== Tamil United Liberation Front ===
The Tamil United Liberation Front (TULF) was formed when the Tamil political parties merged and adopted the Vaddukoddai Resolution, named after the village, Vaddukoddai, where it was developed. In the 1977 election, TULF became the first Tamil Nationalist party to run on a separatist platform. It gained a majority of the votes in the north and east, won 18 seats, and became the largest opposition party in parliament. The Vaddukoddai Resolution had a profound effect on Tamil politics—the parliamentary system was soon to be replaced by guns. TULF tried to refashion itself as the political division, negotiating an agreement with the executive president of Sri Lanka at that time, J.R. Jayewardene. This agreement, known as the District Development Councils’ Scheme, was passed in 1980, but TULF rejected it because J.R. Jayewardene had not agreed to let TULF have the five District Ministerships in the five Tamil districts where TULF received the most votes. The Sixth Amendment was passed in 1983, requiring Tamils in parliament and other public offices to take an oath of allegiance to the unified state of Sri Lanka. It forbade the advocating of a separate state, and consequently TULF members were expelled from parliament for refusing to take the oath.

=== Militant groups ===
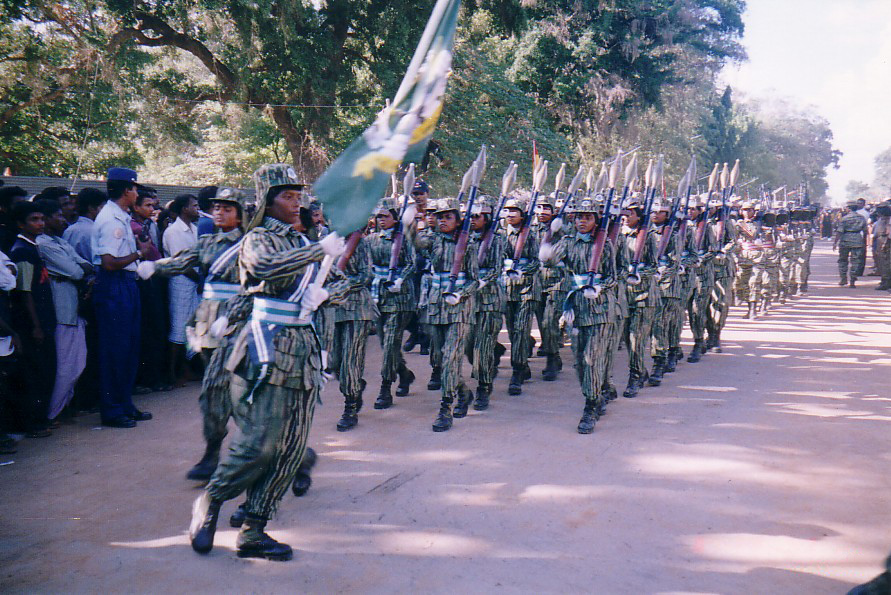
Tamil women rebels in formation in Killinochchi, 2004

After the expulsion of TULF from parliament, militants ruled the Tamil political movement. As a result, the 1970s saw the emergence of more than 30 Tamil militant groups. Anton Balasingham, the theoretician of the Liberation Tigers of Tamil Eelam (LTTE), states that the causes of the militarization of the Tamil youth were unemployment, lack of opportunities for higher education, and the imposition of an alien language. He further alleges that the majority Sinhalese government was responsible for these problems, adding that the only alternative left for Tamil youths was a "revolutionary armed struggle for the independence of their nation". Only five of the militant groups—People's Liberation Organisation of Tamil Eelam (PLOTE), Tamil Eelam Liberation Organization (TELO), Eelam People's Revolutionary Liberation Front (EPRLF), Eelam Revolutionary Organisation of Students (EROS) and LTTE—remained a potent political force; the rest were flawed ideologically and therefore not strictly Tamil Nationalist factions.

Of these five dominant groups, the LTTE was the most solidly nationalistic Tamil resistance organization. Furthermore, because of its policies, constructive Tamil Nationalist platform, and desire for national self-determination, the LTTE was supported by major sections of the Tamil community. It had established a de facto state in the areas under its control, called Tamil Eelam, and had managed a government in these areas, providing state functions such as courts, a police force, a human rights organization, and a humanitarian assistance board. a health board, and an education board. In addition, it ran a bank (Bank of Tamil Eelam), a radio station (Voice of Tigers) and a television station (National Television of Tamil Eelam).
