= All Ceylon Tamil Congress =

All Ceylon Tamil Congress Akila Ilankai Thamil Congress அகில இலங்கைத் தமிழ்க் காங்கிரஸ் අකිල ඉලංකෙයි තමිල් කොංග්‍රස්
- Secretary: Gajendrakumar Ponnambalam
- Founder: G. G. Ponnambalam
- Founded: 29 August 1944 (81 years ago)
- Headquarters: 15 Queen's Road, Colpetty, Colombo 3
- Ideology: Tamil nationalism
- National affiliation: Tamil National People's Front
- Parliament: 1 / 225
- Local Government: 101 / 7,842

Election symbol
- Bicycle

Party flag

All Ceylon Tamil Congress (Tamil: அகில இலங்கைத் தமிழ்க் காங்கிரஸ்) is the oldest Tamil political party in Sri Lanka.

== History ==
The ACTC was founded in 1944 by G. G. Ponnambalam. Ponnambalam asked for a 50-50 representation in parliament (50% for the majority Sinhalese, and 50% for all other ethnic groups). This was immediately rejected by the British Governor General Lord Soulbury as a "mockery of democracy".

Due to the cooperation of the ACTC with the United National Party (UNP), a group led by S. J. V. Chelvanayakam split from the ACTC in 1949, forming the Ilankai Tamil Arasu Kachchi (ITAK), commonly known as Federal Party. The ACTC was largely discredited when the UNP began to move away from bilingual and bicommunal policies and more towards Sinhalese Buddhist nationalism. As a result, the ITAK overtook the ACTC as the main Tamil party in the country in 1956.

In 1972 the ACTC and ITAK formed the Tamil United Front, which later evolved into the Tamil United Liberation Front in 1976. The TULF would win 18 out of the 168 seats in the National State Assembly in the 1977 general elections, thus making it the main opposition party.

Ahead of the 2001 general elections, the ACTC joined the LTTE-backed Tamil National Alliance (TNA). In the 2004 elections, the TNA won 6.9% of the popular vote and 22 out of the 225 seats in parliament.

The ACTC left the TNA in 2010 and subsequently formed a new political alliance, the Tamil National People's Front.

== Leaders ==
Leaders of the All Ceylon Tamil Congress:

- G. G. Ponnambalam (Sr.)
- Kumar Ponnambalam
- Dr. Nalliah Kumaraguruparan
- A. Vinayagamoorthy
- Gajendrakumar Ponnambalam

== 1947 Parliamentary General Election ==
In the 1947 election, the first for the independent Ceylon, the ACTC won 4.37% of the popular vote and 7 out of 95 seats in the Sri Lankan parliament.

Votes and seats won by ACTC by electoral district

Electoral District	Votes	%	Seats	Turnout	ACTC MP
Chavakachcheri	11,813	85.51%	1	49.34%	V. Kumarasamy
Jaffna	14,324	73.28%	1	46.26%	G. G. Ponnambalam
Kankesanthurai	12,126	55.39%	1	57.69%	S. J. V. Chelvanayakam
Kayts	5,230	29.21%	0	55.69%	
Kopay	9,619	58.90%	1	50.33%	C. Vanniasingam
Point Pedro	10,396	43.51%	1	58.39%	T. Ramalingam
Trincomalee	5,252	56.15%	1	56.10%	S. Sivapalan
Vaddukoddai	11,721	61.24%	1	52.00%	K. Kanagaratnam
Vavuniya	2,018	33.39%	0	55.64%	
Total	82,499	4.37%	7		

== 1952 Parliamentary General Election ==
In the 1952 election the ACTC won 2.77% of the popular vote and 4 out of 95 seats in the Sri Lankan parliament.

Votes and seats won by ACTC by electoral district

Electoral District	Votes	%	Seats	Turnout	ACTC MP
Chavakachcheri	14,801	72.33%	1	67.22%	V. Kumarasamy
Jaffna	12,726	60.48%	1	71.66%	G. G. Ponnambalam
Kayts	9,517	43.44%	1	73.36%	Alfred Thambiayah
Kopay	9,200	43.88%	0	64.57%	
Point Pedro	11,609	41.54%	1	65.80%	T. Ramalingam
Vaddukoddai	5,261	22.64%	0	69.54%	
Vavuniya	1,398	15.52%	0	69.59%	
Total	64,512	2.77%	4		

== 1956 Parliamentary General Election ==
In the 1956 election the ACTC fielded only one candidate, party leader G.G. Ponnambalam in Jaffna, who managed to win the seat with 8,914 votes.

== 1960 (March) Parliamentary General Election ==
In the March 1960 election the ACTC won 1.32% of the popular vote and 1 out of 151 seats in the Sri Lankan parliament.

Votes and seats won by ACTC by electoral district

Electoral District	Votes	%	Seats	Turnout	ACTC MP
Chavakachcheri	6,930	32.52%	0	83.20%	
Jaffna	5,312	30.56%	0	71.91%	
Kankesanthurai	1,448	7.23%	0	71.22%	
Kopay	4,936	23.35%	0	77.13%	
Nallur	6,808	34.82%	0	73.12%	
Point Pedro	2,521	17.91%	0	73.33%	
Udupiddy	7,365	34.70%	1	74.84%	M. Sivasithamparam
Vaddukoddai	2,955	13.72%	0	75.37%	
Total	38,275	1.32%	1		

== 1960 (July) Parliamentary General Election ==
In the July 1960 election the ACTC won 1.66% of the popular vote and 1 out of 151 seats in the Sri Lankan parliament.

== 1965 Parliamentary General Election ==
In the 1965 election the ACTC won 2.44% of the popular vote and 3 out of 151 seats in the Sri Lankan parliament.

Votes and seats won by ACTC by electoral district

Electoral District	Votes	%	Seats	Turnout	ACTC MP
Batticaloa	8,107	12.14%	0	150.59%	
Chavakachcheri	7,191	30.59%	0	77.92%	
Jaffna	9,350	42.37%	1	77.76%	G. G. Ponnambalam
Kalkudah	3,354	19.38%	0	72.70%	
Kankesanthurai	6,611	26.13%	0	72.42%	
Kayts	5,816	30.02%	0	61.49%	
Kilinochchi	4,076	30.76%	0	71.33%	
Kopay	8,230	34.34%	0	72.90%	
Mutur	327	0.58%	0	150.92%	
Nallur	9,860	43.12%	0	72.03%	
Point Pedro	6,614	40.43%	0	71.62%	
Udupiddy	12,009	46.67%	1	75.47%	M. Sivasithamparam
Uduvil	5,577	23.29%	0	72.80%	
Vaddukoddai	4,359	17.09%	0	69.83%	
Vavuniya	7,265	40.33%	1	73.45%	T. Sivasithamparam
Total	98,746	2.44%	3		

== 1970 Parliamentary General Election ==
In the 1970 election the ACTC won 2.32% of the popular vote and 3 out of 151 seats in the Sri Lankan parliament.

Votes and seats won by ACTC by electoral district

Electoral District	Votes	%	Seats	Turnout	ACTC MP
Chavakachcheri	12,921	45.51%	0	86.11%	
Jaffna	7,222	29.05%	0	79.89%	
Kankesanthurai	3,051	10.00%	0	81.03%	
Kayts	1,667	6.80%	0	76.88%	
Kilinochchi	9,049	50.19%	1	76.03%	V. Anandasangaree
Kopay	11,288	38.38%	0	79.01%	
Nallur	13,116	46.78%	1	78.69%	C. Arulampalam
Point Pedro	8,902	46.85%	0	79.52%	
Udupiddy	11,662	42.02%	0	80.41%	
Uduvil	11,656	40.68%	0	78.43%	
Vaddukoddai	14,359	51.29%	1	78.67%	Dr. A. Thiagarajah
Vavuniya	10,674	41.92%	0	80.82%	
Total	115,567	2.32%	3		

== 2000 Parliamentary General Election ==
In the 2000 election the ACTC won 0.32% of the popular vote and 1 out of 225 seats in the Sri Lankan parliament.

Votes and seats won by ACTC by electoral district

Electoral District	Votes	%	Seats	Turnout	ACTC MP
Batticaloa	6,968	3.74%	0	71.74%	
Colombo	5,238	0.52%	0	76.05%	
Jaffna	10,648	8.94%	1	21.33%	A. Vinayagamoorthy
Trincomalee	3,748	2.82%	0	68.53%	
Vanni	721	0.87%	0	42.14%	
Total	27,323	0.32%	1		

== 2001 Parliamentary General Election ==
In the first parliamentary election contested by the Tamil National Alliance, the 5 December 2001 election, the TNA led by Rajavarothiam Sampanthan won 3.88% of the popular vote and 15 out of 225 seats in the Sri Lankan parliament.

Votes and seats won by TNA by electoral district

Electoral District	Votes	%	Seats	Turnout	TNA MPs
Ampara	48,789	17.41%	1	82.51%	A. Chandranehru (TULF)
Batticaloa	86,284	48.17%	3	68.20%	G. Krishnapillai (ACTC); Joseph Pararajasingham (TULF); Thambiraja Thangavadivel (TELO)
Colombo	12,696	1.20%	0	76.31%	
Jaffna	102,324	54.84%	6	31.14%	V. Anandasangaree (TULF); Gajendrakumar Ponnambalam (ACTC); Nadarajah Raviraj (TULF); Mavai Senathirajah (TULF); M. K. Shivajilingam (TELO); A. Vinayagamoorthy (ACTC)
Trincomalee	56,121	34.83%	1	79.88%	R. Sampanthan (TULF)
Vanni	41,950	44.39%	3	46.77%	Selvam Adaikalanathan (TELO); Sivasakthy Ananthan (EPRLF); Irasa Kuhaneswaran (TELO)
National List			1		M. Sivasithamparam (TULF), died 5 June 2002; K. Thurairetnasingam (TULF) (replaces M. Sivasithamparam)
Total	348,164	3.88%	15	76.03%	
Source:"Parliamentary General Election 2001, Final District Results". Department of Elections, Sri Lanka.

== 2004 Parliamentary General Election ==
In the 2 April 2004 parliamentary election in which the United People's Freedom Alliance led by President Kumaratunga came to power, the Tamil National Alliance led by Rajavarothiam Sampanthan won 6.84% of the popular vote and 22 out of 225 seats in the Sri Lankan parliament.

Votes and seats won by TNA by electoral district

Electoral District	Votes	%	Seats	Turnout	TNA MPs
Ampara	55,533	19.13%	1	81.42%	K. Pathmanathan, died 21 May 2009; Thomas Thangathurai William, from 12 June 2009 (replaces K. Pathmanathan)
Batticaloa	161,011	66.71%	4	83.58%	Senathirajah Jeyanandamoorthy; Thanmanpillai Kanagasabai; Thangeswary Kathiraman; Kingsley Rasanayagam, resigned April 2004; P. Ariyanethiran, from 18 May 2004 (replaces Kingsley Rasanayagam)
Jaffna	257,320	90.60%	8	47.38%	Selvarajah Kajendren; Gajendrakumar Ponnambalam (ACTC); Suresh Premachandran (EPRLF); Nadarajah Raviraj (ITAK), murdered 10 November 2006; Mavai Senathirajah (ITAK); M. K. Shivajilingam (TELO); K. Sivanesan, murdered 6 March 2008; Pathmini Sithamparanathan; Nallathamby Srikantha (TELO), from 30 November 2006 (replaces Nadarajah Raviraj); Solomon Cyril, from 9 April 2008 (replaces Kidnan Sivanesan)
Trincomalee	68,955	37.72%	2	85.44%	R. Sampanthan (ITAK); K. Thurairetnasingam (ITAK)
Vanni	90,835	64.71%	5	66.64%	Selvam Adaikalanathan (TELO); Sivasakthy Ananthan (EPRLF); Sathasivam Kanagaratnam; Sivanathan Kisshor; Vino Noharathalingam (TELO)
National List			2		M. K. Eelaventhan, expelled from Parliament 14 December 2007 for non-attendance Joseph Pararajasingham (ITAK), murdered 24 December 2005; Chandra Nehru Chandrakanthan, from 27 September 2006 (replaces Joseph Pararajasingham); Raseen Mohammed Imam, from 5 February 2008 (replaces M. K. Eelaventhan)
Total	633,654	6.84%	22	75.96%	
Source:"Parliamentary General Election 2004, Final District Results". Department of Elections, Sri Lanka.

== 2010 Parliamentary General Election ==
In the 8 April 2010 parliamentary election in which the United People's Freedom Alliance led by President Rajapaksa retained power, the Tamil National People's Front led by Gajendrakumar Ponnambalam won 0.09% of the popular vote and no seats in the Sri Lankan parliament.

Votes and seats won by TNPF by electoral district

Electoral District	Votes	%	Seats	Turnout	TNPF MPs
Jaffna	6,362	4.28%	0	23.33%	
Trincomalee	1,182	0.85%	0	62.20%	
Total	7,544	0.09%	0	61.26%	
Source:"Parliamentary General Election – 2010". Department of Elections, Sri Lanka.
