= Kopay =

Kopay கோப்பாய் කෝපායි
- Town
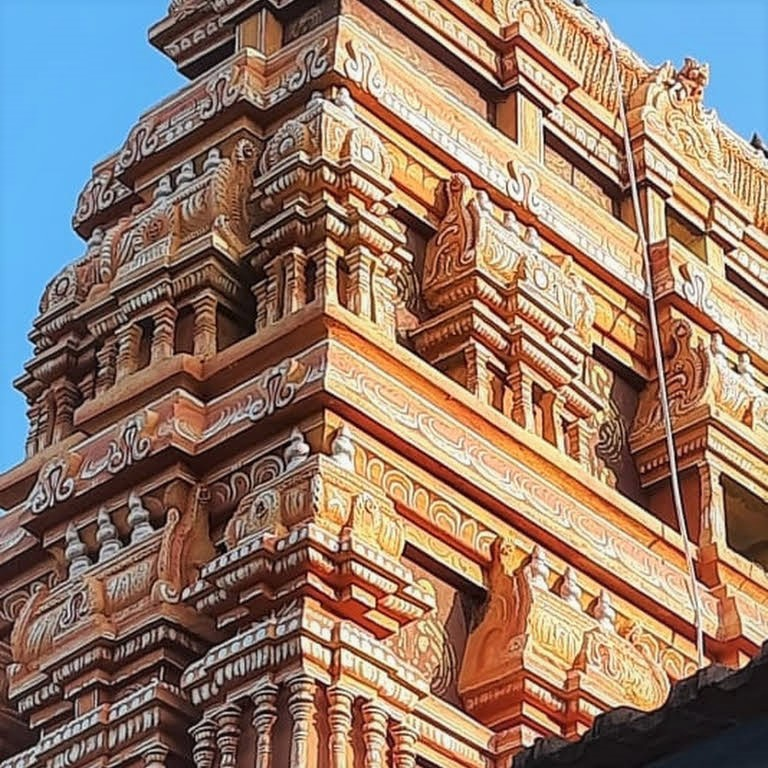
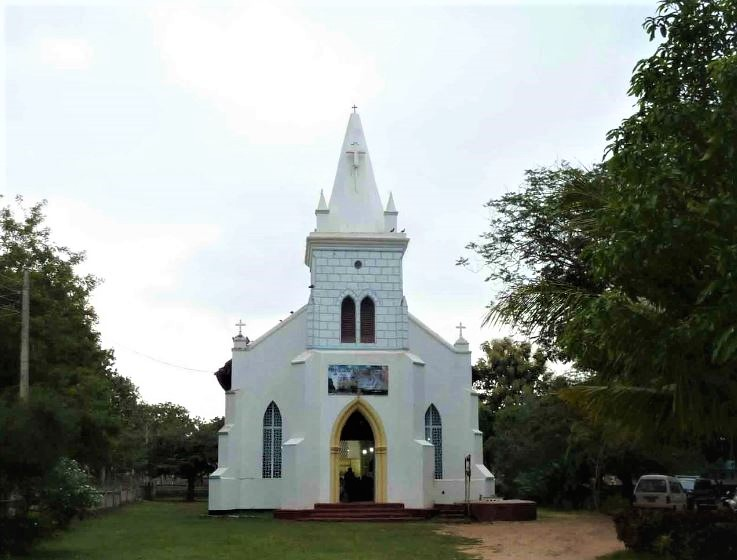
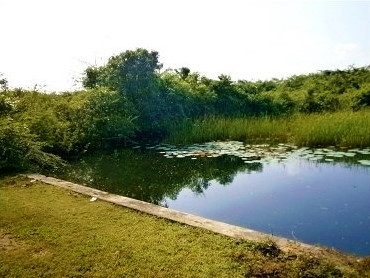
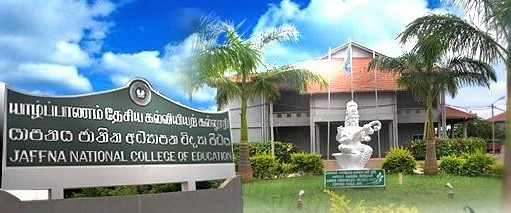
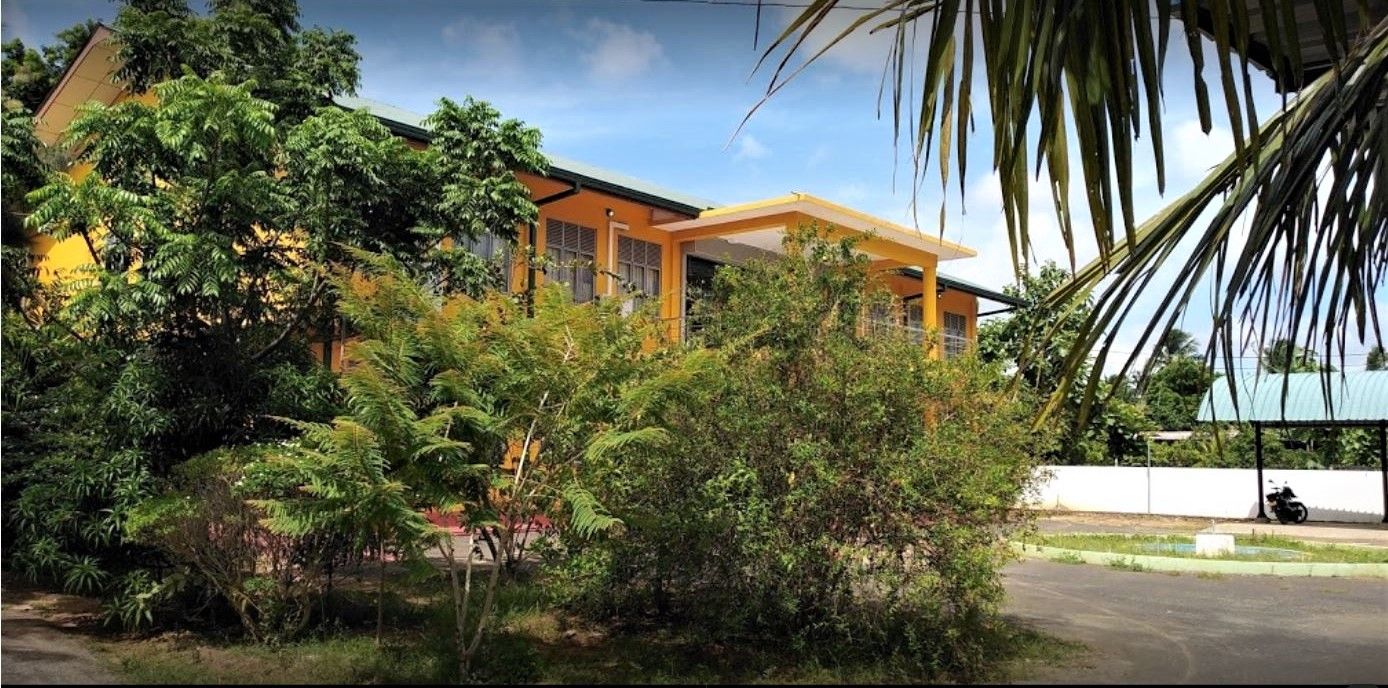
- From top left to right: Vada Kovai Verakaththi Vinayakar Kovil, Kopay St Mary's Church, Kuthiyadi Kulam – A royal swimming pool, Jaffna National College of Education, Divisional Secretariat Building
- Motto: Dedicated Public Service
- Location within Northern Province
- Coordinates: 9°41′0″N 80°03′0″E
- Country: Sri Lanka
- Province: Northern
- District: Jaffna
- DS Division: Valikamam East

Government
  - Type: Valikamam East Pradeshiya Sabha
- Elevation: 5 m (16 ft)

Population
  - Total: 10,128
- Time zone: UTC+5:30 (Sri Lanka Standard Time Zone)

Kopay (Tamil: கோப்பாய், romanized: Kōppāy) is a Sri Lankan town about 4 km from the city of Jaffna along Point Pedro road. An agricultural town consisting mainly of vegetable farms, paddy fields and coconut gardens. The suburb Kopay has several scholars because of very strong schooling system. Arumuka Navalar established the school managed by Suwaminathan is famous for this. Arrival of Church Missionary Society (CMS) strengthened the educational system. Kopay Christian College is one of the oldest schools in Jaffna with 150 years of service remain unbeaten in producing quality scholars.

During the Sri Lankan civil war, Kopay was also known as the place where the Liberation Tigers of Tamil Eelam (LTTE) built their first war cemetery (known as Maaveerar Thuyilum Illam) for their dead fighters when they controlled the Jaffna peninsula in the early 1990s. This cemetery was destroyed by the Sri Lankan armed forces in 1996 after they captured the Jaffna peninsula from the LTTE. The cemetery was then rebuilt in 2002 during the ceasefire period. However, after the end of the Sri Lankan civil war, the Sri Lankan armed forces completely demolished the cemetery in July 2010, and also built an army base on the site of the cemetery.

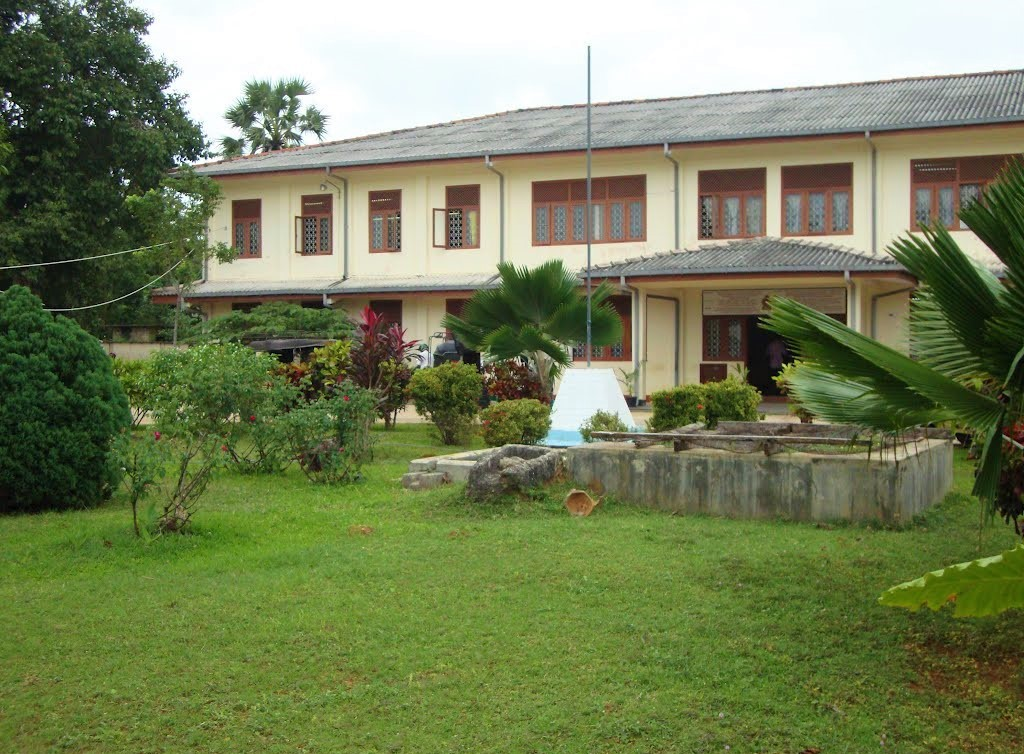
Kopay Divisional Secretariat

== Etymology ==
Kopay was the 2nd capital of the Jaffna Kingdom while Nallur was the capital. The name Kopay derives from the two Tamil words kō meaning "king" and pāy meaning "seat", which it gained because the kings of Aryacakravarti dynasty of Jaffna Kingdom had their residence here. King Cankili I had his stronghold at the fort previously located in Kopay.

== History ==
The Arya Cakravartti, Kings of Jaffna, for the purpose of defending their country against all enemies had forts erected at Nallur and Kopay. Kopay fort lies on the Point Petro Road, 150m, North of Kopay junction and at the end of a lane which goes on the right-hand side of the main road. According to Ponnampalam Ragupathy (Early Settlements in Jaffna), historiographical literature and chronicles, Kopay was a second capital for the Kings of Jaffna where they had a fort and residence. It is only about 4 km from Nallur, a place known from the Chola times and which was the capital of the Kings of Jaffna till the advent of Portuguese. The word Kopay may possibly render a meaning the residence of the King (Ko-king; Pay-seat).

In the 16th century, during the struggle between the Arya Cakravartti, Kings of Jaffna, and the Portuguese, the Arya Cakravarttis used the Kopy fort as their main defence centre, especially during the period of King Cankili Raja (I) Segarasasekaram. He stationed one section of his troops at Nallur, as he feared that the Portuguese might invade the Kingdom again. The strategic position of Kopay made the King to choose it as an important defence centre in times of war. According to Joao Ribeiro (Army Captain) the Portuguese historian and Sir Paul E. Pieris, in 1560 when King Cankili Raja (I) Segarasasekaram’s forces launched repeated onslaughts against the fort at Kopay, they used ladders made of arecanut trees to scale the walls of the citadel.

Later fortress at Kopay was also captured and destroyed by the Portuguese. Both Nallur and Kopay are along the Upparu lagoon. The site of the Palace inside the Kopay fort, marked with archaeological remains, was known as "Raasa Maaligai" (Royal Palace). Kopay fort had some remains of foundations and some small dilapidated walls. At present everything has been erased and place has been transformed into a place of cultivation of crops. The evidences of bricks and stones, found at the place confirm that a building structure existed there earlier and the adjacent tank which was renovated from time to time, now lies as a waste plot covered with shrubs, bushes and other plants.

== Education ==
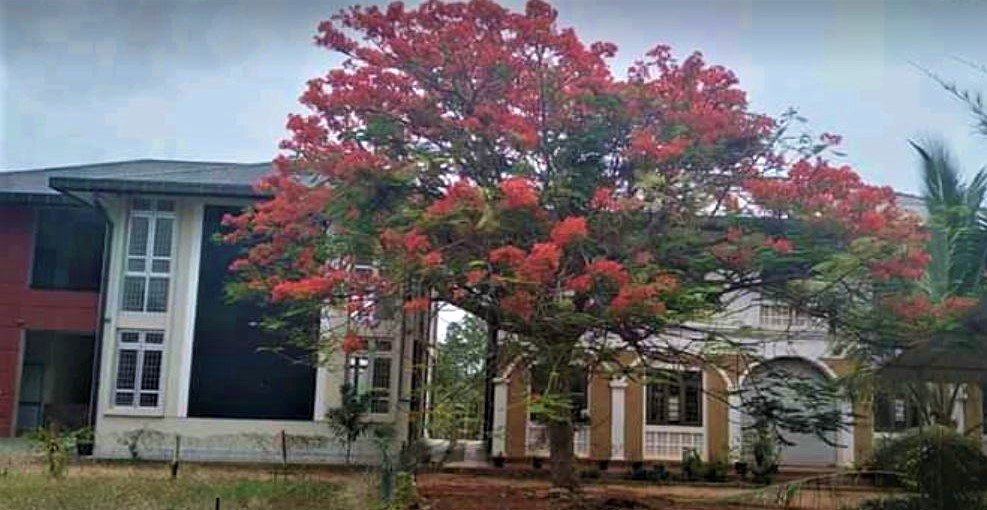
Kopay Christian College

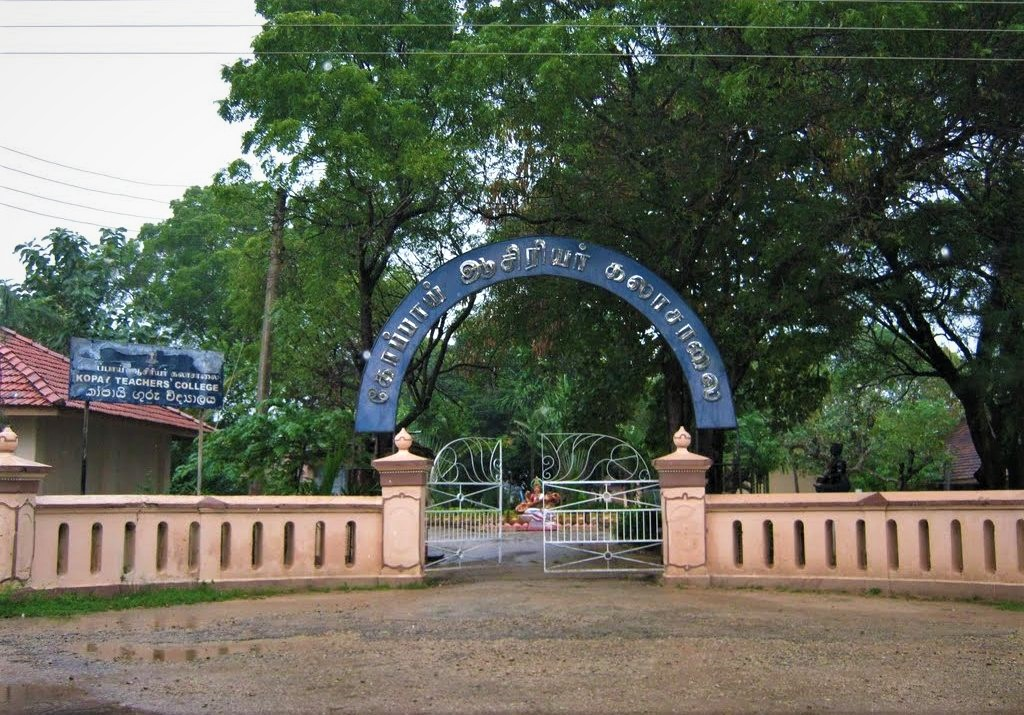
Teachers Training College, Kopay

Kopay Christian College was founded in 1852 and it is one of the oldest High Schools in Sri Lanka established by the Church Missionary Society (CMS). This is the school where many old leaders studied in the late 19th century and early 20th century.

Renowned philosopher and theologian Nallur Late. Srilasri Arumuga Navalar (1822–1879) is the founder of Kopay Navalar Boys School in 1872. Late.Murugasar Swaminathan J.P. was the founder of Kopay Saraswathy Girls' School in (1910). Later, both Swaminathan and Hon.C. W. Thamotharampillai who he was a High Court Judge and a renowned poet, amalgamated two schools in 1915 and named as Navalar Hindu Tamil Mixed School in Kopay.

National College of Education (NCOE) is renovated in a donated land of Hon. Dharmalingam Siddarthan, Member of Parliament in 2001. Ministry of Education Sri Lanka is approved the proposal to establish a building with the funding of World Bank for 465 million Sri Lankan rupees. But the World Bank refused to provide the total sum because of the Sri Lankan Civil War and provided 35 million rupees to the NCOE. With the financial help of Dr Aaru Thirumurugan along with Sivayogam Trust – London Muthumari Amman Temple, and donation from former Hindu Affairs Minister T. Maheswaran, NCOE is re-established in December 2004.

Kopay Teachers' Training college is formerly known as 'Central Teachers College' which is established by Late.Murugesar Swaminathan.J.P in 1881.

It is one of the largest training college for teachers in the country.

List of Educations in Kopay

- National College of Education, Jaffna
- Teachers Training College, Kopay
- Kopay Christian College

== Religion ==
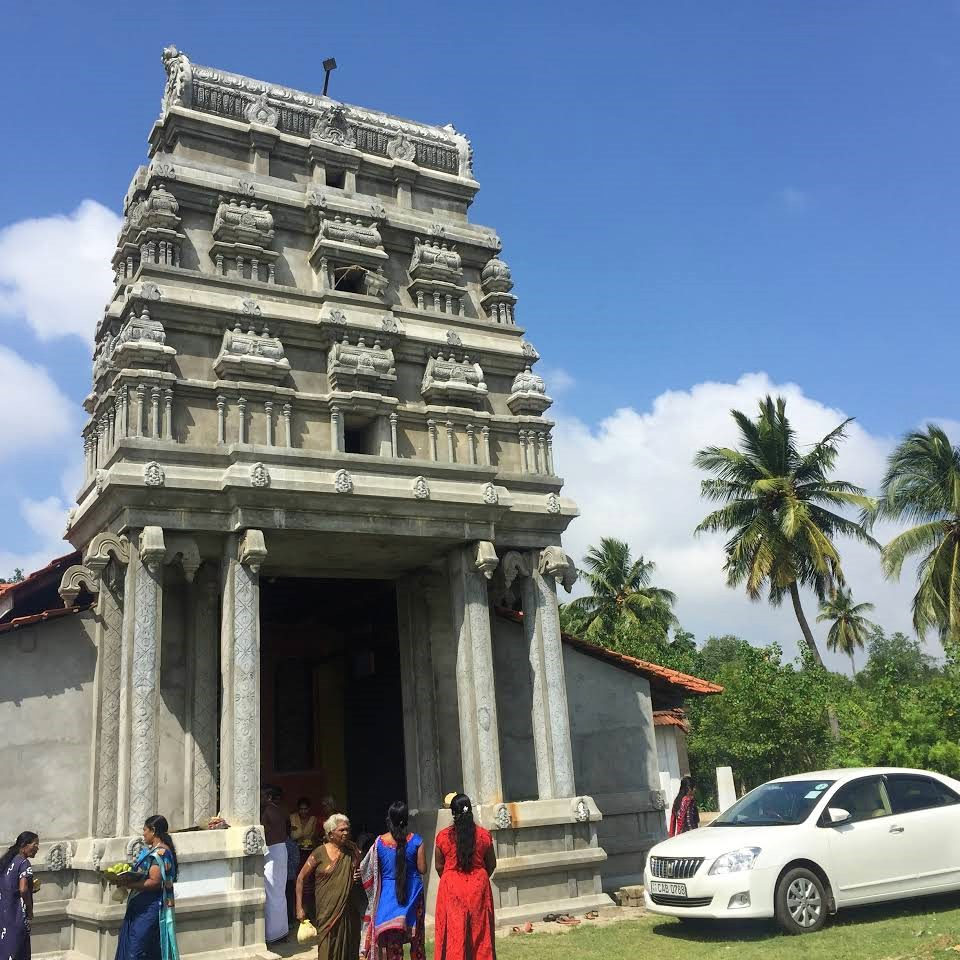
Vada Kovai Verakaththi Vinayakar Temple

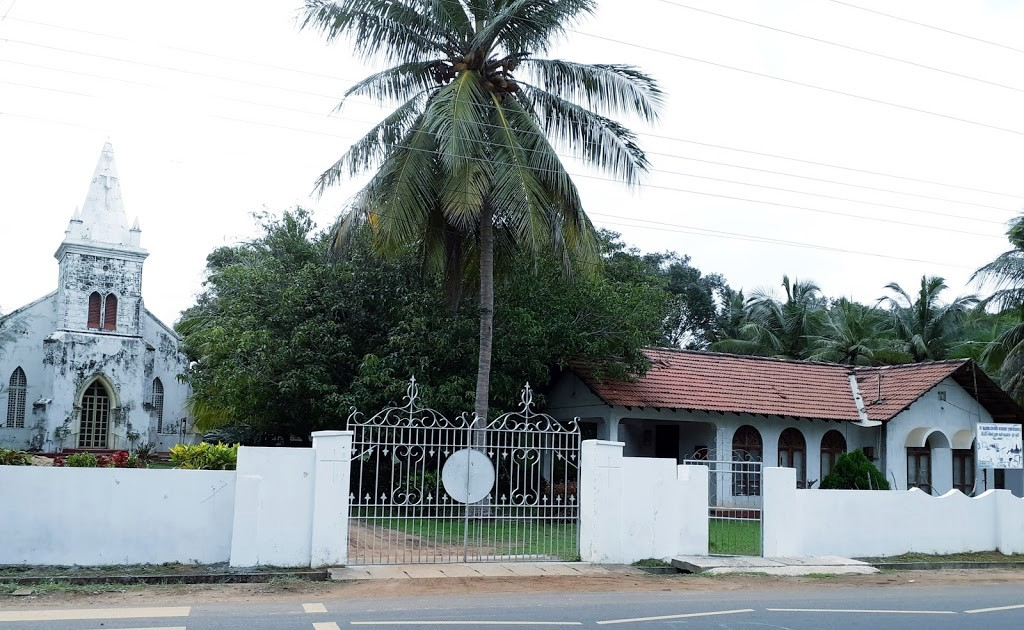
Kopay St Mary's Church, 1854

Kopay has traditionally been Hindus belonging the Shaivite tradition with a large number of Hindu temples along with small but influential number of Catholics. The well-known Kopay Palanai Kanagai Amman Kovil (AD 135), Vada Kovai Verakaththi Vinayakar Kovil and St. Mary's Church (AD 1854) are examples of these.

Several temples have been established in Kopay by the Aryacakravarti dynasty of Jaffna Kingdom. There is a history from the book of Cenkuttuvan that the King who ruled Sri Lanka from AD 113 to 135 was brought Kannagi Amman statues from the Chola Kingdom and established Kopay Palani Kannagai Amman temple in the year of AD 135.

List of Temples in Kopay

- Vadakovai Verakaththi Vinayakar Kovil
- Palani Kannagai Amman Kovil
- Makilady Ukkira Vayiravar Kovil
- Kopay Kanthasuwamy Kovil
- Kopay Selva Vinayagar Kovil
- Kopay Gana Vairavar Kovil
- St. Mary's Church, Kopay
- Kopay Kirushnan Kovil
- Kopay Muthumari Amman Kovil
- Irupalai Katpaga Pillayar Kovil
- Veerapathirar Kovil
- Vellerukku Pillayar Kovil
- Kopay Naachimar Kovil

== Healthcare ==
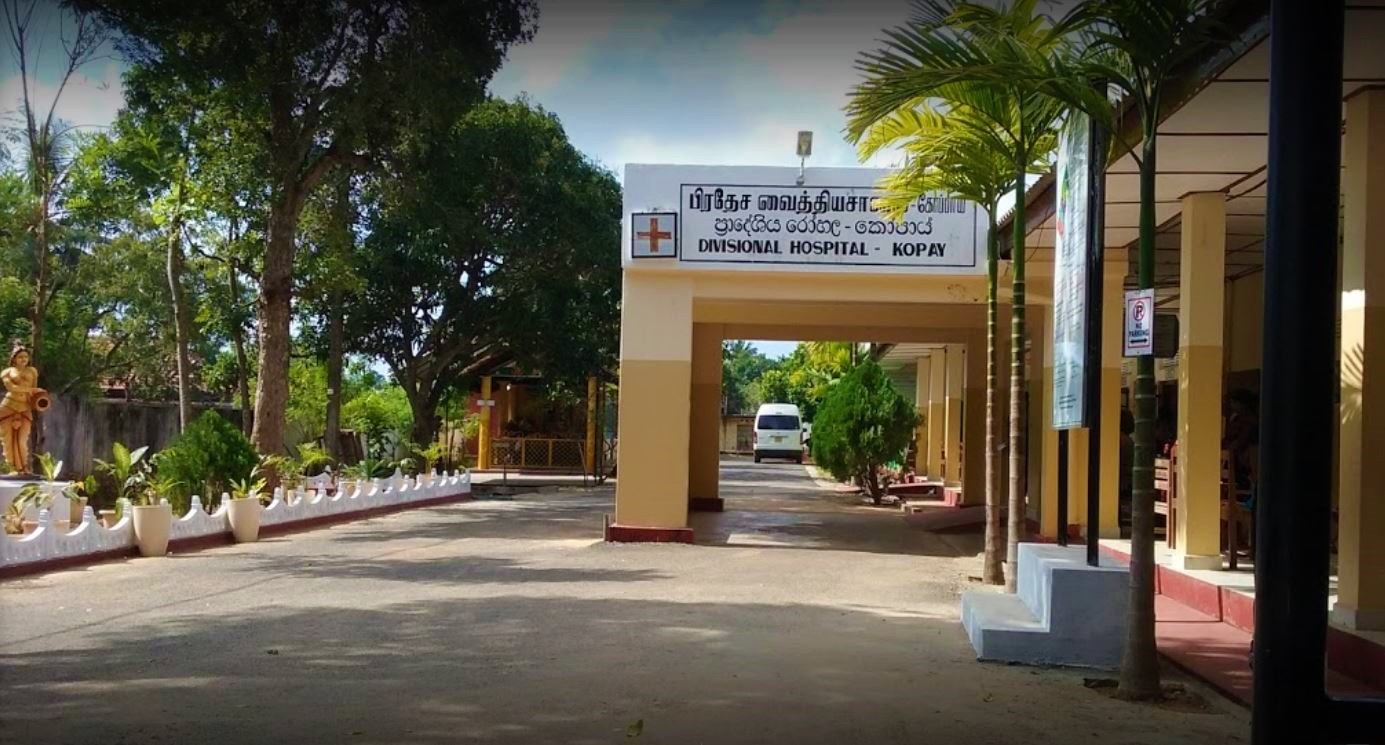
Divisional Hospital Kopay

Ministry of Health Sri Lanka operates the Public hospitals and clinics in Kopay. Kopay Base Hospital transformed as Kopay Divisional Hospital along with full facilities, and there is a Government Veterinary Office also functioning in Kopay.

== Notable people ==
- King Singai Pararasasegaram, King of Jaffna
- S. Kathiravelupillai, Sri Lankan Tamil lawyer, politician and Member of Parliament
- D.M Swaminathan, 2nd Governor of Western Province
- C. Sittampalam, Sri Lankan Tamil politician and Minister of Posts and Telecommunication
- Hon. Coomaraswamy Vanniasingam, Sri Lankan Tamil lawyer, Member of Parliament
- Murugesu Balasundaram, Sri Lankan Tamil lawyer, Member of Parliament
- C. Arulampalam, Politician and Member of Parliament
- Arumugam Murugesu Alalasundaram, Politician and Member of Parliament
- Dr. Aaru Thirumurugan, Renowned Speaker, Pundit and Hindu Social Activist
- Shenthuran, Peace Ambassador for Sri Lanka

== See also ==
- Kopay Electoral District

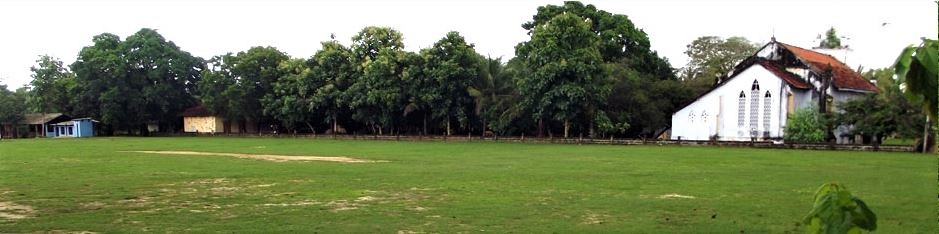
Playground of Kopay Christian College and backside of St. Mary's Church, Kopay
