= Anti-sri campaigns =

Protests by the Tamils of Sri Lanka against sri-numbered license plates

- Date: December 1956 - March 1957 (first campaign); March - May 1958 (second campaign)
- Location: Sri Lanka
- Caused by: Introduction of sri (ශ්‍රී)-numbered vehicles to the Northern and Eastern Provinces
- Goals: Cessation of sri-numbered vehicles being used in the North and East; Introduction of shri-numbered vehicles
- Methods: Tar brushing, boycotting, satyagraha
- Result: Failure; vehicles continued to use sri on license plates until 2000

Parties
Federal Party, Sri Lankan Tamil protesters, Indian Tamil protesters	Government of Sri Lanka	Sinhalese Pro-"Sri" protesters

Lead figures
Federal Party; S. J. V. Chelvanayakam; E. M. V. Naganathan	Prime Minister S. W. R. D. Bandaranaike; Transport Minister Maithripala Senanayake	K. M. P. Rajaratna

Casualties
- Death: 0 (first campaign); 5 (second campaign)

The anti-sri campaigns were two campaigns organized by the Federal Party to protest vehicles with Sinhala sri (ශ්‍රී) on their license plates being sent to Northern and Eastern Provinces. The first campaign, December 1956 - March 1957, opposed the use of sri on cars while the second, March - May 1958, opposed the use on state buses. Protest methods included tarring out the sri and replacing it with a Tamil shri (ஸ்ரீ), waylaying vehicles that used the sri, and boycotting buses. While the first campaign occurred with little drama, the second led to a fierce Sinhalese pro-sri response against Tamils in the south. During the latter campaign, mob action, clashes, and police shootings led to vandalism, damage to property, injuries, and five deaths. The campaigns, especially the second, had widespread support and participation from Sri Lankan Tamils.

== First anti-sri campaign ==
Following the introduction of the Sinhala Only Act in June 1956, the Sri Lankan government mandated that all vehicles throughout the country be marked with a sri on their license plates after being requested by the Sinhalese chauvinist group Sinhala Jatika Sangamaya. This attracted criticism from G. G. Ponnambalam, who asked Tamils to use the shri instead. The first anti-Sri campaign began in December 1956, following the introduction of "sri" to car license plates. Vehicles travelling in Tamil areas with the new plate were stoned or waylaid. In January 1957, a group of satyagrahis in Jaffna blocked the Jaffna prisoner superintendent's car, bearing a sri, and demanded that he used either the previous Roman lettering or use the Tamil shri. Tamil-owned vehicles with Roman or Sinhalese lettering were substituted with the Tamil shri, but government or Sinhalese-owned vehicles were spared. Despite the campaign being openly done in front of the police, they did nothing about it, and no one was prosecuted for having the shri on their license plate. Even a car in which Prime Minister S. W. R. D. Bandaranaike travelled in Batticaloa was marked with a shri.

By the end of the campaign, 20 vehicles, mostly owned by Tamil politicians, had their license plate changed. Some Sinhalese retaliated by tarring sri on Tamil businesses, but the campaign fizzled away when discussions about the reasonable use of Tamil ensued. Bandaranaike's relaxation of police response to the campaign helped him carry on with Tamil leaders. The protests had provoked the Sinhala Jatika Sangamaya, who called for a boycott of Tamil businesses, but this ended when the government gave them some patronage.

== Second anti-sri campaign ==
In March 1958, Transport Minister Maithripala Senanayake had issued a directive that all state buses had to be marked with sri, and anyone who tampered with his license plates would be severely punished. About 40 of these buses were sent to the north. He justified the act by claiming that Tamil areas had few buses. However, many Tamils felt that this was an imposition of Sinhala on them. The Federal Party saw this as a violation of an earlier promise not to send sri-bearing vehicles and launched another anti-sri campaign, this time targeting the buses. The party's leader, S. J. V. Chelvanayakam, was initially opposed to the relaunching but later agreed with the decision.

An anti-anti-sri or pro-sri counter-campaign emerged among Sinhalese in the south on March 31; however, it was unruly. Vandals would go around tarring all Tamil lettering in sight, including on billboards and signs. A Tamil MP claimed that some Tamils themselves were tarred, and Bandaranaike's Cadillac itself was tarred. Within 12 hours, all of Colombo was affected by the tarring. In one case, police had to guard a street of Tamil and Indian shops in Colombo, but in many instances, police did nothing as they "were ordered not to intervene." Vehicles coming into Colombo were stopped and tarred. There were other incidents in Sinhalese-majority areas, including assaults of Tamils and looting of Tamil shops. In a letter to the press dated April 3, Vavuniya MP C. Suntharalingam complained that police had actively facilitated a pro-sri campaign in Vavuniya by workers from the Pavatkulam scheme.

Police reports cited by Justice Minister and Senator M. W. H. de Silva and Bandaranaike's recount of events in parliament shortly after the riots noted that the effects of the campaign turned deadly on April 2 when a bus with a sri was stoned by a group of Indian Tamils in Bogawantalawa. The driver took the bus to the police station, where the crowd continued to stone the bus. This provoked a police firing that killed two Indian Tamils. Another account by Savumiamoorthy Thondaman, leader of the Ceylon Workers' Congress, suggested that the group of Indian Tamils had gathered at the police station demanding the release of Indian Tamil youths who had earlier been arrested. Angered mobs of Indian Tamils attacked Sinhalese people and property in response and Sinhalese reacted similarly. Bandaranaike requested Thondaman to calm down the rioters. Thondaman went to the area and did so successfully.

On the same day, two Tamil traders had stabbed and killed two Sinhalese at Kahawatta, and Tamil boutiques were burned in the town in revenge. On April 3, a Sinhalese man was stoned to death at Hatton. All demonstrations and meetings were banned and police were put on alert, and on April 4, things were mostly calm. After a meeting between Bandaranaike and Chelvanayakam, the later returned to Jaffna four days after to call for a cessation of the anti-sri campaign. On April 6, a public meeting was held that called on the Sinhalese to fight the Federal Party and the anti-Sri campaign.

As the anti-sri campaign continued, Bandaranaike faced stiff opposition to the Bandaranaike-Chelvanayakam pact from the sangha and some in his own cabinet and party. On April 9, a group of bhikkhus squatted in front of his residence, demanding that the pact be abrogated. He succumbed to the pressure, cancelled the pact, and later used the Federal Party's anti-sri campaign to justify the decision. On the same day, he and his ministers agreed to send sri-numbered buses throughout the country with police protection.

de Silva observed that with the cancellation of the pact, the anti-sri campaign continued, but the pro-sri campaign was cooling. Some passengers refused to pay fare on sri buses. However, police took a more assertive stance this time and began arresting and releasing on bail Federal Party leaders and supporters who participated in the campaign. On April 24, a sri-related campaign by K. M. P. Rajaratna at Welimada led to rioting in the town, with Tamil line rooms in two estates being looted.

By early May 1958, labour strikes took away the public's attention from communal issues. However, when the state of emergency was declared on May 27, there were people looking to tar sri-bearing vehicles in Jaffna.

== Aftermath ==
Federal Party leader S. J. V. Chelvanayakam was imprisoned for a week in Batticaloa due to his leadership of the anti-sri campaign. When he was released, he was hailed as a hero. No one was prosecuted for participating in the pro-sri campaigns.

During the 1958 riots, educated youth in Jaffna, who had previously participated in the campaign, attacked Sinhalese shops and a Buddhist temple.

The "Sri" number plates would eventually be replaced in 2000 shifting to two English letters.
