= Welimada =

- Town
- Location of Welimada in Sri Lanka
- Coordinates: 6°54′04″N 80°55′22″E
- Country: Sri Lanka
- Province: Uva Province
- District: Badulla District
- Elevation: 1,017 m (3,337 ft)
- Time zone: UTC+5:30 (Sri Lanka Standard Time)
- Postal code: 903XX

Welimada (Sinhala: වැලිමඩ) is a town in the Badulla District of Uva Province, Sri Lanka. It is situated at an elevation of approximately 1,017 m (3,337 ft) above sea level.

Welimada is known for its natural environment, cool climate, and agricultural importance, particularly as a producer of vegetables and potatoes. The area is also associated with tea cultivation, with several tea estates located nearby.

The town serves as the administrative center for the Welimada Divisional Secretariat and lies within the jurisdiction of the Uva Province's judicial and administrative systems.

Agriculture, tourism, and tea production are contributors to the local economy. Nearby attractions include Hakgala Botanical Garden, Bomburu Ella Waterfall, and the Seetha Amman Temple.

== Administration ==
The Welimada town is now administered by the Welimada Divisional Council. Local government institutions include the divisional secretariat, a police station and a government hospital.

== Places of interest ==
- Divurumwela Old Temple
- Sthripura Cave; This cave system, located at Kiriwanagama about 16 km from Welimada, includes three caves. According to local legend, the cave had been used by the King Ravana of Sri Lanka to hide the princess Sita. According to the Ramayana, princess Sita was abducted from her husband, Prince Rama of India.
- Bomburu ella Waterfall
- Manabharana Waterfalls - Lunuwattha
- 18th Railway Tunnel
- Reservoir of Umaoya Project

== Members of parliament ==
- K. D. Sugathadasa 1947 - 1952
- M. B. Bambarapane 1952-1956
- K. M. P. Rajaratne 1956 -1965
- Percy Samaraweera (UNP) 1965-1970 and 1977-1987
- R. M. Bandara 1970 -1977
- S. A. R. Madduma Bandara (SLFP) 1989-1994
- Hema Rathnayake (PA) 1994 - 2000
- Ravindra Samaraweera (UNP) 1987-1988
- Ravindra Samaraweera (UNP) 2015–Present
- Warusawitharana Pradeep Lakshan (Youth parliament member) 2015-2016
- M.J Thuwan Kasim (Member of Youth Parliament) 2020

== See also ==
- Towns in Uva
- History of Uva Province
