= Ananda Sastralaya, Kotte =

Ananda Sastralaya
- ආනන්ද ශාස්ත්‍රාලය

Location
- Kotte; Sri Lanka
- 6°52′58″N 79°54′08″E

Information
- Type: National
- Motto: Pali: "අපපමතතා නමීයන්තී"; Appamaththā Namiyanthi (Buddhist quote from the Apramadha Vagga in the Dhammapada. ("Early man never die")
- Established: 1 January 1890; 136 years ago
- Principal: M. K. Priyashantha Maddumarala
- Grades: Class 1 - 13
- Gender: Boys
- Age range: 6 to 19
- Colors: Maroon and gold
- Affiliation: Buddhist
- Website: anandasastralaya.lk

Ananda Sastralaya (sinhala: ආනන්ද ශාස්ත්‍රාලය) is a public boys school located in Kotte, Sri Lanka. It was founded in 1890 as Kotte Buddhist English Mixed School. In 1952 a part of the school land was designated by the Government as an archaeological site since an underground residence of a Buddhist place of worship was discovered at the site.

== History ==
As the awakening of Buddhist education system in Ceylon during the 19th century, some of the leaders in the Kotte area set up a new school, Kotte Bauddha Mishra Vidyalaya - කෝට්ටේ බෞද්ධ මිශ්‍ර විද්‍යාලය (Kotte Buddhist Boys' School), on 4 November 1880. Initially, the school was operated on a small scale with very few facilities. On 1 January 1890 the Ven. Emulgama Wimalatissa Thera with Dayaka Sabha of Kotte Raja Maha Vihara proceeded to enhance the facilities of the school and changed the school's name to Kotte Bauddha (Buddhist) English Mixed School.

The first principal of the school was C. Ranasingha (1890–1903), who was followed by D. B. Jayatilaka (1903–1905). In 1910 the name of the school was changed to Jayawardena Shasthra Shalava, whilst D. J. Jayatunga (1905–1922) was appointed as the school's third principal.

After the establishment of Buddhist Theosophical Society, Jayawardena Shasthra Shalava took over the administration of the school. The administration renamed the school, Ananda Sastralaya, and appointed the former principal of Ananda College, S. P. Perera, as the school's principal.

In 1934, Dr. E. W. Adikaram, renowned educator, writer and social activist took on the duties of the principal of Ananda Sastralaya and his period was known as the golden age of the school. He made a vital contribution to the renaissance of Buddhist education. With the help of many donours and a large number of social workers, he bought another 5.3 ha (13 acres) land from the Pagoda area and built the hostel and sports ground of Ananda Sastralaya. Later, he used the resources used to mark the beginning of another Buddhist school in Kotte at that time. Later, this school was named as "Ananda Sastralaya Junior School (No. 02)".

During the second World War the school premises was taken over by the Ceylon Army for the use as an army camp. After the war, the school was re-established. Under the 1961 Parliamentary Act passed by the Government, all the educational institutes were taken under to one national system of education, whereby all the schools that were managed by the Buddhist Theosophical Society were transferred across to the Government.

In the 1960s, Stanley Thilakarathne, a former MP from Kotte (who was selected as the speaker of the parliament later) pointed out the need for a girls' college in Kotte and reserved an unused land plot in the 5.3 ha (13 acres) land in the Pagoda Ananda Sastralaya Junior School No. 2. New Girls' School was established on 11 January 1971 as "Ananda Balika Vidyalaya, Kotte."

== Past principals ==
Name of the principal	Period	Notes
C. Ranasinghe	1890–1903	Inaugural headmaster
D. B. Jayathilaka	1903–1905	
D. J Jayathunga	1905–1922	
S. P. Perera	1922–1934	
E. W. Adikaram	1934–1946	
Bernard Wickramasinghe	1945–1954	
N. W. de Costa	1953–1956	
Mahinda Palihawadana]	1956–1960	
Gunapala Wickramarathna	1961–1964	
M. C. Ariyarathna	1965–1966	
Ananda Pasqual	1966–1970	
W. T. P. Thilakarathne	1971–1988	
H. Thilakananda	1988–1989	
P. A. Lokugamage	1989–1990	
Palitha Weerasooriya	1990–1991	
E. M. Ranasinghe	1992–1995	
W. A. S. Ranasinghe	1995–1998	
W. S. Dharmasiri	1998–2001	
D. Jayaweera	2001–2002	
Ven. Abeysekara Gunarathana Thero	2002–2006	
E. J. A. P. Karunadasa	2007–2009	
M. H. N. G. Thisera	2009–2010	
Malani Samarakoon	2010–2013	First female principal
G. P. B. Liyangaskumbura	2013–2019	
Upul Jayarathne	2019–2021	
M. K. Priyashantha Maddumarala	2021- 2024	
Nilmini Hamine	2024 - present	

== Notable alumni ==
Name	Notability	Reference
Ven. Gangodawila Soma Thero	Buddhist Monk	
Milton Mallawarachchi	A popular Sri Lankan singer and a musician	
Jayalal Rohana	Actor, Director, Scriptwriter	
Gamini Lokuge	Member of parliament - Colombo (1989–present)	
Dayasena Pasqual	Member of parliament - Matugama (1956–1977)	
Reggie Ranatunga	Member of parliament - Gampaha (1989–2008)	
S. de Silva Jayasinghe	Member of parliament - Wellawatte-Galkissa (1952–1977)	
K. M. P. Rajaratne	Member of parliament - Welimada (1956–1957, 1960–1965)	
Kusuma Rajaratne	Member of parliament - Welimada (1957–1960), Uva Paranagama (1960–1965)	
Isura Devapriya	Chief Minister of Western Province (2015–present)	

== See also ==
- Ananda Balika Vidyalaya, Kotte
- Ananda Sastralaya, Matugama
- Ananda College, Colombo-10
