= Y. G. Jayasinghe =

Sri Lankan politician

Hon. Yakupitiyage Gunatilleke Jayasinghe

Member of the Ceylon Parliament for Bandarawela
- In office 19 April 1965 – 5 December 1959
- Preceded by: K. D. Sugathadasa
- Succeeded by: J. G. Gunasekera

Personal details
- Born: 4 December 1907
- Party: Lanka Sama Samaja Party
- Spouse: K. D. A. Leela
- Children: 8

Yakupitiyage Gunatilleke Jayasinghe (4 December 1907 – ?) was a Ceylonese politician. He was a member of the Parliament of Ceylon representing the Lanka Sama Samaja Party for the Bandarawela electorate.

He was the chairman of the Ettampitiya Council.

He contested the 2nd parliamentary election, held in May 1952, for the seat of Bandarawela as the Lanka Sama Samaja Party candidate. He lost the contest by 4,126 votes to the United National Party candidate, K. D. Sugathadasa.

Jayasinghe ran again at the 3rd parliamentary election, held in April 1956. This time he was successful, polling 6,805 votes (63% of the total vote), 4,143 votes clear of Sumanadasa Ratnayake, the United National Party candidate.

At the 4th parliamentary election, held on 19 March 1960, Jayasinghe contested the newly created Sorantota electorate. He failed in his attempt to capture the seat, finishing third in a field of eight, losing to K. Y. M. Wijeratne Banda of the Sri Lanka Freedom Party by 2,387 votes, only securing 1,434 votes (14% of the total vote). He did not run at the subsequent parliamentary election in July 1960.
