= K. M. P. Rajaratne =

Ceylonese lawyer, politician and parliamentary secretary

Hon. Senator K. M. P. Rajaratne

Parliamentary Secretary to the Minister of Posts, Broadcasting and Information
- In office 1956–1956

Member of the Ceylonese Parliament for Welimada
- In office 1956–1956
- Preceded by: M. B. Bambarapane
- Succeeded by: Kusuma Rajaratne
- In office 1960–1965
- Preceded by: Kusuma Rajaratne
- Succeeded by: Percy Samaraweera

Personal details
- Born: 22 October 1927
- Died: January 2011 (aged 83)
- Party: National Liberation Front
- Spouse: Kusuma
- Education: University of Ceylon
- Profession: Lawyer

Konara Mudiyanselage Podiappuhamy Rajaratne (22 October 1927 – January 2011) was a Ceylonese lawyer, politician and parliamentary secretary.

== Early life and family ==
Rajaratne was born on 22 October 1927. (Note: Another source states that Rajaratne was born on 27 October 1928.) He was educated at Ananda Sastralaya, Kotte where he met his future wife Kusuma. After school he joined the University of Ceylon, Colombo, graduating with a degree in history.

Rajaratne married Kusuma Perera on 24 August 1950. They had four children - Suhashan, Bhawanthi, Nalaka and Pramada.

== Career ==
After university Rajaratne worked as a teacher and lecturer.

Rajaratne was an ultra-Sinhala-Buddhist nationalist and was considered to be a chauvinist and anti-Tamil. He was associated with the Sinhala Language Front (Sinhala Bhasha Peramuna) which sought to make Sinhala Ceylon's sole official language. He was known as "Bhasha boy" whilst he and fellow nationalist F. R. Jayasuriya were known as the "Bhasha twins".

Rajaratne stood as a candidate for Welimada at the 1952 parliamentary election but failed to get elected after coming third. On 26 August 1955 the district court in Badulla convicted Rajaratne, who had been his own election agent at the 1952 parliamentary election, of not submitting his election expenses and fined him Rs. 100.

Rajaratne stood as the Mahajana Eksath Peramuna (MEP) candidate for Welimada at the 1956 parliamentary election. He won the election and entered Parliament. After the election he was appointed Parliamentary Secretary to the Minister of Posts, Broadcasting and Information. The new government introduced the Sinhala Only Bill which sought to replace English with Sinhala as Ceylon's official language, much to the anger of the island's Tamil population. Rajaratne was one of the leading campaigners for the Sinhala Only Bill. Initially the bill had a "Reasonable Use of Tamil" clause but when Rajaratne and Jayasuriya launched a fast unto death (upawasaya) on the steps of Parliament Prime Minister S. W. R. D. Bandaranaike removed the clause.

On 5 June 1956 a group of Tamil activists and parliamentarians, led by S. J. V. Chelvanayakam, staged a satyagraha against the Sinhala Only Act on Galle Face Green opposite the Parliament. The satyagrahis were attacked by a Sinhalese mob as the police looked on, and Illankai Tamil Arasu Kachchi (ITAK) MPs E. M. V. Naganathan and V. N. Navaratnam were thrown in the lake. The mob had been led by Rajaratne. Rajaratne resigned from the government and left the parliamentary group because of Bandaranaike's refusal to ban ITAK's march to Trincomalee in August 1956.

On 1 October 1956 an election judge ruled that the 1956 parliamentary election in Welimada was void because Rajaratne had been disqualified from being a Member of Parliament for three years following his 1955 conviction. As a result, Rajaratne lost his seat in Parliament. Rajaratne founded his own political party, the hard-line nationalist National Liberation Front (NLF)/Jathika Vimukthi Peramuna (JVP), in 1957. Following the 1958 anti-Tamil riots the NLF was banned. During the riots Rajaratne had incited a crowd in Kurunegala, saying "There are 10,000 policemen. Kill them all: then we can deal with the federalists (ITAK). They are the only people who are standing in our way." Rajaratne was placed under house arrest in Kotte.

Rajaratne contested the March 1960 parliamentary election as the NLF candidate for Welimada. He won the election and re-entered Parliament. He was re-elected at the July 1960 parliamentary election. Rajaratne forfeited his seat in Parliament for a second time, on 25 May 1961. He was however re-elected to Parliament in the ensuing by-election held on 28 June 1962.

Rajaratne lost his seat at the 1965 parliamentary election. After the election the NLF joined the United National Party (UNP) led seven party national government (hath haula) and Rajaratne's wife Kusuma, who had retained her Uva-Paranagama seat, was appointed as a parliamentary secretary. Kusuma resigned from the government when it tried to bring in a law allowing Tamil to be used in government administration. Rajaratne was later appointed to the Senate of Ceylon, serving until it was abolished.

Rajaratne and his wife gave up politics and Rajaratne became an attorney-at-law. At the 2001 parliamentary election Rajaratne was placed on the Sinhala Heritage's (Sihala Urumaya) list of National List candidates but the party failed to win any seats in Parliament. Rajaratne died in January 2011.

== Electoral history ==
Electoral history of K. M. P. Rajaratne
Election	Constituency	Party	Votes	Result
1952 parliamentary	Welimada		3,327	Not elected
1956 parliamentary	Welimada	MEP	12,336	Elected
1960 March parliamentary	Welimada	NLF	6,539	Elected
1960 July parliamentary	Welimada	NLF	7,557	Elected
1962 parliamentary by	Welimada	NLF	8,352	Elected
1965 parliamentary	Welimada	NLF	7,919	Not elected
