= Welimada Electoral District =

Electoral district in Sri Lanka between 1947 and 1989

Welimada electoral district was an electoral district of Sri Lanka between August 1947 and February 1989. The district was named after the town of Welimada in Badulla District, Uva Province. The 1978 Constitution of Sri Lanka introduced the proportional representation electoral system for electing members of Parliament. The existing 160 mainly single-member electoral districts were replaced with 22 multi-member electoral districts. Welimada electoral district was replaced by the Badulla multi-member electoral district at the 1989 general elections, the first under the proportional representation system, though Badulla continues to be a polling division of the multi-member electoral district.

== Members of Parliament ==
Key

Independent SLFP UNP

| Election | Member | Party | Term |
|---|---|---|---|
| 1947 | K. D. Sugathadasa | | 1947-1952 |
| 1952 | M. B. Bambarapane | Independent | 1952-1956 |
| 1956 | K. M. P. Rajaratne | Mahajana Eksath Peramuna | 1956-1957 |
| 1957 by-election | Kusuma Rajaratne | Independent | 1957-1960 |
| 1960 (March) | K. M. P. Rajaratne | National Liberation Front | 1960 |
| 1960 (July) | K. M. P. Rajaratne | National Liberation Front | 1960-1962 |
| 1962 by-election | K. M. P. Rajaratne | National Liberation Front | 1962-1965 |
| 1965 | Percy Samaraweera | Independent | 1965-1966 |
| 1966 by-election | Percy Samaraweera | Independent | 1966-1968 |
| 1968 by-election | Percy Samaraweera | Independent | 1968-1970 |
| 1970 | R. M. Bandara | Sri Lanka Freedom Party | 1970-1977 |
| 1977 | Percy Samaraweera | United National Party | 1977-1988 |
| 1988 by-election | Ravindra Samaraweera | United National Party | 1988-1989 |

== Elections ==
=== 1947 Parliamentary General Election ===
Results of the 1st parliamentary election held between 23 August 1947 and 20 September 1947 for the district:

| Candidate | Party | Symbol | Votes | % |
|---|---|---|---|---|
| K. D. Sugathadasa | Independent | Cartwheel | 4,242 | 40.86 |
| A. G. Divitotawela | United National Party | Hand | 4,220 | 40.64 |
| W. Pinto | | Umbrella | 1,517 | 14.61 |
| Valid Votes | | | 9,979 | 96.11 |
| Rejected Votes | | | 404 | 3.89 |
| Total Polled | | | 10,383 | 100.00 |
| Registered Electors | | | 19,978 | |
| Turnout | | | | 51.97 |

=== 1952 Parliamentary General Election ===
Results of the 2nd parliamentary election held between 24 May 1952 and 30 May 1952 for the district:

| Candidate | Party | Symbol | Votes | % |
|---|---|---|---|---|
| M. B. Bambarapane | Independent | Key | 6,314 | 40.69 |
| K. D. David Perera | United National Party | Umbrella | 5,118 | 32.98 |
| K. M. P. Rajaratne | Sri Lanka Freedom Party | Elephant | 3,327 | 21.44 |
| G. P. Perera | Lanka Sama Samaja Party | Hand | 423 | 2.73 |
| Valid Votes | | | 15,182 | 97.83 |
| Rejected Votes | | | 337 | 2.17 |
| Total Polled | | | 15,519 | 100.00 |
| Registered Electors | | | 21,220 | |
| Turnout | | | | 73.13 |

=== 1956 Parliamentary General Election ===
Results of the 3rd parliamentary election held between 5 April 1956 and 10 April 1956 for the district:

| Candidate | Party | Symbol | Votes | % |
|---|---|---|---|---|
| K. M. P. Rajaratne | Mahajana Eksath Peramuna | Hand | 12,336 | 69.98 |
| M. B. Bambarapane | United National Party | Elephant | 4,318 | 24.50 |
| M. D. Perera | | Cartwheel | 770 | 4.37 |
| Valid Votes | | | 17,424 | 98.85 |
| Rejected Votes | | | 203 | 1.15 |
| Total Polled | | | 17,627 | 100.00 |
| Registered Electors | | | 27,774 | |
| Turnout | | | | 63.47 |

=== 1957 Parliamentary By-election ===
Results of the parliamentary by-election held on 7 September 1957 for the district:

| Candidate | Party | Symbol | Votes | % |
|---|---|---|---|---|
| Kusuma Rajaratne | Independent | Cartwheel | 14,069 | 80.55 |
| M. B. A. Jayasundara | Sri Lanka Freedom Party | Hand | 2,616 | 14.98 |
| K. L. Dalpathadu | United National Party | Elephant | 642 | 3.68 |
| Valid Votes | | | 17,327 | 99.20 |
| Rejected Votes | | | 140 | |
| Total Polled | | | 17,467 | 100.00 |
| Registered Electors | | | 27,774 | |
| Turnout | | | | 62.89 |

=== 1960 (March) Parliamentary General Election ===
Results of the 4th parliamentary election held on 19 March 1960 for the district:

| Candidate | Party | Symbol | Votes | % |
|---|---|---|---|---|
| K. M. P. Rajaratne | National Liberation Front | Aeroplane | 6,539 | 53.83 |
| A. G. Divitotawela | United National Party | Elephant | 3,838 | 31.59 |
| M. B. A. Jayasundera | | Cartwheel | 554 | 4.56 |
| Wilfred de Silva | | Key | 549 | 4.52 |
| K. M. K. P. S. A. Moulana | | Ladder | 229 | 1.89 |
| B. Gabriel Perera | | Scales | 159 | 1.31 |
| D. B. S. Dambadeniya | | Umbrella | 72 | 0.59 |
| Valid Votes | | | 11,940 | 98.29 |
| Rejected Votes | | | 208 | 1.71 |
| Total Polled | | | 12,148 | 100.00 |
| Registered Electors | | | 14,799 | |
| Turnout | | | | 82.09 |

=== 1960 (July) Parliamentary General Election ===
Results of the 5th parliamentary election held on 20 July 1960 for the district:

| Candidate | Party | Symbol | Votes | % |
|---|---|---|---|---|
| K. M. P. Rajaratne | National Liberation Front | Aeroplane | 7,557 | 64.67 |
| K. N. M. Punchi Banda | United National Party | Elephant | 4,023 | 34.43 |
| Valid Votes | | | 11,580 | 99.09 |
| Rejected Votes | | | 106 | 0.91 |
| Total Polled | | | 11,686 | 100.00 |
| Registered Electors | | | 14,799 | |
| Turnout | | | | 78.96 |

=== 1962 Parliamentary By-election ===
Results of the parliamentary by-election held on 28 June 1962 for the district:

| Candidate | Party | Symbol | Votes | % |
|---|---|---|---|---|
| K. M. P. Rajaratne | National Liberation Front | Aeroplane | 8,352 | 51.81 |
| Percy Samaraweera | United National Party | Elephant | 5,178 | 32.12 |
| P. B. Ratnayake | Sri Lanka Freedom Party | Hand | 2,496 | 15.48 |
| Valid Votes | | | 16,026 | 99.42 |
| Rejected Votes | | | 94 | 0.58 |
| Total Polled | | | 16,120 | 100.00 |
| Registered Electors | | | | |
| Turnout | | | | |

=== 1965 Parliamentary General Election ===
Results of the 6th parliamentary election held on 22 March 1965 for the district:

| Candidate | Party | Symbol | Votes | % |
|---|---|---|---|---|
| Percy Samaraweera | Independent | Lamp | 8,908 | 52.454 |
| K. M. P. Rajaratne | National Liberation Front | Aeroplane | 7,919 | 46.62 |
| Valid Votes | | | 16,827 | 99.07% |
| Rejected Votes | | | 158 | 0.93 |
| Total Polled | | | 16,985 | 100.00 |
| Registered Electors | | | 20,122 | |
| Turnout | | | | 84.41 |

=== 1970 Parliamentary General Election ===
Results of the 7th parliamentary election held on 27 May 1970 for the district:

| Candidate | Party | Symbol | Votes | % |
|---|---|---|---|---|
| R. M Bandara | | | uncontested | |
| Valid Votes | | | - | - |
| Rejected Votes | | | - | - |
| Total Polled | | | - | - |
| Registered Electors | | | | |
| Turnout | | | | - |

=== 1977 Parliamentary General Election ===
Results of the 8th parliamentary election held on 21 July 1977 for the district:

| Candidate | Party | Symbol | Votes | % |
|---|---|---|---|---|
| Percy Samaraweera | United National Party | Elephant | 16,314 | 63.84 |
| R. M Bandara | Sri Lanka Freedom Party | Hand | 8,633 | 33.78 |
| B. M. M. Banda | | Star | 386 | 1.51 |
| A. R. Wijesinghe | | Cartwheel | 106 | 0.41 |
| Valid Votes | | | 25,439 | 99.55 |
| Rejected Votes | | | 116 | 0.45 |
| Total Polled | | | 25,555 | 100.00 |
| Registered Electors | | | 28,652 | |
| Turnout | | | | 89.19 |
