= Soranatota Electoral District =

Electoral district of Sri Lanka

Soranatota electoral district was an electoral district of Sri Lanka between March 1960 and July 1977. The district was named after the town of Soranatota in Badulla District, Uva Province. The 1978 Constitution of Sri Lanka introduced the proportional representation electoral system for electing members of Parliament. The existing 160 mainly single-member electoral districts were replaced with 22 multi-member electoral districts. Soranatota electoral district was replaced by the Badulla multi-member electoral district at the 1989 general elections.

== Members of Parliament ==
Key

Independent SLFP UNP

Election	Member	Party	Term
1960 (March)	K. Y. M. Wijeratne Banda	SLFP	1960
1960 (July)	S. B. Ekanayake	UNP	1960 - 1965
1965	K. Y. M. Wijeratne Banda	SLFP	1965 - 1989
1970	K. Y. M. Wijeratne Banda	SLFP	1965 - 1989

== Elections ==
=== 1960 (March) Parliamentary General Election ===
Results of the 4th parliamentary election held on 19 March 1960:

Candidate	Party	Symbol	Votes	%
K. Y. M. Wijeratne Banda	Sri Lanka Freedom Party	Hand	3,821	36.80
S. B. Ekanayake	United National Party	Elephant	3,229	31.10
Y. G. Jayasinghe	Lanka Sama Samaja Party	Key	1,434	13.81
K. G. Dias		Cartwheel	725	6.98
T. B. Katugaha		Sun	542	5.22
T. M. A. Ratnayake		Omnibus	187	1.80
P. B. A. Lankatilaka		Umbrella	112	1.08
Weerawanni Jinadasa		Pair of Scales	103	0.99
Valid Votes			10,151	97.77
Rejected Votes			232	2.23
Total Polled			10,383	100.00
Registered Electors			14,074	
Turnout				73.77

=== 1960 (July) Parliamentary General Election ===
Results of the 5th parliamentary election held on 20 July 1960:

Candidate	Party	Symbol	Votes	%
S. B. Ekanayake	United National Party	Elephant	4,539	
K. Y. M. Wijeratne Banda	Sri Lanka Freedom Party	Hand	4,330	
K. D. Sugathadasa	Lanka Prajathanthravadi Pakshaya	Umbrella	1,017	
B. D. P. Wijewardena		Rooster		
Valid Votes				100.00%
Rejected Votes				
Total Polled				
Registered Electors				
Turnout				

=== 1965 Parliamentary General Election ===
Results of the 6th parliamentary election held on 22 March 1965:

Candidate	Party	Symbol	Votes	%
K. Y. M. Wijeratne Banda	Sri Lanka Freedom Party	Hand	6,901	
S. B. Ekanayake	United National Party	Elephant	6,023	
K. D. Sugathadasa	Lanka Prajathanthravadi Pakshaya	Umbrella	903	
W. H. B. Katubulla		Aeroplane	522	
Chandragupta Rambukpota		Lamp	228	
K. B. Herath		Cartwheel	183	
Valid Votes				100.00%
Rejected Votes			139	
Total Polled				
Registered Electors				
Turnout				

=== 1970 Parliamentary General Election ===
Results of the 7th parliamentary election held on 27 May 1970:

Candidate	Party	Symbol	Votes	%
K. Y. M. Wijeratne Banda	Sri Lanka Freedom Party	Hand		
R. M. Abeykoon	United National Party	Elephant		
S. B. Ekanayake		Umbrella		
Valid Votes				100.00%
Rejected Votes				
Total Polled				
Registered Electors				
Turnout				
