= Maaveerar Naal =

Sri Lankan Tamil observance, 27 November

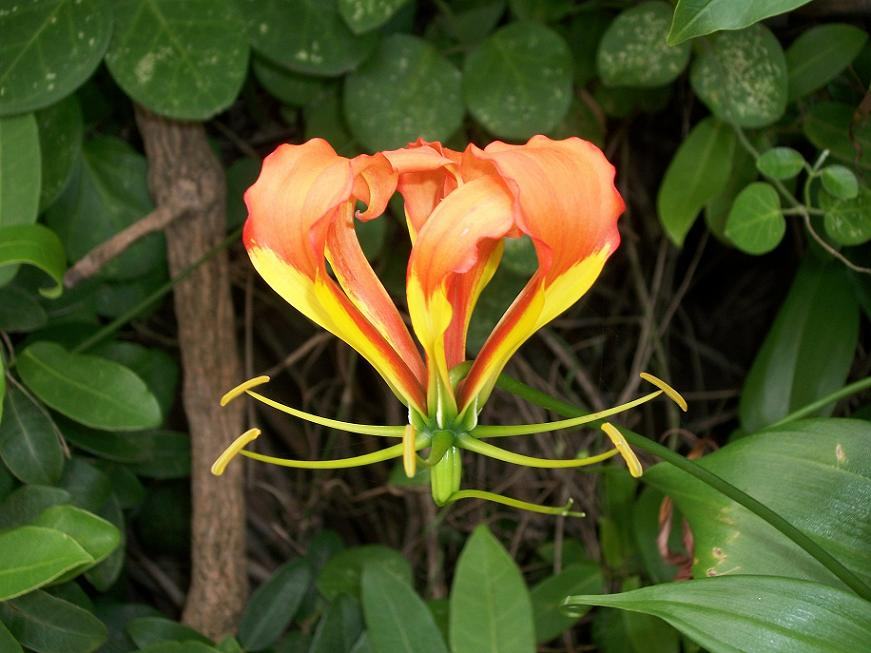
- Gloriosa superba is the symbol of Maaveerar Naal
- Official name: மாவீரர் நாள்
- Observed by: Sri Lankan Tamils, Tamils
- Date: 27 November
- Next time: 27 November 2026
- Frequency: annual

Maaveerar Naal (Great Heroes' Day; Tamil: மாவீரர் நாள் Māvīrar Nāḷ) is a remembrance day observed by Sri Lankan Tamils to remember the deaths of militants who fought with the Liberation Tigers of Tamil Eelam (LTTE) to achieve an independent Tamil homeland. It is held each year on 27 November, the date on which the first LTTE cadre, Lt. Shankar (Sathiyanathan alias Suresh), died in combat in 1982. Traditionally oil lamps are lit for the three days ending on 27 November and the Tamil Eelam flag is raised at ceremonies. The symbol for Maaveerar Naal is the Gloriosa superba which blooms during November.

== History ==
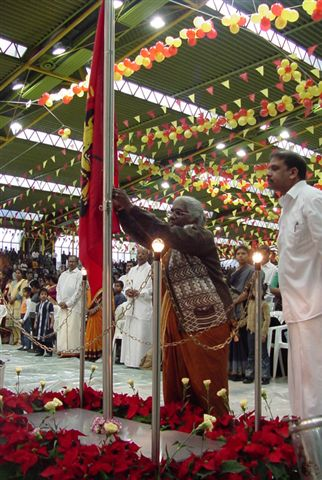
A mother of a martyred LTTE cadre raises the Tamil Eelam flag on Maaveerar Naal 2002 in Germany

The first Maaveerar Naal was held on 27 November 1989. The date was chosen as it was the anniversary of the first LTTE cadre to die in combat, Lt. Shankar (Sathiyanathan alias Suresh), who died on 27 November 1982. On 27 November 1989 around 600 LTTE cadres gathered secretly in the jungles near Nithikaikulam in Manal Aru, Mullaitivu District, to remember their fallen comrades who at that time numbered around 1,300. In his speech LTTE leader V. Prabhakaran told the gathering that if he ever betrayed Tamil Eelam they must kill him.

Following the withdrawal of the Indian Peace Keeping Force in 1990 the LTTE gained controlled of large areas of territory in the north and east of Sri Lanka. The LTTE started developing ways to commemorate its dead heroes. They built thuyilum illam (resting place) for their maaveerar (great heroes) in territory they controlled. In 1991 the week leading up to Maaveerar Naal was declared Great Heroes' Week. This resulted in Prabhakaran's birthday, which falls on 26 November, being included in the commemorations. The celebration of Prabhakaran's birthday began to overshadow the Maaveerar Naal commemorations to an extent that some even believed that Maaveerar Naal was a celebration of Prabhakaran's birthday. This resulted in Prabhakaran banning any celebration of his birthday. Commemorations eventually started amongst the growing Sri Lankan Tamil diaspora.

Over the years the commemorations became more elaborate, involving meetings, religious rituals, processions and exhibitions with cut-outs, posters and handbills of the dead cadres being distributed widely. Every village and every school were expected commemorate their dead cadres. Families of the dead cadres would gather at thuyilum illam to mourn their dead relatives. The culmination of the commemorations was a great function at a special location at which the reclusive Prabhakaran gave a speech which started at 6.05pm, the precise time Lt. Shankar died. The highly anticipated speeches began to take on the form of an annual policy statement by the LTTE and were broadcast on LTTE affiliated radio and TV stations in LTTE controlled areas and abroad.

After the Sri Lankan military recaptured the Jaffna Peninsula in 1995 they destroyed LTTE cemeteries, thuyilum illam, in the area including those at Chaadi, Ellangkulam, Kodikamam and Kopay. Following the start of the Norwegian mediated peace process in 2002 the LTTE started rebuilding their war cemeteries. Maaveerar Naal commemorations were allowed in government territory. In 2004 Tamil National Alliance (TNA) MPs were allowed to light oil lamps in front of the Parliament to commemorate Maaveerar Naal. However, after the peace process stalled the Sri Lankan military started imposing restrictions on Maaveerar Naal commemorations and destroying LTTE cemeteries.

=== Restrictions of celebrations ===
Following the end of the civil war in May 2009 the Sri Lankan government and its security forces have clamped down on any attempt at commemorating Maaveerar Naal and destroyed the remaining LTTE cemeteries. All Maaveerar Naal commemorations have been banned. Critics of the ban argue that the Sri Lankan government is denying the Tamil people the basic human right to mourn their dead. The ban on commemorations has been criticised by the TNA, the main political party representing Sri Lankan Tamils, who point out that the commemoration of the LTTE dead is banned but that of the Janatha Vimukthi Peramuna dead is allowed. The JVP waged two violent insurrections against the Sri Lankan government - in 1971 and 1987-89 - which resulted in the death of up to 70,000 people.

On 27 November 2012 an attempt by some University of Jaffna students to commemorate Maaveerar Naal by lighting oil lamps was broken by the Sri Lankan security forces who broke the lamps, threatened the students and pointing weapons at them. The following day students staged a peaceful protest against the actions of the security forces but they were met by riot police who attacked and beat the protesters, resulting in at least 20 students being injured and four arrested.

In 2016 the Government Minister Mano Ganesan claimed that Maaveerar Naal can be celebrated as it is a human right for people to celebrate their late loved ones but it was wrong to do it with a political motive. He cited that the marxist Janatha Vimukthi Peramuna (JVP) also celebrate il Maha Viru Samaruwa in the South to commemorate their dead. However, due to the fact that the LTTE is still proscribed but JVP is no longer considered a terrorist organization the LTTE cannot be mentioned.

In 2020 according to Defence Secretary and retired Major General Kamal Gunaratne celebration would be allowed as long as they do not disrupt peace and avoid statements that instigate hatred among communities.

== Remembrance day ==
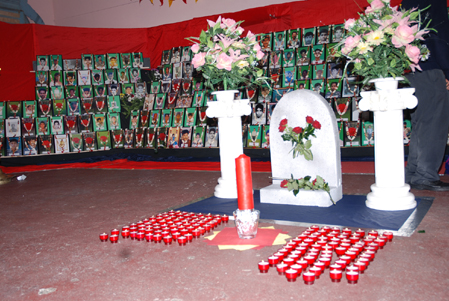
Maaveerar Naal 2006 in Germany

Despite the security restrictions Tamils in Sri Lanka hold small events to commemorate Maaveerar Naal. Tamil politicians have started a tradition of planting trees on Maaveerar Naal.

In the Indian state of Tamil Nadu, a number of political parties, youth organisations, social movement groups etc. engage themselves in organising a number of events commemorating Maaveerar Naal across the state.

Amongst the Sri Lankan Tamil diaspora, where there are no restrictions on commemorating Maaveerar Naal, large public gatherings continue to be held. In cities such as Toronto, London, Paris, Oslo, New Jersey, and Sydney, thousands of supporters come to honour those who lost their lives fighting for Tamil Eelam. In November 2014 Canadian New Democratic Party MP Rathika Sitsabaiesan was criticised for comparing Maaveerar Naal with Remembrance Day, a holiday which commemorates soldiers from Commonwealth countries who died since the First World War during a speech in the House of Commons. However, in 2021, Brampton mayor Patrick Brown commemorated Maaveerar Naal on behalf of the city.

== See also ==
- Mullivaikkal Remembrance Day
