= Bandarawela Electoral District =

Electoral district of Sri Lanka

Bandarawela electoral district was an electoral district of Sri Lanka between August 1947 and February 1989. The district was named after the town of Bandarawela in Badulla District, Uva Province. The 1978 Constitution of Sri Lanka introduced the proportional representation electoral system for electing members of Parliament. The existing 160 mainly single-member electoral districts were replaced with 22 multi-member electoral districts. Bandarawela electoral district was replaced by the Badulla multi-member electoral district at the 1989 general elections, the first under the proportional representation system.

== Members of Parliament ==
Key

Independent SLFP UNP

Election	Member	Party	Term
1947	K. V. Nadarajah		1947 - 1952
1952	K. D. Sugathadasa	UNP	1952 - 1956
1956	Y. G. Jayasinghe	LSSP	1956 - 1960
1960 (March)	J. G. Gunasekera	SLFP	1960 - 1966
1960 (July)	J. G. Gunasekera	SLFP	1960 - 1966
1965	J. G. Gunasekera	SLFP	1960 - 1966
1966 by-election	R. M. Appuhamy	SLFP	1966 - 1977
1970	R. M. Appuhamy	SLFP	1966 - 1977
1977	R. M. Appuhamy	UNP	1977 - 1989

== Elections ==
=== 1947 Parliamentary General Election ===
Results of the 1st parliamentary election held between 23 August 1947 and 20 September 1947:

Candidate	Party	Symbol	Votes	%
K. V. Nadarajah	Independent	Hand	5,092	60.55
M. P. Yapa	Independent	Umbrella	2,897	34.45
K. B. H. Adhikaritilak	Independent	Elephant	181	2.15
Valid Votes			8,170	97.16
Rejected Votes			239	2.84
Total Polled			8,409	100.0
Registered Electors			14,311	
Turnout				58.76

=== 1952 Parliamentary General Election ===
Results of the 2nd parliamentary election held between 24 May 1952 and 30 May 1952:

Candidate	Party	Symbol	Votes	%
K. D. Sugathadasa	United National Party	Wheel	6,392	61.84
Y. G. Jayasinghe	Lanka Sama Samaja Party	Hand	2,266	21.92
L. Jayasundera		Star	839	8.12
Tikiri Bandara Pethiyagoda	Sri Lanka Freedom Party	Elephant	670	6.48
Valid Votes			10,167	98.36
Rejected Votes			169	1.64
Total Polled			10,336	100.00
Registered Electors			13,950	
Turnout				74.09

=== 1956 Parliamentary General Election ===
Results of the 3rd parliamentary election held between 5 April 1956 and 10 April 1956:

Candidate	Party	Symbol	Votes	%
Y. G. Jayasinghe	Lanka Sama Samaja Party	Key	6,805	62.93
Sumanadasa Ratnayake		Elephant	2,662	24.62
Gladwin Kotelawala		Cartwheel	1,278	11.82
Valid Votes			10,745	99.36
Rejected Votes			69	0.64
Total Polled			10,814	100.00
Registered Electors			16,751	
Turnout				64.56

=== 1960 (March) Parliamentary General Election ===
Results of the 4th parliamentary election held on 19 March 1960:

Candidate	Party	Symbol	Votes	%
J. G. Gunasekera	Sri Lanka Freedom Party	Hand	5,603	49.56
Gladwin Kotelawala	United National Party	Elephant	2,909	25.73
D. S. Wickremasinghe		Key	1,476	13.06
M. J. Peeris		Umbrella	457	4.04
Chandra S. Perera		Cartwheel	376	3.33
T. M. Gunasekera		Eye	192	1.70
E. M. W. Gawarammana		Clock	141	1.25
Valid Votes			11,154	98.66
Rejected Votes			152	1.34
Total Polled			11,306	100.00
Registered Electors			14,106	
Turnout				80.15

=== 1960 (July) Parliamentary General Election ===
Results of the 5th parliamentary election held on 20 July 1960:

Candidate	Party	Symbol	Votes	%
J. G. Gunasekera	Sri Lanka Freedom Party	Hand	6,621	61.05
S. D. Ratnayake	United National Party	Elephant	4,147	38.24
Valid Votes			10,768	99.28
Rejected Votes			78	0.72
Total Polled			10,846	100.00
Registered Electors			14,106	
Turnout				76.89

=== 1965 Parliamentary General Election ===
Results of the 6th parliamentary election held on 22 March 1965:

Candidate	Party	Symbol	Votes	%
J. G. Gunasekera	Sri Lanka Freedom Party	Hand	8,636	49.55
Cyril Mathew Caluvadewage	United National Party	Elephant	8,488	48.70
A. M. Herath		Table	182	1.04
Valid Votes			17,306	99.30
Rejected Votes			122	0.70
Total Polled			17,428	100.00
Registered Electors			21,935	
Turnout				79.45

=== 1970 Parliamentary General Election ===
Results of the 7th parliamentary election held on 27 May 1970:

Candidate	Party	Symbol	Votes	%
R. M. Appuhamy	Sri Lanka Freedom Party	Hand	11,509	56.73
R. M. Appuhamy	United National Party	Elephant	8,569	42.23
J. G. Gunasekera		Lamp	132	0.65
Valid Votes			20,210	99.61
Rejected Votes			79	0.39
Total Polled			20,289	100.00
Registered Electors			22,912	
Turnout				88.55

=== 1977 Parliamentary General Election ===
Results of the 8th parliamentary election held on 21 July 1977:

Candidate	Party	Symbol	Votes	%
R. M. Appuhamy	United National Party	Elephant	14,106	57.64
R. M. Appuhamy	Sri Lanka Freedom Party	Hand	9,529	38.94
D. S. Wickremasinghe		Key	605	2.47
K. A. Karunaratne		Eye	132	0.54
Valid Votes			24,372	99.60
Rejected Votes			99	0.40
Total Polled			24,471	100.00
Registered Electors			28,103	
Turnout				87.08
