= Kopay Electoral District =

Electoral district of Sri Lanka

Kopay Electoral District was an electoral district of Sri Lanka between August 1947 and February 1989. The district was named after the town of Kopay in Jaffna District, Northern Province. The 1978 Constitution of Sri Lanka introduced the proportional representation electoral system for electing members of Parliament. The existing 160 mainly single-member electoral districts were replaced with 22 multi-member electoral districts. Kopay electoral district was replaced by the Jaffna multi-member electoral district at the 1989 general elections, the first under the PR system, though Kopay continues to be a polling division of the multi-member electoral district.

== Members of Parliament ==
Key

ACTC ITAK TULF

Election	Member	Party	Term
1947	C. Vanniasingam	All Ceylon Tamil Congress	1947-1952
1952	C. Vanniasingam	Illankai Tamil Arasu Kachchi	1952-1956
1956	C. Vanniasingam	Illankai Tamil Arasu Kachchi	1956-1960
1960 (March)	M. Balasundaram	Illankai Tamil Arasu Kachchi	1960-1960
1960 (July)	M. Balasundaram	Illankai Tamil Arasu Kachchi	1960-1965
1965	S. Kathiravelupillai	Illankai Tamil Arasu Kachchi	1965-1970
1970	S. Kathiravelupillai	Illankai Tamil Arasu Kachchi	1970-1977
1977	S. Kathiravelupillai	Tamil United Liberation Front	1977-1989

== Elections ==
=== 1947 Parliamentary General Election ===
Results of the 1st parliamentary election held between 23 August 1947 and 20 September 1947:

Candidate	Party	Symbol	Votes	%
C. Vanniasingam	All Ceylon Tamil Congress	Elephant	9,619	58.90%
S. Rasaratnam	United National Party	Hand	5,266	32.24%
C. Ragunathan	Independent	Cart Wheel	1,447	8.86%
Valid Votes			16,332	100.00%
Rejected Votes			276	
Total Polled			16,608	
Registered Electors			32,999	
Turnout			50.33%	

=== 1952 Parliamentary General Election ===
Results of the 2nd parliamentary election held between 24 May 1952 and 30 May 1952:

Candidate	Party	Symbol	Votes	%
C. Vanniasingam	Illankai Tamil Arasu Kachchi	Key	9,410	44.89%
C. Arulampalam	All Ceylon Tamil Congress	Elephant	9,200	43.88%
R. R. Dharmaratnam		Star	2,354	11.23%
Valid Votes			20,964	100.00%
Rejected Votes			283	
Total Polled			21,247	
Registered Electors			32,903	
Turnout			64.57%	

=== 1956 Parliamentary General Election ===
Results of the 3rd parliamentary election held between 5 April 1956 and 10 April 1956:

Candidate	Party	Symbol	Votes	%
C. Vanniasingam	Illankai Tamil Arasu Kachchi	House	12,804	53.83%
C. Arulampalam		Umbrella	10,983	46.17%
Valid Votes			23,787	100.00%
Rejected Votes			304	
Total Polled			24,091	
Registered Electors			34,465	
Turnout			69.90%	

C. Vanniasingam died on 17 September 1959.

=== 1960 (March) Parliamentary General Election ===
Results of the 4th parliamentary election held on 19 March 1960:

Candidate	Party	Symbol	Votes	%
M. Balasundaram	Illankai Tamil Arasu Kachchi	House	10,279	48.63%
T. Gunaratnam	All Ceylon Tamil Congress	Bicycle	4,936	23.35%
S. K. Nallathamby		Sun	3,494	16.53%
K. V. S. Shanmuganathan	Lanka Sama Samaja Party	Key	1,777	8.41%
S. P. Nadarajah	Communist Party	Star	458	2.17%
S. Sivasubramaniam		Cockerel	192	0.91%
Valid Votes			21,136	100.00%
Rejected Votes			351	
Total Polled			21,487	
Registered Electors			27,858	
Turnout			77.13%	

=== 1960 (July) Parliamentary General Election ===
Results of the 5th parliamentary election held on 20 July 1960:

Candidate	Party	Symbol	Votes	%
M. Balasundaram	Illankai Tamil Arasu Kachchi	House	12,088	67.64%
T. Gunaratnam	All Ceylon Tamil Congress	Bicycle	5,782	32.36%
Valid Votes			17,870	100.00%
Rejected Votes			188	
Total Polled			18,058	
Registered Electors			27,858	
Turnout			64.82%	

=== 1965 Parliamentary General Election ===
Results of the 6th parliamentary election held on 22 March 1965:

Candidate	Party	Symbol	Votes	%
S. Kathiravelupillai	Illankai Tamil Arasu Kachchi	House	12,339	51.93%
T. Gunaratnam	All Ceylon Tamil Congress	Bicycle	8,230	34.64%
M. Thurairajah	Lanka Sama Samaja Party	Key	2,625	11.05%
M. Balasundaram		Umbrella	568	2.39%
Valid Votes			23,762	100.00%
Rejected Votes			361	
Total Polled			24,123	
Registered Electors			33,091	
Turnout			72.90%	

=== 1970 Parliamentary General Election ===
Results of the 7th parliamentary election held on 27 May 1970:

Candidate	Party	Symbol	Votes	%
S. Kathiravelupillai	Illankai Tamil Arasu Kachchi	House	16,428	55.85%
T. Gunaratnam	All Ceylon Tamil Congress	Bicycle	11,288	38.38%
M. S. Kanagasundaram		Pair of Scales	983	3.34%
M. Thurairajah	Sri Lanka Freedom Party	Hand	713	2.42%
Valid Votes			29,412	100.00%
Rejected Votes			189	
Total Polled			29,601	
Registered Electors			37,464	
Turnout			79.01%	

=== 1977 Parliamentary General Election ===
Results of the 8th parliamentary election held on 21 July 1977:

Candidate	Party	Symbol	Votes	%
S. Kathiravelupillai	Tamil United Liberation Front	Sun	25,840	77.20%
V. Nadarajah	Lanka Sama Samaja Party	Key	3,487	10.42%
S. Jeganathan	United National Party	Elephant	2,699	8.06%
V. T. Jeyadevan	Independent	Ship	1,444	4.31%
Valid Votes			33,470	100.00%
Rejected Votes			149	
Total Polled			33,619	
Registered Electors			41,824	
Turnout			80.38%	

S. Kathiravelupillai died on 31 March 1981. His replacement M. Alalasundaram was sworn in on 23 July 1981.

M. Alalasundaram and all other TULF MPs boycotted Parliament from the middle of 1983 for a number of reasons: they were under pressure from Sri Lankan Tamil militants not to stay in Parliament beyond their normal six-year term; the Sixth Amendment to the Constitution of Sri Lanka required them to swear an oath unconditionally renouncing support for a separate state; and the Black July riots in which up to 3,000 Tamils were murdered by Sinhalese mobs. After three months of absence, Alalasundaram forfeited his seat in Parliament on 5 January 1984.

M. Alalasundaram was murdered on 2 September 1985.
