= Nallur Electoral District =

Former electoral district of Sri Lanka

Nallur Electoral District was an electoral district of Sri Lanka between March 1960 and February 1989. The district was named after the town of Nallur in Jaffna District, Northern Province. The district was carved out of the eastern part of Jaffna Electoral District in March 1960. The 1978 Constitution of Sri Lanka introduced the proportional representation electoral system for electing members of Parliament. The existing 160 mainly single-member electoral districts were replaced with 22 multi-member electoral districts. Nallur electoral district was replaced by the Jaffna multi-member electoral district at the 1989 general elections, the first under the PR system, though Nallur continues to be a polling division of the multi-member electoral district.

== Members of Parliament ==
Key

ITAK ACTC TULF

Election	Member	Party	Term
1960 (March)	E. M. V. Naganathan	Illankai Tamil Arasu Kachchi	1960-1960
1960 (July)	E. M. V. Naganathan	Illankai Tamil Arasu Kachchi	1960-1965
1965	E. M. V. Naganathan	Illankai Tamil Arasu Kachchi	1965-1970
1970	C. Arulampalam	All Ceylon Tamil Congress	1970-1977
1977	M. Sivasithamparam	Tamil United Liberation Front	1977-1989

== Elections ==
=== 1960 (March) Parliamentary General Election ===
Results of the 4th parliamentary election held on 19 March 1960:

Candidate	Party	Symbol	Votes	%
E. M. V. Naganathan	Illankai Tamil Arasu Kachchi	House	9,651	49.24%
C. Arulampalam	All Ceylon Tamil Congress	Bicycle	6,808	34.73%
A. Thurairajasingam	Lanka Sama Samaja Party	Key	1,870	9.54%
M. Karthigesan	Communist Party	Star	757	3.86%
Chelvarayan Manmatharayan		Sun	291	1.48%
Sinnappu Sinnadurai		Ladder	224	1.14%
Valid Votes			19,601	100.00%
Rejected Votes			166	
Total Polled			19,767	
Registered Electors			26,966	
Turnout			73.30%	

=== 1960 (July) Parliamentary General Election ===
Results of the 5th parliamentary election held on 20 July 1960:

Candidate	Party	Symbol	Votes	%
E. M. V. Naganathan	Illankai Tamil Arasu Kachchi	House	11,728	65.44%
C. Arulampalam	All Ceylon Tamil Congress	Chair	6,195	34.56%
Valid Votes			17,923	100.00%
Rejected Votes			142	
Total Polled			18,065	
Registered Electors			26,966	
Turnout			66.99%	

=== 1965 Parliamentary General Election ===
Results of the 6th parliamentary election held on 22 March 1965:

Candidate	Party	Symbol	Votes	%
E. M. V. Naganathan	Illankai Tamil Arasu Kachchi	House	10,301	45.04%
C. Arulampalam	All Ceylon Tamil Congress	Bicycle	9,860	43.11%
Arulambalam Visuvanathan	Lanka Sama Samaja Party	Key	2,709	11.85%
Valid Votes			22,870	100.00%
Rejected Votes			86	
Total Polled			22,956	
Registered Electors			31,864	
Turnout			72.04%	

=== 1970 Parliamentary General Election ===
Results of the 7th parliamentary election held on 27 May 1970:

Candidate	Party	Symbol	Votes	%
C. Arulampalam	All Ceylon Tamil Congress	Bicycle	13,116	46.78%
E. M. V. Naganathan	Illankai Tamil Arasu Kachchi	House	12,508	44.61%
A. Ratnam		Pair of Scales	1,593	5.68%
V. Satchithanandam	Lanka Sama Samaja Party	Key	484	1.73%
C. Thanabalasingham		Cockerel	223	0.80%
S. Srinivasan	Independent	Umbrella	114	0.41%
Valid Votes			28,038	100.00%
Rejected Votes			92	
Total Polled			28,130	
Registered Electors			35,747	
Turnout			78.69%	

C. Arulampalam defected to the Sri Lanka Freedom Party.

=== 1977 Parliamentary General Election ===
Results of the 8th parliamentary election held on 21 July 1977:

Candidate	Party	Symbol	Votes	%
M. Sivasithamparam	Tamil United Liberation Front	Sun	29,858	89.42%
K. Ramanathan	Independent	Omnibus	1,721	5.15%
C. Arulampalam	Sri Lanka Freedom Party	Hand	1,042	3.12%
Rajah Rajeswaram Thangarajah	Independent	Pair of Scales	667	2.00%
Sivakolunthu Subramaniuam	Independent	Umbrella	104	0.31%
Valid Votes			33,392	100.00%
Rejected Votes			137	
Total Polled			33,529	
Registered Electors			40,205	
Turnout			83.40%	

M. Sivasithamparam and all other TULF MPs boycotted Parliament from the middle of 1983 for a number of reasons: they were under pressure from Sri Lankan Tamil militants not to stay in Parliament beyond their normal six-year term; the Sixth Amendment to the Constitution of Sri Lanka required them to swear an oath unconditionally renouncing support for a separate state; and the Black July riots in which up to 3,000 Tamils were murdered by Sinhalese mobs. After three months of absence, Sivasithamparam forfeited his seat in Parliament on 22 October 1983.
