= 51 Division (Sri Lanka) =

- Active: 24 August 1995 – present
- Country: Sri Lanka
- Branch: Sri Lanka Army
- Part of: Security Forces Headquarters – Jaffna
- Garrison/HQ: Kopay Army Base, Northern Province

The 51 Division is a division of the Sri Lanka Army. Established on 24 August 1995, the division is currently based in Kopay in the Northern Province. The division is a part of Security Forces Headquarters – Jaffna.
