= C. Arulampalam =

Sri Lankan Tamil politician and Member of Parliament

Hon. C. Arulampalam MP
- சி. அருளம்பலம்

Member of the Ceylonese Parliament for Nallur
- In office 1970–1977
- Preceded by: E. M. V. Naganathan
- Succeeded by: M. Sivasithamparam

Deputy Chairman of Committees
- In office 23 July 1976 – 18 May 1977
- Preceded by: Senapala Samarasekera
- Succeeded by: C. R. Beligammana

Personal details
- Born: 18 February 1909
- Died: 15 March 1997 (aged 88) Solano County, California, USA
- Party: Sri Lanka Freedom Party
- Ethnicity: Sri Lankan Tamil

Chinnaiah Arulampalam (Tamil: சின்னையா அருளம்பலம்; 18 February 1909 – 5 March 1997) was a Sri Lankan Tamil politician and Member of Parliament.

== Early life ==
Arulampalam was born on 18 February 1909.

== Career ==
Arulampalam stood as the All Ceylon Tamil Congress' candidate in Kopay at the 1952 and as an Independent candidate 1956 parliamentary elections but was defeated by the Illankai Tamil Arasu Kachchi (Federal Party) candidate C. Vanniasingam on both occasions.

Arulampalam was the ACTC candidate in Nallur at the March 1960, July 1960 and 1965 parliamentary elections but was defeated by the ITAK candidate E. M. V. Naganathan both times. He eventually entered Parliament by winning the 1970 parliamentary election. He later defected to the governing Sri Lanka Freedom Party (SLFP) and voted for the new republican constitution. He was labelled a traitor by Tamil militants and Tamil nationalists. The SLFP government rewarded Arulampalam by making him Deputy Chairman of Committees in 1976.

Arulampalam contested the 1977 parliamentary election as the SLFP candidate in Nallur but was resoundingly defeated by the Tamil United Liberation Front candidate M. Sivasithamparam.

Arulampalam died on 5 March 1997 in Solano County, California, USA.
