= M. B. Bambarapane =

Ceylonese politician

Hon. M. B. Bambarapane

Member of Parliament for Welimada
- In office 1952–1956
- Preceded by: K. D. Sugathadasa
- Succeeded by: K. M. P. Rajaratne

Personal details
- Born: Mutu Banda Bambarapane
- Party: United National Party

Mutu Banda Bambarapane was a Ceylonese politician.

At the 2nd parliamentary election, held between 24 May 1952 and 30 May 1952, Bambarapane ran as an independent candidate in the Welimada electorate. He won the seat, polling 6,314 votes (41% of the total vote) defeating candidates from the United National Party, Sri Lanka Freedom Party and Lanka Sama Samaja Party. He was unable to retain the seat at the subsequent 3rd parliamentary election, held between 5 April 1956 and 10 April 1956, where he ran as the United National Party candidate but was defeated by K. M. P. Rajaratne, 12,336 votes to 4,318 votes.

Bambarapane contested the 4th parliamentary election, held on 19 March 1960, however as the United National Party candidate in the newly created Uva Paranagama electorate. He was unsuccessful, losing to Kusuma Rajaratne, the wife of K. M. P. Rajaratne, with Bambarapane receiving 2,695 votes to Rajaratne's 4,662 votes. Whilst he did not contest the July 1960 parliamentary elections he did run in the 6th parliamentary election, held on 22 March 1965, but this time as an independent, losing to the sitting member, Kusuma Rajaratne, by 1,951 votes.
