= M. Balasundaram =

Ceylon Tamil lawyer, politician and Member of Parliament

Hon. M. Balasundaram MP
- மு. பாலசுந்தரம்
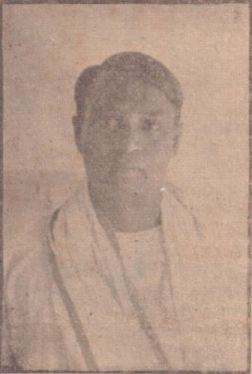

Member of the Ceylonese Parliament for Kopay
- In office 1960–1965
- Preceded by: C. Vanniasingam
- Succeeded by: S. Kathiravelupillai

Personal details
- Born: 7 April 1903
- Died: 15 December 1965 (aged 62)
- Education: Ceylon University College; Trinity Hall, Cambridge
- Profession: Lawyer
- Ethnicity: Ceylon Tamil

Murugesu Balasundaram (Tamil: முருகேசு பாலசுந்தரம்; 7 April 1903 – 15 December 1965) was a Ceylon Tamil lawyer, politician and Member of Parliament.

== Early life and family ==
Balasundaram was born on 7 April 1903. He was the son of Reverend K. S. Murugesu, a Methodist clergyman. He was educated at Kilner College, Jaffna and Royal College, Colombo. After school Balasundaram joined the Ceylon University College, graduating in 1923 with a B.Sc. degree. He received a scholarship to study at Trinity Hall, Cambridge from where he graduated with a B.A. degree.

Balasundaram married Sinnammah, daughter of Sinnathamby. They had four sons (Gnanasanmugan, Yogasundaram, Balakrishnan and Sivanandasundaram) and two daughters (Somasundaravalli and Yogeswari).

== Career ==
After returning to Ceylon Balasundaram worked as journalist for a brief period before joining the legal profession as an advocate.

Balasundaram was one of the founding members of the Jaffna Youth Congress in 1924. He stood as the Illankai Tamil Arasu Kachchi's (Federal Party) candidate in Kopay at the March 1960 parliamentary election. He won the election and entered Parliament. He was re-elected at the July 1960 parliamentary election. He stood as an independent candidate in Kopay at 1965 parliamentary election but was defeated by the ITAK candidate S. Kathiravelupillai.

Balasundaram died on 15 December 1965.
