= S. Kathiravelupillai =

Sri Lankan Tamil lawyer, politician and Member of Parliament

Hon. S. Kathiravelupillai MP
- சி. கதிரவேலுப்பிள்ளை

Member of the Ceylonese Parliament for Kopay
- In office 1965–1981
- Preceded by: M. Balasundaram
- Succeeded by: M. Alalasundaram

Personal details
- Born: 24 October 1924
- Died: 31 March 1981 (aged 56) Madras, India
- Party: Illankai Tamil Arasu Kachchi
- Other political affiliations: Tamil United Liberation Front
- Education: University of Ceylon
- Profession: Lawyer
- Ethnicity: Sri Lankan Tamil

Sivasubramaniam Kathiravelupillai (Tamil: சிவசுப்பிரமணியம் கதிரவேலுப்பிள்ளை; 24 October 1924 – 31 March 1981) was a Sri Lankan Tamil lawyer, politician and Member of Parliament.

== Early life and family ==
Kathiravelupillai was the son of Sivasubramaniam, a proctor from Irupalai in northern Ceylon. After school he entered the University of Ceylon to study a degree in philosophy and studied law later.

== Career ==
After qualifying as an Attorney-at-Law, Kathiravelupillai practised civil law.

Kathiravelupillai stood as the Illankai Tamil Arasu Kachchi's (Federal Party) candidate in Jaffna at the March 1960 and July 1960 parliamentary elections but on each occasion was defeated by independent candidate Alfred Duraiappah. He stood as the ITAK candidate in Kopay at the 1965 parliamentary election. He won the election and entered Parliament. Kathiravelupillai played a leading role in the 1961 satyagraha campaign organised by ITAK. He was re-elected at the 1970 parliamentary election.

On 14 May 1972 the ITAK, All Ceylon Tamil Congress, Ceylon Workers' Congress, Eelath Thamilar Otrumai Munnani and All Ceylon Tamil Conference formed the Tamil United Front, later renamed Tamil United Liberation Front (TULF). In 1973 Kathiravelupillai published a pamphlet titled A Statement on Eelam: Co-Existence – Not Confrontation, considered one of the most important documents in the Tamil independence movement, which articulated the reasons why the two nations - Tamils and Sinhalese - needed to co-exist on the island of Ceylon in separate states. Kathiravelupillai was the TULF's candidate in Kopay at the 1977 parliamentary election and was re-elected.

Kathiravelupillai died on 31 March 1981 in Madras, India.

== Works ==
- Glimpses of Western Philosophy
- Rubaiyat of Omar Khayam (1961, translation)
- A Statement on Eelam: Co-Existence – Not Confrontation (1973)
