= Kusuma Rajaratne =

Ceylonese politician

Kusuma Rajaratne (née Perera) (12 December 1925 - May 2007) was a Ceylonese politician.

Kusuma Perera was born on 12 December 1925 in Kotte the second of four children to Awis Perera, an Ayurvedic physician and Caroline Hamine. Kusuma received her education at Ananda Sastralaya and Anula Vidyalaya before entered the University of Colombo. On 24 August 1950 she married Konara Mudiyanselage Podiappuhamy Rajaratne, a teacher and lecturer, whom she had known since her school days at Ananda Sastralaya.

Her husband stood as a candidate for Welimada at the 1952 parliamentary election but failed to get elected after coming third. On 26 August 1955 the district court in Badulla convicted Rajaratne, who had been his own election agent at the 1952 parliamentary election, of not submitting his election expenses and fined him Rs. 100. He stood as the Mahajana Eksath Peramuna (MEP) candidate for Welimada at the 1956 parliamentary election, winning the election. On 1 October 1956 an election judge ruled that the 1956 parliamentary election in Welimada was void because Rajaratne had been disqualified from being a Member of Parliament for three years following his 1955 conviction. As a result, he lost his seat in Parliament.

In the subsequent by-election held on 7 September 1957 Kusuma ran as an independent, where she secured 14,069 votes, just over 80% of the total vote, defeating both the National Liberation Front (NLF) and Sri Lanka Freedom Party candidates, who combined only received under 19% of the total vote.

At the 4th parliamentary election in March 1960 she stood down from representing Welidama allowing her husband to re-contest the seat. Kusuma however ran in the newly created adjoining seat of Uva Paranagama, as the National Liberation Front (Jathika Vimukthi Peramuna) candidate, which she won, receiving 4,662 votes (40% of the total votes). She retained the seat at the subsequent parliamentary elections in July 1960, with an increased majority, receiving 6,473 votes (56.88% of the total votes).

Kusuma also successfully contested the 1965 parliamentary elections, where she was the sole parliamentary representative of National Liberation Front, her husband failing in his attempt to be re-elected for the seat of Welimada. Kusama was appointed as the Parliamentary Secretary for the Minister of Home Affairs in the Third Dudley Senanayake cabinet but resigned the post in 1966 in protest against the Government's decision to introduce new laws to facilitate the official use of Tamil in administration.
