= J. G. Gunasekera =

Sri Lankan politician

Jayalathge Gnanasekera Gunasekera (16 January 1925 - 19??) was a Sri Lankan politician. He was the member of Parliament of Sri Lanka from Bandarawela representing the Sri Lanka Freedom Party.

He was elected to parliament from Bandarawela in the March 1960 general election and was re-elected from July 1960 general election and in the 1965 general election. He lost his seat in 1966. He contest the 1970 general election as an independent and polled third.
