= R. M. Appuhamy =

Ceylonese politician

Ratnayake Mudiyanselage Appuhamy (born 9 January 1930) was a Ceylonese politician. He was the member of Parliament of Sri Lanka from Bandarawela representing the Sri Lanka Freedom Party. He was defeated in the 1977 general election.
