= K. D. Sugathadasa =

Ceylonese politician

Hon. Kumara Vidanelage Don Sugathadasa

Member of the Ceylon Parliament for Welimada
- In office 1947–1952
- Preceded by: seat created
- Succeeded by: M. B. Bambarapane

Member of the Ceylon Parliament for Bandarawela
- In office 1952–1956
- Preceded by: K. V. Nadarajah
- Succeeded by: Y. G. Jayasinghe

Personal details
- Born: 8 July 1908
- Party: Independent, United National Party, Lanka Prajathanthravadi Pakshaya
- Profession: politician

Kumara Vidanelage Don Sugathadasa (8 July 1908 – March 1972) was a Ceylonese politician.

Sugathadasa was elected as an independent member at the 1st parliamentary election, held between 23 August 1947 and 20 September 1947, in the Welimada electorate, receiving 4,242 votes (40.86% of the total vote) narrowly defeating his nearest rival, A. G. Divitotawela, by 22 votes. Sugathadasa's victory was assured by estate workers who voted en-bloc against the United National Party.

Rather than re-contest the seat at the 2nd parliamentary election, this time Sugathadasa ran in the Bandarawela electorate, as the United National Party candidate, securing 6,392 votes, (a 62% majority) and 4,126 votes clear of his nearest rival.

Sugathadasa then ran for election at the 3rd parliamentary election, held between 5 April 1956 and 10 April 1956, in the multi-member seat of Badulla, where he ran last in a field of four, only securing 1,301 votes (2.88% of the total vote).

At the 5th parliamentary election, held on 20 July 1960, Sugathadasa contested the newly created Soranatota electorate as the Lanka Prajathanthravadi Pakshaya candidate. He failed in his attempt, losing to the UNP candidate, S. B. Ekanayake, who received 4,539 votes and the SLFP candidate, K. Y. M. Wijeratne Banda, who received 4,330 votes, as opposed to Sugathadasa's 1,017 votes. He re-contested the seat at the subsequent 6th parliamentary election, held on 22 March 1965, where he only secured 903 votes, as opposed to the successful SLFP candidate, K. Y. M. Wijeratne Banda, who polled 6,901 votes and the UNP candidate, S. B. Ekanayake, who polled 6,023 votes.
