= Jathika Vimukthi Peramuna =

National Liberation Front ජාතික විමුක්ති පෙරමුණ
- Abbreviation: JVP/NLF
- Founder: K. M. P. Rajaratne
- Founded: 1957
- Ideology: Sinhalese Buddhist nationalism Anti-communism
- Political position: Far-right

Jathika Vimukthi Peramuna (JVP; National Liberation Front) was a far-right political party in Sri Lanka formed in 1957 by K. M. P. Rajaratne and his wife Kusuma Rajaratne. The JVP received support from local businesses, and anti-Tamil riots were extreme in villages in which it was active.

== History ==
Following the 1958 anti-Tamil pogrom, the government of Ceylon banned the Ilankai Tamil Arasu Kachchi and the JVP. The bans lasted for several months.

Once the bans ended, the JVP contested in democratic elections, and joined the United National Party-led coalition government in 1965. The UNP promised positions to several political parties that were opposed to Marxism. Kusuma Rajaratne was appointed as the Parliamentary Secretary for the Minister of Home Affairs in the Third Dudley Senanayake cabinet, but resigned from the post in 1966 in protest against the Government's decision to introduce new laws to facilitate the official use of Tamil in administration.

== Electoral history ==
Sri Lanka Parliamentary Elections
Election year	Votes	Vote %	Seats won	+/–	Government
1960 March	11,201	0.37%	2 / 151	▲2	Opposition
1960 July	14,030	0.46%	2 / 151	Steady	Opposition
1965	18,791	0.46%	1 / 151	▼1	Coalition (1965–1966)
1965	18,791	0.46%	1 / 151	▼1	Opposition (1966–1970)
