= K. V. Nadarajah =

Ceylon Tamil lawyer and Member of Parliament

Hon. Kanthapillai Velupillai Nadarajah

Member of the Ceylon Parliament for Bandarawela
- In office 1947–1952
- Preceded by: seat created
- Succeeded by: K. D. Sugathadasa

Personal details
- Born: 6 July 1905
- Died: October 2000
- Party: Independent politician
- Spouse: Gnanamany née Eliyatamby
- Children: Bala (son)
- Education: Jaffna Central College; Parameshwara College; Ceylon University College
- Profession: lawyer, politician
- Ethnicity: Ceylon Tamil

Kanthapillai Velupillai Nadarajah (6 July 1905 – October 2000) was a leading Ceylon Tamil lawyer and Member of Parliament.

== Early life and family ==
Nadarajah was born on 6 July 1905. He was one of the four sons of Kalladi Velupillai (Kalladi Velan), a prominent poet, and Atchikuddy. Nadarajah was educated at Jaffna Central College and Parameshwara College, Jaffna. After school he joined Ceylon University College. He then entered Colombo Law College, qualifying as a proctor.

Nadarajah married Gnanamani, daughter of P. S. Eliyatamby. They had a son (Bala).

== Career ==
Nadarajah started practising law in Badulla in 1930. He continued practising in Uva Province for 54 years.

Nadarajah was a member of Badulla Urban Council for more than ten years. He contested the 1947 parliamentary election as an independent candidate in Bandarawela and was elected to Parliament.

Nadarajah was president of the Badulla Saiva Paripalana Sangam and managing trustee of the Kathir-velauthar Swami Temple in Badulla. He was the founder of first Tamil school in Uva and served as the manager of Badualla Saraswathi Minor and Maha Vidayalam for 30 years.

== Later life ==
Nadarajah's family home in Pingarawa was burnt to the ground during the Black July anti-Tamil riots of 1983. Nadarajah fled to Colombo with assistance of J. C. T. Kotelawala, the former MP for Badulla.
