= Kopay Army Base =

Military base in Kopay, Sri Lanka

- Kopay in Sri Lanka

Site information
- Type: Military base
- Owner: Ministry of Defence and Urban Development
- Operator: Sri Lanka Army
- Controlled by: Security Forces Headquarters – Jaffna
- Open to the public: No

Location
- Location within Northern Province
- Coordinates: 09°42′23.30″N 80°02′56.10″E

Garrison information
- Garrison: 51 Division

Kopay Army Base is a military base in Kopay, Sri Lanka. The base was built on a Liberation Tigers of Tamil Eelam war cemetery.

== History ==
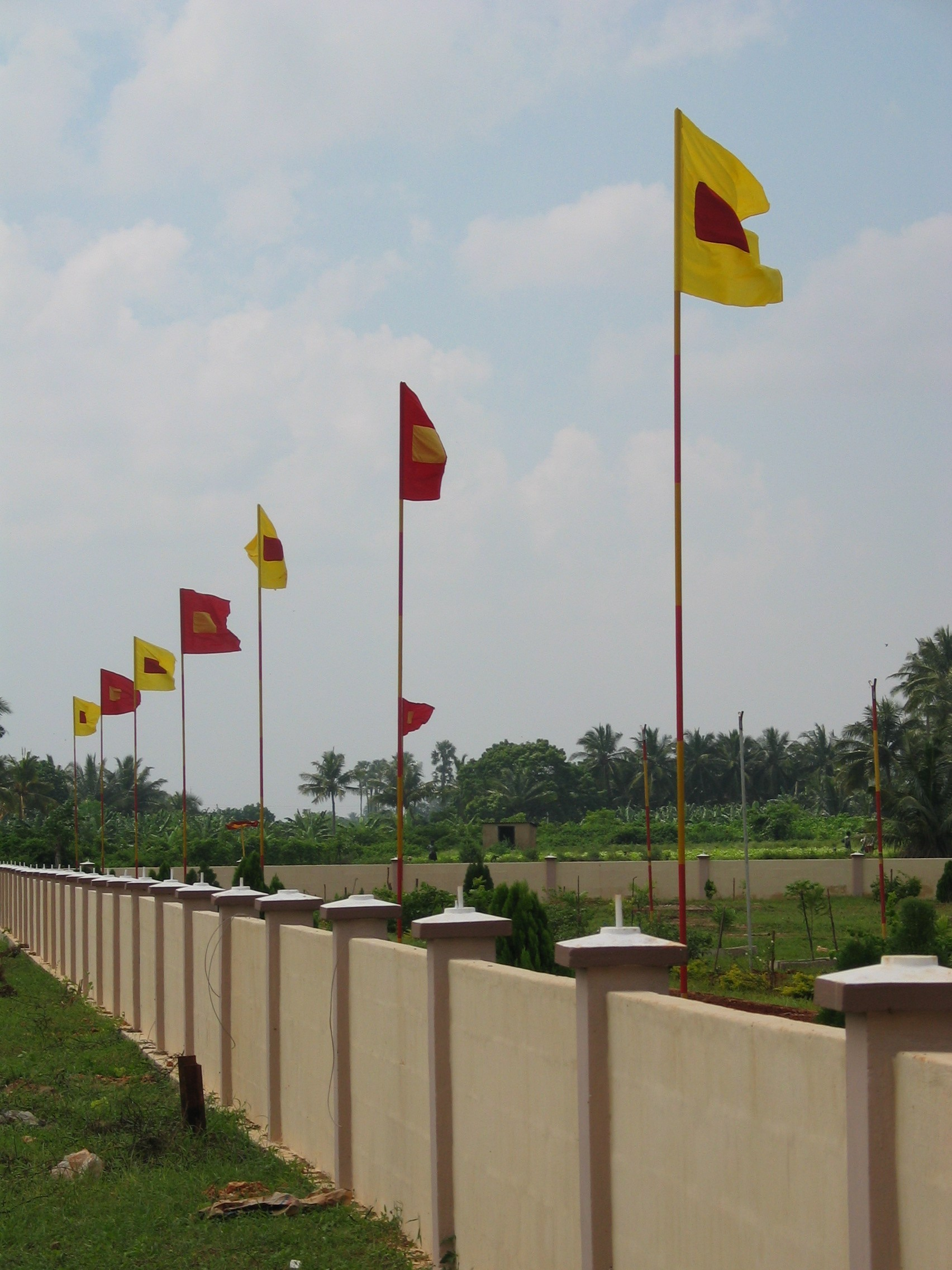
Kopay war cemetery in 2004

In the early 1990s, when the rebel Liberation Tigers of Tamil Eelam (LTTE) controlled the Valikamam region of Jaffna Peninsula, they built a thuyilum illam (resting place) for their maaveerar (great heroes) in Kopay. After the Sri Lankan military recaptured Valikamam in 1995 they destroyed the LTTE cemetery using tractors. After the Norwegian mediated peace process began in 2002 the LTTE started rebuilding their war cemeteries including that at Kopay. After the Sri Lankan Civil War ended in May 2009 with military defeat of the LTTE the Sri Lankan government/military re-commenced destroying LTTE war cemeteries and other memorials for dead LTTE members. In July 2010 the Sri Lankan military destroyed Kopay war cemetery. The cemetery had had 2,000 graves.

The Sri Lankan military then started building an army base on the site of the cemetery. On 4 March 2011 the new headquarters of the Sri Lanka Army's 51 Division was officially opened by Jagath Jayasuriya, Commander of the Army.
