= M. Alalasundaram =

20th-century Sri Lankan Tamil teacher and politician

Hon. M. Alalasundaram MP
- மு. ஆலாலசுந்தரம்

Member of Parliament for Kopay
- In office 1981–1984
- Preceded by: S. Kathiravelupillai

Personal details
- Died: 2 September 1985 Kalliyankadu, Nallur, Sri Lanka
- Party: Illankai Tamil Arasu Kachchi
- Other political affiliations: Tamil United Liberation Front
- Profession: Teacher
- Ethnicity: Sri Lankan Tamil

Arumugam Murugesu Alalasundaram (Tamil: முருகேசு ஆலாலசுந்தரம்; died in 1985) was an assassinated Sri Lankan Tamil teacher, politician and Member of Parliament.

== Early life ==
Alalasundaram was from Nayanmarkaddu near Nallur in northern Ceylon. He studied in Madras and after graduation became a teacher.

== Career ==
Alalasundaram stood as the Illankai Tamil Arasu Kachchi's (Federal Party) candidate in Kilinochchi at the 1970 parliamentary election but was defeated by the All Ceylon Tamil Congress (ACTC) candidate V. Anandasangaree.

On 14 May 1972 the ITAK, ACTC, Ceylon Workers' Congress, Eelath Thamilar Otrumai Munnani and All Ceylon Tamil Conference formed the Tamil United Front, later renamed Tamil United Liberation Front (TULF).

In March 1981 S. Kathiravelupillai, the TULF MP for Kopay, died and Alalasundaram was nominated by the TULF as his replacement. Alalasundaram entered Parliament after being sworn in on 23 July 1981. Alalasundaram and all other TULF MPs boycotted Parliament from the middle of 1983 for a number of reasons: they were under pressure from Sri Lankan Tamil militants not to stay in Parliament beyond their normal six-year term; the Sixth Amendment to the Constitution of Sri Lanka required them to swear an oath unconditionally renouncing support for a separate state; and the Black July riots in which up to 3,000 Tamils were murdered by Sinhalese mobs. After three months of absence, Alalasundaram forfeited his seat in Parliament on 5 January 1984.

Many leading Tamil politicians fled to Madras but Alalasundaram was one of the few who remained in Sri Lanka. He stayed at his house near Nallur documenting the growing violence. On 22 February 1983 Alalasundaram was shot and injured after a heated argument with three or four pro-LTTE youths at his house.

=== Assassination ===
On 1 September 1985 two men abducted Alalasundaram at gunpoint from his house at Kalliyankadu, Nallur. They took Alalasundaram in a car and drove to Uduvil where V. Dharmalingam, former MP for Manipay, was attending a wedding. The men then kidnapped Dharmalingam as well. The next day Alalasundaram's body was found in a scrub jungle near his home at Kalliyankadu with bullet wounds in the chest and arm. Dharmalingam's body was found at a cemetery in Thavady, Manipay, with a bullet wound in the forehead.

No one claimed responsibility for the assassinations. Dharmalingam's son Siddhartan, who is a member of the People's Liberation Organisation of Tamil Eelam militant group, blamed one of the members of Eelam National Liberation Front for the assassinations (PLOTE wasn't a member of ENLF). It is widely believed that the murders were carried out by Tamil Eelam Liberation Organization (TELO), an Indian backed militant group, on the orders of the Research and Analysis Wing, the Indian intelligence agency. Alalasundaram was close to the TELO and a relative of its leader Sri Sabaratnam. It is believed that TELO chose to murder Alalasundaram at the same time as Dharmalingam so as to avoid suspicion. According to Siddhartan and K. T. Rajasingham, the TELO assassins had been led by Bobby but others claim that it was Das.

However, the Sri Lankan government and Sinhalese Buddhist nationalists have repeatedly blamed the Liberation Tigers of Tamil Eelam (LTTE) for the assassinations. As recently as 2013 the Sri Lankan military was blaming the LTTE for the assassinations.

== See also ==
- List of assassinations of the Sri Lankan Civil War
