= Ravindra Samaraweera =

Sri Lankan politician

Hon. Ravindra Samaraweera MP

Minister of Labour and Trade Union Relations
- In office 1 May 2018 – 26 November 2019
- President: Maithripala Sirisena
- Prime Minister: Ranil Wickremesinghe
- Preceded by: John Seneviratne

Minister of Wildlife and Sustainable Development
- In office 25 February 2018 – 1 May 2018
- President: Maithripala Sirisena
- Prime Minister: Ranil Wickremesinghe
- Preceded by: Gamini Jayawickrama Perera
- Succeeded by: Sarath Fonseka

State Minister of Labour and Trade Union Relations
- In office 9 September 2015 – 25 February 2018
- President: Maithripala Sirisena
- Prime Minister: Ranil Wickremesinghe

Project Minister of Social Welfare
- In office 2001–2004
- President: Chandrika Kumaratunge
- Prime Minister: Ranil Wickremesinghe

Member of Parliament for Badulla District
- Incumbent
- Assumed office 2015
- In office 1989–2010

Minister of State for Food and co-operatives
- In office 18 February 1989 – 1 May 1993
- President: Ranasinghe Premadasa
- Prime Minister: Dingiri Banda Wijetunga

Personal details
- Party: United National Party
- Other political affiliations: United National Front
- Spouse: Sita Samaraweera
- Relations: Percy Samaraweera
- Children: Shanil
- Education: St. Thomas' College Guruthalawa
- Occupation: Planter
- Profession: Politician

Ravindra Samaraweera (or Ravi Samaraweera) is a Sri Lankan politician, the current Cabinet Minister of Labour and Trade Union Relations and former cabinet minister of Wildlife and Sustainable Development and former state minister of Labor and Trade Union Relations member of the Parliament of Sri Lanka.

Born to a leading political family in the Uva province Samaraweera is a long time United National Party organizer of the Walimada seat and leader of the Badulla District. He was a Deputy Minister in the Ranasinghe Premadasa Cabinet and later a Project minister in the 2001 Ranil Wickramasinghe Government. In 2015 Samaraweera was appointed as minister in the Uva Provincial Council Under Harin Fernando. Samaraweera was also appointed the acting Chief Minister of Uva Province few times in the year 2015 while serving as the minister in the council. In 2018 he was given the cabinet Minister of Wildlife and Sustainable Development.

Samaraweera who was a member of parliament from 1989 to 2010 was re-elected to Parliament in 2015 after his party United National Party won the election to form a government.

== Personal life ==
Samaraweera is the nephew of Percy Samaraweera former Chief Minister of Uva Province. He is married to Sita Samaraweera and they have five children.
