= Uva Paranagama Electoral District =

Electoral district of Sri Lanka

Uva Paranagama electoral district was an electoral district of Sri Lanka between March 1960 and February 1989. The district was named after the town of Uva Paranagama in Badulla District, Uva Province. The 1978 Constitution of Sri Lanka introduced the proportional representation electoral system for electing members of Parliament. The existing 160 mainly single-member electoral districts were replaced with 22 multi-member electoral districts. Uva Paranagama electoral district was replaced by the Badulla multi-member electoral district at the 1989 general elections.

== Members of Parliament ==
Key

Independent SLFP UNP

Election	Member	Party	Term
1960 (March)	Kusuma Rajaratne	NLF	1960
1960 (July)	Kusuma Rajaratne	NLF	1960-1965
1965	Kusuma Rajaratne	NLF	1965-1970
1970	S. B. Delungahawatta	SLFP	1970-1977
1977	R. M. Karunaratne	UNP	1977-1989

== Elections ==
=== 1960 (March) Parliamentary General Election ===
Results of the 4th parliamentary election held on 19 March 1960:

Candidate	Party	Symbol	Votes	%
Kusuma Rajaratne	National Liberation Front	Aeroplane	4,662	40.40
M. B. Bambarapane	United National Party	Elephant	2,695	23.35
S. B. Delungahawatte	Independent	Rooster	1,790	15.51
D. C. Wijesooriya	Independent	Ladder	855	7.41
M. Danister Perera		Sun	440	3.81
E. B. Dimbulane		Rabbit	429	3.72
Henry Dharmasena		Cartwheel	352	3.05
K. V. Don Sugathadasa		Umbrella	209	1.81
Valid Votes			11,432	99.06
Rejected Votes			108	0.94
Total Polled			11,540	100.00
Registered Electors			14,519	
Turnout				79.48

=== 1960 (July) Parliamentary General Election ===
Results of the 5th parliamentary election held on 20 July 1960:

Candidate	Party	Symbol	Votes	%
Kusuma Rajaratne	National Liberation Front	Aeroplane	6,473	56.88
S. B. Delungahawatta	United National Party	Elephant	4,830	42.44
Valid Votes			11,303	99.32
Rejected Votes			78	0.68
Total Polled			11,381	100.00
Registered Electors			14,519	
Turnout				78.39

=== 1965 Parliamentary General Election ===
Results of the 6th parliamentary election held on 22 March 1965:

Candidate	Party	Symbol	Votes	%
Kusuma Rajaratne	National Liberation Front	Aeroplane	6,839	44.26
M. B. Bambarapane	Independent	Lamp	4,888	31.63
S. B. Delungahawatta	Sri Lanka Freedom Party	Hand	3,558	23.02
Valid Votes			15,285	98.91
Rejected Votes			168	1.09
Total Polled			15,453	100.00
Registered Electors			18,630	
Turnout				82.95

=== 1970 Parliamentary General Election ===
Results of the 7th parliamentary election held on 27 May 1970:

Candidate	Party	Symbol	Votes	%
S. B. Delungahawatta	Sri Lanka Freedom Party	Hand	9,245	46.91
R. M. Karunaratne	United National Party	Elephant	7,530	38.20
R. M. G. Samaranayake		Umbrella	2,143	10.87
W. D. Jothiratne		Bell	249	10.87
E. B. Dimbulana		Chair	245	1.24
D. M. Appuhamy		Lamp	210	1.07
Valid Votes			19,622	99.55
Rejected Votes			88	0.45
Total Polled			19,710	100.00
Registered Electors			22,384	
Turnout				88.05

=== 1977 Parliamentary General Election ===
Results of the 8th parliamentary election held on 21 July 1977:

Candidate	Party	Symbol	Votes	%
R. M. Karunaratne	United National Party	Elephant	15,108	62.47
S. B. Delungahawatte	Sri Lanka Freedom Party	Hand	8,134	33.63
Karunapala Ratnayake		Key	260	1.08
Gamini Samaranayake		Umbrella	190	0.79
M. D. Perera		Aeroplane	141	0.58
Tissa Deshapriya Herath		Lamp	130	0.54
Nissanaka Bandaranayake		Cartwheel	45	0.19
Gunapala Badrage		Scales	40	0.17
Valid Votes			24,048	99.43
Rejected Votes			137	0.57
Total Polled			24,185	
Registered Electors			26,908	100.00
Turnout				89.88
