= E. M. V. Naganathan =

Ceylon Tamil physician and politician

Hon. Senator E. M. V. Naganathan
- இ. மு. வி. நாகநாதன்

Member of the Senate of Ceylon

Member of the Ceylonese Parliament for Nallur
- In office 1960–1970
- Succeeded by: C. Arulampalam

Personal details
- Born: 31 January 1906 Madras, India
- Died: 16 August 1971 (aged 65)
- Party: Illankai Tamil Arasu Kachchi
- Education: Madras Medical College
- Profession: Physician
- Ethnicity: Ceylon Tamil

Elangai Murugesu Vijayaretnam Naganathan (Tamil: இலங்கை முருகேசு விஜயரத்தினம் நாகநாதன்; 31 January 1906 – 16 August 1971) was a Ceylon Tamil physician, politician, senator and Member of Parliament.

== Early life and family ==
Naganathan was born on 31 January 1906 in Madras, India. He was the son of John Jebaratnam Hensman, registrar of the University of Madras. The Hensman family were from Ceylon but moved to South India for education and work. Naganathan's father (John Jebaratnam Hensman), grandfather (Charles Hensman) and great-grandfather (Rev. John Hensman) had all been born in Ceylon. After school Naganathan joined Madras Medical College, qualifying as a medical doctor. He then went to the United Kingdom, obtained the MRCP and FRCS qualifications and practised medicine for a period.

Naganathan married Retnavathi, daughter of John Wirt Ponniah Senathirajah from Alaveddy. They had three daughters (Mary Lukshmi, Anne Nirmala and Carmel Indhira) and two sons (Elangai Anthony and John).

== Career ==
After returning to Ceylon Naganathan worked as a private medical practitioner in Colombo.

Naganathan was an active member of the All Ceylon Tamil Congress (ACTC) and served as its secretary in 1947. He was elected to the Senate of Ceylon in 1947. In 1948 division arose amongst ACTC members over the party leadership's decision to join the United National Party (UNP) led government. Naganathan was one of those who opposed joining the UNP government. The dissidents, led by S. J. V. Chelvanayakam, C. Vanniasingam and Naganathan, eventually left the ACTC and formed the Illankai Tamil Arasu Kachchi (Federal Party) in 1949. Naganathan was ITAK's secretary for a period and became the party's president in 1966.

Naganathan stood as the ITAK's candidate in Jaffna at the 1952 and 1956 parliamentary elections but on each occasion was defeated by the ACTC leader G. G. Ponnambalam. Naganathan stood as the ITAK's (Federal Party) candidate in Nallur at the March 1960 parliamentary election. He won the election and entered Parliament. He was re-elected at the July 1960 and 1965 and parliamentary elections but lost out to the ACTC candidate C. Arulampalam at the 1970 parliamentary election.

On 5 June 1956 a group of Tamil activists and parliamentarians, including Naganathan, staged a satyagraha against the Sinhala Only Act on Galle Face Green opposite the Parliament. The satyagrahis were attacked by a Sinhalese mob as the police looked on, and Naganathan and V. N. Navaratnam were thrown in the lake. Following the 1958 riots ITAK and the Jathika Vimukthi Peramuna (National Liberation Front) were banned. ITAK's leaders, including Naganathan, were arrested on 4 June 1958 as they left Parliament and imprisoned.

Naganathan played a leading role in the 1961 satyagraha campaign organised by ITAK. Early on the morning of 20 February 1961 a group of 55 to 75 persons staged a satyagraha at the Jaffna Kachcheri in Old Park. Among them were ITAK MPs A. Amirthalingam, S. J. V. Chelvanayakam, V. Dharmalingam, V. A. Kandiah, Naganathan, V. N. Navaratnam and K. Thurairatnam. A large group of policemen arrived in riot gear, wearing helmets and carrying batons and shields. The police started removing the protesters by lifting and carrying them away. Those who resisted were dragged away. Later, as Government Agent M. Srikantha and Superintendent of Police Richard Arndt tried to leave Old Park in a jeep the protesters blocked their way. The police reacted with brutality, beating the protesters with batons and pulled them out bodily. Palaniyappan, a young man who had thrown himself in front of the jeep was pulled away by the police and beaten severely with batons. Five ITAK MPs were amongst the protesters blocking the jeep. Kandiah was carried out and dumped on the ground, Dharmalingam and Thurairatnam were dragged out by their hands and legs whilst Amirthalingam and Naganathan were baton charged. The police also baton charged a crowd of around 5,000 who had gathered to watch the satyagraha.

Naganathan died on 16 August 1971.
