= C. Vanniasingam =

Ceylon Tamil lawyer, politician and member of parliament

Hon. C. Vanniasingam MP
- கு. வன்னியசிங்கம்

Member of the Ceylonese Parliament for Kopay
- In office 1947–1959
- Succeeded by: M. Balasundaram

President of the Illankai Tamil Arasu Kachchi
- Preceded by: S. J. V. Chelvanayakam
- Succeeded by: N. R. Rajavarothiam

Personal details
- Born: 12 October 1911
- Died: 17 September 1959 (aged 47)
- Party: Illankai Tamil Arasu Kachchi
- Education: Ceylon University College
- Profession: Lawyer
- Ethnicity: Ceylon Tamil

Coomaraswamy Vanniasingam (Tamil: குமாரசாமி வன்னியசிங்கம்; 12 October 1911 – 17 September 1959) was a Ceylon Tamil lawyer, politician and member of parliament.

== Early life and family ==
Vanniasingam was born on 12 October 1911. He was the son of V. Coomaraswamy, a proctor and Tamil scholar from Tellippalai in northern Ceylon. Vanniasingam's brother was C. Balasingam, the Deputy Secretary to the Treasury. Vanniasingam was educated at Mahajana College, Tellippalai and Jaffna Hindu College. After school Vanniasingam joined the Ceylon University College, graduating in 1933 with a B.A. degree.

Vanniasingam married Komathy, a daughter of the physician Srinivasan. They had five daughters: Hemavathi, Sathiyavathi, Renukathevi, Bahirathy and Ranjini.

== Political career ==
Vanniasingam joined the legal profession as an advocate and practised law in Jaffna.

P. G. Thambyappah, the All Ceylon Tamil Congress's (ACTC) candidate in Kopay at the 1947 parliamentary election, died during the election campaign. Vanniasingam was chosen to replace Thambyappah. He won the election and entered Parliament.

In 1948 division arose amongst ACTC members over the party leadership's decision to join the United National Party (UNP) led government. Vanniasingam was one of those who opposed joining the UNP government. The dissidents, led by S. J. V. Chelvanayakam, E. M. V. Naganathan and Vanniasingam, eventually left the ACTC and formed the Illankai Tamil Arasu Kachchi (Federal Party) in 1949. Vanniasingam served as president of ITAK.

Vanniasingam stood as the ITAK candidate in Kopay at the 1952 parliamentary election and was re-elected. Vanniasingam was one of only two ITAK MPs elected and, with ITAK leader Chelvanayakam out of Parliament, Vanniasingam functioned as the parliamentary leader of the party. He was re-elected at the 1956 parliamentary election. Following the 1958 riots, ITAK and the Jathika Vimukthi Peramuna (National Liberation Front) were banned. ITAK's leaders, including Vanniasingam, were arrested on 4 June 1958 as they left Parliament and imprisoned.

Vanniasingam died on 17 September 1959.
