= Percy Samaraweera =

Sri Lankan politician

Hon. Hon. Percy Samaraweera

Member of Parliament for Welimada
- In office 1965–1970
- In office 1977–1987

Chief Minister of Uva Province
- In office 16 September 1988 – 6 June 1998
- Preceded by: position created
- Succeeded by: Nalini Weerawanni

Personal details
- Born: Polwatte Samaraweera Aratchilage Percy Samaraweera; 18 March 1923
- Died: 23 March 1999 (aged 76)
- Party: United National Party
- Spouse: Manel née Kuruppu
- Children: Kalinga, Anusha, Kumeshi, Nihal
- Education: St John's College Panadura, St Sylvester's College, Kandy
- Profession: Politician
- Website: https://www.facebook.com/Psamaraweera

Polwatte Samaraweera Aratchilage Percy Samaraweera (18 March 1923 - 23 March 1999) was a Sri Lankan politician who belonged to the United National Party. He was educated at St John's College Panadura and St Sylvester's College, Kandy. He was the first Chief Minister of Uva Province in Sri Lanka from 16 September 1988 to 6 June 1998 after which the council was dissolved and elections were held only in 1999. He was elected to the Sri Lankan Parliament in 1965 and 1977 from Welimada electorate.
