= July 1960 Ceylonese parliamentary election =

- 20 July 1960

151 seats in the House of Representatives of Ceylon 76 seats were needed for a majority
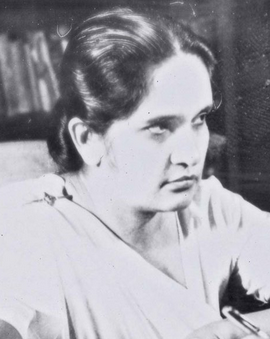

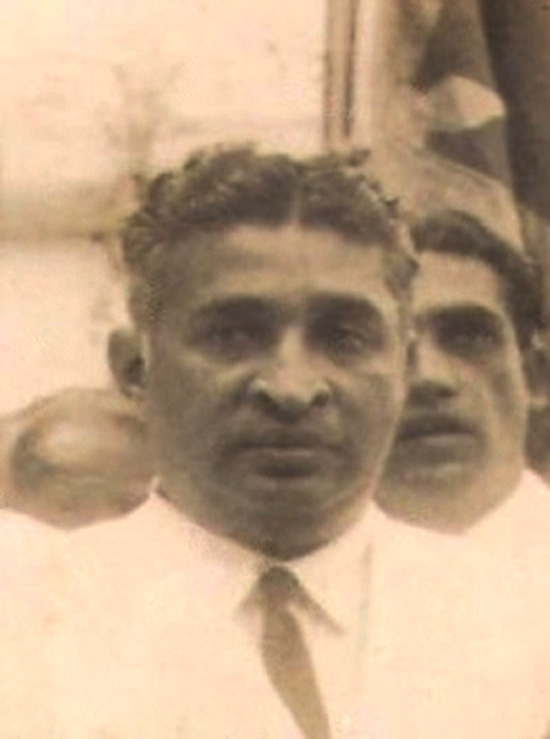
	First party	Second party
Leader	Sirimavo Bandaranaike	Dudley Senanayake
Party	SLFP	UNP
Leader since	1960	1957
Leader's seat	n/a	Dedigama
Last election	21.28%, 46 seats	29.89%, 50 seats
Seats won	75	30
Seat change	▲29	▼20
Popular vote	1,022,171	1,144,166
Percentage	33.22%	37.19%
Swing	▲11.94pp	▲7.30pp
Prime Minister before election
Dudley Senanayake
UNP
Prime Minister-designate
Sirimavo Bandaranaike
SLFP

Snap parliamentary elections were held in Ceylon in July 1960.

== Background ==
The March 1960 election had left neither of Ceylon's two major parties with a majority, so another election was inevitable.

The Sri Lanka Freedom Party, which had been in disarray since the murder of its leader S.W.R.D. Bandaranaike the previous year, settled on his widow, Sirimavo, as its new leader. She pledged to continue her husband's policies, notably the Sinhala Only Act, and to proceed with repatriation of the estate Tamils to India. However, she promised to reach a compromise with the Federal Party.

The United National Party, led by Dudley Senanayake, refused to compromise with the Federal Party. It also differed with the SLFP over economic policy. The SLFP called for a socialist program of nationalization of both private enterprises and religious schools; the UNP preferred to leave both in private hands.

== Results ==
The SLFP obtained a bare majority, despite getting a lower share of the popular vote than the UNP, and Mrs. Bandaranaike became prime minister. This was the first time in history a woman led her party to victory in a general election and thus becoming prime minister.

Party	Votes	%	Seats
United National Party	1,144,166	37.19	30
Sri Lanka Freedom Party	1,022,171	33.22	75
Lanka Sama Samaja Party	224,995	7.31	12
Illankai Tamil Arasu Kachchi	213,733	6.95	16
Mahajana Eksath Peramuna	106,816	3.47	3
Communist Party of Ceylon	90,219	2.93	4
All Ceylon Tamil Congress	46,804	1.52	1
Lanka Democratic Party	30,207	0.98	2
National Liberation Front	14,030	0.46	2
Others	183,728	5.97	6
Total	3,076,869	100.00	151
Registered voters/turnout	3,724,507	75.9	
Source: Nohlen et al.
