= V. Ponnambalam =

Sri Lankan Tamil politician and teacher

- வ. பொன்னம்பலம்
- Born: 18 December 1930
- Died: 5 March 1994 (aged 63); Toronto, Canada
- Education: Madras Christian College
- Occupation: Teacher

Vallipuram Ponnambalam (Tamil: வ. பொன்னம்பலம்; 18 December 1930 – 5 March 1994; commonly known as VP) was a Sri Lankan Tamil politician and teacher. He was a prominent leader of the left-wing in northern Sri Lanka. He served as the secretary of the Jaffna District Committee of the Communist Party of Ceylon. Ponnambalam was noted for his 'clean image' as a political leader.

== Early life and family ==
Sinnappu Vallipuram Ponnambalam was born on 18 December 1930. He was son of Vallipuram and Ponnammah from Alaveddy in northern Ceylon. He was educated at Arunothaya School and Skanda Varothaya College, Kandarodai.

Ponnambalam did his undergraduate and graduate studies at the Madras Christian College in India. He had gotten admitted at the college through the recommendation of S. J. V. Chelvanayakam, leader of the Federal Party and Member of Parliament. At the time Ponnambalam was a sympathiser of the Federal Party and helped Chelvanayakam in his election campaign. At the college Ponnambalam came into contact with communists and carried out social work with them. He became a Marxist.

Ponnambalam married Pooranam, daughter of Kanapathipillai from Karainagar, in 1956. They had two sons – Mavalirajan and Namunakulan. After Pooranam's death in 1974 Ponnambalam married Puvaneswari, daughter of Nagarethinam. They had a daughter, Semchuldar.

== Teaching career ==
Ponnambalam became a teacher at Skanda Varothaya College in 1951. He was later principal of Vidyananda College, Mulliyawalai and a lecturer at Palaly Training College.

== Political career ==
On his return to Ceylon from India in 1950, Ponnambalam joined the Communist Party. He became an active member of the party, attending conferences in the Soviet Union and China. He was elected to Mallakam Village Committee in 1952.

Ponnambalam contested the Kankesanthurai Electoral District seat on a Communist Party ticket in the 1956 parliamentary election. He finished in third place, with 4,313 votes (15.77% of the votes in the constituency). The election was won by S. J. V. Chelvanayakam. He stood as the Communist Party candidate in the Uduvil Electoral District in the March 1960 parliamentary election. He finished in third place, with 3,541 votes (17.27%). The winning candidate, V. Dharmalingam, was a close friend of V. Ponnambalam. In 1962 Ponnambalam became chairman of Mallakam-Alaveddy Village Committee. He was elected district secretary for the Communist Party in 1963.

Ponnambalam again contested the Kankesanthurai seat in the 1970 parliamentary election, challenging the Tamil political leader S. J. V. Chelvanayakam once again. Ponnambalam enjoyed strong support from depressed classes and radical youth in the area. In his campaign he accused the Federal Party of resisting progressive measures, such as school, bus service and petroleum distribution nationalisation as well as the enactment of the Paddy Lands Act. He finished in second place with 8,164 votes (26.75%).

== Build-up of tension ==
In the process of preparing the new 1972 Constitution, the Jaffna District Committee of the Communist Party argued that the 1957 Bandaranaike–Chelvanayakam Pact be incorporated in the new Constitution. They requested the Communist Party leader Pieter Keuneman to facilitate a meeting with the Prime Minister Sirimavo Bandaranaike and the Minister of Constitutional Affairs Colvin R. de Silva. Ponnabalam headed the Jaffna District Communist Party delegation at the meeting. He argued that with the implementation of the 1957 pact the emergence of a large-scale Tamil insurgency could be avoided. According to Ponnabalam's account Bandaranaike was initially sympathetic to the proposal but was swayed by de Silva to reject it.

On 5 October 1974, the Tamil New Tigers ignited dynamite in the residence of Ponnambalam. The attack happened at the same time as Ponnambalam was acting as interpreter for the Prime Minister at a public meeting in Chunnakam.

== 1975 by-election ==
On 6 February 1975 a bye-election was held for the Kankesanthurai seat (Chelvanayakam had resigned from the seat two years before). Again Chelvanayakam and Ponnambalam confronted each other. Ponnambalam was the candidate of the governing United Front coalition. He lost to Chelvanayakam, who increased his victory margin. Chelvanayakam obtained 25,927 votes and V. Ponnambalam obtained 9,457 votes. The election campaign was marred with tension, and the government assigned a bodyguard for Ponnambalam for his protection.

== Departure from the Communist Party ==
Dissatisfied with developments inside the Communist Party in regards to the Tamil question, Ponnambalam left the party in 1976. In reaction to Ponnambalam's departure from the party, it was stated that "with him went the last bastion of the Left movement in the North."

Ponnambalam subsequently founded a new movement, Senthamizhar Iyakkam ('Red Tamil Movement'), a group which would align itself with the Tamil United Liberation Front (TULF), the main Tamil political party. In 1978 he published the booklet Senthamizhar Aagividuvom ('Let's become Red Tamils'), a manifest detailing his shift towards Tamil nationalism. Ponnambalam borrowed heavily from Lenin's positions on the national question. With the Red Tamil Movement Ponnambalam sought to align with TULF and its leader A. Amirthalingam and move it towards socialist positions. Amirthalingam's candidature in the Kankesanthurai seat at the 1977 parliamentary election was proposed by Ponnambalam.

== Later years ==
However Ponnabalam's new party failed to make any significant impact. Ponnambalam withdrew from political life and in 1978 shifted his residence to Lusaka, Zambia where he taught at the Co-operative College. He returned to Sri Lanka in the early 1980s, and was active in the Tamil nationalist camp.

Ponnambalam migrated to Canada in 1985. He died on 5 March 1994 in Toronto.
