= V. Karalasingham =

Ceylonese politician (1921–1983)

- வி. காராளசிங்கம்
- Born: July 1921
- Died: 8 September 1983 (aged 62)
- Other names: Karlo; Sobhana Roy; V. S. Roy
- Occupation: Lawyer

Vaithianathan Karalasingham (Tamil: வைத்தியநாதன் காராளசிங்கம்; July 1921 – 8 September 1983) was a Ceylon Tamil lawyer, writer, politician and one of the leading members of the Lanka Sama Samaja Party.

== Early life and family ==
Karalasingham was born in July 1921. His father Vaithianathan was a civil servant who worked in several parts of the country. As a result, Karalasingham was educated at schools in Kalutara, Pannipitiya and Colombo, including Ananda College. It was at Ananda that he was given the nickname Karlo by principal L. H. Mettananda. Karalasingham had three brothers including V. Balasingham and V. Thanabalasingham.

Karalasingham had a daughter (Nina) and a son (Chakravarthy).

== Career ==
Karalasingham joined the Lanka Sama Samaja Party (LSSP) in 1939. When World War II broke out in September 1939 the LSSP opposed the "second imperialist war". The LSSP played a major role in a wave of strikes in 1939/40 and consequently it was proscribed in 1940 and its leaders Colvin R. de Silva, Philip Gunawardena, N. M. Perera and Edmund Samarakkody arrested in June 1940. Leslie Goonewardene evaded arrest and went into hiding. The quartet were imprisoned at Welikada Prison but after staging a hunger striker they were transferred to Bogambara Prison. The four LSSP leaders, aided by sympathetic prison guards, escaped from Bogambara on 7 April 1942 and whilst de Silva, Gunawardena and Perera fled to India Samarakkody went into hiding in Ceylon.

Karalasingham was sent to Bombay, India in 1941 and became the "mascot of the Indo-Ceylon revolutionary leadership". In India the LSSP leaders merged their party with the Bolshevik Leninist Party of the United Provinces and Bihar and the Bolshevik Mazdoor Party of India to create the Bolshevik–Leninist Party of India, Ceylon and Burma (BLPI) in April 1942 with the LSSP as its Ceylonese branch. Karalasingham was one of the founding members of the BLPI. De Silva, Gunawardena and Perera were arrested by the Indian police in 1943 after being betrayed by Stalinist called Shukla and deported back to Ceylon. Other LSSP members (Hector Abhayavardhana, Doric de Souza, Leslie Goonewardene, Vivienne Goonewardene, Karalasingham, Allan Mendis and Bernard Soysa) stayed behind in India to build up the BLPI. Karalasingham was editor of the Calcutta based Permanent Revolution between 1943 and 1945. He and de Souza were arrested in Bombay in March 1945, deported to Ceylon and imprisoned in Badulla.

Karalasingham was secretary BLPI's Ceylon branch (1945), served on the editorial board of New Spark (1947–48), member of the BLPI central committee (1947–48) and was a delegate at BLPI conferences (1944, 1947, 1948). He was a delegate at the Third World Congress of the Fourth International in 1951. He studied law in Britain between 1952 and 1958 and on returning to Ceylon became an advocate of the Supreme Court. Karalasingham stood as the LSSP candidate in Kankesanthurai at the March 1960 parliamentary election but on was defeated by S. J. V. Chelvanayakam, leader of the Illankai Tamil Arasu Kachchi.

Whilst Ceylon's main political parties, the United National Party (UNP) and Sri Lanka Freedom Party (SLFP) supported the Sinhala Only Act, the leftists, led by the LSSP, opposed the act. In May 1960 LSSP leader Perera proposed that the party form a coalition government with SLFP. Samarakkody led a group of LSSP members opposed the proposition. De Silva, de Souza, Goonewardene and Soysa initially opposed Perera's proposition but eventually abandoned their beliefs and supported the move. The LSSP joined the SLFP government in June 1964. LSSP members who opposed the move (Meryl Fernando, Karalasingham, Samarakkody, Bala Tampoe etc.) left the LSSP and formed the Lanka Sama Samaja Party (Revolutionary) (LSSP(R)) with Samarakkody as its secretary. In December 1964 the LSSP(R)'s two MPs, Fernando and Samarakkody, together with several rebel SLFP MPs, voted for an opposition amendment to the government's throne speech, defeating the government and precipitating the dissolution of Parliament.

Karalasingham stood as the LSSP(R) candidate in Kankesanthurai at the 1965 parliamentary election but was again defeated by Chelvanayakam. Fernando and Samarakkody's action in December 1964 proved controversial within the LSSP(R) as they had in effect supported the capitalist UNP which would go on to win the 1965 parliamentary election. The LSSP(R) supported Fernando and Samarakkody's action but some members who opposed it (Karalasingham and the Sakthi group) left the LSSP(R) and rejoined the LSSP in 1966.

Karalasingham stood as the LSSP candidate in Uduvil at the 1970 parliamentary election but on was defeated by sitting MP V. Dharmalingam. He served on the editorial board of State in the 1970s and was a director of the state-owned Air Ceylon between 1970 and 1975 when the LSSP was in a coalition government with the SLFP. Karalasingham died on 8 September 1983.

== Works ==
Karalasingham wrote several books and articles during his career:

- The War in Korea (1950, Janata)
- Politics of Coalition (1964, International Publishers)
- Senile Leftism: A Reply to Edmund Samarakkody (1966, International Publishers)
- Czechoslovakia, 1968 (1968, International Publishers)
- The Way Out for the Tamil Speaking People (1963, Young Socialist)
- Enter History (1970)

== Electoral history ==
Electoral history of V. Karalasingham
Election	Constituency	Party	Votes	Result
1960 March parliamentary	Kankesanthurai	LSSP	5,042	Not elected
1965 parliamentary	Kankesanthurai	LSSP(R)	2,257	Not elected
1970 parliamentary	Uduvil	LSSP	1,264	Not elected
