= Ponnambalam Nagalingam =

Sri Lankan politician

Senator P. Nagalingam

Member of the Senate of Ceylon
- In office 1951–1957

Personal details
- Born: Tellippalai, British Ceylon
- Party: Lanka Sama Samaja Party
- Education: Ceylon Law College
- Profession: Lawyer

Ponnambalam Nagalingam was a Sri Lankan Tamil politician and Member of the Senate.

== Early life ==
Nagalingam was born in Tellippalai, Jaffna District. He was educated at Jaffna College, Vaddukoddai, and Parameswara College, Thirunelveli. He later entered Ceylon Law College. After qualifying as a lawyer Nagalingam practiced law in Tellippalai, Uduvil and Chunnakam.

== Political career ==
Nagalingam became involved in politics as a student, joining the Tamil Youth Congress. In the 1940s he joined the leftist Lanka Sama Samaja Party (LSSP). At the 1947 parliamentary election Nagalingam stood as the LSSP's candidate in Kankesanthurai but was defeated by S. J. V. Chelvanayakam.

Nagalingam was a member of the Senate of Ceylon between 1951 and 1957. At the March 1960 parliamentary election Nagalingam stood as the LSSP's candidate in Uduvil but was defeated by Visvanathan Dharmalingam. He also contested the July 1960 and March 1965 parliamentary elections but each time was defeated by Dharmalingam. Nagalingam was chairman of Chunnakam Town Council in the 1960s.
