= Kankesanthurai Electoral District =

Electoral district of Sri Lanka

Kankesanthurai Electoral District was an electoral district of Sri Lanka between August 1947 and February 1989. The district was named after the town of Kankesanthurai in Jaffna District, Northern Province. The 1978 Constitution of Sri Lanka introduced the proportional representation electoral system for electing members of Parliament. The existing 160 mainly single-member electoral districts were replaced with 22 multi-member electoral districts. Kankesanthurai electoral district was replaced by the Jaffna multi-member electoral district at the 1989 general elections, the first under the PR system, though Kankesanthurai continues to be a polling division of the multi-member electoral district.

== Members of Parliament ==
Key

ACTC ITAK TULF UNP

Election	Member	Party	Term
1947	S. J. V. Chelvanayakam	All Ceylon Tamil Congress	1947–1952
1952	S. Natesan	United National Party	1952–1956
1956	S. J. V. Chelvanayakam	Illankai Tamil Arasu Kachchi	1956-1977
1960 (March)	S. J. V. Chelvanayakam	Illankai Tamil Arasu Kachchi	1956-1977
1960 (July)	S. J. V. Chelvanayakam	Illankai Tamil Arasu Kachchi	1956-1977
1965	S. J. V. Chelvanayakam	Illankai Tamil Arasu Kachchi	1956-1977
1970	S. J. V. Chelvanayakam	Illankai Tamil Arasu Kachchi	1956-1977
1975 by	S. J. V. Chelvanayakam	Tamil United Front	1956-1977
1977	A. Amirthalingam	Tamil United Liberation Front	1977–1989

== Elections ==
=== 1947 Parliamentary General Election ===
Results of the 1st parliamentary election held between 23 August 1947 and 20 September 1947:

Candidate	Party	Symbol	Votes	%
S. J. V. Chelvanayakam	All Ceylon Tamil Congress	Key	12,126	55.39%
Ponnambalam Nagalingam	Lanka Sama Samaja Party	Hand	5,160	23.57%
S. Natesan	United National Party	Pair of Scales	4,605	21.04%
Valid Votes			21,891	100.00%
Rejected Votes			534	
Total Polled			22,425	
Registered Electors			38,871	
Turnout			57.69%	

=== 1952 Parliamentary General Election ===
Results of the 2nd parliamentary election held between 24 May 1952 and 30 May 1952:

Candidate	Party	Symbol	Votes	%
S. Natesan	United National Party	Key	15,337	57.00%
S. J. V. Chelvanayakam	Illankai Tamil Arasu Kachchi	Bicycle	11,571	43.00%
Valid Votes			26,908	100.00%
Rejected Votes			355	
Total Polled			27,263	
Registered Electors			38,439	
Turnout			70.93%	

=== 1956 Parliamentary General Election ===
Results of the 3rd parliamentary election held between 5 April 1956 and 10 April 1956:

Candidate	Party	Symbol	Votes	%
S. J. V. Chelvanayakam	Illankai Tamil Arasu Kachchi	House	14,855	54.30%
S. Natesan	Independent	Umbrella	8,188	29.39%
V. Ponnampalam	Communist Party	Star	4,313	15.77%
Valid Votes			27,356	100.00%
Rejected Votes			317	
Total Polled			27,673	
Registered Electors			40,964	
Turnout			67.55%	

=== 1960 (March) Parliamentary General Election ===
Results of the 4th parliamentary election held on 19 March 1960:

Candidate	Party	Symbol	Votes	%
S. J. V. Chelvanayakam	Illankai Tamil Arasu Kachchi	House	13,545	67.61%
V. Karalasingham	Lanka Sama Samaja Party	Key	5,042	25.17%
R. N. Sivapirakasam	All Ceylon Tamil Congress	Bicycle	1,448	7.23%
Valid Votes			20,035	100.00%
Rejected Votes			244	
Total Polled			20,279	
Registered Electors			28,473	
Turnout			71.22%	

=== 1960 (July) Parliamentary General Election ===
Results of the 5th parliamentary election held on 20 July 1960:

Candidate	Party	Symbol	Votes	%
S. J. V. Chelvanayakam	Illankai Tamil Arasu Kachchi	House	15,668	88.63%
R. N. Sivapirakasam	All Ceylon Tamil Congress	Pair of Spectacles	2,009	11.37%
Valid Votes			17,677	100.00%
Rejected Votes			131	
Total Polled			17,808	
Registered Electors			28,473	
Turnout			62.54%	

=== 1965 Parliamentary General Election ===
Results of the 6th parliamentary election held on 22 March 1965:

Candidate	Party	Symbol	Votes	%
S. J. V. Chelvanayakam	Illankai Tamil Arasu Kachchi	House	14,735	58.24%
S. Sri Bhaskaran	All Ceylon Tamil Congress	Bicycle	6,611	26.13%
V. Karalasingham	Lanka Sama Samaja Party (R)	Lamp	2,257	8.92%
K. Vaikunthavasan	Communist Party (Moscow)	Star	958	3.79%
V. Seenivasagam	Communist Party (Peking)	Umbrella	741	2.93%
Valid Votes			25,302	100.00%
Rejected Votes			269	
Total Polled			25,571	
Registered Electors			35,309	
Turnout			72.42%	

=== 1970 Parliamentary General Election ===
Results of the 7th parliamentary election held on 27 May 1970:

Candidate	Party	Symbol	Votes	%
S. J. V. Chelvanayakam	Illankai Tamil Arasu Kachchi	House	13,520	44.29%
V. Ponnampalam	Communist Party	Star	8,164	26.75%
C. Suntharalingam	Independent	Cockerel	5,788	18.96%
T. Thirunavukarasu	All Ceylon Tamil Congress	Bicycle	3,051	10.00%
Valid Votes			30,523	100.00%
Rejected Votes			140	
Total Polled			30,663	
Registered Electors			37,804	
Turnout			81.11%	

=== 1975 by-election ===
Candidate	Party	Symbol	Votes	%
S.J.V. Chelvanayakam	Tamil United Front	House	25,927	72.55%
V. Ponnampalam	Communist Party	Star	9,457	26.46%
M. Ambalavanar		Ship	185	0.52%
Valid Votes			35,569	100.00%
Rejected Votes			168	
Total Polled			35,737	
Registered Electors			41,227	
Turnout			86.68%	

=== 1977 Parliamentary General Election ===
Results of the 8th parliamentary election held on 21 July 1977:

Candidate	Party	Symbol	Votes	%
A. Amirthalingam	Tamil United Liberation Front	Sun	31,155	85.41%
Sivapiragasam Sritharan	Independent	Pair of Scales	5,322	14.59%
Valid Votes			36,477	100.00%
Rejected Votes			218	
Total Polled			36,695	
Registered Electors			43,907	
Turnout			83.57%	

A. Amirthalingam and all other TULF MPs boycotted Parliament from the middle of 1983 for a number of reasons: they were under pressure from Sri Lankan Tamil militants not to stay in Parliament beyond their normal six-year term; the Sixth Amendment to the Constitution of Sri Lanka required them to swear an oath unconditionally renouncing support for a separate state; and the Black July riots in which up to 3,000 Tamils were murdered by Sinhalese mobs. After three months of absence, Amirthalingam forfeited his seat in Parliament on 22 October 1983.
