= Pandian (film) =

1992 film by S. P. Muthuraman

- Theatrical release poster
- Directed by: S. P. Muthuraman
- Screenplay by: Panchu Arunachalam
- Story by: Prabhakar
- Produced by: S. P. Muthuraman
- Starring: Rajinikanth; Khushbu
- Cinematography: T. S. Vinayagam
- Edited by: R. Vittal
- Music by: Ilaiyaraaja
- Production company: Visaalam Productions
- Release date: 25 October 1992
- Running time: 135 minutes
- Country: India
- Language: Tamil

Pandian is a 1992 Indian Tamil-language action film produced and directed by S. P. Muthuraman and written by Panchu Arunachalam. The film stars Rajinikanth and Khushbu, with Janagaraj, Prabhakar and Vinu Chakravarthy in supporting roles. It is a remake of the 1991 Kannada film Bombay Dada which was directed by and starred Prabhakar, who portrayed the antagonist of this film. The film was released on 25 October 1992 during Diwali and performed averagely at the box office.

== Plot ==
Ashok Kumar IPS, a CBI officer, discovers hoarded ammunition and drugs during a raid at Vedaranyam harbour. The influential gangster‑exporter Parameshwaran's men capture him, and Parameshwaran orders his right‑hand man, Philips, to kill him. Pandian returns to his hometown after six years, clashing with his sister, Inspector Vijayalakshmi "Vijaya", a strict rule‑follower. He fights goons disturbing public peace, but Vijaya arrests him despite public support. His friend, photographer Vinayagam, and the townspeople bail him out. At home, Pandian hides what he's been doing for the past six years. Vijaya disapproves of Pandian's violent methods, even though he fights for the right cause. She sees him as useless, yet he clears the family's debts.

Pandian arranges for the groom's family to meet Vijaya for her marriage, but she makes their younger sister Rani dress as the bride. Pandian covers Rani's marriage expenses, and she gets married. On New Year's Eve, a dance battle between Pandian and Vinayagam's niece, Rekha, takes place. The challenge: the loser must kiss the winner. Pandian refuses to accept the kiss from Rekha, which makes her instantly fall in love with him. Vinayagam loves Rekha one‑sidedly, but Pandian mistakenly thinks Vinayagam loves Rekha's friend Mala. Rekha lies to Vinayagam, saying Mala loves Pandian. Vinayagam soon learns Rekha's feelings for Pandian and informs him. During a fake‑police raid at a club owned by Rekha's father, Rajendran, Pandian intervenes, beats the fake cops, and earns Rajendran's trust, getting appointed as the club's chief security officer.

Meanwhile, Vijaya receives a call from Sathya saying her toddler Priya is missing. Unable to locate Priya, Vijaya is shattered. Her family is stunned to learn that Priya is her biological daughter. Vijaya reveals her past: five years earlier, she was in love with IPS officer Ashok. After they consummated, Ashok vanished on a secret mission and never returned. Keeping it hidden, Vijaya moved to Bengaluru, gave birth to Priya, and raised her under Sathya's care. It's revealed that Pandian already knew about Vijaya's past, and to reunite her with Priya, he staged Priya's "missing" incident and brought her home. Vijaya, with a change of heart, accepts Pandian staying with them and acknowledges his love for Rekha.

Rajendran entrusts a valuable consignment to Pandian for transport to Vedaranyam, meant for Parameshwaran. Periyasamy learns of the shipment and orders his goons to hijack it. En route, Pandian is ambushed by Periyasamy's brother Chinnasamy and his men, but he slips through and reaches Vedaranyam. Pandian is shocked to spot Ashok's distinctive bracelet on Philips. Parameshwaran, impressed by Pandian's bravery, offers him a place in his gang, but he declines. Back home, Vijaya recognizes the bracelet as the one she gifted to Ashok. Fearing danger, she hides the truth from Pandian and secures a voluntary transfer to Vedaranyam. In Vedaranyam, Vijaya saves a press reporter from Periyasamy and Chinnasamy. Their goons retaliate, but Pandian intervenes and rescues her.

Despite her disapproval, Pandian joins Parameshwaran's gang. Investigating the villagers, Vijaya learns Ashok was last seen with Parameshwaran's men, deepening her suspicion. She confronts Parameshwaran, who denies any knowledge of Ashok. Departmental pressure mounts on her to stay away from Parameshwaran's business. Rekha follows Pandian to Vedaranyam but pretends to be indifferent. Pandian, trying to stir jealousy, gets close to dancer Reeta. Periyasamy and Chinnasamy inform Parameshwaran that Pandian is Vijaya's brother, shocking him. Suspecting Pandian of spying, Parameshwaran orders a corrupt SP to eliminate Vijaya, just as they did with Ashok. Pandian overhears the plot and rushes to protect his sister.

Vijaya is lured to a mountain forest with a false claim that Pandian is in danger. A scuffle erupts were Vijaya accidentally shoots Periyasamy and Chinnasamy. She is arrested, handcuffed, and paraded for public humiliation. At that moment, Pandian appears in an IPS uniform, shocking everyone, and takes custody of her. He reveals to Vijaya that her lover Ashok was his close friend in Delhi and that he was secretly assigned to locate the missing Ashok. Pandian also shares that, according to the conversation he overheard, Ashok is dead. Vijaya clarifies that she didn't shoot the brothers; the gun was actually fired and then planted by Philips into her hands. To free Vijaya, Pandian captures Philips and forces him to confess and write stating that Parameshwaran ordered the murders of Chinnasamy and Periyasamy and framed Vijaya. Armed with this proof, Pandian arrests Parameshwaran and parades him publicly.

In court, Parameshwaran's lawyer claims Philips had lost both hand fingers in an accident and is mute, arguing the confession couldn't have been written by him. He produces fabricated evidence and suggests Vijaya might have killed Ashok out of revenge. The judge acquits Parameshwaran and Philips but sentences Vijaya to life for the murders of Ashok, Chinnasamy, and Periyasamy. Vijaya urges Pandian to quit the police, embrace his earlier violent methods, and fight for justice. Pandian beats the perjury‑witness doctor, the corrupt SP, and Parameshwaran's lawyer, dragging them before the judge. The judge reopens the case after learning that, under Parameshwaran's bribe, Philips's fingers and tongue were surgically removed while in custody.

Pandian beats Philips and Parameshwaran's henchmen, and finally engages in a one‑to‑one fight with Parameshwaran. Meanwhile, Parameshwaran has kidnapped Rekha, Priya, and Meenakshiammal. In a desperate move, he handcuffs himself to Pandian with a time bomb, planning to die together with Pandian and his family. With two minutes left, Pandian cuts off Parameshwaran's hand and escapes just as the bomb detonates, killing Parameshwaran. The film ends with Vijayalakshmi released from prison and happily reunited with her family.

== Cast ==
- Rajinikanth as Pandian IPS
- Khushbu as Rekha
- Janagaraj as Vinayagam
- Prabhakar as Parameshwaran
- Vinu Chakravarthy as Rajendran, Rekha's father
- Charan Raj in a guest appearance as Ashok Kumar "Ashok" IPS
- Radha Ravi in a guest appearance as Parameshwaran's advocate
- Delhi Ganesh in a guest appearance as a public prosecutor
- Rocky as Philips
- Uday Prakash as Chinnasamy
- Prathapachandran as the SP
- Natraj as a press reporter
- M. R. Krishnamurthy as the groom's father
- V. Narasimhan as the Commissioner
- Typist Gopu as Constable Kannaiyan
- Nagaraja Cholan as Parameshwaran's henchman
- Dubbing Janaki as Meenakshiammal, Pandian's mother
- Baby Monisha as Priya, Vijaya's daughter
- Archana Puran Singh as Reeta
- Anuja as Mala, Rekha's friend
- Sathya as Sathya, Vijaya's maid
- Jayasudha as Inspector Vijayalakshmi "Vijaya"
- Ponnambalam in an uncredited role as a goon

== Production ==
Rajinikanth decided to make a low-budget film with director S. P. Muthuraman. Muthuraman produced the film under his production banner Visaalam Productions, named after his mother. Although not being a producer, Rajinikanth took care of production duties of the film along with M. Saravanan. Rajinikanth decided to act in the film to contribute to the retirement fund of main crew members of the Muthuraman team who were regulars in most of the latter's films. The film title was initially titled Nanban (transl. Friend) before being retitled to Pandian. It was Muthuraman's penultimate film as director, and remade from the 1991 Kannada film Bombay Dada. Prabhakar, who directed the film and acted as the protagonist, portrayed a different role in Pandian, the antagonist. Rajinikanth acted in the film without taking any remuneration. This would be the last film in Rajinikanth portrayed a police officer until the release of Darbar (2020).

== Soundtrack ==
The soundtrack was composed by Ilaiyaraaja, while his son Karthik Raja composed "Pandianin Rajyathil", his first song.

Track listing
No.	Title	Lyrics	Singer(s)	Length
1.	"Ulagathukaaga"	Vaali	Mano	4:49
2.	"Adi Jumba"	Vaali	Mano, K. S. Chithra	6:00
3.	"Anbe Nee Enna"	Vaali	Mano, K. S. Chithra	4:41
4.	"Pandiayana Kokka Kokka"	Vaali	Mano	4:56
5.	"Pandiyanin Rajiyathil"	Panchu Arunachalam	Ilayaraja, Sindhu Devi	5:44
Total length:				31:54

== Release ==
Pandiyan was released on 25 October 1992, Diwali day. Though Muthuraman's wife died 10 days before, he refused the crew's suggestion to postpone the release. The film opened up against other Diwali releases such as Thevar Magan, Senthamizh Paattu, Thirumathi Palanisamy and Rasukutty. Due to facing competition from Thevar Magan, Pandiyan achieved only moderate success. Even though it made some money, the money grossed was used for the retirement fund of Muthuraman's crew.

== Critical reception ==
Malini Mannath of The Indian Express called it "a typical Rajini film; a mishmash of all ingredients formulated to please his fans". K. Vijiyan of New Straits Times wrote, "This 135-minute movie is only for hard-core Rajini fans". C. R. K. of Kalki praised Muthuraman for taking a simple knot and making it interesting for seventeen reels which clearly shows his experience.
