= Ponnambalam =

Ponnambalam பொன்னம்பலம்
- Pronunciation: Poṉṉampalam
- Gender: Male
- Language: Tamil

Origin
- Region of origin: Southern India; North-eastern Sri Lanka

Other names
- Alternative spelling: Ponnampalam

Ponnambalam or Ponnampalam (Tamil: பொன்னம்பலம்) is a Tamil male given name. Due to the Tamil tradition of using patronymic surnames it may also be a surname for males and females.

== Given name ==
- Ponnambalam (actor) (born 1963), Indian actor
- A. Ponnambalam (1814–1887), Ceylonese colonial-era government functionary
- Cathiravelu Ponnambalam, Ceylonese politician
- G. G. Ponnambalam (1901–1977), Ceylonese politician and lawyer
- V. Ponnambalam (1930–1994), Sri Lankan politician and teacher

== Surname ==
- Gajendrakumar Ponnambalam (born 1974), Sri Lankan politician
- Kaarthigesar Ponnambalam Ratnam (1914–2010), Ceylonese politician and academic
- Kumar Ponnambalam (1938–2000), Sri Lankan politician and lawyer
- Ponnambalam Arunachalam (1853–1924), Ceylonese statesman
- Ponnambalam Kandiah (1914–1960), Ceylonese politician
- Ponnambalam Kumaraswamy (1930–1988), Indian hydrologist
- Ponnambalam Nagalingam, Ceylonese politician
- Ponnambalam Ramanathan (1851–1930), Ceylonese politician
- Ponnambalam Selvarasa (born 1946), Sri Lankan politician
- Satchi Ponnambalam (1935–1999), Sri Lankan lawyer and judge
