= Kadduvan =

Kadduvan கட்டுவன்
- Town
- Location within Northern Province
- Coordinates: 9°47′0″N 80°2′0″E
- Country: Sri Lanka
- Province: Northern
- District: Jaffna
- DS Division: Valikamam North
- Website: www.kadduvan.com

Kadduvan (Tamil: கட்டுவன்) is a small town in the northern Jaffna District of Sri Lanka.

It is situated along the Vallai–Tellippalai-Arali road between Vasavilan and Tellippalai. The Kadduvan Grama Sevaka (GS) division J/238 is located in the Valikamam North Division.

Kadduvan is one of the oldest towns in Jaffna District and a traditional village. While most of the traditional folk dances of the Jaffna District vanished during the long Colonial history of Sri Lanka, the folk dance ‘vasanthan” (Tamil: வசந்தன் or வயந்தன்) has survived until the beginning of the Sri Lankan Civil War. Though this dance form is similar to “Kolaaddam” (Tamil: கோலாட்டம்), it has some unique features. It has an original rhythm and tune as well as old traditional lyrics. It is performed in temples by adult males during "Navarathiri" (Tamil: நவராத்திரி) festival time. It is also believed that the performance at the temple will bring rain.

Tamil scholar Pandithar Namasivayam who was a student of Vidwa Siromani C. Ganesha Iyer is from Kadduvan. He was awarded the honor of illakkanna viththakar (Tamil: இலக்கண வித்தகர்) by the University of Jaffna at its first convocation in 1979.

Due to the Sri Lankan Civil War the village has come under the high security zone since 1990 being proximate to the Palali military base adjoining Palali airport.

Sri Lankan government cabinet has decided to release 400 acres in Palai Veemankamam south and Varuthalaivilan, 300 acres in Kadduvan and Kurumbasiddy for re-settlement Araly-Tellippalai road up to Kadduvan junction was released from army control in July 2016. The rectangular area covering the places Tellippalai, Kadduvan and Mallakam is completely released.
