= T. Sathasiva Iyer =

Ceylon Tamil scholar

Muhandiram Sathasiva Iyer
- Born: T. Sathasiva Iyer; 1882; Alaveddy, Jaffna, Ceylon
- Died: 27 November 1950 (aged 67–68)
- Known for: Tamil Scholar, teacher
- Parent(s): Thiyagaraja Iyer; Chellammal

Muhandiram T. Sathasiva Iyer (Note: The word Muhandiram is not a part of his name. It is a title prevalent in Sri Lanka during the Colonial British rule. It is found before his name on the web pages referenced here and several writeups in Tamil language books and periodicals. It can be safely assumed that the Colonial government bestowed this title on him for his services to the society. The word is used with his name in this article in synonym with other articles about him on other sources only.) (Tamil: முகாந்திரம் தி. சதாசிவ ஐயர்; 1882 – 27 November 1950) is a Ceylon Tamil scholar and a writer in Tamil language. He has translated many Sanskrit literature into Tamil.

== Life Notes ==
Sathasiva Iyer was born at Alaveddy, Jaffna in 1882 as the only son to his parents Thiyagaraja Iyer and Chellammal. He served in the department of Education of Ceylon during colonial times first as a teacher and rose up the ladder as Head Master, School Inspector and then as the Director of Education.

== As a Writer ==
He was a scholar in Sanskrit, Tamil and English. He translated "Ritu Samhara" written by the famous Sanskrit Poet Kalidasa. It is a poetical creation depicting the six seasons. The poems show the different facets of nature during each season. It is a romantic sight. Sathasiva Iyer named it as Ritu Samhara Kaviyam (Tamil: இருது சங்கார காவியம்).

Another book written by him is a literary work where he has published an ancient Tamil literature Ainguru Nooru (Tamil ஐங்குறு நூறு) that was in poetry interpreted by him in verse.

He also translated religious devotional poems from Sanskrit to Tamil. Devi Thoththira Manchari (Poetic composition in praise of Goddess Devi) and Devi Maanasa poosai anthaathi (Mental Worship of Devi) are two examples; there are others. Anthaathi is a style in Tamil poetry wherein stanzas are composed so that the terminal part of a stanza becomes the initial part of the next.

Batticaloa district in the Eastern Province is famous for its folk songs (நாட்டார் பாடல்கள்). Sathasiva Iyer collected the Palm-leaf manuscripts from interior areas, printed and published them as a book with the title Vasanthan Kavi Thirattu. Vasanthan is the local name for folk songs. Sometimes it is called as Vayanthan.

He also helped in the publication of a compilation of Children's songs in Tamil. Around 1942, he served as the editor of a Tamil journal named Kalanithi that served to improve Tamil culture. In 1945 he also served as Editor of a quarterly journal called SuvaDharma Potham.

== Social works ==
Sathasiva Iyer took an important role in the establishment of Arya Dravida Bhasha Viruthi Sangam (Academy for the Development of Aryan and Dravidian languages). The Academy conducted Pravesa Pandithar (entrance examination), Bala Pandithar and Pandithar examinations. These qualifications were recognised by the government. He took necessary steps so that those who qualified in these examinations got teaching jobs in schools and colleges. Even serving teachers sat for these examinations as this additional qualification enabled them for an increased salary. Those who qualified in Bala Pandithar got an increase of 5 rupees while those who passed Pandithar examination got 10 rupees increase. These amounts may look ridiculous in today's context but considering that a teacher's starting salary was 43 rupees, at that time, the figures represent 11.6 percent and 23.25 percent respectively; a significant increase.

He established a school opposite Chunnakam Kathiramalai Devasthanam, where Tamil and Sanskrit were taught to students by eminent teachers. The famed Tamil scholar Vidwa Siromani C. Ganesha Iyer had been in charge of this school.
