= Akila Thirunayaki =

Sri Lankan track and field athlete

Personal information
- Full name: Akila Thirunayaki Sriseyananthapavan
- Nationality: Sri Lankan

Sport
- Country: Sri Lanka
- Sport: Athletics
- Events: 400m, 800m, 1500m, 5000m
Medal record
Women's Athletics
Representing Sri Lanka
Asia Masters Athletics Championships
Gold medal – first place	2023 Philippines	1500m
Gold medal – first place	2023 Philippines	5000m
Bronze medal – third place	2023 Philippines	800m

Akila Thirunayaki Sriseyananthapavan (Tamil: அகிலத்திருநாயகி; born c. 1952), also spelled Akila Thirunayagi, is a Sri Lankan track and field athlete and a retired prison officer. In November 2023, she rose to prominence for winning multiple medals at the age of 71 during the Asia Masters Athletics Championships.

== Biography ==
Akila Thirunayaki hails from a humble family background. She grew up in Mulliyawalai village, Mullaitivu in the Northern Province, Sri Lanka.

== Career ==
She claimed two gold medals and a solitary bronze medals representing Sri Lanka at the 2023 Asia Masters Athletics Championships which was held in the Philippines. She was highly applauded for her medal success, given that she achieved the feat at the age of 71. She clinched gold medals in the women's 1500m and 5000m race events and followed it up with a bronze medal achievement in the women's 800m competition. She narrowly missed out on a fourth medal after securing a fourth-place finish in the women's 400m competition during the 2023 Asia Masters Athletics Championships. She was also commended for claiming medals for running barefoot against her opponents in the field.
