= Alaveddy =

Alaveddy அளவெட்டி ඇලවැද්ද
- Location in Northern Province
- Coordinates: 009°46′04″N 80°00′20″E
- Country: Sri Lanka
- Province: Northern Province
- Time zone: UTC+5:30 (Sri Lanka Standard Time)

Alaveddy (Tamil: அளவெட்டி, romanized: Aḷaveṭṭi; Sinhala: ඇලවැද්ද, romanized: Ælavædda) is an area of North Valigamam (Valikamam) Division, Jaffna District, Sri Lanka. It consists of five village tracts: Alaveddy North, Alaveddy Centre, Alaveddy East, Alaveddy South and Alaveddy West. Nearby villages are Uduvil, Chunnakam, Makiyappiddy, Sankuveli and Siruvilan. The nearest town is Sandilipay.

== Temples ==
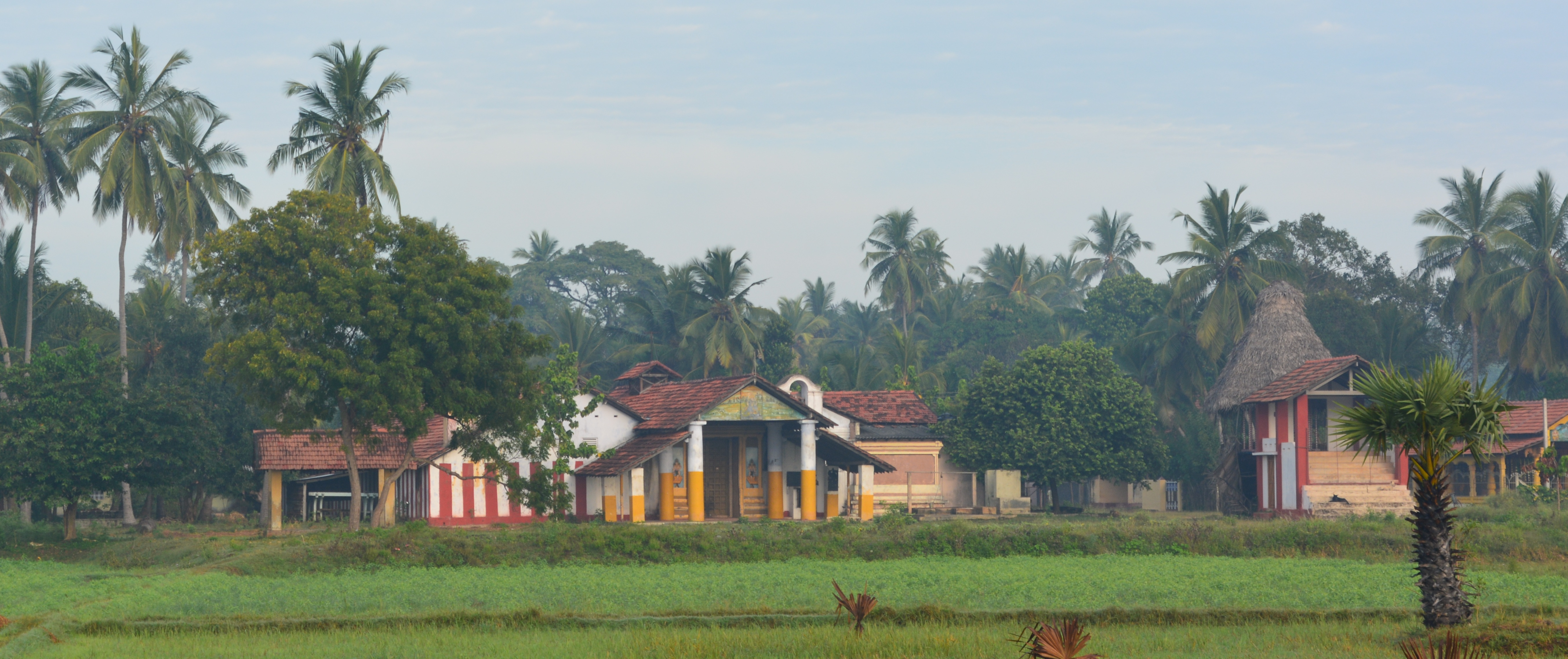
Perumakkadavai Sri Siththi Vinayagar Temple

The area has a number of temples, such as the Perumakkadavai Sri Siththi Vinayagar Temple which has a history of more than 700 years and it is administrated by Maniyakar Family for generations. Though this temple was under the administration of Rasakaria Sinkai Ariya Ambalavana Mudaliyar, Mr. Sinnaththambar, Mr. Kandiah, Mr. Nadarajah, Mr. Nadarajah Sivarajah this historical and ancient temple is now managed by Mr. Sivarajah Gokulan who is the Managing Trustee of this temple.

Shri Kumbalavalai Ganesha Temple, Kurukkal Kinnathadi Ganesha Temple, which is almost 650 years old.

== Notable Persons ==
- Alaveddy is the birthplace of Rasakaria Sinkai Ariya Ambalavana Mudaliyar, Maniagar of Valigamam (1845-1885 A.D)
- Alaveddy is also the birthplace of Muhandiram T. Sathasiva Iyer who was the Director of Education for the combined Northern and Eastern provinces of Sri Lanka.
- V. Ponnambalam - Teacher, Politician, District secretary for the Communist Party

== See also ==
- List of towns in Northern Province, Sri Lanka
