= 1975 Kankesanthurai Electoral District by-election =

- 6 February 1975
- Turnout: 86.68%
Candidate	S. J. V. Chelvanayakam	V. Ponnambalam
Party	Tamil United Front	Communist Party
Popular vote	25,927	9,457
Percentage	72.55%	26.46%
MP before election
S. J. V. Chelvanayakam
ITAK
Elected MP
S. J. V. Chelvanayakam
Tamil United Front

A by-election for the National State Assembly seat of the Kankesanthurai Electoral District, Jaffna District, Sri Lanka, was held on 6 February 1975. The election was characterised by increased tension and marked a turning point in the emergence of Tamil militancy.

== Background ==
The incumbent Member of Parliament, the Tamil United Front S.J.V. Chelvanayakam, had resigned from his seat in October 1972 in protest against the new Constitution. Chelvanayakam argued that the by-election would function as a test of whether the new Constitution enjoyed popular support or not.

However the holding of the by-election was delayed. On 4 November 1973 Chelvayakam wrote to the Prime Minister Sirimavo Bandaranaike, assuring her that the election would be held without violent disturbances. As the election continued to be postponed, the Tamil movement grew more and more restless and gradually lost faith in the parliamentary process.

== Candidates ==
The final date for nominations was 7 January 1975. In the end the by-poll was fought between Chelvanayakam and the Communist Party candidate V. Ponnambalam. Ponnambalam was the candidate of the governing United Front coalition.

== Rising tensions ==
The political climate in the Jaffna area (to which the constituency belonged) had become increasingly heated. Calls for a separate Tamil homeland, 'Eelam', were heard from the electorate in run-up to the polls. In the election campaign Chelvanayakam argued in favour of the Six Point Plan proposed by the Federal Party in 1972. Ponnambalam warned that a victory for Chelvanayakam would embolden separatist forces. The Communist Party had pushed the Sri Lanka Freedom Party to agree that the demands for far-reaching autonomy (beyond the 1957 Bandaranaike–Chelvanayakam Pact) would be used in the electoral propaganda. However he promised printed material with this demand never arrived, to the frustration of Ponnambalam.

The election campaign was marred with tension, and the government assigned a bodyguard for Ponnambalam for his protection.

== Amnesty ==
In 1974 forty-one Tamil youths, detained under emergency regulations, were released from jail in the run-up to the by-election. These amnesties on behalf of the government was a move seak appeasement.

== Result ==
Candidate	Party	Symbol	Votes	%
S.J.V. Chelvanayakam	Tamil United Front	House	25,927	72.55%
V. Ponnampalam	Communist Party	Star	9,457	26.46%
M. Ambalavanar		Ship	185	0.52%
Valid Votes			35,569	100.00%
Rejected Votes			168	
Total Polled			35,737	
Registered Electors			41,227	
Turnout			86.68%	

== Aftermath ==
Chelvanayakam had retained the seat with the biggest margin in the history of the constituency. Chelvanayakam interpreted the election outcome as popular mandate for Tamil independence. The statement made by Chelvanayakam on 7 February 1975 would mark a turning point in the history of the country, in which he justified the call for Tamil sovereignty. This statement marked the first formal pledge for a sovereign Tamil Eelam state.

Subsequently the name of TUF was changed to 'Tamil United Liberation Front'. In parliament, however, Chelvanayakam was not allowed to table his proposal for 'Eelam'.

The by-election marked the end for the aspirations of the Sri Lankan left-wing in the North. However the vote for Ponnambalam was substantial, compared to the popular rejection in the area of Bandaranaike's government at time. Ponnambalam later stated that he regretted having stood in the election. The election left him disillusioned with the Communist Party and the United Front, and he left withdrew from it.
