= Uduvil Electoral District =

Electoral district of Sri Lanka

Uduvil Electoral District was an electoral district of Sri Lanka between March 1960 and February 1989. The district was renamed Manipay Electoral District in July 1977. The district was named after the towns of Uduvil and Manipay in Jaffna District, Northern Province. The 1978 Constitution of Sri Lanka introduced the proportional representation electoral system for electing members of Parliament. The existing 160 mainly single-member electoral districts were replaced with 22 multi-member electoral districts. Manipay electoral district was replaced by the Jaffna multi-member electoral district at the 1989 general elections, the first under the PR system, though Manipay continues to be a polling division of the multi-member electoral district.

== Members of Parliament ==
Key

ITAK TULF

Election	Member	Party	Term
1960 (March)	V. Dharmalingam	Illankai Tamil Arasu Kachchi	1960-1960
1960 (July)	V. Dharmalingam	Illankai Tamil Arasu Kachchi	1960-1965
1965	V. Dharmalingam	Illankai Tamil Arasu Kachchi	1965-1970
1970	V. Dharmalingam	Illankai Tamil Arasu Kachchi	1970-1977
1977	V. Dharmalingam	Tamil United Liberation Front	1977-1989

== Elections ==
=== 1960 (March) Parliamentary General Election ===
Results of the 4th parliamentary election held on 19 March 1960:

Candidate	Party	Symbol	Votes	%
V. Dharmalingam	Illankai Tamil Arasu Kachchi	House	9,033	44.07%
Ponnambalam Nagalingam	Lanka Sama Samaja Party	Key	3,811	18.59%
V. Ponnampalam	Communist Party	Star	3,541	17.27%
J. D. Asservatham	Independent	Book	1,552	7.57%
S. Handy Perimbanayagam	Independent	Pair of Spectacles	1,241	6.05%
N. Sivanesan	Independent	Sun	1,008	4.92%
V. Veerasingham	Independent	Cockerel	312	1.52%
Valid Votes			20,498	100.00%
Rejected Votes			212	
Total Polled			20,710	
Registered Electors			27,278	
Turnout			75.92%	

=== 1960 (July) Parliamentary General Election ===
Results of the 5th parliamentary election held on 20 July 1960:

Candidate	Party	Symbol	Votes	%
V. Dharmalingam	Illankai Tamil Arasu Kachchi	House	11,475	63.12%
Ponnambalam Nagalingam	Lanka Sama Samaja Party	Key	6,704	36.88%
Valid Votes			18,179	100.00%
Rejected Votes			195	
Total Polled			18,374	
Registered Electors			27,278	
Turnout			67.36%	

=== 1965 Parliamentary General Election ===
Results of the 6th parliamentary election held on 22 March 1965:

Candidate	Party	Symbol	Votes	%
V. Dharmalingam	Illankai Tamil Arasu Kachchi	House	11,638	48.61%
Ponnambalam Nagalingam	Lanka Sama Samaja Party	Key	6,726	28.09%
N. Sivaneson	All Ceylon Tamil Congress	Bicycle	5,577	23.29%
Valid Votes			23,941	100.00%
Rejected Votes			287	
Total Polled			24,228	
Registered Electors			33,280	
Turnout			72.80%	

=== 1970 Parliamentary General Election ===
Results of the 7th parliamentary election held on 27 May 1970:

Candidate	Party	Symbol	Votes	%
V. Dharmalingam	Illankai Tamil Arasu Kachchi	House	14,120	49.27%
N. Sivaneson	All Ceylon Tamil Congress	Bicycle	11,656	40.68%
Kumaraswami Vinodhan	Independent	Pair of Scales	1,362	4.75%
V. Karalasingham	Lanka Sama Samaja Party	Key	1,264	4.41%
P. V. M. K. M. Sinnathurai	Independent	Umbrella	254	0.89%
Valid Votes			28,656	100.00%
Rejected Votes			119	
Total Polled			28,775	
Registered Electors			36,690	
Turnout			78.43%	

=== 1977 Parliamentary General Election ===
Results of the 8th parliamentary election held on 21 July 1977:

Candidate	Party	Symbol	Votes	%
V. Dharmalingam	Tamil United Liberation Front	Sun	27,550	83.99%
R. S. Aloysious	United National Party	Elephant	3,300	10.06%
C. P. V. M. K. Muthaliar	Independent	Umbrella	1,065	3.25%
K. N. Ratnavel	Independent	Ladder	887	2.70%
Valid Votes			32,802	100.00%
Rejected Votes			199	
Total Polled			33,001	
Registered Electors			41,373	
Turnout			79.76%	

Visvanathan Dharmalingam and all other TULF MPs boycotted Parliament from the middle of 1983 for a number of reasons: they were under pressure from Sri Lankan Tamil militants not to stay in Parliament beyond their normal six-year term; the Sixth Amendment to the Constitution of Sri Lanka required them to swear an oath unconditionally renouncing support for a separate state; and the Black July riots in which up to 3,000 Tamils were murdered by Sinhalese mobs. After three months of absence, Dharmalingam forfeited his seat in Parliament on 8 October 1983.

Visvanathan Dharmalingam was murdered on 2 September 1985.
