= S. Natesan =

Ceylonese politician (1895–1965)

Hon. Senator S. Natesan MSC MP
- சு. நடேசன்

Minister of Posts and Information
- In office 1952–1956
- Preceded by: V. Nalliah
- Succeeded by: C. A. S. Marikkar

Member of the State Council of Ceylon for Kankesanthurai
- In office 1934–1947

Member of the Ceylonese Parliament for Kankesanthurai
- In office 1952–1956
- Preceded by: S. J. V. Chelvanayakam
- Succeeded by: S. J. V. Chelvanayakam

Member of the Senate of Ceylon

Personal details
- Born: 21 May 1895
- Died: 15 January 1965 (aged 69)
- Profession: Lawyer
- Ethnicity: Indian Tamil

Subaiya Natesan (Tamil: சுப்பையா நடேசன்; also known as Subbaiya Nadesapillai; 21 May 1895 – 15 January 1965) was a Ceylonese politician, Member of State Council, Member of Parliament and senator.

== Early life and family ==
Natesan was born on 21 May 1895. He was the son of Subaiyapillai from Thanjavur, India.

Natesan married Sivagamasundari, daughter of P. Ramanathan, a leading Ceylon Tamil statesman.

== Career ==
Natesan moved to Ceylon after being invited by P. Ramanathan and in 1924 was appointed principal of Parameshwara College, Jaffna. He was also Ramanathan's private secretary.

Natesan stood as a candidate in Kankesanthurai at the 1934 state council by-elections. He won the election and entered State Council. He was re-elected at the 1936 state council election. He was one of the founding members of the United National Party (UNP) in 1946.

Natesan stood as the UNP's candidate in Kankesanthurai at the 1947 parliamentary elections but was defeated by the All Ceylon Tamil Congress (ACTC) candidate S. J. V. Chelvanayakam. However, he won the 1952 parliamentary elections and entered Parliament. He was appointed Minister of Posts and Information in the First Dudley Senanayake cabinet following the resignation of V. Nalliah. He retained his cabinet position, which was renamed Minister of Posts and Broadcasting, when the Kotelawala cabinet was formed in 1953. Natesan resigned from the government on 19 January 1956 and, like many Tamil UNP politicians, left the UNP over its support of the Sinhala Only policy. He stood for re-election in the constituency at the 1956 parliamentary election as an independent candidate but was defeated by the Illankai Tamil Arasu Kachchi (Federal Party) candidate S. J. V. Chelvanayakam.

Natesan later joined the ACTC, became its president and was appointed to the Senate of Ceylon. He was a member of the University College Council and Ceylon University Court. He was appointed to the National Education Commission in 1961. He was a Tamil scholar and historian - his works included The Northern Kingdom and Glimpses of the Early History of Jaffna. He was awarded an honorary D.Litt. degree by the University of Ceylon for his contribution to Tamil literature. He died on 15 January 1965.

== See also ==
- Ponnambalam-Coomaraswamy family
