= Varuthalaivilan =

Varuthalaivilan வருத்தலைவிளான்
- Town
- Location within Sri Lanka
- Coordinates: 9°47′0″N 80°2′0″E
- Country: Sri Lanka
- Province: Northern
- District: Jaffna
- DS Division: Valikamam North

Varuthalaivilan (Varuththalaivilan or Varuthalaivillan) (Tamil: வறுத்தலைவிளான் or வருத்தலைவிளான் or வர்த்தலைவிளான்) is a small town or village in the northern Jaffna District of Sri Lanka.

It is situated along the Vallai–Tellippalai-Arali road between Tellippalai and Kadduvan. The Varuththalaivilan village Grama Sevaka (GS) division J/241 is located in the Valikamam North Division. The village is close to the Palaly Military Base adjoining Jaffna Airport at Palaly.

During the Sri Lankan Civil War, since 1990 the village has come under the high security zone and in 1990 the village was completely evacuated by the army. The inhabitants were permitted to return to some areas in April 2015.

== History ==
The village has a traceable history of about 300 years. Maruthadi Vinayagar temple in Varuththalaivilan is about 300 years old and an Amman temple further north of the Vinayagar temple said to be even older. A pond and a large Terminalia arjuna tree (Maruthamaram) and a large banyan tree near the temple make a good landmark. The temple is highly revered by not only the people from the village but also from the people from neighboring villages.

According to word of mouth passed down by ancestors of the village, it was founded by few families about few hundred years ago and expanded into more than hundred families. Most of the families are interrelated and familiar with one another.

The village has been mainly an agricultural village but due to modern education initiated by the American Ceylon Mission in the early eighteen hundreds resulted in producing large number professionals. More details of American Ceylon mission is available at Yale University library web site.

Varuthalaivilan American Mission Tamil mixed school was established by Vinasithampy Thamppipillai in 1866 and it was functioning at the village until June 1990. The school building was located in the middle part of the village.

Varuthalaivilan youth league was kicked off in early 20th century. It owns a playground and Varuthalivilan community center which is located adjacent to cancer home but currently damaged

By the late 1970s the village had become one of the largest agricultural villages in Jaffna District and produced onion, chili, manioc, eggplant, tomato, tobacco, banana etc. Large number of Borassus (Palmyra Palm) trees (Tamil: பனை மரம்)found in the village enabled the villagers to produce toddy a beverage for the local population.

A cancer home was built at the village in 1989 in the land donated by Thampimuthu Thampirasa. It is about one kilo-meter east of Tellippalai Hospital or Tellippalai Base Hospital.

Being in the high security zone for 25 years, the village had become a jungle area, cancer home ruins and the pond near the temple were the only landmarks visible in the Google satellite map until it was released to the owners in April 2015.

In March 2015 Cabinet of Sri Lanka decided to release 400 acres in Palai Veemankamam south and Varuthalaivilan, 300 acres in Kadduvan and Kurumbasiddy for re-settlement After about 25 years of abandonment, almost all the houses were damaged. Most houses were without any wooden fittings including the roof and some houses are totally ruined. The area was covered with bushes and trees. Since then the bushes are being cleared and the temple is being rebuilt. Some lands still contain land mines and are being cleared slowly.

=== Sri Lankan Civil War ===
Key events of the Sri Lankan Civil War involving the village were, in reverse chronological order:

April 2015, Part of the village was released to its original residents after 25 years.

Oct 1990, all the people from the village got displaced as the Sri Lanka Army advanced from Palaly Military Base and captured surrounding areas including Varuthalaivilan. Four women could not leave the village as they were too old. Two of the women died later in the village due to lack of medical facilities and two of them came out of the village with the help of ICRC.

June 1990, hostilities broke out between Liberation Tigers of Tamil Eelam (LTTE) and Sri Lanka Army. Intermittent shelling, firing and grenade dropping from helicopters against LTTE positions affected the village resulting in displacement of half the population.

March 1990, Indian Peace Keeping Force (IPKF) withdrew from the village as they withdrew from North Eastern Province, Sri Lanka.

Oct 1987, hostilities broke out between IPKF and LTTE resulted in village came under IPKF control consequently the village was cut off from rest of the Jaffna peninsula. In the battle to take control of Jaffna town twelve people belonged to the village were killed elsewhere in Jaffna Peninsula.

August 1987, IPKF lands in Jaffna Airport at Palaly and moved into the village.

July 1987, Indo-Sri Lanka Accord was signed and Sri Lanka Army withdrew from the village and people from the village return to the village after about two month displacement.

May–June 1987, Sri Lanka Army advanced from Palaly military base and captured the village resulting in total displacement of the villagers except one family.

Early 1985, Sri Lanka Army tried to advance to Tellippalai town from the Palaly military base resulting in three people shot and killed in the village. The army return to the base due to resistance from Tamil rebels.

Nov 19 1984, Brigadier Ariyapperuma got killed in a mine explosion on the Vallai-Tellipalai-Araly road near the village resulting in five houses burnt down in the village in retaliation.

July 1983, Black July violence against Tamils resulted in number of families from the village who were living outside North Eastern Province, Sri Lanka lost their properties. One person died at Colombo General Hospital.

Oct 1981, after a bank robbery at Killinochi by People's Liberation Organisation of Tamil Eelam (PLOTE), its leader Uma Maheswaran’s parents house at the village was burnt in retaliation.

== Gallery ==
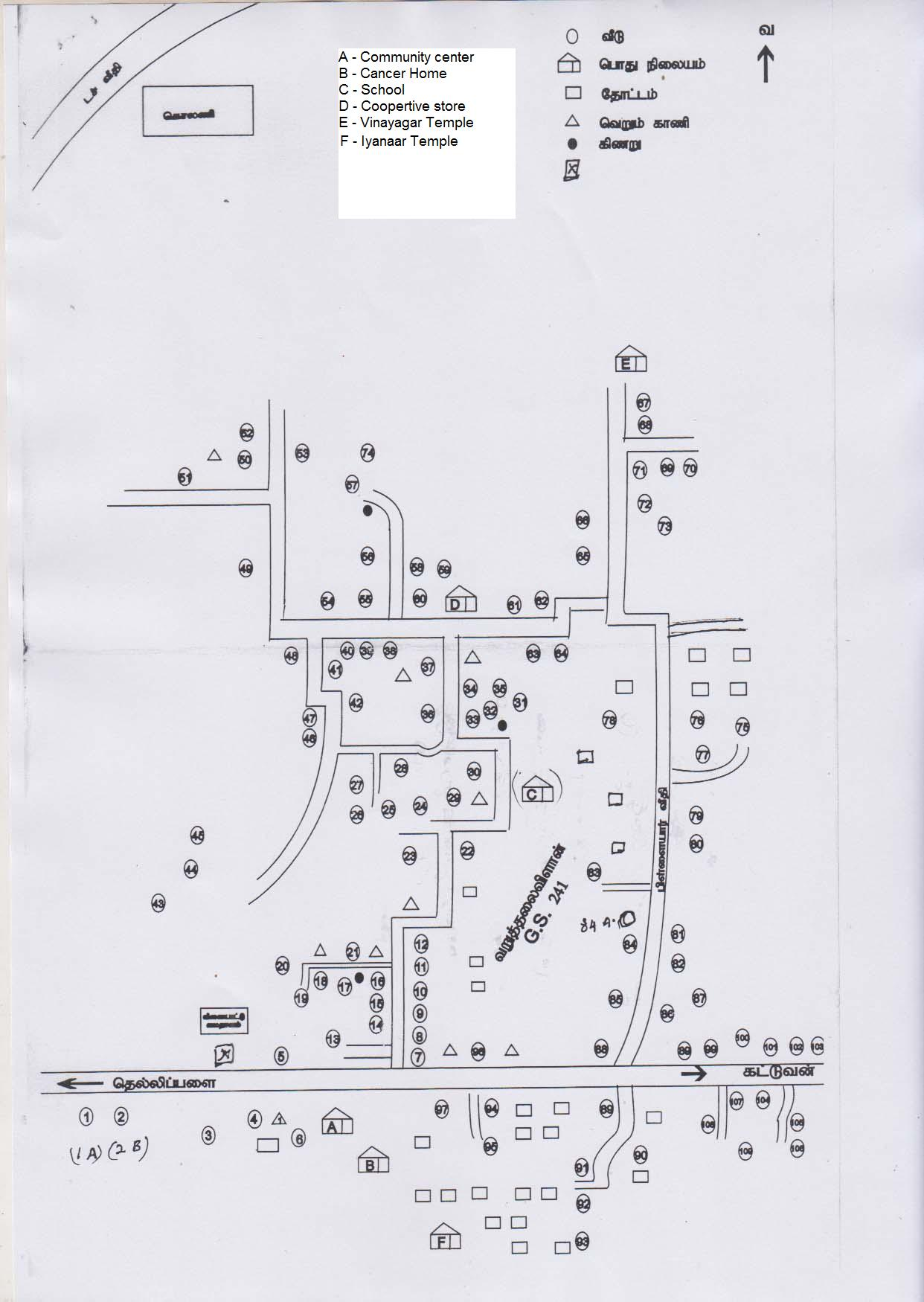
Varuthalivilan map before civil war showing houses in one part of the village

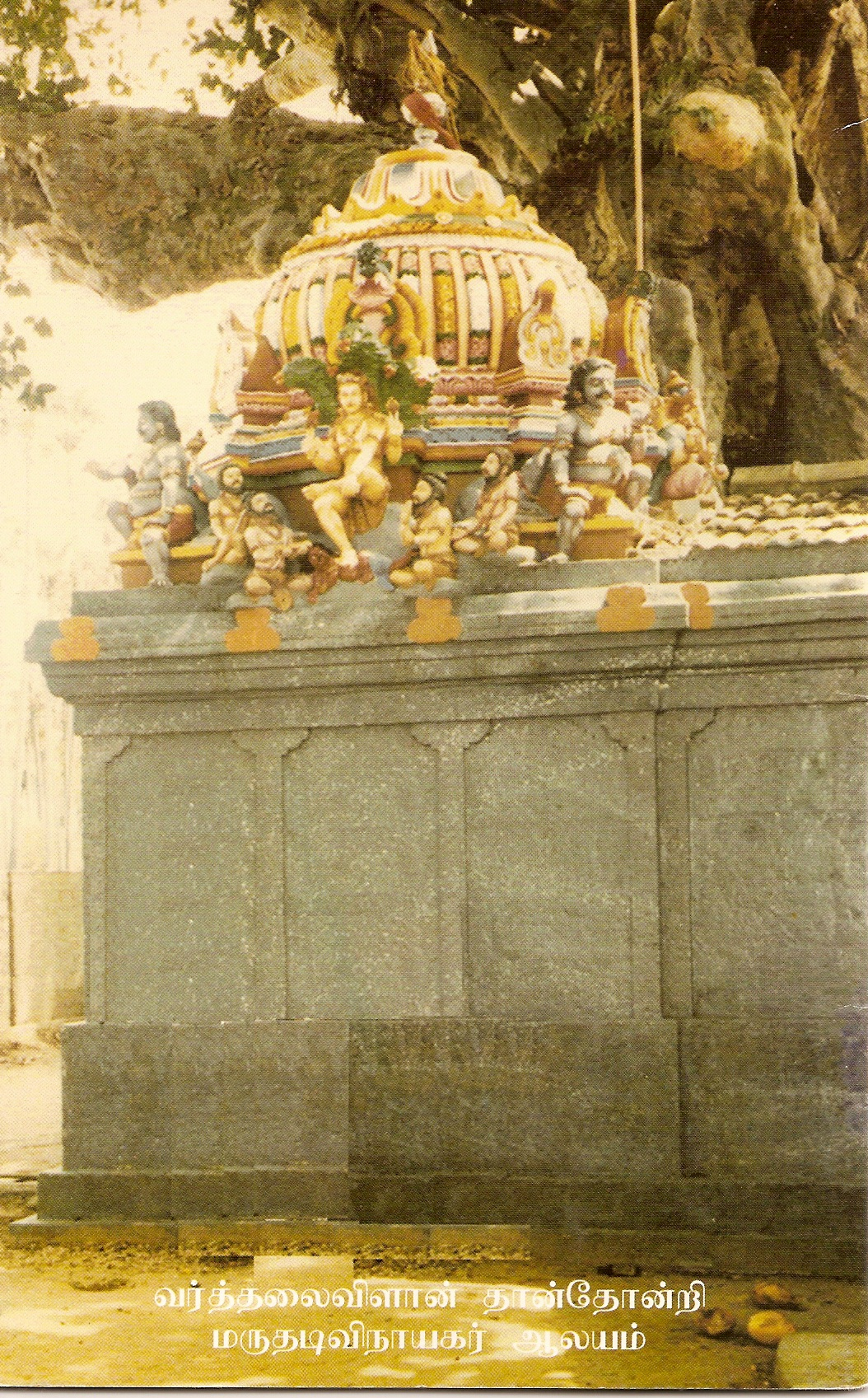
Varuthalaivilan maruthadi vinayagar temple in 1989

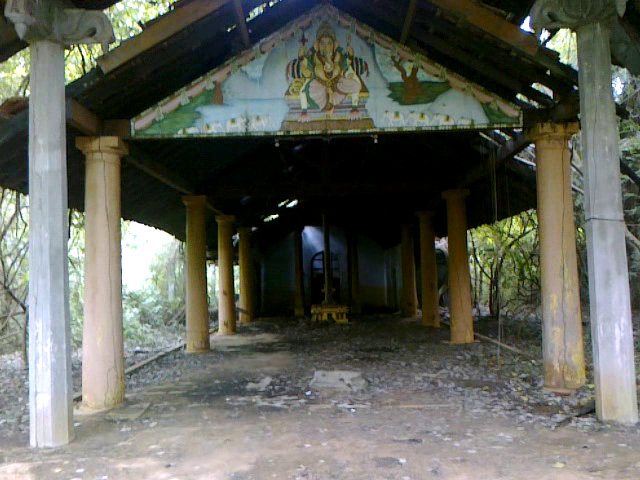
Varuthalaivilan Maruthadi Vinayagar Temple front in 2009

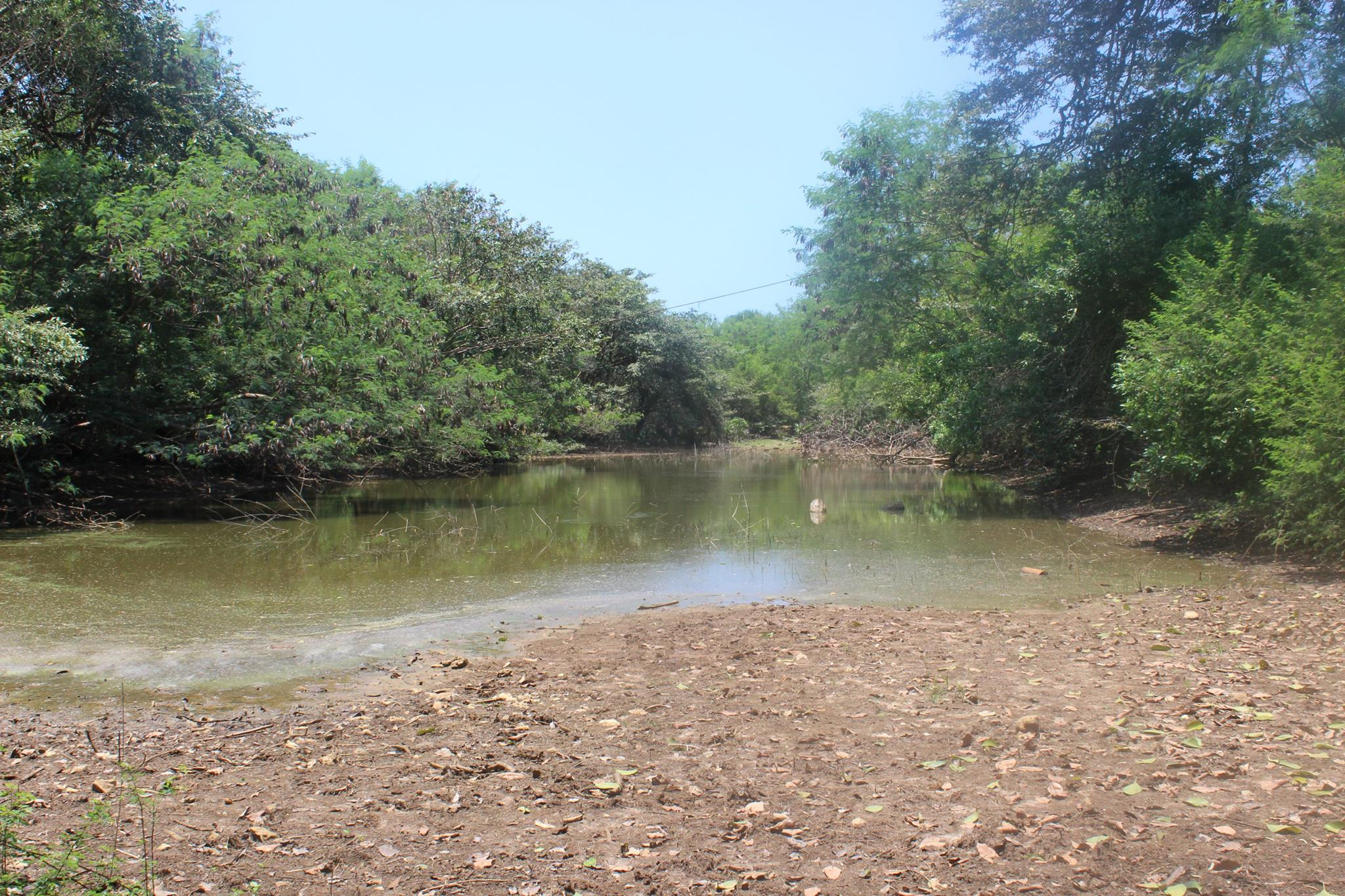
Varuthalaivilan Maruthadi Vinayagar Temple Pond in April 2015

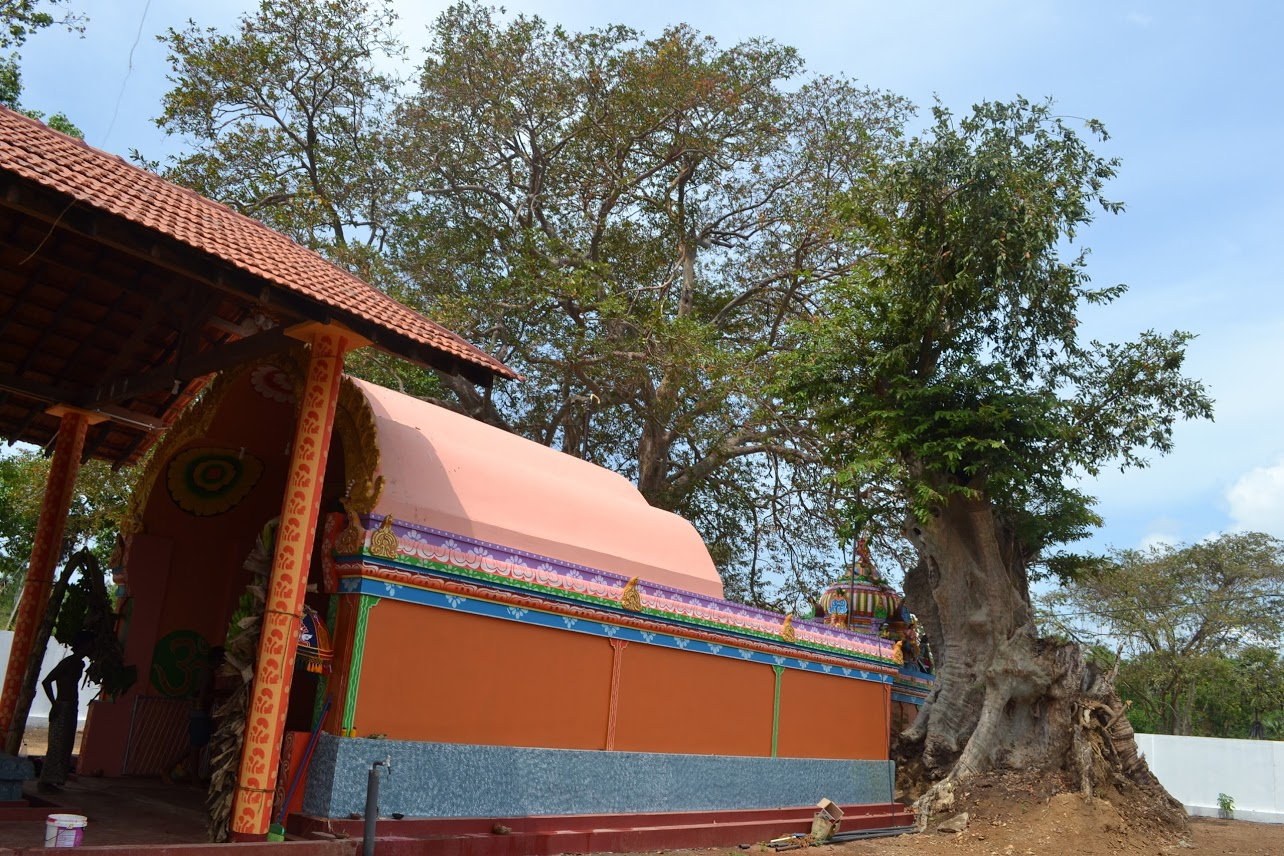
Rebuilt Varuthalaivilan Maruthadi Vinayagar Temple, April 2016

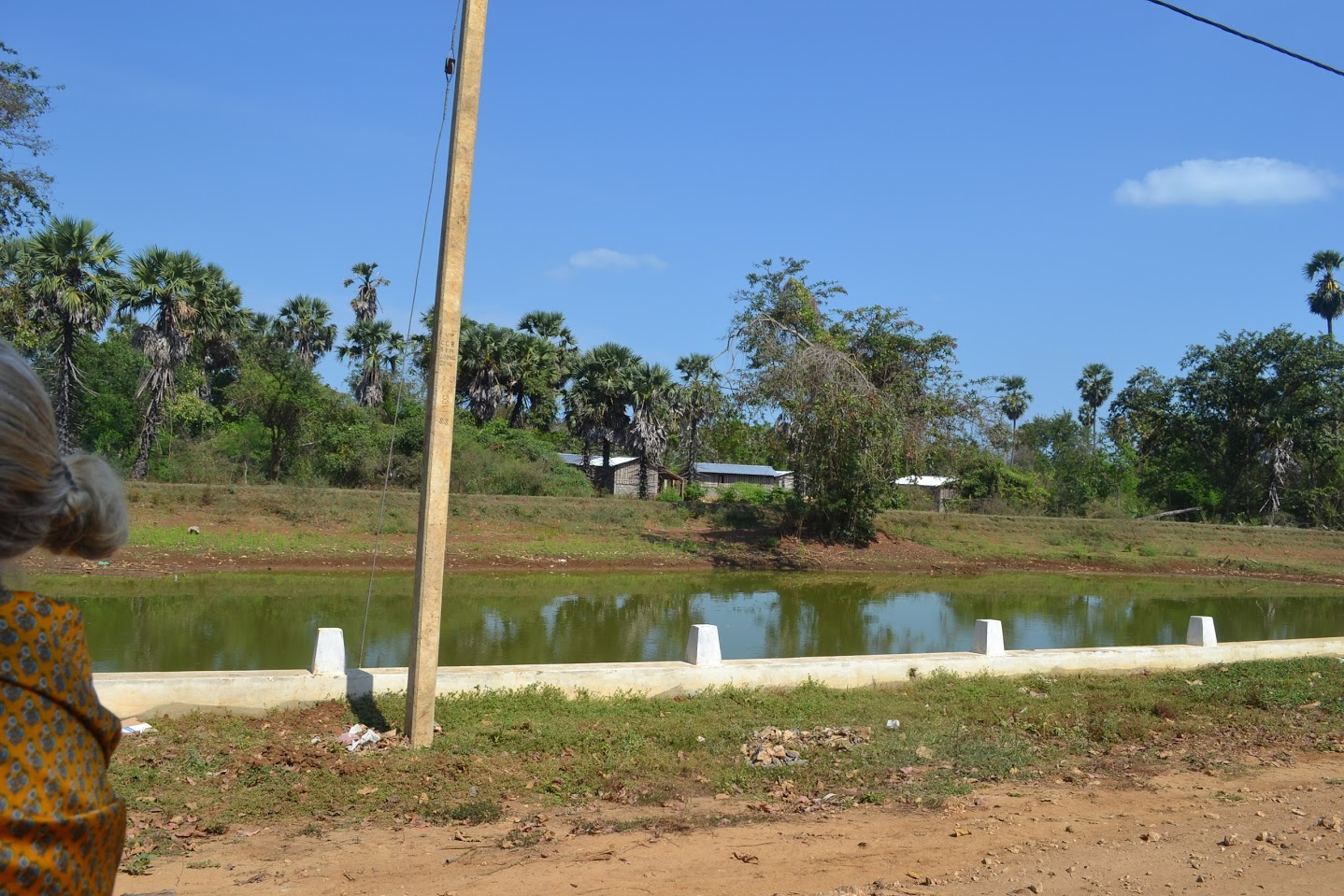
Varuthalaivilan Maruthadi Vinayagar Temple Pond view, April 2016

== Notable people ==
Vidwa Siromani C. Ganesha Iyer, a famous Tamil scholar served as the priest at the Maruthadi Vinayagar Temple during the middle part of the 20th century. One of his famous works is his interpretation of old Tamil literature.

Prof. P. Selvanayagam First person from the village obtained PhD(Engineering).

Dr S. Sivalingam Second person from the village obtained PhD (Fisheries).
