= Lanka Sama Samaja Party (Revolutionary) =

Lanka Equal Society Party (Revolutionary) Lanka Sama Samaja Party (Revolutionary)
- Founded: 1964
- Split from: Lanka Sama Samaja Party
- Newspaper: Fight, Samasamajist
- Ideology: Communism; Trotskyism
- Political position: Far-left
- International affiliation: Fourth International
- Colors: Red

Lanka Sama Samaja Party (Revolutionary) was a Trotskyist political party in Sri Lanka, formed in 1964 when the Lanka Sama Samaja Party was expelled from the Fourth International. LSSP(R) was constituted by the ideological hardliners who opposed LSSP joining the national government and wanted to preserve the bonds to the Fourth International. The United Secretariat recognised it as the Sri Lanka section of the Fourth International.

The founders of LSSP(R) had 14 LSSP Central Committee members, and two members of parliament, Edmund Samarakkody and Meryl Fernando. Other significant leaders were V. Karalasingham and P. Bala Tampoe.

LSSP(R) later disintegrated in internal strife. A source of discontent was the issue of parliamentary tactics. On December 3, 1964, the parliamentary fraction of LSSP(R) voted alongside the right-wing United National Party and dissidents of the Sri Lanka Freedom Party for an amendment to second throne speech of the SLFP-led government. The amendment was passed and the government defeated. The action of the LSSP(R) parliamentarians made V. Karalasingham and the Sakthi fraction leave LSSP(R) and return to the LSSP.

In 1966 Samarakkody started a left opposition against Bala Tampoe and the rest of the leadership. Samarakkody and his supporters left the LSSP(R) following a Special Conference (18–19 April 1968) and formed the Revolutionary Samasamaja Party. The 1969 World Congress of the Fourth International appointed a Ceylon Commission to discuss with both Samarakkody's group and the LSSP (R), but was unable to resolve the differences.

A Healyite splinter group, formed amongst students in 1968, is now called the Socialist Equality Party.

LSSP(R) published Fight (around 1966) and Samasamajist (1968-1970) in English.
