= Vidyananda College =

- வித்தியானந்தக் கல்லூரி

Location
- Mulliyawalai, Mullaitivu District, Northern Province; Sri Lanka
- Coordinates: 9°13′27.20″N 80°46′56.90″E

Information
- School type: National School
- Motto: Learning to purity
- Founded: 1951
- Founder: C. Suntharalingam
- School district: Mullaitivu Education Zone
- Authority: Central government of Sri Lanka
- School number: 1401002
- Teaching staff: 29
- Grades: 6-13
- Gender: Mixed
- Age range: 10-18

Vidyananda College (Tamil: வித்தியானந்தக் கல்லூரி Vittiyāṉantak Kallūri) is a National school in Mulliyawalai, Sri Lanka. Established in 1951, it was the first school in Mullaitivu District to achieve "college" status.

== History ==
Vidyananda College was founded in 1951 by C. Suntharalingam, the local Member of Parliament. It is located on grounds of about 27 acres (110,000 m^{2}). The school was affected by the Sri Lankan Civil War, being located in the eastern Mullaitivu District where battles occurred during the civil war which resulted in the deaths of thousands of civilians. School girls studying in this school were among those killed in the Chencholai bombing.

== See also ==
- List of schools in Northern Province, Sri Lanka
