= C. Ganesha Iyer =

Ceylonese Tamil philologist

Vidhva Shiromani C. Ganesha Iyer சி. கணேசையர்
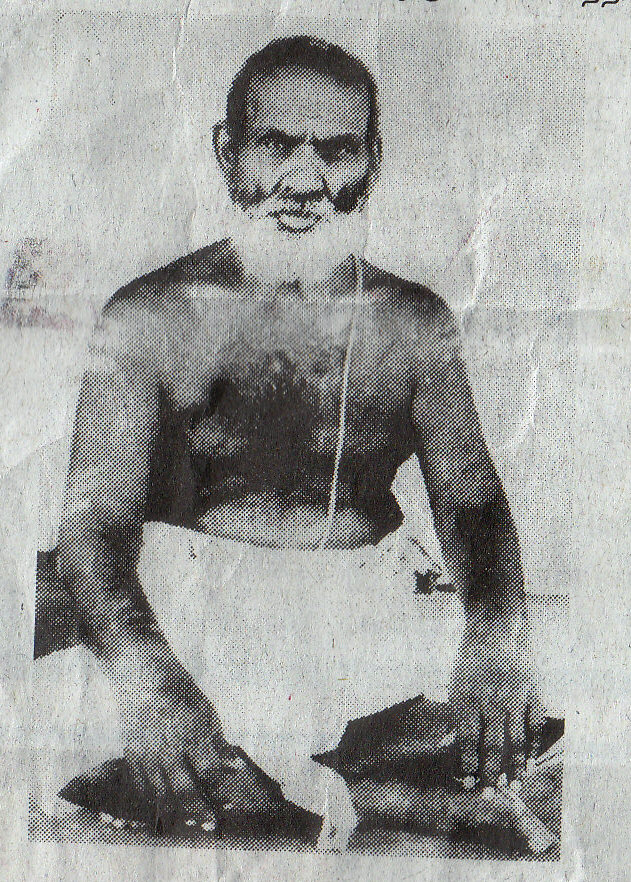
- Born: C. Ganesha Iyer; 1 April 1878; Punnalaikadduvan, Jaffna, Ceylon
- Died: 8 November 1958 (aged 80); Varuthalai Vilan, Jaffna, Ceylon (present-day , Sri Lanka)
- Spouse: Annalakshmi
- Parent(s): Chinnaiyar; Chinnammal

Vidhva Shiromani Brahma Sri C. Ganesha Iyer (1 April 1878 – 8 November 1958) was a Ceylonese Tamil philologist from Jaffna.

== Early years ==
Iyer was the fifth son of Chinnaiyar and Chinnammal, born in the agricultural village of Punnalaikkadduvan, 12 kilometers north of Jaffna city. His family consisted of learned and teachers. Iyer had his primary education (up to 8th standard) in a Saiva school started by Kathirgama iyer in the courtyard of Siththi Vinayagar Temple and was a Teacher at the same school later on.

This school was taken over by the Govt. and is in the opposite side of Aayakkadavai Sithivinayagar Temple. He ranked first in Tamil grammar, literature, history, religion and mathematics. The private tuition he received at home from his uncle, Kathirgama Iyer, enabled him to achieve the first rank in school. After the death of Ponnambala Pillai, Ganesha Iyer was a student under Chunnakam Kumaraswamy Pulavar for some time. He learned Tamil Grammar and Sanskrit from the Pulavar. Ganesha Iyer grew up a scholar by referring his doubts to Kumarasamy Pulavar and getting clarifications from him.

== Family life ==
Iyer married Annalakshmi – the only daughter of his maternal uncle. Annalakshmi had good knowledge in Sanskrit and Tamil. The couple did not have any children. After the death of his wife, Ganesha Iyer bought a land and dug a well in memoriam to his wife, which he named "Annalakshmi Koopam" and donated it to the Maruthady Vinayagar temple at Varuthalaivilan.

== Grammatical and literary activities ==
Iyer had a matured proficiency in grammar. He wrote explanatory notes to the ancient Tamil literature called Tolkāppiyam that is considered as the maxim for Tamil grammar. This work took him to the crest of popularity. For several years he went in search of the palm-leaf manuscripts of Tholkapiyam, collected them and took notes from them. Whenever he found any error, he corrected them, published the corrections in newspapers and got the approval of other scholars. After finalising everything he published a book, edited and published by Eezhakesari Naa of Ponniah. The following books were published Ezhuththathikaram (1937), Sollathikaram (1938), Porulathikaram, 1st and 2nd parts (1943/1948).

== Teacher ==
He served as a teacher in several schools in Jaffna. He was a certified teacher to teach in government schools. He was the Principal of Praseena Paatasala at Chunnakam established by Muhandiram T. Sathasiva Iyer from the year 1921 till 1932. During this period he created a lineage of eminent Pandithars in Eelam. After leaving this school, he held private classes in Varuthalaivilan. He taught grammar to teachers and others who came from various parts of the Jaffna Peninsula. Every evening he conducted a class under the banyan tree in the vicinity of Maruthady Vinayagar temple at Varuthalaivilan.

== Final years ==
Iyer spent the last ten years of his life at Varuthalaivilan. He died on 3 November 1958.
