= Mulliyawalai =

Mulliyawalai முள்ளியவளை මුල්ලියවල
- Town
- Location of Mulliyawalai in the Northern Province
- Coordinates: 9°13′14″N 80°46′47″E
- Country: Sri Lanka
- Province: Northern
- District: Mullaitivu
- DS Division: Maritimepattu

Population (2012)
  - Total: 4,647

Mulliyawalai or Mulliyavalai (Tamil: முள்ளியவளை, romanized: Muḷḷiyavaḷai) is a town in northern Sri Lanka. It is divided into five village officer divisions: Mulliyawalai Centre, Mulliyawalai East, Mulliyawalai North, Mulliyawalai South, and Mulliyawalai West. According to the 2012 census, it has a total population of 4,647.

== Education ==
The schools in the Mulliyawalai area are:

1. Mulliyawalai Tamil Vidyalayam
2. Mu/Kalaimahal Vidyalayam
3. Vidyananda College (Mu/Vidyananda College-National School) founded by C. Suntharalingam
4. Mu/Thanneeruttu Hindu Board Tamil Mixed School
5. THANNIROOTTU .C.C.T.M.S
6. M/Thanneeroottu Muslim Maha Viddiyalayam (மு/தண்ணீருற்று முஸ்லிம் மகா வித்தியாலம்,முள்ளியவளை)
7. Mu/Mulliyavalai RCTMS

== Religion ==
Greater Mulliyawalai has several ancient temples and historical sites.

=== Temples ===
1. Kattavinayagar Temple
2. Kalyanavelavar Alayam
3. Santhiamman Temple (சந்தியம்மன் கோவில்)
4. Uttankarai Sithi Vinayagar Temple (ஊற்றங்கரை சித்தி விநாயகர் ஆலயம்)
5. St. Matthias' Church
6. Mamoolai Krishna Temple
7. Shree Chithra Velayuthar Temple
8. Kanukkeni Karpapa Pillayar Temple (கணுக்கேணி கற்பகப் பிள்ளையார் ஆலயம்)
9. Mulliyawalai Church (முள்ளியவளை தேவாலயம்)
10. Jumma Mosque
11. Tanniyuttu Grand Jumma Mosque
12. Puthanvayal Nagathampiran Alayam
13. Iyanar Kovil Mulliyawalai
14. Mamoolai St.Antony's church
15. Sai Ashramam Mulliyawalai
16. Mizpah Prayer Missionary Ministry Mulliyawalai
17. Narasingar Kovil Mulliyawalai

== Notable residents ==
- Akila Thirunayaki, athlete
