= Thavady =

Thavady தாவடி තාවඩි
- Village
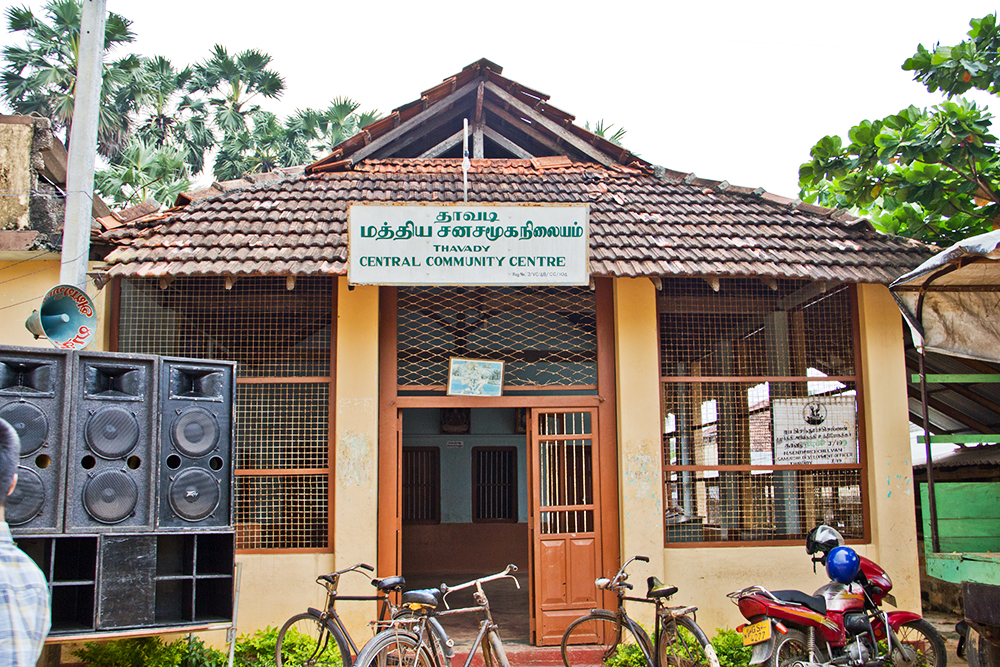
- Thaavady Community Centre

- Location within Sri Lanka
- Coordinates: 9°42′31.15″N 80°01′00.66″E
- Country: Sri Lanka
- Province: Northern
- District: Jaffna
- DS Division: Valikamam South

Thavady (Tamil: தாவடி, Sinhala: තාවඩි) is a small village in Jaffna, Chunnakam, in Northern Sri Lanka. The area is populated by people who speak Tamil.

== Education ==
- Thavady School.

== Temples ==
- Thavady Vinayahar Kovil
- Thavady vada paththira Kali

amman kovil

- Thavady Kali Kovil

== See also ==
- Jaffna
