= V. Dharmalingam =

20th-century Sri Lankan Tamil politician

Hon. V. Dharmalingam
- வி. தர்மலிங்கம் විශ්වනාදර් ධර්මලිංගම්

Member of the Ceylonese Parliament for Uduvil / Manipay
- In office 1960–1983

Personal details
- Born: 5 February 1918
- Died: 2 September 1985 (aged 67) Thavady, Sri Lanka
- Party: Illankai Tamil Arasu Kachchi
- Other political affiliations: Tamil United Liberation Front
- Children: D. Siddhartan
- Ethnicity: Sri Lankan Tamil

Visvanathan Dharmalingam (Tamil: விஸ்வநாதர் தர்மலிங்கம்; 5 February 1918 – 2 September 1985) was a Sri Lankan Tamil politician and Member of Parliament.

== Early life and family ==
Dharmalingam was born on 5 February 1918. He was educated at Skandavarodaya College, Chunnakam, and St Patrick's College, Jaffna. He later entered Ceylon Law College but gave up his legal studies to enter politics.

Dharmalingam's son Siddhartan is the leader of the People's Liberation Organisation of Tamil Eelam (PLOTE), a pro-government paramilitary group and political party.

== Career ==
Dharmalingam was elected to Uduvil Village Council in 1944, later becoming its chairman. Although a leftist he joined the Illankai Tamil Arasu Kachchi (Federal Party). He stood as the ITAK candidate in Uduvil at the March 1960 parliamentary election. He won the election and entered Parliament. He was re-elected at the July 1960, March 1965 and May 1970 parliamentary elections.

Dharmalingam played a leading role in the 1961 satyagraha campaign organised by ITAK. Early on the morning of 20 February 1961 a group of 55 to 75 persons staged a satyagraha at the Jaffna Kachcheri in Old Park. Among them were ITAK MPs A. Amirthalingam, S. J. V. Chelvanayakam, Dharmalingam, V. A. Kandiah, E. M. V. Naganathan, V. N. Navaratnam and K. Thurairatnam. A large group of policemen arrived in riot gear, wearing helmets and carrying batons and shields. The police started removing the protesters by lifting and carrying them away. Those who resisted were dragged away. Later, as Government Agent M. Srikantha and Superintendent of Police Richard Arndt tried to leave Old Park in a jeep the protesters blocked their way. The police reacted with brutality, beating the protesters with batons and pulling them aside to clear the way. Palaniyappan, a young man who had thrown himself in front of the jeep was pulled away by the police and beaten severely with batons. Five ITAK MPs were amongst the protesters blocking the jeep. Kandiah was carried out and dumped on the ground, Dharmalingam and Thurairatnam were dragged out by their hands and legs whilst Amirthalingam and Naganathan were baton charged. The police also baton charged a crowd of around 5,000 who had gathered to watch the satyagraha.

On 14 May 1972 the ITAK, All Ceylon Tamil Congress, Ceylon Workers' Congress, Eelath Thamilar Otrumai Munnani and All Ceylon Tamil Conference formed the Tamil United Front, later renamed Tamil United Liberation Front (TULF). Dharmalingam was the TULF's candidate in Manipay (the new name of the Uduvil electoral district) at the 1977 parliamentary election and was re-elected. Dharmalingam and all other TULF MPs boycotted Parliament from the middle of 1983 for a number of reasons: they were under pressure from Sri Lankan Tamil militants not to stay in Parliament beyond their normal six-year term; the Sixth Amendment to the Constitution of Sri Lanka required them to swear an oath unconditionally renouncing support for a separate state; and the Black July riots in which up to 3,000 Tamils were murdered by Sinhalese mobs. After three months of absence, Dharmalingam forfeited his seat in Parliament on 8 October 1983.

=== Assassination ===
On the night of 2/3 September 1985 two men went to the house of M. Alalasundaram, former MP for Kopay, at Kalliyankadu, Nallur and kidnapped him at gun point. They took Alalasundaram in a car and drove to Uduvil where Dharmalingam was attending a wedding. The men then kidnapped Dharmalingam as well. The next day Alalasundaram's body was found in a scrub jungle near his home at Kalliyankadu with bullet wounds in the chest and arm. Dharmalingam's body was found at a cemetery in Thavady, Manipay, with a bullet wound in the forehead.

No one claimed responsibility for the assassinations. Dharmalingam's son Siddhartan, who is a member of the PLOTE militant group, blamed one of the members of Eelam National Liberation Front for the assassinations (PLOTE wasn't a member of ENLF). It is widely believed that the murders were carried out by Tamil Eelam Liberation Organization (TELO), an Indian backed militant group, on the orders of the Research and Analysis Wing, the Indian intelligence agency. Alalasundaram was close to the TELO and a relative of its leader Sri Sabaratnam. It is believed that TELO chose to murder Alalasundaram at the same time as Dharmalingam so as to avoid suspicion. According to Siddhartan and K. T. Rajasingham the TELO assassins had been led by Bobby but others claim that it was Das.

However, the Sri Lankan government and the military, without any valid proof, have repeatedly blamed the Liberation Tigers of Tamil Eelam (LTTE) for the assassinations.

== See also ==
- List of assassinations of the Sri Lankan Civil War
