= S. J. V. Chelvanayakam =

Sri Lankan politician (1898–1977)

The Honourable S. J. V. Chelvanayakam MP
- சா. ஜே. வே. செல்வநாயகம்

Member of the Ceylonese Parliament for Kankesanthurai
- In office 1947–1952
- Succeeded by: S. Natesan
- In office 1956–1977
- Preceded by: S. Natesan
- Succeeded by: A. Amirthalingam

Personal details
- Born: 31 March 1898 Ipoh, Malaya
- Died: 26 April 1977 (aged 79)
- Party: Illankai Tamil Arasu Kachchi
- Other political affiliations: Tamil United Liberation Front
- Spouse: Emily Grace Barr-Kumarakulasinghe
- Education: Ceylon Law College
- Profession: Lawyer

Samuel James Veluppillai Chelvanayakam MP (Tamil: சாமுவேல் ஜேம்ஸ் வேலுப்பிள்ளை செல்வநாயகம், romanized: Cāmuvēl Jēms Vēluppiḷḷai Celvanāyakam; 31 March 1898 – 26 April 1977) was a Ceylonese lawyer, politician and Member of Parliament. He was the founder and leader of the Illankai Tamil Arasu Kachchi (ITAK) and Tamil United Liberation Front (TULF) and a political leader of the Ceylon Tamil community for more than two decades. Chelvanayakam has been described as a father figure to Ceylon's Tamils, to whom he was known as "Thanthai Chelva" (father Chelva).

Born into an expatriate Ceylon Tamil family in Malaya, Chelvanayakam moved to Ceylon while still young. He worked as a teacher before studying law at Ceylon Law College and qualifying as lawyer. A successful career in civil law saw him becoming a King's Counsel and being offered a position on the Supreme Court, which he rejected. As a young lawyer Chelvanayakam was not involved in politics but when the British established the Soulbury Commission to look into constitutional reform in Ceylon he and other Tamil people formed the All Ceylon Tamil Congress (ACTC) to represent Tamil interests. He was elected to Parliament in 1947 to represent Kankesanthurai, a constituency he would represent until his death, except for a period between 1952 and 1956. Chelvanayakam left the ACTC over the party's decision to join the government and in 1949 founded his own party, ITAK, also known as the Federal Party.

Chelvanayakam and ITAK advocated federalism as a means of sharing power between Ceylon's majority Sinhalese and minority Tamils. Chelvanayakam signed two pacts with Ceylonese prime ministers—Bandaranaike–Chelvanayakam Pact (1957) and Dudley-Chelvanayakam Pact (1965)—on devolving powers to Tamils and resolving linguistic rights and other ethnic issues but both were abrogated by the prime ministers due to pressure from Sinhalese nationalists. This, together with government policies which were regarded by Ceylon's minorities as discriminatory, resulted in Chelvanayakam and the Tamil political movement shifting away from federalism and towards separatism. ITAK and other Tamil political groups formed the Tamil United Front (TUF) in 1972 with Chelvanayakam as its leader. TUF was renamed TULF and in 1976, at a convention presided over by Chelvanayakam, passed the Vaddukoddai Resolution calling for the "restoration and reconstitution of the free, sovereign, secular, socialist state of Tamil Eelam".

Chelvanayakam suffered from Parkinson's disease and failing hearing. He died in 1977 aged 79 after a fall at his home. Noted for his integrity, Chelvanayakam was committed to using non-violent methods to achieve his political goals, and led several satyagraha campaigns to realise the Tamils' political demands. His methods, however, failed to secure Tamils' rights in the face of opposition from Sinhalese Buddhist nationalists. His belief that the Tamils' political aspirations could be achieved through parliamentary institutions has been criticised as naive. With his death the era of non-violent protest was replaced by violent militancy.

== Early life and family ==
Chelvanayakam was born on 31 March 1898 in Ipoh, Malaya. He was the son of Visvanathan Velupillai, a businessman, and Harriet Annamma Kanapathipillai. Velupillai had been a school teacher in Tholpuram in northern Ceylon before migrating to Malaya as a contractor. Chelvanayakam had two brothers (Ernest Velupillai Ponnuthurai and Edward Rajasundaram) and a sister (Atputham Isabel). The family later moved from Ipoh to Taiping.

Malaya had few schools and most of these catered for rich Malays. It was common for expatriate Ceylon Tamils to send their children to schools in Ceylon. Aged four, Chelvanayakam, his mother, sister and two brothers were sent to Ceylon for the children's schooling. (Note: According to another source Chelvanayakam's sister died aged two, before the family went to Tellippalai.) Velupillai remained in Malaya to provide for his family. The family lived in Tellippalai, Harriet's home town, close to Harriet's siblings and their families. Harriet's brother S. K. Ponniah, a Church of England minister, became Chelvanayakam's guide and adviser.

Chelvanayakam was educated at Union College, Tellippalai and St. John's College, Jaffna. (Note: Leading schools in colonial Ceylon were called "colleges".) After school he joined S. Thomas' College, Mutwal and obtained an external degree in science from the University of London in 1918. At St. Thomas Chelvanayakam was a contemporary of S. W. R. D. Bandaranaike, future Prime Minister of Ceylon. After graduation Chelvanayakam visited his father in Malaya in 1918 (Note: Another sources states that Chelvanayakam visited his father in 1922.) shortly before his death.

Chelvanayakam married Emily Grace Barr-Kumarakulasinghe (Rathinam), daughter of R. R. Barr-Kumarakulasinghe, in 1927. The Barr-Kumarakulasinghes were an influential family from Tellippalai who served the Dutch and British administrations in Ceylon. R. R. Barr-Kumarakulasinghe was Maniagar (British appointed administrative chief) for the Valikamam region. The Chelvanayakams had four sons (Manoharan, Vaseekaran, Ravindran and Chandrahasan) and a daughter (Susila).

Chelvanayakam was a Protestant Christian and a member of the Church of South India (CSI). While studying in Colombo he became a member of the Church of England as the CSI had no presence in the capital. Later, when the CSI established a church in Colombo, Chelvanayakam worshipped there. Though a Christian, Chelvanayakam absorbed many of the values of Hinduism, claiming to be a Christian by religion and a Hindu by culture.

== Education, law and business ==
After graduating Chelvanayakam started teaching at St. Thomas but resigned when the warden William Arthur Stone refused him leave to visit his dying brother Edward Rajasundaram. He then joined Wesley College, Colombo as chief science (Note: Another sources states Chelvanayakam taught mathematics at Wesley College and was head of the science department.) master. During this period he studied law at Ceylon Law College and became an advocate of the Supreme Court in 1923. He started practising law in Hulftsdorp, specialising in civil law, and was made a King's Counsel on 31 May 1947. Chelvanayakam was twice offered a position on the Supreme Court by Chief Justice John Curtois Howard.

Chelvanayakam was part of a syndicate which purchased a controlling stake in the Pettiagalla Estate plantation in Balangoda. He also owned a printing press which, though not profitable, was used to print ITAK's newspaper Suthanthiran (Freedom).

== Political career ==
=== All Ceylon Tamil Congress ===
With the annexation of the Kingdom of Kandy in 1815 the British brought the whole island of Ceylon under their control and in 1829 appointed the Colebrooke–Cameron Commission to assess the administration of the island. Among the recommendations of the commission were the end of the separate administration along ethnic/cultural lines for Low Country Sinhalese, Kandyan Sinhalese and Tamils and the introduction of communal representation whereby Ceylonese members of the Legislative Council were appointed along ethnic lines. The Donoughmore Commission of 1931 introduced universal suffrage and replaced communal representation with territorial representation, thereby introducing majority (Sinhalese) rule. Following the 1936 state council election an all-Sinhalese Board of Ministers was established, stoking fears amongst the island's minorities about Sinhalese domination. Ceylon's Tamils, led by G. G. Ponnambalam, responded by demanding balanced representation (half of seats in legislature for Sinhalese with the remaining half for the combined minorities). When the British appointed Soulbury Commission to look into constitutional reform in 1944, Ceylon's Tamils formed the All Ceylon Tamil Congress (ACTC) to represent Tamil interests.

As a young lawyer Chelvanayakam was not involved in politics but when the ACTC was established in 1944 he became one of its principal organisers. Ponnambalam was the ACTC's president and Chelvanayakam was effectively his deputy. Chelvanayakam was part of the delegation, led by Ponnambalam, to the Soulbury Commission which argued unsuccessfully for balanced representation. Chelvanayakam stood as the ACTC candidate for Kankesanthurai in the 1947 parliamentary election. He won the election and entered Parliament.

In the 19th and 20th centuries the British recruited large numbers of South Indians, primarily Indian Tamils, to work in tea, coffee, rubber and coconut plantations in Ceylon. Ceylon's majority Sinhalese viewed Indian Tamils with deep suspicion, fearing that they would dominate the island's central highlands and ally themselves with the indigenous Ceylon Tamils, increasing the latter's political strength. Following independence from Britain in February 1948, Ceylon's Sinhalese dominated government introduced the Ceylon Citizenship Bill which had the effect of denying citizenship and making stateless the country's Indian Tamils, who by now accounted for 11 per cent of the population. The bill provided for citizenship by descent or registration but both required documentary proof, something that was difficult for most Indian Tamils, many of whom were illiterate. The ACTC opposed the bill which was passed by Parliament at its second reading on 20 August 1948. Shortly afterwards Ponnambalam decided to join the United National Party (UNP) led government which caused a split in the ACTC. Eventually the ACTC dissidents, led by Chelvanayakam, E. M. V. Naganathan and C. Vanniasingam formed the Illankai Tamil Arasu Kachchi (ITAK, Federal Party) on 18 December 1949.

=== Illankai Tamil Arasu Kachchi ===
ITAK had four main aims: creation of a federal union in Ceylon with two states — a Tamil state in the Northern and Eastern provinces and a Sinhalese state in the remaining seven provinces; cessation of state-sponsored colonisation in the two Tamil provinces; unity amongst the Tamil speaking peoples of Ceylon—Ceylon Tamils, Indian Tamils and Muslims; and equal status for Sinhala and Tamil languages. Chelvanayakam lost his seat in the 1952 parliamentary election but regained it in the 1956 parliamentary election. As Ceylon's two main parties, the UNP and Sri Lanka Freedom Party (SLFP), introduced policies which further discriminated against the country's minorities, such as the Sinhala Only Act which made the Sinhala language the sole official language of Ceylon, ITAK's Tamil nationalism became more popular than the ACTC's conservatism. In the 1956 parliamentary election the ITAK overtook the ACTC as the most popular party amongst Ceylon Tamils. On 5 June 1956 a group of Tamil activists and parliamentarians, led by Chelvanayakam, staged a satyagraha (a form of non-violent resistance) against the Sinhala Only Act on Galle Face Green opposite the Parliament. The satyagrahis were attacked by a Sinhalese mob as the police looked on, and ITAK MPs E. M. V. Naganathan and V. N. Navaratnam were thrown in Beira Lake.

=== Bandaranaike–Chelvanayakam Pact ===
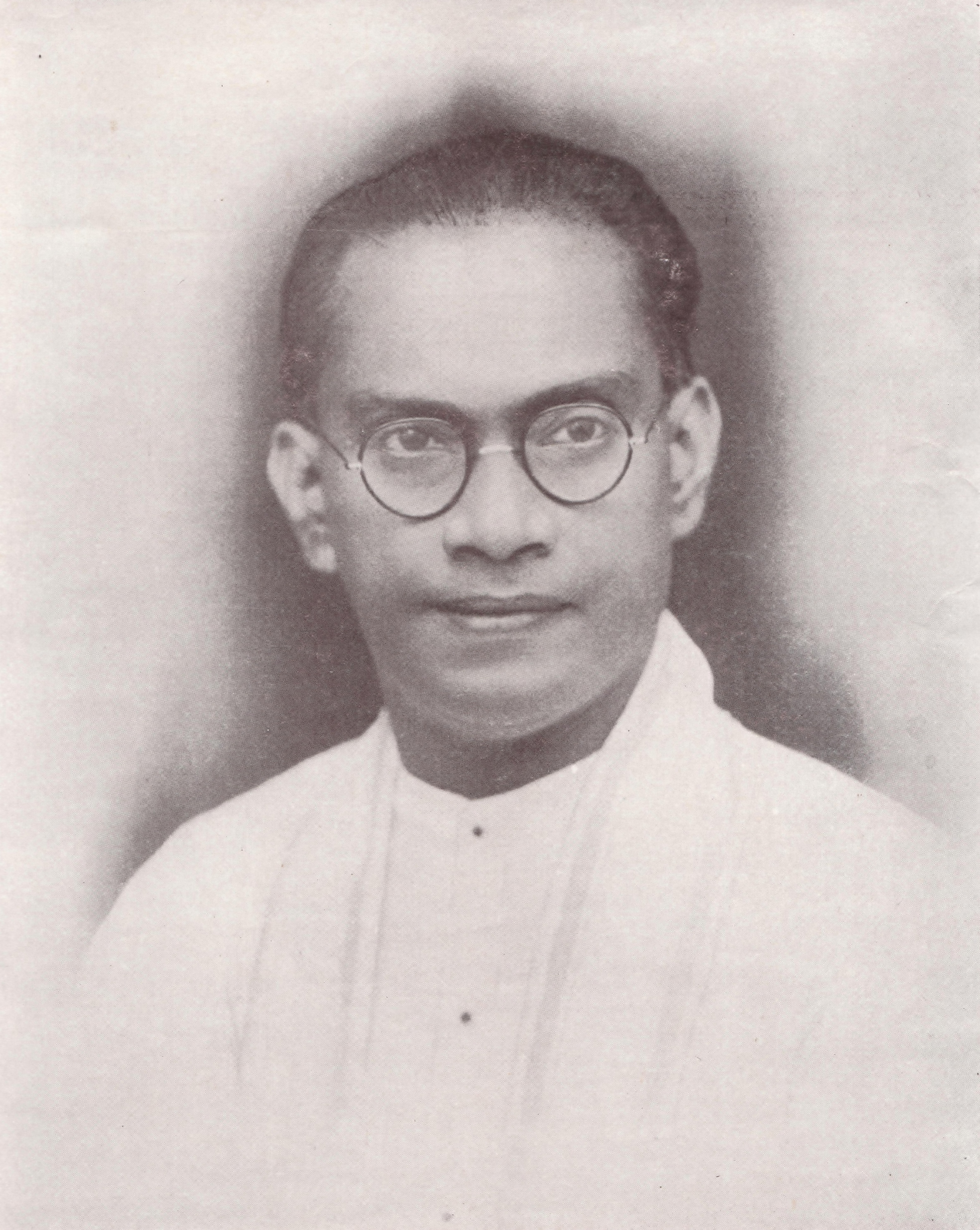
S. W. R. D. Bandaranaike, Prime Minister of Ceylon from 1956 to 1959

With escalating discrimination against Tamils and anti-Tamil riots the Tamil political leadership became convinced that the way forward was to have a separate and sovereign Tamil state. At its fourth annual convention in Trincomalee on 19 August 1956 ITAK passed four resolutions: autonomy for Tamil provinces within a federal structure; equal status for Sinhala and Tamil languages; restoration of citizenship and voting rights for Indian Tamils; and cessation of state-sponsored colonisation of Tamil land. Chelvanayakam gave Prime Minister S. W. R. D. Bandaranaike, leader of the SLFP, until 20 August 1957 to meet ITAK's demands, stating that otherwise a campaign of non-violent civil disobedience would be launched. Initially Bandaranaike was indifferent to ITAK's demands but, following campaigns by some parts of the English language media and advice by prominent Ceylonese, entered into negotiations with ITAK in April 1957. The Bandaranaike–Chelvanayakam Pact (B-C Pact) was signed on 26 July 1957. The pact provided the establishment of regional councils (Draft Regional Council Bill) with powers over specified subjects (e.g. agriculture, colonisation, cooperatives, education, electricity, fisheries, health, housing, industries, lands and land developments, roads, social services and water schemes) and powers of taxation and borrowing; amalgamation and division of regions; and allowing regional councils to allocate land in colonisation schemes to residents from their regions. Chelvanayakam wasn't entirely happy with the pact, which he considered an "interim adjustment" towards a federal state.

The B-C Pact was opposed by Sinhalese nationalists, led by the opposition UNP, who considered it to be division of the country. There was even more opposition from Sinhalese civil servants who undermined every concession given to Tamil civil servants by the pact. Civil servants from the Ministry of Transport sent state-owned Ceylon Transport Board buses bearing number plates with the Sinhalese prefix "Sri" to Tamil speaking areas, intentionally provoking a reaction from the Tamil population. Chelvanayakam led campaigns against the "Sri" number plates in Jaffna and Batticaloa, in March 1958 and April 1958 respectively, during which he spread tar over the "Sri". In Batticaloa he was arrested and charged for defacing number plates and imprisoned for one week. On 9 April 1958 hundreds of people, including Buddhist monks, staged a protest against the B-C pact on Bandaranaike's lawn at Rosemead Place, Colombo demanding abrogation of the pact. Bandaranaike obliged, publicly tearing the pact into pieces.

At its sixth annual convention in Vavuniya on 25 May 1958 ITAK resolved to launch a non-violent campaign of civil disobedience to achieve its goals. In May and June 1958 Ceylon witnessed anti-Tamil rioting. Bandaranaike blamed ITAK for precipitating the violence and banned the party along with the Jathika Vimukthi Peramuna (National Liberation Front). ITAK's leaders, including Chelvanayakam, were arrested on 4 June 1958 as they left Parliament and imprisoned. The ITAK leaders were placed under house arrest which meant that Chelvanayakam could not communicate with the public until late 1958 when the detention order was lifted.

Chelvanayakam was re-elected in the March 1960 parliamentary election which resulted in a hung parliament. The new Prime Minister Dudley Senanayake tried to get ITAK's support for his minority government but refused to give into ITAK's demands to end state-sponsored colonisation of Tamil-majority areas by Sinhalese, regional autonomy and the rights of Indian Tamils. As a result, ITAK started negotiations with the opposition SLFP who agreed to introduce the provisions of the B-C pact as bills in parliament. During the negotiations on forming an alternate stable government Chelvanayakam informed the Governor-General that ITAK would support a SLFP government for a full term and as result the Governor-General dissolved parliament.

=== Civil disobedience ===
Chelvanayakam was re-elected in the July 1960 parliamentary election in which the SLFP and its leftist allies achieved a majority in parliament. No longer needing ITAK's support in parliament, the SLFP reneged on its pledges to honour the B-C pact and commenced enacting anti-Tamil policies, announcing the full operation of the Sinhala Only Act from January 1961 and using Sinhala in courts of law throughout the country. ITAK launched a campaign of civil disobedience in January 1961, beginning in Jaffna. Chelvanayakam started distributing leaflets outside Jaffna Kachcheri in Old Park urging Tamil civil servants to boycott government offices and cease using Sinhala. The campaign was hugely successful and large crowds, including ITAK MPs, gathered in front of the Kachcheri and staged a protest rally.

Early on the morning of 20 February 1961 dozens of ITAK volunteers staged a satyagraha at the Jaffna Kachcheri. Among them were several ITAK MPs including Chelvanayakam. As Government Agent M. Srikantha and Superintendent of Police Richard Arndt tried to leave Old Park in a jeep the protesters blocked their way. The police baton charged the protestors, kicking and dragging them away. Several protestors, including ITAK MPs A. Amirthalingam, V. Dharmalingam, V. A. Kandiah, E. M. V. Naganathan and K. Thurairatnam were injured. The police fired tear gas to disperse a large crowd that had gathered to watch the satyagraha. At the end of the day Chelvanayakam issued a press statement saying that it was "a great day for the Tamil-speaking people of Ceylon. This was the day we resorted to direct action to win our freedom".

As the civil disobedience campaign spread to other parts of the north-east, Prime Minister Sirimavo Bandaranaike accused ITAK of trying to establish a separate state. In April 1961 the satyagrahas were removed by the army using brutal force. A state of emergency was declared on 18 April 1961. ITAK was banned, and its MPs and other leading members arrested and imprisoned at Panagoda Cantonment. Chelvanayakam was allowed to leave the camp and return home due to his deteriorating health. Chelvanayakam suffered from Parkinson's disease and his hearing had been gradually failing. After initially refusing, Prime Minister Sirimavo Bandaranaike allowed Chelvanayakam to travel to the UK to undergo surgery in Edinburgh at the hands of a neurosurgeon Francis John Gillingham. The operation was successful and after a few months recuperating in London Chelvanayakam returned to Ceylon.

The detention order on the ITAK leaders was lifted in October 1961. As a compromise the Bandaranaike government proposed the District Councils Bill to devolve powers to districts but following protests from Sinhalese Buddhist nationalists dropped the bill in June 1964. In 1964, as ITAK started preparing for a second civil disobedience campaign, the government started collapsing. As several SLFP MPs defected to the opposition, the government sough ITAK's support but ITAK chose instead to support the opposition and on 3 December 1964 the government was unable to prove its majority in parliament, precipitating an election.

=== Dudley-Chelvanayakam Pact ===
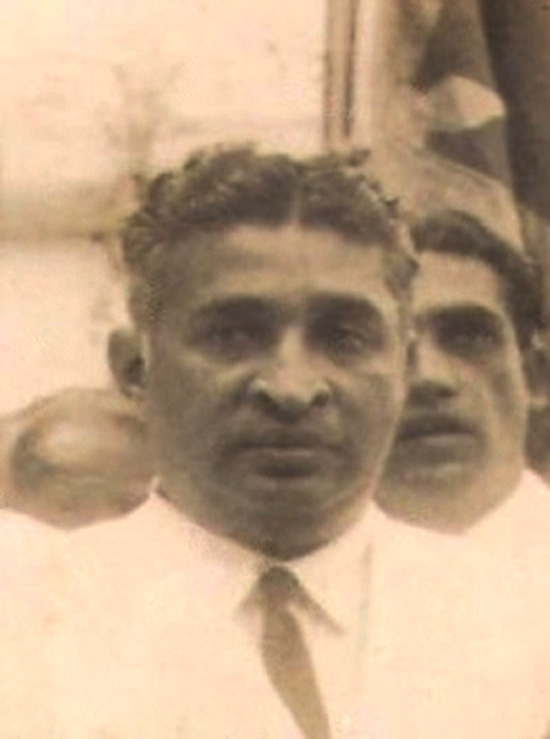
Dudley Senanayake, who served as Prime Minister of Ceylon on three occasions

Chelvanayakam was re-elected in the 1965 parliamentary election which resulted in a hung parliament. After the election Chelvanayakam met with UNP leader Dudley Senanayake who agreed to Chelvanayakam's conditions for supporting a UNP led government. The agreement, known as the Dudley-Chelvanayakam Pact (D-C Pact), was put down on paper and signed by Chelvanayakam and Senanayake on 24 March 1965. Under the Dudley-Chelvanayakam Pact, which was a modified version of the B-C pact, Senanayake agreed to make Tamil the language of administration and of record in the Northern and Eastern provinces (Tamil Language Special Provisions Act); amend the Languages of Courts Act to allow legal proceedings in the Northern and Eastern provinces to be conducted and recorded in Tamil; establish District Councils vested with powers over mutually agreed subjects; amend the Land Development Ordinance to provide allotment of land to citizens; and grant land under colonization schemes in the Northern and Eastern provinces to landless people in the district, to Tamil-speaking residents from the two provinces, and to other citizens with preference being given to Tamils from other provinces. Senanayake kept the contents of the D-C Pact a secret which allowed Sinhalese nationalists to allege that he had agreed to the division of the country. Even the leftist Lanka Sama Samaja Party and Communist Party of Ceylon joined the Sinhala nationalist SLFP in propagating this claim.

=== National government ===
ITAK joined the UNP-led seven party national government (hath haula). ITAK was offered three cabinet posts in the national government but, as the party had pledged that none of its MPs would accept ministerial positions until federalism had been achieved, it asked that M. Tiruchelvam be appointed to the Senate and given the Home Affairs portfolio. Senanayake refused to give the Home Affairs portfolio to ITAK and instead gave Tiruchelvam the Local Government portfolio. The Tamil Language (Special Provisions) Regulation 1966, which made Tamil the language of administration in the Northern and Eastern provinces, was passed by Parliament in July 1966. The District Councils Bill, which was presented to Parliament in June 1968, met with opposition from UNP backbenchers and was abandoned.

Tiruchelvam resigned from the government in November 1968 when Senanayake over-ruled Tiruchelvam's decision to appoint a committee to look into declaring Fort Fredrick, including the historic Koneswaram temple, a Hindu sacred area. Senanayake's decision had come after the Buddhist high chief priest of Tammankaduwa had objected to such a declaration, stating that it would result in the area getting "into the hands of those who are neither Sinhalese nor Buddhists". Chelvanayakam informed Senanayake that ITAK would withdraw from the national government. Thereafter ITAK sat as an independent group in Parliament, supporting or opposing the government based on the issue in question.

=== United Front ===
Chelvanayakam was re-elected in the 1970 parliamentary election which resulted in the Sinhala nationalist SLFP and its leftist allies winning a large majority in Parliament. Sensing that life was going to get even worse for Tamils under the United Front government, Chelvanayakam declared "Only God can help the Tamils". Some Tamil youth, who felt that they had no other choice, started resorting to violence. Chelvanayakam, who still commanded respect among Tamil youth, urged them to renounce violence and continue with their education.

Following the 1971 JVP insurrection the United Front started implementing policies aimed at the causes of the insurrection but which further discriminated against Tamils. Jobs and land in the newly nationalised plantations were given to Sinhala youth, to the exclusion of Tamils. Chelvanayakam labelled the nationalisation "highway robbery". The policy of standardisation replaced the merit based system for university entrance with one based on ethnicity, discriminating against Tamil youths.

Using its large majority in Parliament, the United Front government started the process of replacing the "British imposed" Soulbury Constitution. The government's proposed new constitution was seen as a Sinhala-Buddhist document by ITAK which mobilised Tamil public support against it. The proposals to constitutionally enshrine Sinhala as the sole official language, give special provision for Buddhism and repeal the protection for minorities particularly alarmed ITAK. ITAK believed that if Tamils did not participate in the constitution setting process they could demand self determination and a revert to the pre-British structures which existed before 1833. On 7 February 1971 Tamil parties held an all-party conference in Valvettithurai at which they issued a six-point memorandum of demands on regional autonomy, language rights, colonisation, employment discrimination and citizenship for Indian Tamils. The government rejected the demands and refused to invite the ITAK MPs to give evidence before the constituent assembly. Chelvanayakam vowed to resume civic protests and in February 1972, while visiting Madras, declared that ITAK would launch a non-violent struggle to agitate for a separate state.

=== Tamil United Front ===
There was growing resentment amongst Tamils at the monopolisation of political and economic power by the Sinhalese. As a result, Tamil parties started coming together and on 14 May 1972 the ITAK, ACTC, Ceylon Workers' Congress, Eelath Thamilar Otrumai Munnani and All Ceylon Tamil Conference met in Trincomalee and formed the Tamil United Front (TUF) with Chelvanayakam as its president. The TUF MPs boycotted the ceremonial opening of the National State Assembly (NSA) on 22 May 1972, the day the new constitution was promulgated. In October 1972 Chelvanayakam informed the NSA that he was resigning his parliamentary seat and would seek re-election on the issue of the new constitution which he claimed had been rejected by the Tamils. The government delayed holding a by-election in Chelvanayakam's constituency, citing the possibility of violence, which resulted in Chelvanayakam being exiled from Parliament for nearly two and half years. Chelvanayakam wrote to Prime Minister Sirimavo Bandaranaike on 4 November 1973 stating that the election would be peaceful and that the government's supporters could campaign freely. Bandaranaike did not respond.

In the meantime, Tamil political opinion started shifting as a result of the government's perceived apathy and the Prime Minister's apparent inability to recognise the consequences of the growing ethnic tension in the country. At its 12th annual convention in Mallakam in September 1973 ITAK passed a resolution seeking self-determination for Tamils. Tamils now established their claim to be a sovereign nation-state and Chelvanayakam was considered the father of the nation. For his part Chelvanayakam ingrained the concept of a "traditional homeland for the Tamil people" in the mindset of the Tamils. Violence between Tamil militant youth and the government also escalated.

=== Tamil United Liberation Front ===
The by-election in Kankesanthurai was eventually held on 6 February 1975 and Chelvanayakam was re-elected with a large majority. At a meeting in Jaffna in 1975 the TUF's action committee resolved to change the TUF's name to Tamil United Liberation Front (TULF). Chelvanayakam, G. G. Ponnambalam and S. Thondaman would be the TULF's co-leaders. The TULF held its first national convention in May 1976 in Vaddukoddai and on 14 May 1976, under Chelvanayakam's chairmanship, passed the Vaddukoddai Resolution calling for the "restoration and reconstitution of the free, sovereign, secular, socialist state of Tamil Eelam". On 19 November 1976, in one of his last speeches in the NSA, Chelvanayakam acknowledged that his quest to obtain the "lost rights of the Tamil speaking people" through federalism had failed. "We have abandoned the demand for a federal constitution" he stated, "We know that the Sinhalese people will one day grant our demand and that we will be able to establish a state separate from the rest of the island."

On 21 May 1976 several Tamil politicians (A. Amirthalingam, V. N. Navaratnam, K. P. Ratnam, M. Sivasithamparam and K. Thurairatnam) were delivering leaflets when they were all arrested on government orders. Sivasithamparam was released but the others were taken to Colombo and tried for sedition. All the defendants were acquitted on 10 February 1977 after a high-profile trial-at-bar (Note: A trial-at-bar is a trial before three or more judges.) case in which around 70 prominent Tamil lawyers, including Chelvanayakam and G. G. Ponnambalam, acted for the defence.

The last years of Chelvanayakam were personally difficult. He had financial problems as a result of the government not paying him compensation for the nationalisation of two plantations in which he had shares. Two of his sons and daughter had moved abroad. He had frequent falls as a result of his Parkinson disease.

In March 1977 the government sought the TULF's support for extending the life of Parliament. Chelvanayakam and other TULF leaders did not trust the SLFP but felt that they had to take part in the discussions which were halted when Chelvanayakam fell ill. He was left unconscious after falling heavily. Chelvanayakam died on 26 April 1977. (Note: According to another source Chelvanayakam died on 27 March 1977.) At his funeral oration Bishop of Jaffna D. J. Ambalavanar said of Chelvanayakam "like Moses, Mr. Chelvanayagam showed us the promised land, but failed to reach it on his own".

== Legacy ==
Chelvanayakam has been described as a father figure to Ceylon's Tamils, to whom he was known as "Thanthai Chelva" (Father Chelva). Ceylon Workers' Congress leader S. Thondaman said of him, "Chelvanayakam was the Tamil people; and the Tamil people were Chelvanayakam". He was noted for his integrity and respected by both allies and opponents. Known as the "Trousered Gandhi" by Tamils, Chelvanayakam was compared with Gandhi for his commitment to using non-violent methods to achieve his political goals. Critics, however, faulted him for naively believing that the Ceylon Tamils' political demands could be achieved through Parliamentary institutions. While many of Ceylon's political leaders gave up Christianity for reasons of political expediency, Chelvanayakam remained a Christian which led to opponents questioning his right to lead Tamils, the majority of whom were Hindu.

Chelvanayakam's non-violent methods proved to be ineffective against Sinhalese-Buddhist nationalism and failed to secure Tamils' rights from successive governments. With his death the era of non-violent protest was replaced by violent militancy.

== Electoral history ==
Electoral history of S. J. V. Chelvanayakam
Election	Constituency	Party	Votes	Result
1947 parliamentary	Kankesanthurai	ACTC	12,126	Elected
1952 parliamentary	Kankesanthurai	ITAK	11,571	Not elected
1956 parliamentary	Kankesanthurai	ITAK	14,855	Elected
1960 March parliamentary	Kankesanthurai	ITAK	13,545	Elected
1960 July parliamentary	Kankesanthurai	ITAK	15,668	Elected
1965 parliamentary	Kankesanthurai	ITAK	14,735	Elected
1970 parliamentary	Kankesanthurai	ITAK	13,520	Elected
1975 parliamentary by	Kankesanthurai	TUF	25,927	Elected
