= K. Thurairatnam =

Sri Lankan Tamil politician

Hon. K. Thurairatnam
- க. துரைரத்தினம்

Member of the Ceylonese Parliament for Point Pedro
- In office 1960–1983
- Preceded by: P. Kandiah

Personal details
- Born: 10 August 1930
- Died: 23 September 1995 (aged 65)
- Party: Illankai Tamil Arasu Kachchi
- Other political affiliations: Tamil United Liberation Front
- Education: University of Ceylon; Ceylon Law College
- Profession: Teacher, lawyer
- Ethnicity: Sri Lankan Tamil

Kathiripillai Thurairatnam (Tamil: கதிரிப்பிள்ளை துரைரத்தினம், 10 August 1930 – 23 September 1995) was a Sri Lankan Tamil teacher, lawyer, politician and Member of Parliament.

== Early life ==
Thurairatnam was born on 10 August 1930. He was educated at Jaffna College, Vaddukoddai. He joined the clerical service at the age of 17 but left soon after to enter the University of Ceylon.

== Career ==
After graduation he joined the teaching profession. He taught at the Puloly Hindu English School until 1960. Later on he studied at Ceylon Law College and qualified as a lawyer.

Thurairatnam joined the Illankai Tamil Arasu Kachchi (Federal Party) soon after it was formed. He stood as the ITAK's candidate in Point Pedro at the 1956 parliamentary election but was defeated by the Communist Party candidate P. Kandiah. He however won the March 1960 parliamentary election and entered Parliament. He was re-elected at the July 1960, March 1965 and May 1970 parliamentary elections.

Thurairatnam played a leading role in the 1961 satyagraha campaign organised by ITAK. Early on the morning of 20 February 1961 a group of 55 to 75 persons staged a satyagraha at the Jaffna Kachcheri in Old Park. Among them were ITAK MPs A. Amirthalingam, S. J. V. Chelvanayakam, V. Dharmalingam, V. A. Kandiah, E. M. V. Naganathan, V. N. Navaratnam and Thurairatnam. A large group of policemen arrived in riot gear, wearing helmets and carrying batons and shields. The police started removing the protesters by lifting and carrying them away. Those who resisted were dragged away. Later, as Government Agent M. Srikantha and Superintendent of Police Richard Arndt tried to leave Old Park in a jeep the protesters blocked their way. The police reacted with brutality, beating he protesters with batons and pulled them out bodily. Palaniyappan, a young man who had thrown himself in front of the jeep was pulled away by the police and beaten severely with batons. Five ITAK MPs were amongst the protesters blocking the jeep. Kandiah was carried out and dumped on the ground, Dharmalingam and Thurairatnam were dragged out by their hands and legs whilst Amirthalingam and Naganathan were baton charged. The police also baton charged a crowd of around 5,000 who had gathered to watch the satyagraha.

On 14 May 1972 the ITAK, All Ceylon Tamil Congress, Ceylon Workers' Congress, Eelath Thamilar Otrumai Munnani and All Ceylon Tamil Conference formed the Tamil United Front, later renamed Tamil United Liberation Front (TULF). On 21 May 1976 Thurairatnam was delivering leaflets along with other leading Tamil politicians (A. Amirthalingam, V. N. Navaratnam, K. P. Ratnam and M. Sivasithamparam) when they were all arrested on government orders. Sivasithamparam was released but the others were taken to Colombo and tried for sedition. All the defendants were acquitted on 10 February 1977 after a famous trial at bar case in which around 70 leading Tamil lawyers, including S. J. V. Chelvanayakam and G. G. Ponnambalam, acted for the defence.

Thurairatnam was the TULF's candidate in Point Pedro at the 1977 parliamentary election and was re-elected. Thurairatnam and all other TULF MPs boycotted Parliament from the middle of 1983 for a number of reasons: they were under pressure from Sri Lankan Tamil militants not to stay in Parliament beyond their normal six-year term; the Sixth Amendment to the Constitution of Sri Lanka required them to swear an oath unconditionally renouncing support for a separate state; and the 1983 Black July riots in which up to 3,000 Tamils were murdered by Sinhalese mobs. After three months of absence, Thurairatnam forfeited his seat in Parliament on 5 January 1984.

Thurairatnam died on 23 September 1995.
