= V. A. Kandiah =

Sri Lankan Tamil politician

Hon. V. A. Kandiah MP
- வி. ஏ. கந்தையா

Member of the Ceylonese Parliament for Kayts
- In office 1956–1963
- Preceded by: Alfred Thambiayah
- Succeeded by: V. Navaratnam

Personal details
- Born: 3 September 1891
- Died: 4 June 1963 (aged 71)
- Party: Illankai Tamil Arasu Kachchi
- Education: Ceylon University College
- Profession: Lawyer
- Ethnicity: Ceylon Tamil

Velupillai Ambalavanar Kandiah (3 September 1891 – 4 June 1963) was a Ceylon Tamil lawyer, politician and Member of Parliament.

== Early life and family ==
Kandiah was born on 3 September 1891. He was from the island of Velanaitivu in northern Ceylon. He was educated at Jaffna Hindu College and St. Joseph's College, Colombo. After school Kandiah joined the Ceylon University College, graduating in 1922 with a B.Sc. degree.

Kandiah married and had two sons and three daughters.

== Career ==
Kandiah taught science at St. Joseph's College, Colombo for about eight years before joining the legal profession and becoming an advocate. He practised law in Colombo.

Kandiah stood as a candidate in Colombo Central at the 1947 parliamentary election but was unsuccessful. He was the Illankai Tamil Arasu Kachchi (Federal Party)'s candidate in Kayts at the 1956 parliamentary election. He won the election and entered Parliament. He was re-elected at the March 1960 and July 1960 parliamentary elections.

Following the 1958 riots ITAK and the Jathika Vimukthi Peramuna (National Liberation Front) were banned. ITAK's leaders, including Kandiah, were arrested on 4 June 1958 as they left Parliament and imprisoned.

Kandiah played a leading role in the 1961 satyagraha campaign organised by ITAK. Early on the morning of 20 February 1961 a group of 55 to 75 persons staged a satyagraha at the Jaffna Kachcheri in Old Park. Among them were ITAK MPs A. Amirthalingam, S. J. V. Chelvanayakam, V. Dharmalingam, Kandiah, E. M. V. Naganathan, V. N. Navaratnam and K. Thurairatnam. A large group of policemen arrived in riot gear, wearing helmets and carrying batons and shields. The police started removing the protesters by lifting and carrying them away. Those who resisted were dragged away. Later, as Government Agent M. Srikantha and Superintendent of Police Richard Arndt tried to leave Old Park in a jeep the protesters blocked their way. The police reacted with brutality, beating the protesters with batons and pulling them out bodily. Palaniyappan, a young man who had thrown himself in front of the jeep was pulled away by the police and beaten severely with batons. Five ITAK MPs were amongst the protesters blocking the jeep. Kandiah was carried out and dumped on the ground, Dharmalingam and Thurairatnam were dragged out by their hands and legs whilst Amirthalingam and Naganathan were baton charged. The police also baton charged a crowd of around 5,000 who had gathered to watch the satyagraha.

Kandiah was a founding member of the Hindu Educational Society which established a number of schools, including the Colombo Hindu College. He died on 4 June 1963.
