= V. N. Navaratnam =

Sri Lankan Tamil politician

Hon. V. N. Navaratnam MP
- வ. ந. நவரத்தினம்

Member of the Ceylonese Parliament for Chavakachcheri
- In office 1956–1983
- Preceded by: V. Kumaraswamy

Personal details
- Born: 5 June 1929 Chavakachcheri, Ceylon
- Died: 29 January 1991 (aged 61) Toronto, Ontario, Canada
- Party: Illankai Tamil Arasu Kachchi
- Other political affiliations: Tamil United Liberation Front
- Spouse: Ragupathi Navaratnam
- Education: Ceylon Law College
- Profession: Lawyer
- Ethnicity: Sri Lankan Tamil

Vallipuram Nallathamby Navaratnam (Tamil: வல்லிபுரம் நல்லதம்பி நவரத்தினம்; 5 June 1929 – 29 January 1991) was a Sri Lankan Tamil lawyer, politician and Member of Parliament.

== Early life and family ==
Navaratnam was born on 5 June 1929 in Chavakachcheri in northern Ceylon. He was educated at Drieberg College, Chavakachcheri and Jaffna Central College. He later joined Ceylon Law College, graduating as an advocate.

Navaratnam had three sons (Sri Namachchivaya, Vallipurananda and Sri Shanmugananda) and a daughter (Maitreyi).

== Career ==
Navaratnam was called to the bar in 1954 and practised law in Jaffna, specialising in criminal law. He taught at schools for a brief period.

Navaratnam became a Member of entered Parliament after winning the 1956 parliamentary election as the Illankai Tamil Arasu Kachchi (Federal Party) candidate in Chavakachcheri. He was re-elected at the March 1960, July 1960, 1965 and 1970 parliamentary elections.

On 5 June 1956 a group of Tamil activists and parliamentarians, including Navaratnam, staged a satyagraha against the Sinhala Only Act on Galle Face Green opposite the Parliament. The satyagrahis were attacked by a Sinhalese mob as the police looked on, and Navaratnam and E. M. V. Naganathan were thrown in the lake. Following the 1958 riots ITAK and the Jathika Vimukthi Peramuna (National Liberation Front) were banned. ITAK's leaders, including Navaratnam, were arrested on 4 June 1958 as they left Parliament and imprisoned .

Navaratnam played a leading role in the 1961 satyagraha campaign organised by ITAK. Early on the morning of 20 February 1961 a group of 55 to 75 persons staged a satyagraha at the Jaffna Kachcheri in Old Park. Among them were ITAK MPs A. Amirthalingam, S. J. V. Chelvanayakam, V. Dharmalingam, V. A. Kandiah, E. M. V. Naganathan, Navaratnam and K. Thurairatnam. A large group of policemen arrived in riot gear, wearing helmets and carrying batons and shields. The police started removing the protesters by lifting and carrying them away. Those who resisted were dragged away. Later, as Government Agent M. Srikantha and Superintendent of Police Richard Arndt tried to leave Old Park in a jeep the protesters blocked their way. The police reacted with brutality, beating the protesters with batons and pulled them out bodily. Palaniyappan, a young man who had thrown himself in front of the jeep was pulled away by the police and beaten severely with batons. Five ITAK MPs were amongst the protesters blocking the jeep. Kandiah was carried out and dumped on the ground, Dharmalingam and Thurairatnam were dragged out by their hands and legs whilst Amirthalingam and Naganathan were baton charged. The police also baton charged a crowd of around 5,000 who had gathered to watch the satyagraha.

On 14 May 1972 the ITAK, All Ceylon Tamil Congress, Ceylon Workers' Congress, Eelath Thamilar Otrumai Munnani and All Ceylon Tamil Conference formed the Tamil United Front, later renamed Tamil United Liberation Front (TULF). Following ITAK leader S. J. V. Chelvanayakam's resignation from Parliament in October 1972 Navaratnam became the party's leader in Parliament. Navaratnam was one of the TULF's vice presidents. On 21 May 1976 Navaratnam was delivering leaflets along with other leading Tamil politicians (A. Amirthalingam, K. P. Ratnam, M. Sivasithamparam and K. Thurairatnam) when they were all arrested on government orders. Sivasithamparam was released but the others were taken to Colombo and tried for sedition. All the defendants were acquitted on 10 February 1977 after a famous trial at bar case in which around 70 leading Tamil lawyers, including S. J. V. Chelvanayakam and G. G. Ponnambalam, acted for the defence.

Navaratnam was the TULF's candidate in Chavakachcheri at the 1977 parliamentary election and was re-elected. Navaratnam and all other TULF MPs boycotted Parliament from the middle of 1983 for a number of reasons: they were under pressure from Sri Lankan Tamil militants not to stay in Parliament beyond their normal six-year term; the Sixth Amendment to the Constitution of Sri Lanka required them to swear an oath unconditionally renouncing support for a separate state; and the Black July riots in which up to 3,000 Tamils were killed by Sinhalese mobs. After three months of absence, Navaratnam forfeited his seat in Parliament on 22 October 1983.

== Later life ==
Navaratnam left Sri Lanka after the Black July riots. He lived in the United Kingdom for a while before moving to Canada. He practised law in all three countries. He died on 29 January 1991 after a heart attack.
