= Tamil Eelam Liberation Army =

Separatist group in Sri Lanka

The Tamil Eelam Liberation Army was a Sri Lankan Tamil rebel group. TELA was originally the military wing of the Tamil Eelam Liberation Organization, but split away from TELO in 1982.

== Early period ==
TELA was founded by Thangathurai at a meeting in a temple in Thondamanaru in September 1977, along with the Tamil Eelam Liberation Organization (TELO). TELA was to function as the military wing of the movement, whilst TELO would be its political wing. Thangathurai had modeled this set-up based on the Provisional IRA-Sinn Féin. In its early phase, TELA gained a notable presence in the Jaffna area. It was, alongside the Liberation Tigers of Tamil Eelam, the largest Tamil militant group in the area.

== Split from TELO ==
In 1981, after the TELO leaders were arrested, TELA broke loose from TELO and began functioning as a separate political faction. After the split, TELA was led by Kulasegaram Devasegaram (Oberoi Devan). Devasegaram had a feud with Prabhakaran (who was then in the TELO), which had resulted in the split. At this point, TELA became known for a series of attacks on government property.

Devasegaram was assassinated in August 1983, soon after the split. At a press conference held in Colombo, Douglas Liyanage, Secretary to the Ministry of State, officially stated that Devasekaram had been shot dead and his body was subsequently cremated by the assailants. The Liberation Tigers of Tamil Eelam (LTTE) was blamed for the killing of Devasegaram, and soon afterwards TELA aligned itself with the archrival of LTTE, the People's Liberation Organisation of Tamil Eelam.

== Internal disarray ==
After the killing of TELA leader Castro, splits and internal feuds appeared within the organization. The group was divided into two factions, one led by Rajan and another led by Senthil. Followers of the two groupings began killing each other. PLOTE sided with the Senthil faction. The links between PLOTE and TELA and the animosity between TELA and LTTE eventually resulted in the breakdown of the talks between PLOTE and the Eelam National Liberation Front. ENLF was a coalition of Tamil militant groups (TELO, EROS, EPRLF including LTTE). PLOTE insisted that the Senthil faction of TELA ought to be included in ENLF along with PLOTE, a demand that the LTTE refused to accept.
