= N. Q. Dias =

Sri Lankan civil servant

N.Q. Dias
- Born: Neil Quintus Dias; Panadura, British Ceylon
- Died: Sri Lanka

Neil Quintus Dias, commonly known as N.Q. Dias, was a Sri Lankan civil servant. A career officer of the Ceylon Civil Service, he was the Permanent Secretary of Defence and Foreign Affairs from 1960 to 1965, serving as the de facto Chief Adviser to Prime Minister Sirimavo Bandaranaike and as Ceylon's High Commissioner to India from 1970 to 1972.

A Sinhalese Buddhist nationalist, N.Q. Dias was known for planning and executing many of the Sinhalese Buddhist nationalist policies of the Bandaranaike's Freedom Party.

== Education ==
Born in Panadura, Dias was educated at Trinity College, Kandy. He graduated from the University of London, gaining a BA degree and was enrolled as a barrister from the Middle Temple.

== Civil service ==
Passing the Ceylon Civil Service (CCS) entrance exam, Dias was appointed to the CCS as a cadet by the governor of Ceylon in January 1936. His first appointment as a cadet was to the Batticaloa Kachcheri, where he served as Additional Police Magistrate from June. In April 1937, he was transferred to the Jaffna Kachcheri and served as the Additional Police Magistrate, Jaffna. In August that year he was appointed as Assistant Secretary to the Minister for Communication and Works. Promoted to CCS Class II in December 1937, he was attached to the General Treasury and in July 1939 in addition to duties he was appointed deputy director of Civil Aviation and Registrar of Aircraft and Assistant Secretary to the Minister for Communication and Works August 1939. In the following years he was appointed to several other positions, Assistant Government Agent (Emergency) Beliatta (January 1942), Matugama (March 1943), Gampola (May 1944); Assistant Government Agent, Mannar (November 1945); Assistant at Matara to the Government Agent Southern Province (June 1948); Acting Assistant at Hambantota to the Government Agent Southern Province (June 1948); Assistant at Trincomalee to the Government Agent Eastern Province (October 1949) and in February 1951 he was appointed Government Agent, Sabaragamuwa Province. In October 1953, he was appointed Registrar of Lands and of Marriages, Births and Deaths. Following the election of S. W. R. D. Bandaranaike, Dias was appointed first Director of Cultural Affairs in 1956, serving until 1959.

== Nationalism ==
An ardent nationalist, Dias was noted for wearing national dress since 1949, which was uncommon for a CCS officer. He was a founder member of the board of management of the Sri Sumangala Schools in 1945. He established close ties with the Buddhist clergy and he was the founding President of the Government Services Buddhist Association and an officer bearer of the Public Services and Local Government Services Buddhist Societies Federation formed in 1954.

Although a member of the civil service and as such required to be politically neutral, Dias was a silent strategist uniting all the local Buddhist chapters (Nikayas) under the Eksath Bhikku Peramuna and helped forged the Mahajana Eksath Peramuna, a four-party coalition with a no-contest pact with the Lanka Sama Samaja Party and the Communist Party of Sri Lanka, led by Bandaranaike. Mahajana Eksath Peramuna won a landslide victory in the 1956 general elections, defeating the United National Party and paving the way for Bandaranaike to become prime minister. In the years that followed, he became disappointed in Bandaranaike for his limited nationalist reforms.

== Bandaranaike's adviser ==
Following the Bandaranaike assassination, and a brief period of political turmoil, his widow Sirimavo Bandaranaike took over his party and carried forward his nationalist policies and socialist reforms, having become the first female prime minister in the world. Dias had become the informal chief adviser to Mrs Bandaranaike. As a result, he was on the list of government officials to be arrested during the attempted military coup in 1962.

== Permanent Secretary of External Affairs and Defence ==
He was appointed Permanent Secretary of Defence and Foreign Affairs on 1 June 1961. In this capacity he implemented policies to change the composition of the army to match the demographically ratios of the population, increasing the number of Sinhala Buddhist officers in the armed forces.

=== Curbing Tamil protests ===
In April 1961, Bandaranaike declared a state of emergency in the northern province and ordered the army to clear the Satyagraha organized by the Tamil Federal Party against the Language policy of the government. In response to this incident and Chelvanayakam's claim that "we resorted to direct action to win our freedom" during the satyagraha, Dias proposed the increase of armed forces deployed to the northern and eastern province and called for the formation of military bases in Arippu, Maricchikatti, Pallai, Thalvapadu, Pooneryn, Karainagar, Palaly, Point Pedro, Elephant Pass, Mullaitivu and Trincomalee to counter possible rise of Tamil separatism.

In July 1963, Dias further instructed the Government Agent of Jaffna, Neville Jayaweera, to "force ‘confrontations’ upon the Tamil leaders at every turn possible, and to establish the government’s ‘absolute ascendency’ over them in every crisis.”

He further expanded Operations Monti to create the Task Force Anti Illicit Immigration (TFAII) in 1963 to counter illegal immigration from South India. The TFAII would function from 1963 to 1981 when it was terminated with the onset of the Sri Lankan Civil War.

== Later life ==
He retired in 1965, following the defeat of Bandaranaike in the election that year. In 1966, he was arrested and tried for the involvement in an alleged coup attempt. The case was subsequently dismissed when the jury unanimously acquitted all of the accused in a plot to overthrow the legally elected government due to lack of evidence. When the Sirimavo Bandaranaike was re-elected in 1970, Dias was appointed as Ceylon's High Commissioner to India, serving till 1972.

== See also ==
- Douglas Liyanage
- Sri Lankan Non Career Diplomats
