= A. Sivasunderam =

Ceylon Tamil politician and Member of Parliament

Hon. A. Sivasunderam
- அ. சிவசுந்தரம்

Member of the Ceylonese Parliament for Kilinochchi
- In office 1960–1965
- Succeeded by: K. P. Ratnam

Personal details
- Born: 2 October 1904
- Ethnicity: Ceylon Tamil

Appucutty Sivasunderam (Tamil: அப்புக்குட்டி சிவசுந்தரம்; born 2 October 1904) was a Ceylon Tamil politician and Member of Parliament.

Sivasunderam was born on 2 October 1904.

Sivasunderam stood as the Illankai Tamil Arasu Kachchi's (Federal Party) candidate in Kilinochchi at the March 1960 parliamentary election. He won the election and entered Parliament. He was re-elected at the July 1960 parliamentary election. He contested the 1970 parliamentary election as an independent candidate but was defeated by the All Ceylon Tamil Congress candidate V. Anandasangaree.
