= Rasalingam (surname) =

Rasalingam is a Tamil surname. Notable people with the surname include:

- Selva Rasalingam (born in 1968), British actor
- T. Rasalingam (born in 1933), Sri Lankan politician
