= V. Navaratnam =

Sri Lankan Tamil lawyer, politician and Member of Parliament

Hon. V. Navaratnam MP
- வி. நவரத்தினம்

Member of the Ceylonese Parliament for Kayts
- In office 1963–1970
- Preceded by: V. A. Kandiah
- Succeeded by: K. P. Ratnam

Personal details
- Born: 25 October 1910
- Died: 22 December 2006 (aged 97) Montreal, Quebec, Canada
- Education: Ceylon Law College
- Profession: Lawyer
- Ethnicity: Sri Lankan Tamil

Vaithianathan Navaratnam (25 October 1910 – 22 December 2006) was a Sri Lankan Tamil lawyer, politician and Member of Parliament.

== Early life and family ==
Navaratnam was born on 25 October 1910. He was the son of Vaithianathan from Karampon on the island of Velanaitivu in northern Ceylon. He was educated at Karampon Shanmuganathan Maha Vidyalayam, St. Patrick's College, Jaffna and Ananda College. After school he joined Ceylon Law College, graduating as a proctor in 1936.

Navaratnam married his first cousin Parameswari. They had five sons (Chandra Mohan, Jagadishan, Jegan Mohan, Raj Mohan and Bala Mohan) and a daughter (Shyamala).

== Career ==
Navaratnam became interested in politics following Ceylonese independence in 1948. He was appointed joint secretary of the Illankai Tamil Arasu Kachchi (Federal Party) when it was founded in 1949.

Navaratnam stood as ITAK's candidate in Kayts at the 1952 parliamentary election but was defeated by the All Ceylon Tamil Congress candidate Alfred Thambiayah. He was ITAK's theoretician and played an important role in the formulation of the Bandaranaike–Chelvanayakam Pact. Navaratnam stood as ITAK's candidate in the constituency in the 1963 by-election following the sitting MP V. A. Kandiah's death. He won the election and entered Parliament. He was re-elected at the 1965 parliamentary election.

An ardent Tamil nationalist, Navaratnam fell out with the ITAK leadership over its decision to join Dudley Senanayake's national government and left the party in 1968. In 1969 he founded the Tamils Suyaadchchi Kazahagam (Tamil Self Rule Party) which campaigned for Tamil self-rule and independence for the Tamil speaking provinces of Ceylon. He stood as an independent candidate in Kayts at the 1970 and 1977 parliamentary elections but on each occasion was defeated the ITAK/Tamil United Liberation Front candidate K. P. Ratnam.

Navaratnam has written two books: Ceylon Faces Crisis (1956) and The Fall and Rise of the Tamil Nation (1995). He died on 22 December 2006 in Montreal, Quebec, Canada. He was posthumously conferred the title of Naattu Patralar (patriot) by the Liberation Tigers of Tamil Eelam.
