= Anandasangaree =

Anandasangaree ஆனந்தசங்கரி
- Romanisation: Āṉantacaṅkari
- Gender: Male
- Language: Tamil

Origin
- Region of origin: Southern India; North-eastern Sri Lanka

Anandasangaree (Tamil: ஆனந்தசங்கரி, romanized: Āṉantacaṅkari) is a Tamil male given name. Due to the Tamil tradition of using patronymic surnames, it may also be a surname for males and females.

== Notable people ==
=== Given name ===
- V. Anandasangaree (born 1933), Sri Lankan Tamil politician

=== Surname ===
- Gary Anandasangaree (born 1973), Canadian politician
