= T. Ramalingam =

Ceylon Tamil lawyer, politician and Member of Parliament

Hon. T. Ramalingam
- தா. இராமலிங்கம்

Member of the Ceylonese Parliament for Point Pedro
- In office 1947–1956
- Succeeded by: P. Kandiah

Deputy Chairman of Committees
- In office 15 February 1951 – 8 April 1952
- Preceded by: H. S. Ismail
- Succeeded by: M. W. R. de Silva

Personal details
- Born: 26 October 1904
- Party: All Ceylon Tamil Congress
- Education: Ceylon University College
- Profession: Lawyer
- Ethnicity: Ceylon Tamil

Thamodarampillai Ramalingam (Tamil: தாமோதரம்பிள்ளை இராமலிங்கம்; born 26 October 1904) was a Ceylon Tamil lawyer, politician and Member of Parliament.

== Early life ==
Ramalingam was born on 26 October 1904. He was the son of R. Thamodarampillai, a proctor from Udupiddy in northern Ceylon. He was educated at the Udupiddy American Mission College. After school Ramalingam joined Ceylon University College, graduating in 1926 with a B.Sc. degree.

== Career ==
Ramalingam joined the legal profession, practising as an advocate in northern Ceylon. He then joined the bench, serving as a magistrate.

Ramalingam contested the 1947 parliamentary election as the All Ceylon Tamil Congress's (ACTC) candidate in Point Pedro. He won the election and entered Parliament. The ACTC joined the United National Party led government on 3 September 1948. Ramalingam was made Deputy Chairman of Committees in 1951. He was re-elected at the 1952 parliamentary election.
