= V. Kumaraswamy =

Ceylon Tamil lawyer, politician and Member of Parliament

Hon. V. Kumaraswamy MP
- வே. குமாரசுவாமி

Member of the Ceylonese Parliament for Chavakachcheri
- In office 1947–1956
- Succeeded by: V. N. Navaratnam

Personal details
- Born: 31 July 1919
- Died: 10 March 1978 (aged 58) Colombo, Sri Lanka
- Education: Ceylon Law College
- Profession: Lawyer
- Ethnicity: Ceylon Tamil

Velupillai Kumaraswamy (Tamil: வேலுப்பிள்ளை குமாரசுவாமி; 31 July 1919 – 10 March 1978) was a Ceylon Tamil lawyer, politician and Member of Parliament.

== Early life and family ==
Kumaraswamy was born on 31 July 1919. He was the son of Velupillai, a proctor from Chavakachcheri in northern Ceylon. After school Kumaraswamy joined Ceylon Law College, qualifying as an advocate.

Kumaraswamy had a son (Vaheeswaran) and a daughter (Dushyanti).

== Career ==
Whilst still studying law, Kumaraswamy stood as the All Ceylon Tamil Congress's (ACTC) candidate in Chavakachcheri at the 1947 parliamentary election. He won the election and entered Parliament. Kumaraswamy became a Parliamentary Secretary after the ACTC joined the United National Party dominated government in 1948.

Kumaraswamy was re-elected at the 1952 parliamentary election. The ACTC left the UNP government in 1953 but Kumaraswamy chose to remain with the UNP. Kumaraswamy left the UNP in 1956 over the party's support of the Sinhala Only Act.

Kumaraswamy stood for re-election in the constituency at the 1956 parliamentary election as an independent candidate but was defeated by the Illankai Tamil Arasu Kachchi (Federal Party) candidate V. N. Navaratnam. He was the ACTC's candidate in the constituency at the March 1960 and 1970 parliamentary elections but on each occasion was defeated by Navaratnam. He contested the 1977 parliamentary election as an independent candidate but was again defeated by Navaratnam.

Kumaraswamy practised law in Colombo.
