= A. V. Kulasingham =

Ceylon Tamil lawyer, politician, journalist and editor

- ஏ. வி. குலசிங்கம்
- Born: 11 October 1890
- Died: 16 January 1978 (aged 87)
- Education: Jaffna College
- Occupation: Journalist
- Political party: All Ceylon Tamil Congress

Aiyathurai Varnakulasingham Kulasingham (11 October 1890 – 16 January 1978) was a Ceylon Tamil lawyer, politician, journalist and editor of the Ceylon Daily News and Hindu Organ.

== Early life and family ==
Kulasingham was born on 11 October 1890. He was educated at Jaffna College.

Kulasingham married Rasammah, daughter of Thambu, in 1910. They had three sons (Rudrasingam, Karalasingam and Jeganathan) and five daughters (Manonmani, Annapillai, Thilagam, Pathmaranee and Jeyamani).

== Career ==
Kulasingham got involved in journalism whilst still a student, contributing articles to the Morning Star and The Times of Ceylon. He was later editor of the Ceylon Daily News (1925) and Hindu Organ, and special correspondent to the Manchester Guardian.

Kulasingham was also an advocate and practised law for more than 50 years. He was also a crown advocate.

Kulasingham was a founding member of the All Ceylon Tamil Congress (ACTC) in 1944 and served as joint secretary. He contested the 1947 parliamentary election in Kayts as the ACTC candidate but was defeated by Alfred Thambiayah by just 322 votes.

== Death ==
Kulasingham died on 16 January 1978.
