= Chavakachcheri Electoral District =

Former electoral district of Sri Lanka

Chavakachcheri Electoral District was an electoral district of Sri Lanka between August 1947 and February 1989. The district was named after the town of Chavakachcheri in Jaffna District, Northern Province. Kilinochchi Electoral District was carved out of the southern part of the district in March 1960. The 1978 Constitution of Sri Lanka introduced the proportional representation electoral system for electing members of Parliament. The existing 160 mainly single-member electoral districts were replaced with 22 multi-member electoral districts. Chavakachcheri electoral district was replaced by the Jaffna multi-member electoral district at the 1989 general elections, the first under the PR system, though Chavakachcheri continues to be a polling division of the multi-member electoral district.

== Members of Parliament ==
Key

ACTC ITAK TULF

Election	Member	Party	Term
1947	V. Kumaraswamy	All Ceylon Tamil Congress	1947-1956
1952	V. Kumaraswamy	All Ceylon Tamil Congress	1947-1956
1956	V. N. Navaratnam	Illankai Tamil Arasu Kachchi	1956-1977
1960 (March)	V. N. Navaratnam	Illankai Tamil Arasu Kachchi	1956-1977
1960 (July)	V. N. Navaratnam	Illankai Tamil Arasu Kachchi	1956-1977
1965	V. N. Navaratnam	Illankai Tamil Arasu Kachchi	1956-1977
1970	V. N. Navaratnam	Illankai Tamil Arasu Kachchi	1956-1977
1977	V. N. Navaratnam	Tamil United Liberation Front	1977-1989

== Elections ==
=== 1947 Parliamentary General Election ===
Results of the 1st parliamentary election held between 23 August 1947 and 20 September 1947:

Candidate	Party	Symbol	Votes	%
V. Kumaraswamy	All Ceylon Tamil Congress	Pair of Scales	11,813	85.51%
C. R. Thambiah	United National Party	House	2,002	14.49%
Valid Votes			13,815	100.00%
Rejected Votes			186	
Total Polled			14,001	
Registered Electors			28,377	
Turnout			49.34%	

=== 1952 Parliamentary General Election ===
Results of the 2nd parliamentary election held between 24 May 1952 and 30 May 1952:

Candidate	Party	Symbol	Votes	%
V. Kumaraswamy	All Ceylon Tamil Congress	Pair of Scales	14,801	72.33%
Arunachalam Namasivayam	Illankai Tamil Arasu Kachchi	Bicycle	5,663	27.67%
Valid Votes			20,464	100.00%
Rejected Votes			168	
Total Polled			20,632	
Registered Electors			30,692	
Turnout			67.22%	

=== 1956 Parliamentary General Election ===
Results of the 3rd parliamentary election held between 5 April 1956 and 10 April 1956:

Candidate	Party	Symbol	Votes	%
V. N. Navaratnam	Illankai Tamil Arasu Kachchi	House	15,952	64.77%
V. Kumarasamy		Pair of Scales	8,677	35.23%
Valid Votes			24,629	100.00%
Rejected Votes			206	
Total Polled			24,835	
Registered Electors			35,922	
Turnout			66.14%	

=== 1960 (March) Parliamentary General Election ===
Results of the 4th parliamentary election held on 19 March 1960:

Candidate	Party	Symbol	Votes	%
V. N. Navaratnam	Illankai Tamil Arasu Kachchi	House	13,907	65.26%
V. Kumaraswamy	All Ceylon Tamil Congress	Bicycle	6,930	32.52%
A. S. Kanagaratnam	Lanka Sama Samaja Party	Key	473	2.22%
Valid Votes			21,310	100.00%
Rejected Votes			173	
Total Polled			21,483	
Registered Electors			25,822	
Turnout			83.20%	

=== 1960 (July) Parliamentary General Election ===
Results of the 5th parliamentary election held on 20 July 1960:

Candidate	Party	Symbol	Votes	%
V. N. Navaratnam	Illankai Tamil Arasu Kachchi	House	14,799	86.00%
S. K. Thiravianayagam	All Ceylon Tamil Congress	Bicycle	2,410	14.00%
Valid Votes			17,209	100.00%
Rejected Votes			135	
Total Polled			17,344	
Registered Electors			25,822	
Turnout			67.17%	

=== 1965 Parliamentary General Election ===
Results of the 6th parliamentary election held on 22 March 1965:

Candidate	Party	Symbol	Votes	%
V. N. Navaratnam	Illankai Tamil Arasu Kachchi	House	16,316	69.41%
M. Sivananthan	All Ceylon Tamil Congress	Bicycle	7,191	30.59%
Valid Votes			23,507	100.00%
Rejected Votes			220	
Total Polled			23,727	
Registered Electors			30,452	
Turnout			77.92%	

=== 1970 Parliamentary General Election ===
Results of the 7th parliamentary election held on 27 May 1970:

Candidate	Party	Symbol	Votes	%
V. N. Navaratnam	Illankai Tamil Arasu Kachchi	House	15,473	54.49%
V. Kumaraswamy	All Ceylon Tamil Congress	Bicycle	12,921	45.51%
Valid Votes			28,394	100.00%
Rejected Votes			84	
Total Polled			28,478	
Registered Electors			33,072	
Turnout			86.11%	

=== 1977 Parliamentary General Election ===
Results of the 8th parliamentary election held on 21 July 1977:

Candidate	Party	Symbol	Votes	%
V. N. Navaratnam	Tamil United Liberation Front	Sun	20,028	63.27%
V. Kumaraswamy	Independent	Pair of Scales	10,810	34.15%
S. P. Mailvaganam		Eye	419	1.32%
Kandiah Asai Jerome	Independent	Omnibus	289	0.91%
Sathasivam Nadarajah		Lamp	111	0.35%
Valid Votes			31,657	100.00%
Rejected Votes			91	
Total Polled			31,748	
Registered Electors			36,959	
Turnout			85.90%	

V. N. Navaratnam and all other TULF MPs boycotted Parliament from the middle of 1983 for a number of reasons: they were under pressure from Sri Lankan Tamil militants not to stay in Parliament beyond their normal six-year term; the Sixth Amendment to the Constitution of Sri Lanka required them to swear an oath unconditionally renouncing support for a separate state; and the Black July riots in which up to 3,000 Tamils were murdered by Sinhalese mobs. After three months of absence, Navaratnam forfeited his seat in Parliament on 22 October 1983.
