= P. Kandiah =

Ceylon Tamil academic, teacher, politician and Member of Parliament

Hon. P. Kandiah
- பொன். கந்தையா

Member of the Ceylonese Parliament for Point Pedro
- In office 1956–1960
- Preceded by: T. Ramalingam
- Succeeded by: K. Thurairatnam

Personal details
- Born: 1 July 1914
- Died: September 1960 (aged 46)
- Party: Communist Party of Ceylon
- Education: Ceylon University College; University of Cambridge; University of Oxford
- Profession: Academic, teacher
- Ethnicity: Ceylon Tamil

Ponnambalam Kandiah was a Ceylon Tamil (Tamil: பொன்னம்பலம் கந்தையா; 1 July 1914 – September 1960) was a Ceylon Tamil academic, teacher, politician and Member of Parliament.

== Early life and family ==
Kandiah was born on 1 July 1914. He was the son of Ponnambalam from Puloly in northern Ceylon. He was educated at Jaffna Hindu College. He later joined the Ceylon University College, graduating in 1935 with a BA degree. He received a scholarship to study at Trinity Hall, Cambridge and after two years he graduated with a MA degree in economics and oriental languages. He then studied for a further two years at University of Oxford.

Kandiah married Parameswari from Nelliady. They had a daughter – Radha.

== Career ==
After returning to Ceylon he served as a lecturer at Ceylon University College. He was Deputy Librarian at University of Ceylon, Peradeniya for a period. He later taught at Manipay Hindu College.

Whilst at Cambridge Kandiah met leftist students from Ceylon including Pieter Keuneman, S. A. Wickramasinghe and A. Vaidialingam. He came under the influence of communism and Marxism. Kandiah, Keuneman and Vaidialingam were members of the Communist Party of Great Britain. After returning to Ceylon Kandiah and the other young leftists founded the United Socialist Party in 1941 and its successor the Communist Party of Ceylon (CPC) in 1943. Kandiah was the CPC's candidate in Point Pedro at the 1947 and 1952 parliamentary elections but on each occasion was defeated by the All Ceylon Tamil Congress (ACTC) candidate T. Ramalingam. He however won the 1956 parliamentary election and entered Parliament. A delimitation commission in the late 1950s created a new electoral district for Udupiddy from parts of Point Pedro. Kandiah stood as the CPC candidate in the new electoral district at the March 1960 parliamentary election but was defeated by the ACTC candidate M. Sivasithamparam.

Kandiah died in September 1960 aged 46.
