= Kilinochchi Electoral District =

Electoral district of Sri Lanka

Kilinochchi Electoral District was an electoral district of Sri Lanka between March 1960 and February 1989. The district was named after the town of Kilinochchi in Kilinochchi District, Northern Province. The district was carved out of the southern part of Chavakacheri Electoral District in March 1960. The 1978 Constitution of Sri Lanka introduced the proportional representation electoral system for electing members of Parliament. The existing 160 mainly single-member electoral districts were replaced with 22 multi-member electoral districts. Kilinochchi electoral district was replaced by the Jaffna multi-member electoral district at the 1989 general elections, the first under the PR system, though Kilinochchi continues to be a polling division of the multi-member electoral district.

== Members of Parliament ==
Key

ACTC ITAK TULF

Election	Member	Party	Term
1960 (March)	A. Sivasunderam	Illankai Tamil Arasu Kachchi	1960-1965
1960 (July)	A. Sivasunderam	Illankai Tamil Arasu Kachchi	1960-1965
1965	K. P. Ratnam	Illankai Tamil Arasu Kachchi	1965-1970
1970	V. Anandasangaree	All Ceylon Tamil Congress	1970-1977
1977	V. Anandasangaree	Tamil United Liberation Front	1977-1989

== Elections ==
=== 1960 (March) Parliamentary General Election ===
Results of the 4th parliamentary election held on 19 March 1960:

Candidate	Party	Symbol	Votes	%
A. Sivasunderam	Illankai Tamil Arasu Kachchi	House	3,741	41.76%
Anton C. Ponnampalam	Independent	Sewing Machine	2,582	28.82%
P. Arumugam		Cockerel	1,386	15.47%
V. Anandasangaree	Lanka Sama Samaja Party	Key	1,114	12.43%
C. Saravanamuttu		Sun	136	1.52%
Valid Votes			8,959	100.00%
Rejected Votes			120	
Total Polled			9,079	
Registered Electors			13,991	
Turnout			64.89%	

=== 1960 (July) Parliamentary General Election ===
Results of the 5th parliamentary election held on 20 July 1960:

Candidate	Party	Symbol	Votes	%
A. Sivasunderam	Illankai Tamil Arasu Kachchi	House	5,338	72.64%
V. Anandasangaree	Lanka Sama Samaja Party	Key	2,011	27.36%
Valid Votes			7,349	100.00%
Rejected Votes			88	
Total Polled			7,437	
Registered Electors			13,991	
Turnout			53.16%	

=== 1965 Parliamentary General Election ===
Results of the 6th parliamentary election held on 22 March 1965:

Candidate	Party	Symbol	Votes	%
K. P. Ratnam	Illankai Tamil Arasu Kachchi	House	5,922	44.69%
V. Coomaraswamy	All Ceylon Tamil Congress	Bicycle	4,076	30.76%
V. Anandasangaree	Lanka Sama Samaja Party	Key	1,804	13.62%
C. Saravanamuttu		Tree	831	6.27%
K. Selvanayagam		Pair of Scales	390	2.94%
N. S. Sethukavalar		Omnibus	130	0.98%
R. Vethanayagam		Umbrella	97	0.73%
Valid Votes			13,250	100.00%
Rejected Votes			116	
Total Polled			13,366	
Registered Electors			18,738	
Turnout			71.33%	

=== 1970 Parliamentary General Election ===
Results of the 7th parliamentary election held on 27 May 1970:

Candidate	Party	Symbol	Votes	%
V. Anandasangaree	All Ceylon Tamil Congress	Bicycle	9,049	50.19%
M. Alalasundaram	Illankai Tamil Arasu Kachchi	House	8,392	46.55%
K. A. Jerome	Independent	Pair of Scales	253	1.40%
A. Sivasunderam		Eye	196	1.09%
K. Kanagaratnam	Lanka Sama Samaja Party	Key	139	0.77%
Valid Votes			18,029	100.00%
Rejected Votes			60	
Total Polled			18,089	
Registered Electors			23,793	
Turnout			76.03%	

=== 1977 Parliamentary General Election ===
Results of the 8th parliamentary election held on 21 July 1977:

Candidate	Party	Symbol	Votes	%
V. Anandasangaree	Tamil United Liberation Front	Sun	15,607	73.42%
C. Kumarasuriar	Sri Lanka Freedom Party	Hand	4,006	18.84%
N. Kanagasuriar		Elephant	1,497	7.04%
I. Gnanasangary		Pair of Scales	76	0.36%
Sinnathamby Ganesu		Eye	72	0.34%
Valid Votes			21,258	100.00%
Rejected Votes			56	
Total Polled			21,314	
Registered Electors			26,670	
Turnout			79.92%	

V. Anandasangaree and all other TULF MPs boycotted Parliament from the middle of 1983 for a number of reasons: they were under pressure from Sri Lankan Tamil militants not to stay in Parliament beyond their normal six-year term; the Sixth Amendment to the Constitution of Sri Lanka required them to swear an oath unconditionally renouncing support for a separate state; and the Black July riots in which up to 3,000 Tamils were murdered by Sinhalese mobs. After three months of absence, Anandasangaree forfeited his seat in Parliament on 22 October 1983.
