= K. P. Ratnam =

Sri Lankan Tamil academic and politician

Hon. K. P. Ratnam MP
- கா. பொ. இரத்தினம்

Member of the Ceylonese Parliament for Kilinochchi
- In office 1965–1970
- Preceded by: A. Sivasunderam
- Succeeded by: V. Anandasangaree

Member of the Ceylonese Parliament for Kayts
- In office 1970–1983
- Preceded by: V. Navaratnam

Personal details
- Born: 10 March 1914 Velanai, Ceylon
- Died: 20 December 2010 (aged 96) Colombo, Sri Lanka
- Party: Illankai Tamil Arasu Kachchi
- Other political affiliations: Tamil United Liberation Front
- Education: University of London; University of Madras
- Profession: Academic

Kaarthigesar Ponnambalam Ratnam (Tamil: கார்த்திகேசு பொன்னம்பலம் இரத்தினம்; 10 March 1914 – 20 December 2010) was a Sri Lankan Tamil academic, politician and Member of Parliament.

== Early life and family ==
Ratnam was born on 10 March 1914 in Velanai on the island of Kayts in northern Ceylon. He was educated at Velanai Anglo-Vernacular School and Union College, Tellippalai. He excelled in Tamil language and Tamil literature at school. He became a pundit in 1933 and vidvan in 1942.

Ratnam was awarded BA (Hons) degree from the University of London in 1945. He later received a Bachelor of Oriental Languages degree and MA (1952) degree from the University of Madras in India.

Ratnam married Sinthamany, daughter of P. Vaitilingam. They had a son - S. Nimalan.

== Career ==
Ratnam joined the teaching profession and served as headmaster of the Moolai Senior Secondary School between 1934 and 1940. He became assistant master at Kopay Teacher Training College in 1941. In 1942 he was appointed Inspector of Schools. Between 1943 and 1956 he was a lecturer in Tamil at Maharagama Training College. Later he spent eight years as a research officer in the Official Languages Department in Colombo. He was a visiting lecturer at Navalar Hall, Colombo from 1958 to 1963. He then joined the University of Malaya in 1964 as lecturer in Indian Studies.

After retirement Ratnam entered politics. He stood as the candidate of Illankai Tamil Arasu Kachchi (ITAK), commonly known as Federal Party, in Kilinochchi at the 1965 parliamentary election. He won the election and entered Parliament. He stood as ITAK's candidate in Kayts at the 1970 parliamentary election. He won the election and re-entered Parliament.

On 14 May 1972 the ITAK, All Ceylon Tamil Congress, Ceylon Workers' Congress, Eelath Thamilar Otrumai Munnani and All Ceylon Tamil Conference formed the Tamil United Front, later renamed Tamil United Liberation Front (TULF). On 21 May 1976 Ratnam was delivering leaflets along with other leading Tamil politicians (A. Amirthalingam, V. N. Navaratnam, M. Sivasithamparam and K. Thurairatnam) when they were all arrested on government orders. Sivasithamparam was released but the others were taken to Colombo and tried for sedition. All the defendants were acquitted on 10 February 1977 after a famous trial at bar case in which around 70 leading Tamil lawyers, including S. J. V. Chelvanayakam and G. G. Ponnambalam, represented the defence.

Ratnam was the TULF's candidate in Kayts at the 1977 parliamentary election and was re-elected. Ratnam and all other TULF MPs boycotted Parliament from the middle of 1983 for a number of reasons: they were under pressure from Sri Lankan Tamil militants not to stay in Parliament beyond their normal six-year term; the Sixth Amendment to the Constitution of Sri Lanka required them to swear an oath unconditionally renouncing support for a separate state; and the Black July riots in which up to 3,000 Tamils were killed by Sinhalese mobs. After three months of absence, Ratnam forfeited his seat in Parliament on 22 October 1983.

== Later life ==
Ratnam was president of Colombo Tamil Sangam (1958–61), Ulaka Tamil Marai Kallakam and editor of the Tamil World (1965). He was also a vice-president of the TULF. He represented the All Ceylon Tamil Writers’ Association at the Asian Writers’ Conference held in 1957 in New Delhi; attended the 25th International Congress of Orientalists held in Moscow in 1960; and the 26th Congress of Orientalists held in New Delhi in 1964. He has written more than 12 books and contributed numerous articles on literary and cultural topics.

Ratnam moved to India in 1985. He returned to Sri Lanka in 2003 and lived with his children in Wellawatte, Colombo. He died on 20 December 2010 at his home in Colombo.

== Works ==
- Thavaram Illai (1948)
- Ilankayil Inpath Tamil (1956)
- Nootandugalil Tamil (1961)
