= Point Pedro Electoral District =

Sri Lankan electoral district (1947-1989)

Coordinates: 9.8167°N 80.2333°E

Point Pedro Electoral District was an electoral district of Sri Lanka between August 1947 and February 1989. The district was named after the town of Point Pedro in Jaffna District, Northern Province. Udupiddy Electoral District was carved out of the western part of the district in March 1960. The 1978 Constitution of Sri Lanka introduced the proportional representation electoral system for electing members of Parliament. The existing 160 mainly single-member electoral districts were replaced with 22 multi-member electoral districts. Point Pedro electoral district was replaced by the Jaffna multi-member electoral district at the 1989 general elections, the first under the PR system, though Point Pedro continues to be a polling division of the multi-member electoral district.

== Members of Parliament ==
Key

ACTC Communist Party ITAK TULF

Election	Member	Party	Term
1947	T. Ramalingam	All Ceylon Tamil Congress	1947-1952
1952	T. Ramalingam	All Ceylon Tamil Congress	1952-1956
1956	P. Kandiah	Communist Party of Ceylon	1956-1960
1960 (March)	K. Thurairatnam	Illankai Tamil Arasu Kachchi	1960-1960
1960 (July)	K. Thurairatnam	Illankai Tamil Arasu Kachchi	1960-1965
1965	K. Thurairatnam	Illankai Tamil Arasu Kachchi	1965-1970
1970	K. Thurairatnam	Illankai Tamil Arasu Kachchi	1970-1977
1977	K. Thurairatnam	Tamil United Liberation Front	1977-1989

== Elections ==
=== 1947 Parliamentary General Election ===
Results of the 1st parliamentary election held between 23 August 1947 and 20 September 1947:

Candidate	Party	Symbol	Votes	%
T. Ramalingam	All Ceylon Tamil Congress	Pair of Scales	10,396	43.51%
S. "Jeyam" Tharamakulasingham	Lanka Sama Samaja Party	Eye	6,108	25.56%
V. Suppiah	Independent	Spoon	3,897	16.31%
P. Kandiah	Communist Party	Hand	3,492	14.62%
Valid Votes			23,893	100.00%
Rejected Votes			446	
Total Polled			24,339	
Registered Electors			41,682	
Turnout			58.39%	

=== 1952 Parliamentary General Election ===
Results of the 2nd parliamentary election held between 24 May 1952 and 30 May 1952:

Candidate	Party	Symbol	Votes	%
T. Ramalingam	All Ceylon Tamil Congress	Eye	11,609	41.54%
P. Kandiah	Communist Party	Bicycle	8,617	30.83%
K. C. Nadarajah	Independent	Hand	5,512	19.72%
Coomaraswamy Balasingham	Lanka Sama Samaja Party	Wheel	2,208	7.90%
Valid Votes			27,946	100.00%
Rejected Votes			494	
Total Polled			28,440	
Registered Electors			43,219	
Turnout			65.80%	

=== 1956 Parliamentary General Election ===
Results of the 3rd parliamentary election held between 5 April 1956 and 10 April 1956:

Candidate	Party	Symbol	Votes	%
P. Kandiah	Communist Party	Star	14,381	50.81%
Murugesu Sivasithamparam	Independent	Umbrella	8,064	28.49%
K. Thurairatnam	Illankai Tamil Arasu Kachchi	House	5,859	20.70%
Valid Votes			28,304	100.00%
Rejected Votes			317	
Total Polled			28,621	
Registered Electors			44,603	
Turnout			64.17%	

=== 1960 (March) Parliamentary General Election ===
Results of the 4th parliamentary election held on 19 March 1960:

Candidate	Party	Symbol	Votes	%
K. Thurairatnam	Illankai Tamil Arasu Kachchi	House	5,679	40.34%
N. Nadarajah	All Ceylon Tamil Congress	Bicycle	2,521	17.91%
T. Jayadevan	Lanka Sama Samaja Party	Key	2,101	14.92%
K. Senathirajah	Communist Party	Star	1,552	11.02%
S. Sundaralingam	Independent	Ship	1,226	8.71%
S. Kandiah		Sun	1,000	7.10%
Valid Votes			14,079	100.00%
Rejected Votes			152	
Total Polled			14,231	
Registered Electors			19,408	
Turnout			73.33%	

=== 1960 (July) Parliamentary General Election ===
Results of the 5th parliamentary election held on 20 July 1960:

Candidate	Party	Symbol	Votes	%
K. Thurairatnam	Illankai Tamil Arasu Kachchi	House	8,226	67.46%
N. Nadarajah	All Ceylon Tamil Congress	Bicycle	3,968	32.54%
Valid Votes			12,194	100.00%
Rejected Votes			129	
Total Polled			12,323	
Registered Electors			19,408	
Turnout			63.49%	

=== 1965 Parliamentary General Election ===
Results of the 6th parliamentary election held on 22 March 1965:

Candidate	Party	Symbol	Votes	%
K. Thurairatnam	Illankai Tamil Arasu Kachchi	House	7,564	46.24%
N. Nadarajah	All Ceylon Tamil Congress	Bicycle	6,614	40.43%
K. Motilal Nehru	Communist Party	Star	2,180	13.33%
Valid Votes			16,358	100.00%
Rejected Votes			94	
Total Polled			16,452	
Registered Electors			22,972	
Turnout			71.62%	

=== 1970 Parliamentary General Election ===
Results of the 7th parliamentary election held on 27 May 1970:

Candidate	Party	Symbol	Votes	%
K. Thurairatnam	Illankai Tamil Arasu Kachchi	House	9,217	48.50%
N. Nadarajah	All Ceylon Tamil Congress	Bicycle	8,902	46.85%
P. Kanagarasa		Pair of Scales	579	3.05%
A. Visagaratnam		Cockerel	305	1.61%
Valid Votes			19,003	100.00%
Rejected Votes			86	
Total Polled			19,089	
Registered Electors			24,006	
Turnout			79.52%	

=== 1977 Parliamentary General Election ===
Results of the 8th parliamentary election held on 21 July 1977:

Candidate	Party	Symbol	Votes	%
K. Thurairatnam	Tamil United Liberation Front	Sun	12,989	55.77%
N. Nadarajah	Independent	Umbrella	6,419	27.56%
M. P. Veeravagu	Independent	Pair of Scales	3,065	13.16%
K. T. Rajasingham		Eye	614	2.64%
K. S. Muthukumarasamy		Ship	204	0.88%
Valid Votes			23,291	100.00%
Rejected Votes			75	
Total Polled			23,366	
Registered Electors			28,447	
Turnout			82.14%	

K. Thurairatnam and all other TULF MPs boycotted Parliament from the middle of 1983 for a number of reasons: they were under pressure from Sri Lankan Tamil militants not to stay in Parliament beyond their normal six-year term; the Sixth Amendment to the Constitution of Sri Lanka required them to swear an oath unconditionally renouncing support for a separate state; and the Black July riots in which up to 3,000 Tamils were murdered by Sinhalese mobs. After three months of absence, Thurairatnam forfeited his seat in Parliament on 5 January 1984.
