= Douglas Liyanage =

Sri Lankan civil servant

Don John Francis Douglas Liyanage, CCS was a former Sri Lankan civil servant. He was the former Secretary to the Ministry of State in the early 1980s.

Having gained his BSc from the University of Colombo, Liyanage gained admission and was appointed to the Ceylon Civil Service by the Public Service Commission in April 1950. As a cadet he served in the General Treasury, Nuwara Eliya Kachcheri, Mannar Kachcheri and was transferred to the Ministry of Home Affairs and Rural Development. Promoted to Officer Class 2, in August 1952, he was appointed Additional Assistant (Hambanthota) to the Government Agent of the Southern Province.

In 1963 he was named as the first accused of the attempted coup d'état in 1962 by the state prosecution. It was claimed by the state that he was the mastermind behind the attempted coup d'état. Even though he was convicted along with 11 others accused in 1963, the Privy Council, in its ruling given in December 1965, held the Special Act of 1962 ultra vires of the Ceylon constitution and said that the Act had denied fair trial. According to the Privy Council, the law had been specially enacted to convict the men; under trial they did not have the protections that they would have had under general criminal law. It acquitted all the eleven.

== See also ==
- N. Q. Dias
