= Udupiddy Electoral District =

Owner of Youths of Pokhariya

Udupiddy Electoral District was an electoral district of Sri Lanka between March 1960 and February 1989. The district was named after the town of Udupiddy in Jaffna District, Northern Province. The district was carved out of the western part of Point Pedro Electoral District in March 1960. The 1978 Constitution of Sri Lanka introduced the proportional representation electoral system for electing members of Parliament. The existing 160 mainly single-member electoral districts were replaced with 22 multi-member electoral districts. Udupiddy electoral district was replaced by the Jaffna multi-member electoral district at the 1989 general elections, the first under the PR system, though Udupiddy continues to be a polling division of the multi-member electoral district.

== Members of Parliament ==
Key

ACTC ITAK TULF

Election	Member	Party	Term
1960 (March)	M. Sivasithamparam	All Ceylon Tamil Congress	1960-1960
1960 (July)	M. Sivasithamparam	All Ceylon Tamil Congress	1960-1965
1965	M. Sivasithamparam	All Ceylon Tamil Congress	1965-1970
1970	K. Jeyakody	Illankai Tamil Arasu Kachchi	1970-1977
1977	T. Rasalingam	Tamil United Liberation Front	1977-1989

== Elections ==
=== 1960 (March) Parliamentary General Election ===
Results of the 4th parliamentary election held on 19 March 1960:

Candidate	Party	Symbol	Votes	%
M. Sivasithamparam	All Ceylon Tamil Congress	Bicycle	7,365	34.70%
P. Kandiah	Communist Party	Star	5,427	25.57%
R. R. Dharmaratnam	Lanka Sama Samaja Party	Key	4,573	21.55%
K. Jeyakody	Illankai Tamil Arasu Kachchi	House	3,860	18.19%
Valid Votes			21,225	100.00%
Rejected Votes			195	
Total Polled			21,420	
Registered Electors			28,620	
Turnout			74.84%	

=== 1960 (July) Parliamentary General Election ===
Results of the 5th parliamentary election held on 20 July 1960:

Candidate	Party	Symbol	Votes	%
M. Sivasithamparam	All Ceylon Tamil Congress	Bicycle	9,080	44.80%
K. Jeyakody	Illankai Tamil Arasu Kachchi	House	7,741	38.20%
S. Jeyasingham	Communist Party	Star	3,445	17.00%
Valid Votes			20,266	100.00%
Rejected Votes			151	
Total Polled			20,417	
Registered Electors			28,620	
Turnout			71.34%	

=== 1965 Parliamentary General Election ===
Results of the 6th parliamentary election held on 22 March 1965:

Candidate	Party	Symbol	Votes	%
M. Sivasithamparam	All Ceylon Tamil Congress	Bicycle	12,009	46.67%
K. Jeyakody	Illankai Tamil Arasu Kachchi	House	8,452	32.85%
R. R. Dharmaratnam	Lanka Sama Samaja Party	Key	5,268	20.47%
Valid Votes			25,729	100.00%
Rejected Votes			137	
Total Polled			25,866	
Registered Electors			34,275	
Turnout			75.47%	

=== 1970 Parliamentary General Election ===
Results of the 7th parliamentary election held on 27 May 1970:

Candidate	Party	Symbol	Votes	%
K. Jeyakody	Illankai Tamil Arasu Kachchi	House	12,918	46.54%
M. Sivasithamparam	All Ceylon Tamil Congress	Bicycle	11,662	42.02%
P. Kumaraswamy	Communist Party	Star	1,149	4.14%
K. Pillainar	Independent	Pair of Scales	724	2.61%
R. R. Dharmaratnam	Lanka Sama Samaja Party	Key	712	2.57%
S. Sundaram	Independent	Umbrella	591	2.13%
Valid Votes			27,756	100.00%
Rejected Votes			179	
Total Polled			27,935	
Registered Electors			34,741	
Turnout			80.41%	

=== 1977 Parliamentary General Election ===
Results of the 8th parliamentary election held on 21 July 1977:

Candidate	Party	Symbol	Votes	%
T. Rasalingam	Tamil United Liberation Front	Sun	18,768	63.44%
R. R. Dharmaratnam	Independent	Lamp	4,021	13.59%
C. Motilal Nehru		Pair of Scales	2,798	9.46%
S. Sundaram		Omnibus	1,478	5.00%
K. C. Mahathevan		Umbrella	1,188	4.02%
K. Pillainar		Ladder	517	1.75%
M. Thurairajah		Eye	437	1.48%
P. Kanagarasa		Chair	251	0.85%
M. Gnanachandran		Clock	125	0.42%
Valid Votes			29,583	100.00%
Rejected Votes			123	
Total Polled			29,706	
Registered Electors			36,955	
Turnout			80.38%	

T. Rasalingam and all other TULF MPs boycotted Parliament from the middle of 1983 for a number of reasons: they were under pressure from Sri Lankan Tamil militants not to stay in Parliament beyond their normal six-year term; the Sixth Amendment to the Constitution of Sri Lanka required them to swear an oath unconditionally renouncing support for a separate state; and the Black July riots in which up to 3,000 Tamils were murdered by Sinhalese mobs. After three months of absence, Rasalingam forfeited his seat in Parliament on 21 October 1983.
