= Kayts Electoral District =

Electoral district of Sri Lanka

Coordinates: 9.2167°N 79.8667°E

Kayts Electoral District was an electoral district of Sri Lanka between August 1947 and February 1989. The district was named after the island of Kayts in Jaffna District, Northern Province. The 1978 Constitution of Sri Lanka introduced the proportional representation electoral system for electing members of Parliament. The existing 160 mainly single-member electoral districts were replaced with 22 multi-member electoral districts. Kayts electoral district was replaced by the Jaffna multi-member electoral district at the 1989 general elections, the first under the PR system, though Kayts continues to be a polling division of the multi-member electoral district.

== Members of Parliament ==
Key

Independent ACTC ITAK TULF

Election	Member	Party	Term
1947	Alfred Thambiayah	Independent	1947-1952
1952	Alfred Thambiayah	All Ceylon Tamil Congress	1952-1956
1956	V. A. Kandiah	Illankai Tamil Arasu Kachchi	1956-1963
1960 (March)	V. A. Kandiah	Illankai Tamil Arasu Kachchi	1956-1963
1960 (July)	V. A. Kandiah	Illankai Tamil Arasu Kachchi	1956-1963
1963	V. Navaratnam	Illankai Tamil Arasu Kachchi	1963-1970
1965	V. Navaratnam	Illankai Tamil Arasu Kachchi	1963-1970
1970	K. P. Ratnam	Illankai Tamil Arasu Kachchi	1970-1977
1977	K. P. Ratnam	Tamil United Liberation Front	1977-1989

== Elections ==
=== 1947 Parliamentary General Election ===
Results of the 1st parliamentary election held between 23 August 1947 and 20 September 1947:

Candidate	Party	Symbol	Votes	%
Alfred Thambiayah	Independent	Pair of Scales	5,552	31.01%
A. V. Kulasingham	All Ceylon Tamil Congress	Hand	5,230	29.21%
K. Ambalavner		Umbrella	3,701	20.67%
Waithilingam Duraiswamy	Independent	Bicycle	2,438	13.62%
J. C. Amerasingham		Lamp	981	5.48%
Valid Votes			17,902	100.00%
Rejected Votes			502	
Total Polled			18,404	
Registered Electors			33,045	
Turnout			55.69%	

=== 1952 Parliamentary General Election ===
Results of the 2nd parliamentary election held between 24 May 1952 and 30 May 1952:

Candidate	Party	Symbol	Votes	%
Alfred Thambiayah	All Ceylon Tamil Congress	Elephant	9,517	43.44%
A. Thiagarajah	Independent	Pair of Scales	5,649	25.78%
Clough Balasingham	Independent	Bicycle	5,090	23.23%
V. Navaratnam	Illankai Tamil Arasu Kachchi	Hand	1,420	6.48%
Somasunderam Senathirajah	Independent	Key	234	1.07%
Valid Votes			21,910	100.00%
Rejected Votes			199	
Total Polled			22,109	
Registered Electors			30,138	
Turnout			73.36%	

=== 1956 Parliamentary General Election ===
Results of the 3rd parliamentary election held between 5 April 1956 and 10 April 1956:

Candidate	Party	Symbol	Votes	%
V. A. Kandiah	Illankai Tamil Arasu Kachchi	House	16,308	71.19%
Alfred Thambiayah		Pair of Scales	6,599	28.81%
Valid Votes			22,907	100.00%
Rejected Votes			189	
Total Polled			23,096	
Registered Electors			32,410	
Turnout			71.26%	

=== 1960 (March) Parliamentary General Election ===
Results of the 4th parliamentary election held on 19 March 1960:

Candidate	Party	Symbol	Votes	%
V. A. Kandiah	Illankai Tamil Arasu Kachchi	House	10,820	56.61%
Alfred Thambiayah	Independent	Ship	7,574	39.63%
V. V. Nallathamby	Lanka Sama Samaja Party	Key	719	3.76%
Valid Votes			19,113	100.00%
Rejected Votes			186	
Total Polled			19,299	
Registered Electors			25,616	
Turnout			75.34%	

=== 1960 (July) Parliamentary General Election ===
Results of the 5th parliamentary election held on 20 July 1960:

Candidate	Party	Symbol	Votes	%
V. A. Kandiah	Illankai Tamil Arasu Kachchi	House	12,110	81.93%
S. Senathirajah	All Ceylon Tamil Congress	Ship	2,671	18.07%
Valid Votes			14,781	100.00%
Rejected Votes			151	
Total Polled			14,932	
Registered Electors			25,616	
Turnout			58.29%	

V. A. Kandiah died on 4 June 1963.

=== 1963 Parliamentary By-Election ===
Results of the parliamentary by-election held in August 1963:

Candidate	Party	Symbol	Votes	%
V. Navaratnam	Illankai Tamil Arasu Kachchi		14,946	76.46%
A. G. Rajasooriyar	Independent		4,602	23.54%
Valid Votes			19,548	100.00%
Rejected Votes			143	
Total Polled			19,691	
Registered Electors			31,473	
Turnout			62.56%	

=== 1965 Parliamentary General Election ===
Results of the 6th parliamentary election held on 22 March 1965:

Candidate	Party	Symbol	Votes	%
V. Navaratnam	Illankai Tamil Arasu Kachchi	House	13,558	69.98%
N. T. Sivagnanam	All Ceylon Tamil Congress	Bicycle	5,816	30.02%
Valid Votes			19,374	100.00%
Rejected Votes			170	
Total Polled			19,544	
Registered Electors			31,785	
Turnout			61.49%	

=== 1970 Parliamentary General Election ===
Results of the 7th parliamentary election held on 27 May 1970:

Candidate	Party	Symbol	Votes	%
K. P. Ratnam	Illankai Tamil Arasu Kachchi	House	13,079	53.35%
P. Kathiravelu	Independent	Cockerel	5,013	20.45%
V. Navaratnam	Independent	Pair of Scales	4,758	19.41%
N. T. Sivagnanam	All Ceylon Tamil Congress	Bicycle	1,667	6.80%
Valid Votes			24,517	100.00%
Rejected Votes			95	
Total Polled			24,612	
Registered Electors			32,015	
Turnout			76.88%	

=== 1977 Parliamentary General Election ===
Results of the 8th parliamentary election held on 21 July 1977:

Candidate	Party	Symbol	Votes	%
K. P. Ratnam	Tamil United Liberation Front	Sun	17,640	64.05%
V. Navaratnam	Independent	Pair of Scales	8,673	31.49%
M. Amirthalingam	Independent	Elephant	661	2.40%
Yogendra Duraiswamy	Independent	Chair	279	1.01%
Thambiah Paranirupasingam	Independent	Bell	185	0.67%
K. Kanagaratnam	Independent	Key	103	0.37%
Valid Votes			27,541	100.00%
Rejected Votes			132	
Total Polled			27,673	
Registered Electors			36,372	
Turnout			76.08%	

K. P. Ratnam and all other TULF MPs boycotted Parliament from the middle of 1983 for a number of reasons: they were under pressure from Sri Lankan Tamil militants not to stay in Parliament beyond their normal six-year term; the Sixth Amendment to the Constitution of Sri Lanka required them to swear an oath unconditionally renouncing support for a separate state; and the Black July riots in which up to 3,000 Tamils were murdered by Sinhalese mobs. After three months of absence, Ratnam forfeited his seat in Parliament on 22 October 1983.
