= K. Jeyakody =

Sri Lankan Tamil politician

Hon. K. Jeyakody MP
- க. ஜெயக்கொடி
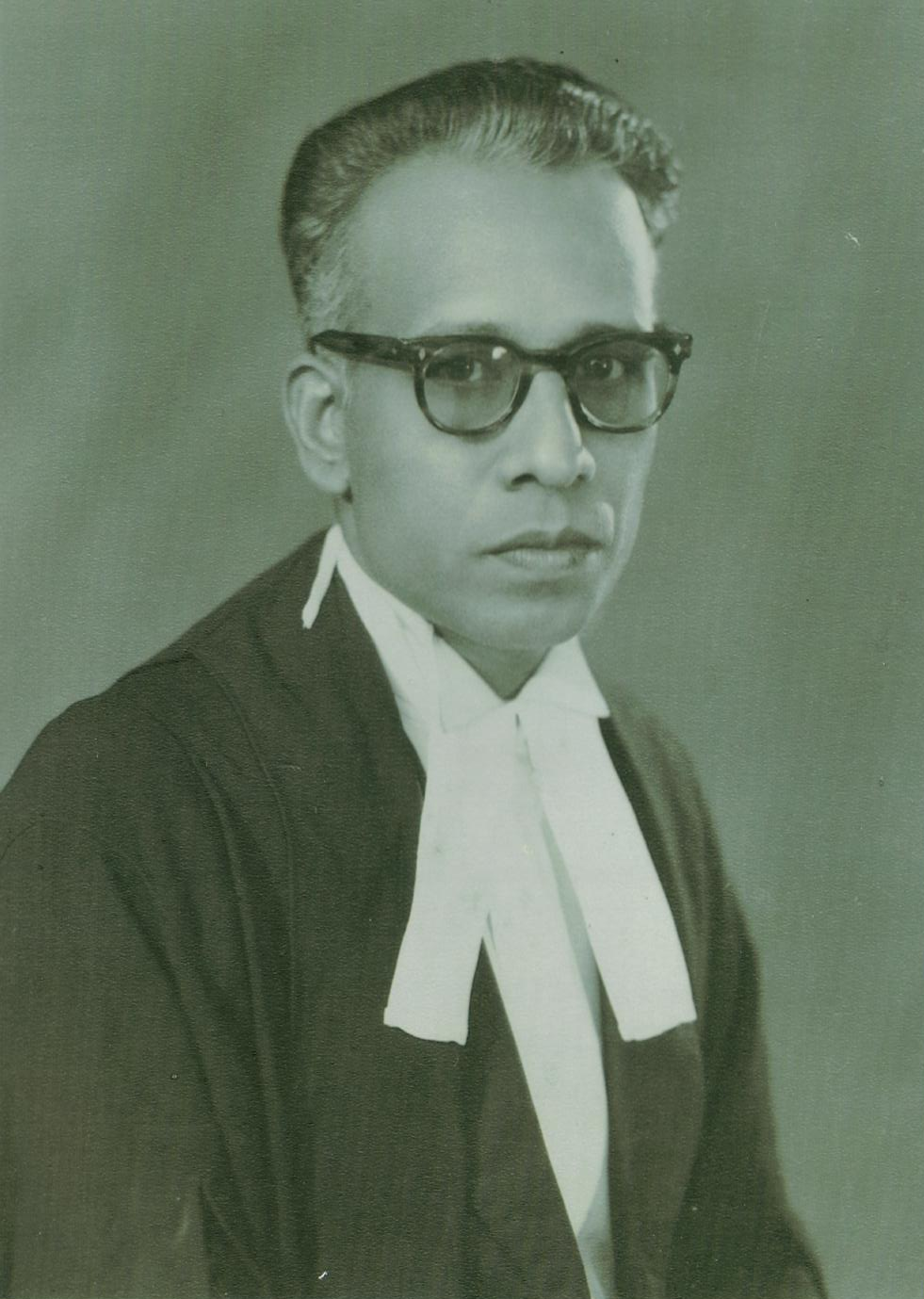

Member of the Ceylonese Parliament for Udupiddy
- In office 1970–1977
- Preceded by: M. Sivasithamparam
- Succeeded by: T. Rasalingam

Personal details
- Born: 29 August 1913
- Party: Illankai Tamil Arasu Kachchi
- Ethnicity: Sri Lankan Tamil

Kandappa Jeyakody (Tamil: கந்தப்பா ஜெயக்கொடி; born 29 August 1913) was a Sri Lankan Tamil politician and Member of Parliament.

Jeyakody was born on 29 August 1913.

Jeyakody contested the March 1960, July 1960 and 1965 parliamentary elections as the Illankai Tamil Arasu Kachchi's (Federal Party) candidate in Udupiddy, but on each occasion was defeated by the All Ceylon Tamil Congress candidate M. Sivasithamparam. He however won the 1970 parliamentary election and entered Parliament.
