= T. Rasalingam =

Sri Lankan Tamil politician

Hon. T. Rasalingam MP

Member of Parliament for Udupiddy
- In office 1977–1983
- Preceded by: K. Jeyakody

Personal details
- Born: 21 November 1933 (age 92)
- Party: Tamil United Liberation Front
- Ethnicity: Sri Lankan Tamil

Thambipillai Rasalingam was a Sri Lankan Tamil politician and Member of Parliament.

Rasalingam was born on 21 November 1933. He was from Vathiry in northern Ceylon and was an education officer.

Rasalingam stood as the Tamil United Liberation Front's candidate for Udupiddy at the 1977 parliamentary election. He won the election and entered Parliament.

Rasalingam and all other TULF MPs boycotted Parliament from the middle of 1983 for a number of reasons: they were under pressure from Sri Lankan Tamil militants not to stay in Parliament beyond their normal six-year term; the Sixth Amendment to the Constitution of Sri Lanka required them to swear an oath unconditionally renouncing support for a separate state; and the Black July riots in which up to 3,000 Tamils were murdered by Sinhalese mobs. After three months of absence, Rasalingam forfeited his seat in Parliament on 21 October 1983.
