= Alfred Thambiayah =

Ceylon Tamil businessman, centenarian, politician and Member of Parliament

Hon. Alfred Thambiayah MP
- அல்பிரட் தம்பிஐயா

Member of the Ceylonese Parliament for Kayts
- In office 1947–1956
- Succeeded by: V. A. Kandiah

Personal details
- Born: 8 November 1903
- Died: October 1, 2009 (aged 105)
- Party: All Ceylon Tamil Congress
- Education: St. Anthony's College; St. Patrick's College; St. Benedict's College; St. Joseph's College
- Occupation: Businessman
- Ethnicity: Ceylon Tamil

Alfred Leo Saverimuthu Thambiayah (Tamil: அல்பிரட் லியோ சவரிமுத்து தம்பிஐயா; (November 10, 1903 – October 1, 2009) was a Ceylon Tamil businessman, centenarian, politician and Member of Parliament.

== Early life and family ==
Thambiayah was born on 8 November 1903 in Karampon on the island of Velanaitivu in northern Ceylon. His father was a ship owner in Kayts. He was educated at St. Anthony's College, Kayts, St. Patrick's College, Jaffna, St. Benedict's College, Colombo and St. Joseph's College, Colombo.

Thambiayah married Rajeswari, daughter of Adigar Sellamuttu. They had two sons (Shivantha and Ravi) and two daughters (Subodhini and Indumathi Renuka).

== Career ==
Thambiayah began his business career aged 21 by leasing the Olympia Cinema. He then went into business with Chittampalam Abraham Gardiner, establishing the successful Ceylon Theatres Ltd. Later on Ceylon Theatres bought Cargills & Millers and Thambiayah served as chairman/managing director of the latter. Thambiayah acquired Cargo Boat Dispatch Company, a shipping company, in 1936 from Harry and John Cosmas. The company grew to control the majority of the business out of the Port of Colombo.

Thambiayah stood as an independent candidate in Kayts at the 1947 parliamentary election. He won the election and entered Parliament. His opponent A. V. Kulasingham filed a legal petition stating that Thambiayah was disqualified from contesting the election as his Cargo Boat Dispatch Company had contracts with the state-owned Colombo Ports Authority. Judge Basanayake found in favour of Kulasingham and declared the Kayts election void. Electoral law didn't allow appeals against the judgement so the United National Party dominated government hurriedly passed the Election Petition Appeal Act No. 1 of 1948. Thambiayah appealed and judges Wijeyewardene, Canekeratne and Windham over ruled Basanayake's judgement and re-instated Thambiayah as the MP for Kayts.

Thambiayah was instrumental in the construction of road links to Velanaitivu from Jaffna Peninsula and Pungudutivu. He also helped build schools, hospitals, roads, dispensaries and post offices on the island.

Thambiayah was re-elected at the 1952 parliamentary election as an All Ceylon Tamil Congress candidate. The ACTC left the UNP government in 1953 but Thambiayah chose to remain with the UNP. Thambiayah, like many Tamil UNP politicians, left the UNP in 1956 over its support of the Sinhala Only policy.

Thambiayah stood for re-election in the constituency at the 1956 and March 1960 parliamentary elections but on each occasion was defeated by the Illankai Tamil Arasu Kachchi (Federal Party) candidate V. A. Kandiah.

Thambiayah's company suffered a set-back when the Port of Colombo was nationalised in 1958. Thambiayah started diversifying his business interests, turning his company into a shipping agency house, taking shareholdings in Hatton National Bank and establishing Hotel Renuka in Kollupitiya in 1970 after the government started offering tax incentives to the hospitality sector.

Today Thambiayah's company is known as Renuka Holdings PLC and is one of Sri Lanka's largest conglomerates. Thambiayah's daughter Indumathi Renuka Rajiyah is the company's chairperson and his grandson Shamindra Vatsalan Rajiyah is the executive director.

He died prior to October 2009, aged no older than 105.
