= Old Park =

Park in Jaffna, Sri Lanka

- பழைய பூங்கா
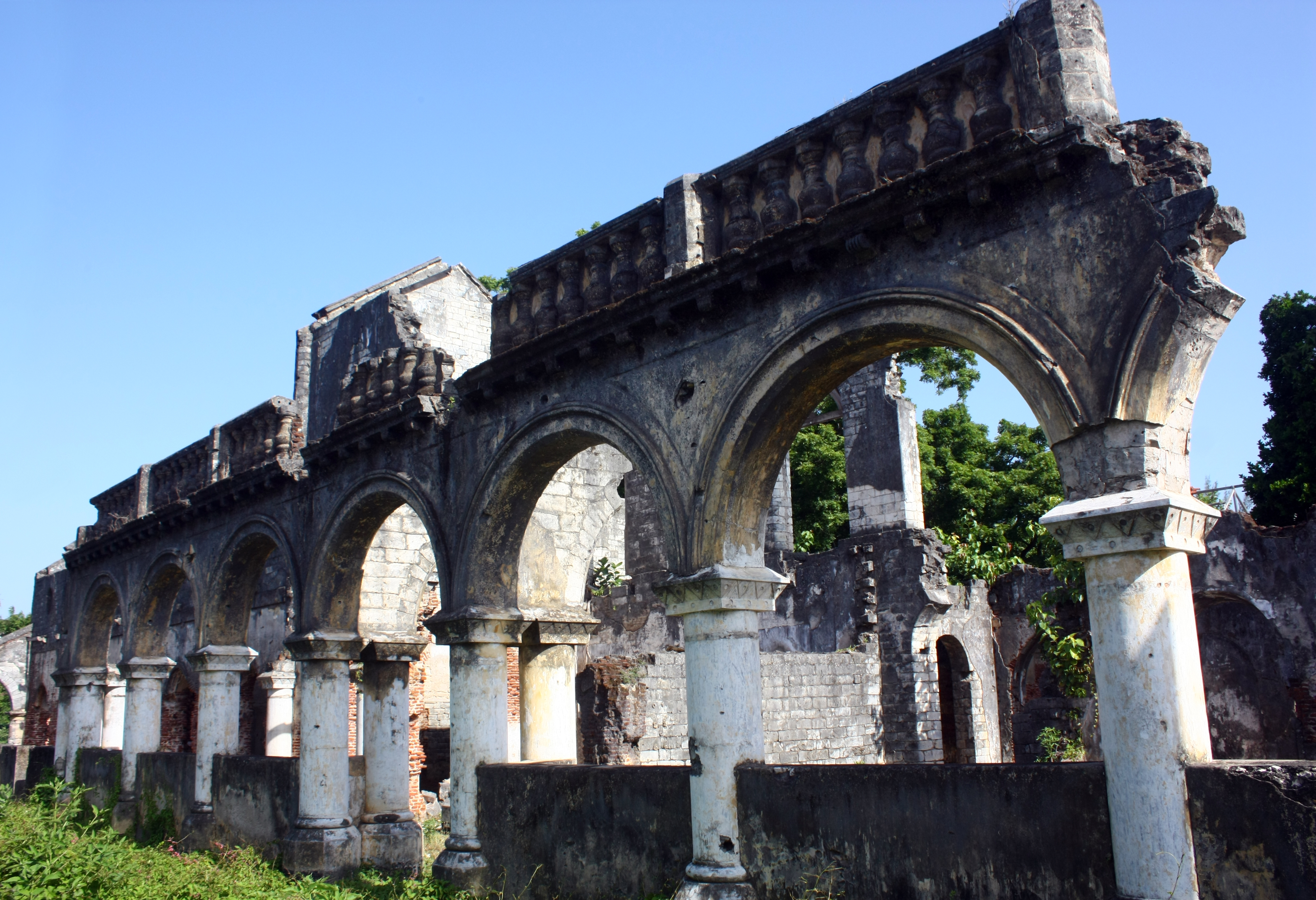
- Ruins of old Kachcheri / governor's bungalow

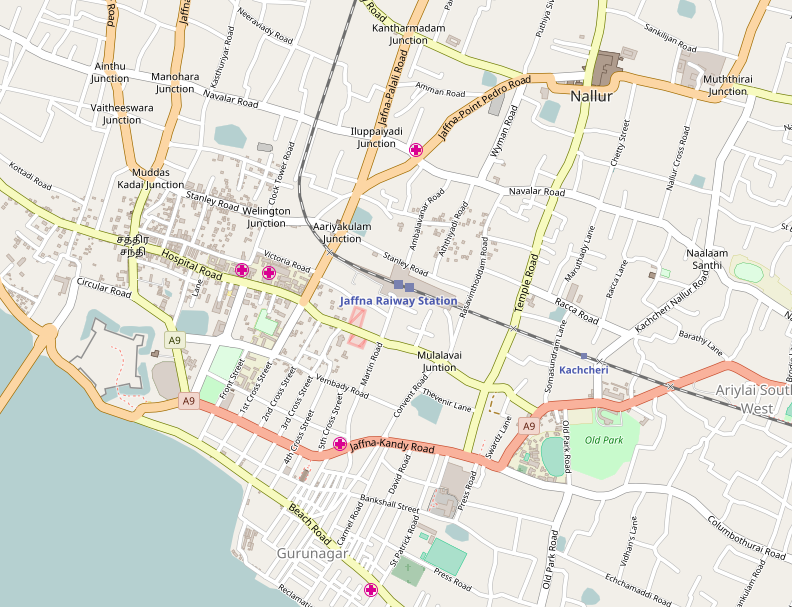
- Location within Central Jaffna
- Type: Urban park
- Location: Jaffna, Sri Lanka
- Coordinates: 9°39′31.40″N 80°01′46.10″E
- Area: 27 acres (11 ha; 0.042 sq mi)

Old Park (Tamil: பழைய பூங்கா Paḻaiya Pūṅkā) is a 27 acre urban park in the city of Jaffna in northern Sri Lanka. It was originally built in the 19th century as the gardens and grounds of the residency of the British Government Agent for the Northern Province.

== History ==
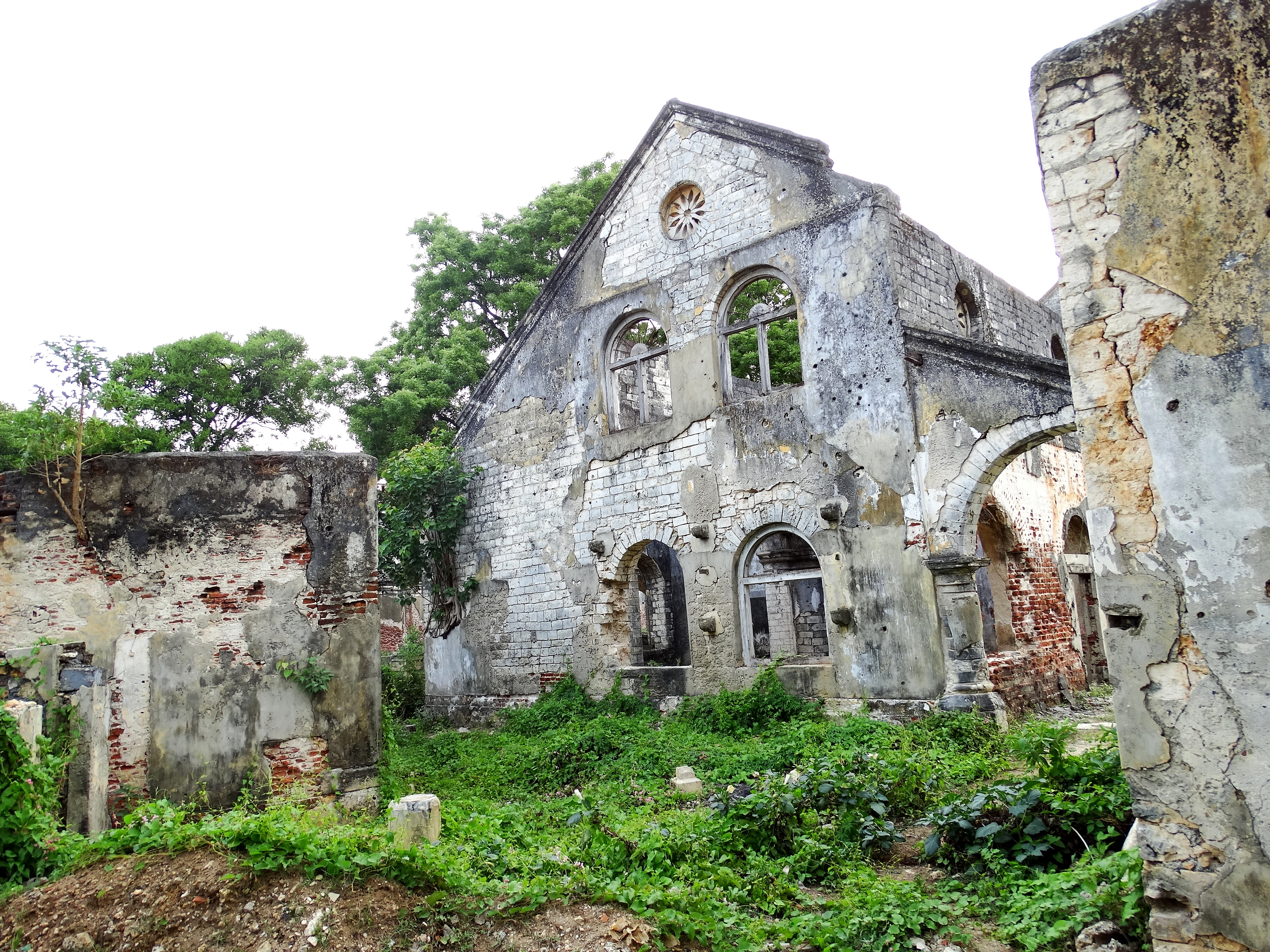
Old kachcheri building in Old Park before the renovation

British Government Agent Percival Ackland Dyke purchased a 27-acre land in Jaffna using his own funds to serve as his residency and gardens/grounds. Dyke served as Government Collector for Jaffna for four years (1829–33) and Government Agent for the Northern Province for 32 years (1833–43; 1843–60; 1861–67). Dyke was known as the "Raja of the North". He was buried at St. John's Cemetery at Chundikuli, Jaffna after his death on 9 October 1867. Dyke bequeathed Old Park, via an irrevocable deed of gift through Queen Victoria, to his successors rent free.

The residency building was in one corner of the land and the rest of the woodland consisted of trees. Old Park had some rare trees (mahogany, nedun, ironwood, baobab, lignum vitae) as well as trees common to the region (mango, tamarind). The income earned from the mango and tamarind fruits was used to maintain the park. The park also contained a variety of fauna including bats and butterflies.

As militancy increased in northern Sri Lanka in the late 1970s/early 1980s the army stationed troops at Old Park. When the rebel Liberation Tigers of Tamil Eelam controlled Jaffna in the late 1980s/early 1990s they occupied Old Park. A large army camp was once gain based at Old Park after the Sri Lankan military recaptured the city in 1995.

After the end of the civil war the provincial administration was moved from Varothayanagar, Trincomalee to Old Park in Jaffna. In July 2011 Minister of National Heritage Jagath Balasuriya declared the old Kachcheri building in Old Park to be a "Protected Monument". In September 2011 it was alleged that parts of Old Park had been destroyed on the orders of Major General G. A. Chandrasiri, the Governor of the Northern Province. Chandrasiri denied the allegations. It was also alleged that Chandrasiri was building himself a Rs. 190 million bungalow at Old Park.

The renovated Old Park was opened to the public in July 2012.
