= Kachcheri =

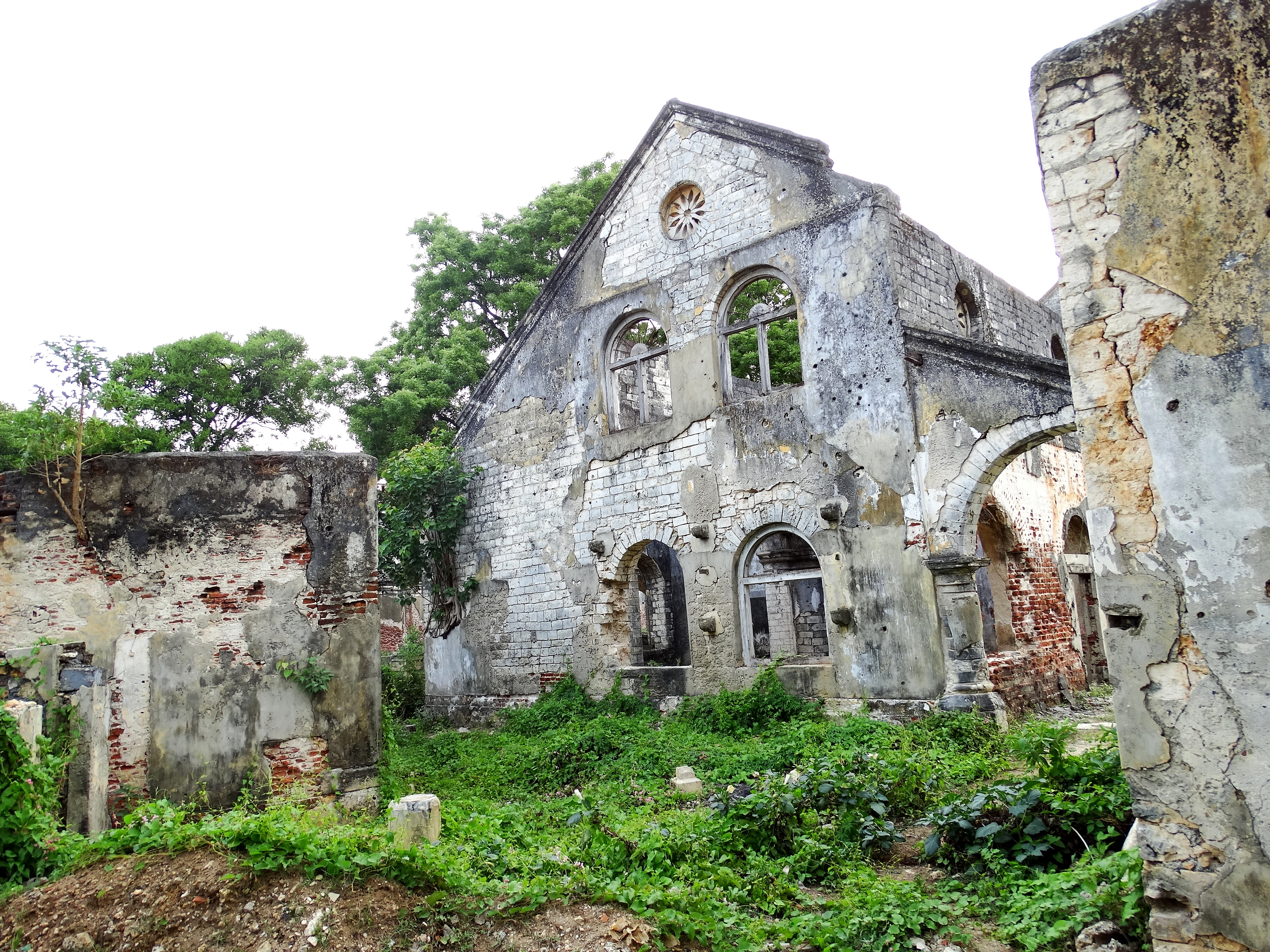
Old kachcheri building in Old Park, Jaffna before the renovation

A kachcheri or district secretariat is the principal government department that administrates a district in Sri Lanka. Each of the 25 districts has a kachcheri.

The main tasks of the District Secretariat involve coordinating communications and activities of the central government and Divisional Secretariats. The District Secretariat is also responsible for implementing and monitoring development projects at the district level and assisting lower-level subdivisions in their activities, as well as revenue collection and coordination of elections in the district. The head of a District Secretariat is the District Secretary formally known as the Government Agent.

Kachcheri is a Hindustani word initially used for the Revenue Collector's Office in the early years of the British Colonial Administration in Ceylon. (Sri Lanka) Revenue collection was a main feature of the Dutch pattern of colonial administration. In the first half of the 19th century, the British colonial administrators were able to move towards a more organised form of government with civil and revenue administration. Thus, the collector's office, which continued to be locally known as the kachcheri was converted into the Government Agent’s Office. Even after the independence, kachcheri was retained as the district administrative centre and focal point of the provincial administration and placed it under a government agent. However, in 1987, the 13th Amendment to the Constitution of the Democratic Socialist Republic of Sri Lanka made provisions for the establishment of Provincial Councils. Thus, the Provincial Council Administration which came into effect in January 1990 changed kachcheri administration which had remained unaltered since the first half of the 19th century.

== Notable Kachcheri buildings ==
- The old Kachcheri building in Old Park, Jaffna is a now a protected monument.
- The old Kachcheri building in Anuradhapura now houses an archaeological museum (Anuradhapura Archaeological Museum).
